= Dictatorship =

Autocratic form of government

A dictatorship is a form of government which is characterized by a leader who holds absolute or near-absolute political power. Politics in a dictatorship are controlled by a dictator, and they are facilitated through an inner circle of elites that includes advisers, generals, and other high-ranking officials. The dictator maintains control by influencing and appeasing the inner circle and repressing any opposition, which may include rival political parties, armed resistance, or disloyal members of the dictator's inner circle. Dictatorships can be formed by a military coup that overthrows the previous government through force or they can be formed by a self-coup in which elected leaders make their rule permanent. Dictatorships are authoritarian or totalitarian, and they can be classified as military dictatorships, one-party dictatorships, and personalist dictatorships.

The Latin word dictator originated in the early Roman Republic to refer to a constitutional office with "a temporary grant of absolute power to a leader to handle some emergency." Modern dictatorships first developed in the 19th century, which included Bonapartism in Europe and caudillos in Latin America. With the advent of the 19th and 20th centuries, dictatorships and constitutional democracies emerged as the world's two major forms of government, gradually eliminating monarchies, one of the traditional widespread forms of government of the time. Typically, a common aspect that characterizes dictatorship is suppressing freedom of thought and speech of the masses, in order to maintain complete political and social supremacy and stability. Dictatorships generally employ political propaganda to decrease the influence of proponents of alternative governing systems. The 20th century saw the rise of fascist and communist dictatorships in Europe; fascism was largely eradicated in the aftermath of World War II in 1945, while communism spread to other continents, maintaining prominence until the end of the Cold War in 1991. The 20th century also saw the rise of personalist dictatorships in Africa and military dictatorships in Latin America, both of which became prominent in the 1960s and 1970s.

The period following the collapse of the Soviet Union witnessed a sporadic rise in democracies around the world, despite several dictatorships persisting into the 21st century, particularly in Africa and Asia. During the early 21st century, democratic governments outnumbered authoritarian states by 98 to 80. The second decade was marked by a democratic recession, following the 2008 financial crisis which drastically reduced the appeal of the Western model around the world, compounded by the rise of China. By 2019, the number of authoritarian governments had again surmounted that of democracies by 92 to 87.

Dictatorships often attempt to portray a democratic facade, frequently holding elections to establish their legitimacy or provide incentives to members of the ruling party, but these elections are not competitive for the opposition. Stability in a dictatorship is maintained through coercion and political repression, which involves the restriction of access to information, the tracking of the political opposition, and acts of violence. Dictatorships that fail to repress the opposition are susceptible to collapse through a coup or a revolution. Dictatorships that came to power during revolutions tend to be exceptionally durable and long-lasting.

== Structure ==
The power structures of dictatorships vary, and different definitions of dictatorship consider different elements of this structure. Political scientists such as Juan José Linz and Samuel P. Huntington identify key attributes that define the power structure of a dictatorship, including a single leader or a small group of leaders, the exercise of power with few limitations, limited political pluralism, and limited mass mobilization.

The dictator exercises most or total power over the government and society, but sometimes elites are necessary to carry out the dictator's rule. They form an inner circle, making up a class of elites that hold a degree of power within the dictatorship and receive benefits in exchange for their support. They may be military officers, party members, friends, or family of the dictator. Elites are also the primary political threats to a dictator, as they can leverage their power to influence or overthrow the dictatorship. The inner circle's support is necessary for a dictator's orders to be carried out, causing elites to serve as a check on the dictator's power. To enact policy, a dictator must either appease the regime's elites or attempt to replace them. Elites must also compete to wield more power than one another, but the amount of power held by elites also depends on their unity. Factions or divisions among the elites will mitigate their ability to bargain with the dictator, resulting in the dictator having more unrestrained power. A unified inner circle can overthrow a dictator, and the dictator must make greater concessions to the inner circle to stay in power. This is particularly true when the inner circle is made up of military officers who have the resources to carry out a military coup.

The opposition to a dictatorship represents all of the factions that are not part of the dictatorship and anyone who does not support the regime. Organized opposition is a threat to the stability of a dictatorship, as it seeks to undermine public support for the dictator and calls for regime change. A dictator may address the opposition by repressing it through force, modifying laws to restrict its power, or appeasing it with limited benefits. The opposition can be an external group, or it can also include current and former members of the dictator's inner circle.

Totalitarianism is a variation of dictatorship characterized by the presence of a single political party and, more specifically, by a powerful leader who imposes personal and political prominence. Power is enforced through a steadfast collaboration between the government and a highly developed ideology. A totalitarian government has "total control of mass communications and social and economic organizations". Political philosopher Hannah Arendt describes totalitarianism as a new and extreme form of dictatorship composed of "atomized, isolated individuals" in which ideology plays a leading role in defining how the entire society should be organized. Political scientist Juan José Linz identifies a spectrum of political systems with democracies and totalitarian regimes separated by authoritarian regimes with varied classifications of hybrid systems. He describes totalitarian regimes as exercising control over politics and political mobilization rather than merely suppressing it.

== Formation ==
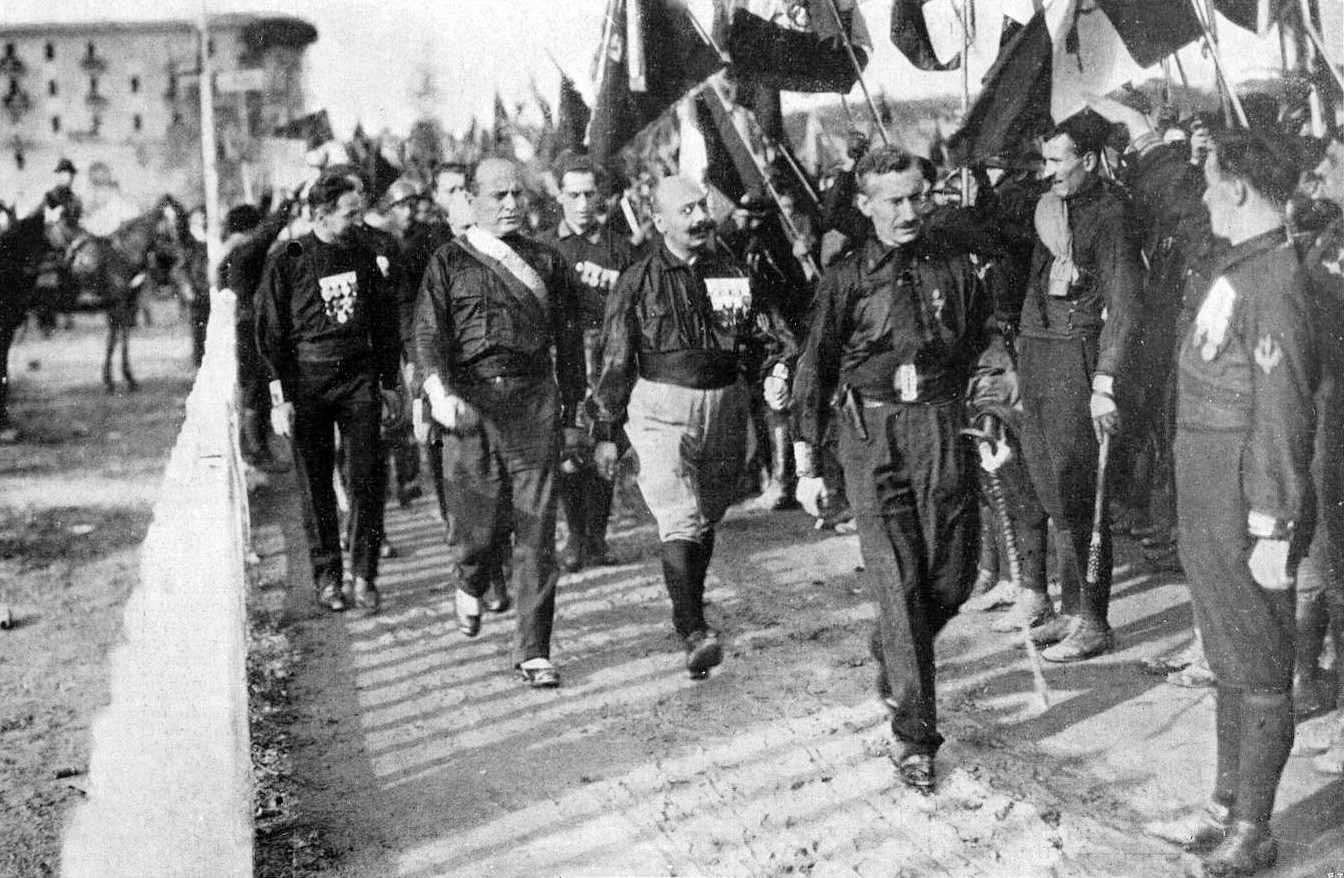
Benito Mussolini in the March on Rome that installed him as dictator in Italy

A dictatorship is formed when a specific group seizes power, with the composition of this group affecting how power is seized and how the eventual dictatorship will rule. The group may be military or political, it may be organized or disorganized, and it may disproportionately represent a certain demographic. After power is seized, the group must determine what positions its members will hold in the new government and how this government will operate, sometimes resulting in disagreements that split the group. Members of the group will typically make up the elites in a dictator's inner circle at the beginning of a new dictatorship, though the dictator may remove them as a means to gain additional power.

Unless they have undertaken a self-coup, those seizing power typically have little governmental experience and do not have a detailed policy plan in advance. If the dictator has not seized power through a political party, then a party may be formed as a mechanism to reward supporters and to concentrate power in the hands of political allies instead of militant allies. Parties formed after the seizure of power often have little influence and only exist to serve the dictator.

Most dictatorships are formed through military means or a political party. Nearly half of dictatorships start as a military coup, though others have been started by foreign intervention, elected officials ending competitive elections, insurgent takeovers, popular uprisings by citizens, or legal maneuvering by autocratic elites to take power within their government. Between 1946 and 2010, 42% of dictatorships began by overthrowing different types of dictatorship, and 26% began after achieving independence from a foreign government. Many others developed following a period of warlordism.

== Types of dictatorships ==
A classification of dictatorships, which began with political scientist Barbara Geddes in 1999, focuses on where power lies. Under this system, there are three types of dictatorships. Military dictatorships are controlled by military officers, one-party dictatorships are controlled by the leadership of a political party, and personalist dictatorships are controlled by a single individual. Hybrid dictatorships are regimes that have a combination of these classifications.

=== Military ===
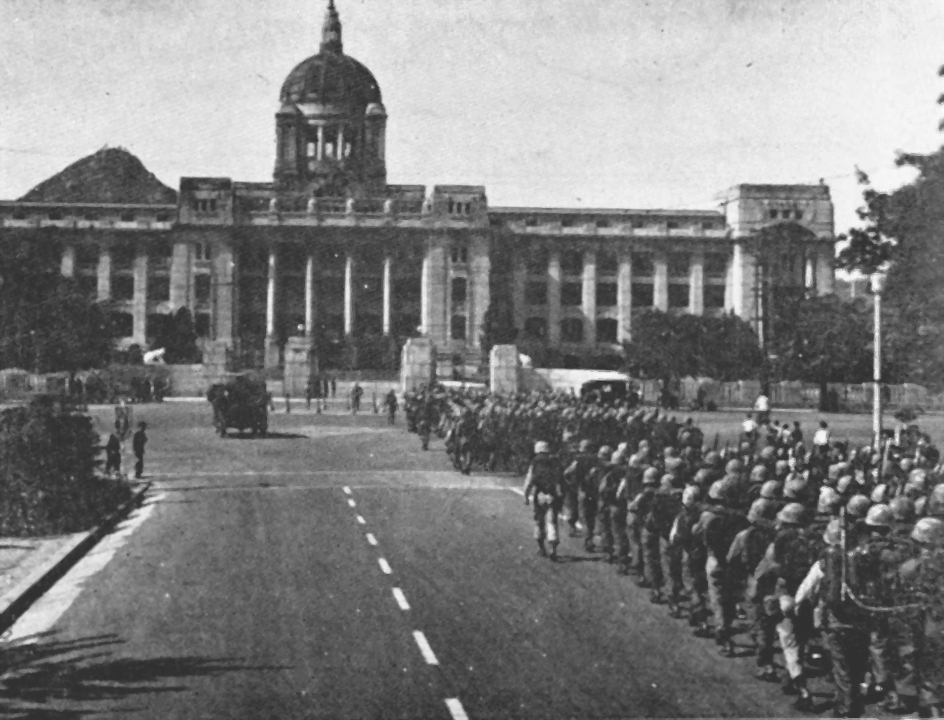
Soldiers occupy Seoul, South Korea, as part of the May 16 coup that placed General Park Chung Hee in power.

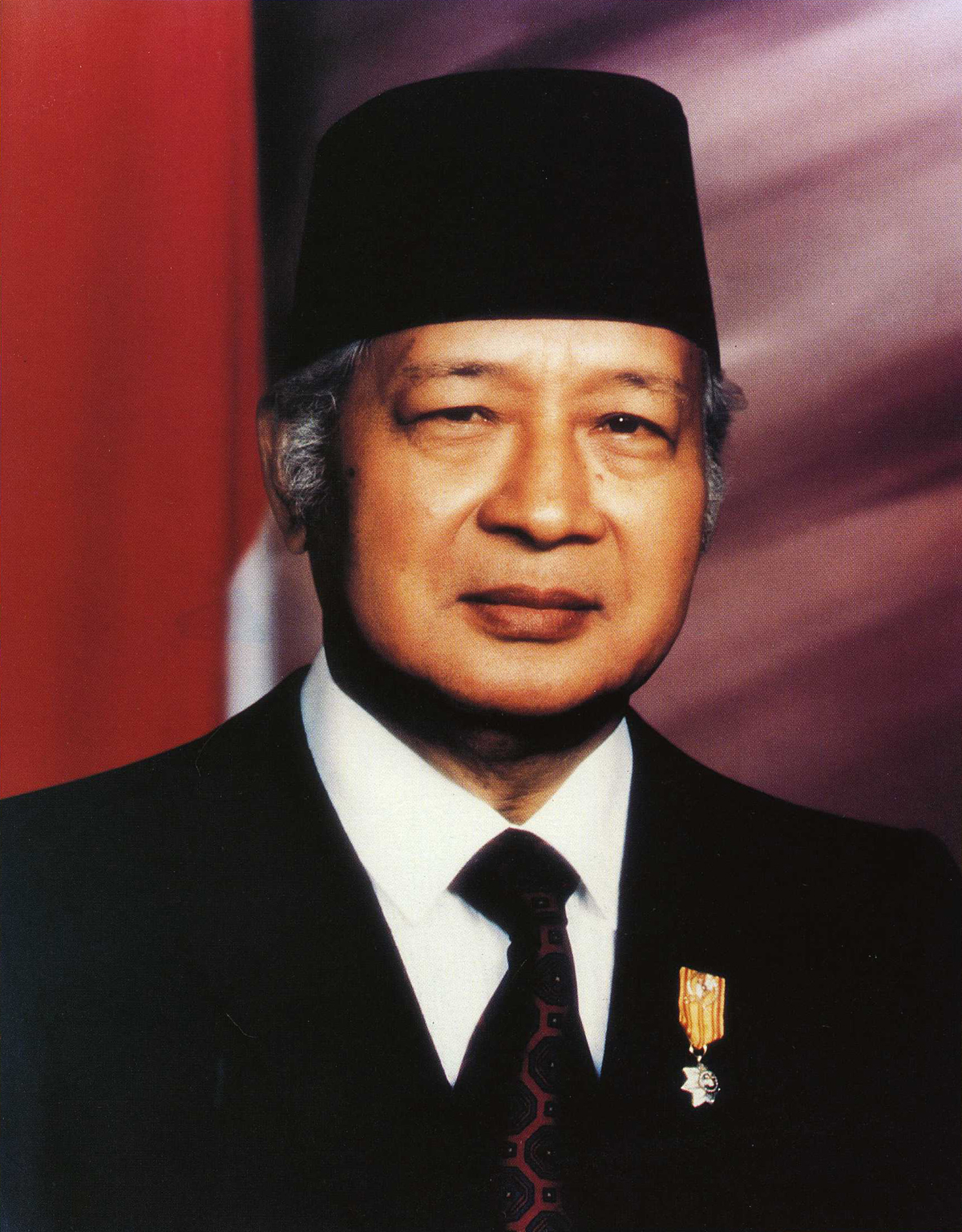
Suharto, President of Indonesia from 1967 to 1998, ruled through a military-backed dictatorship marked by widespread human rights abuses and corruption.

Military dictatorships are regimes in which military officers hold power, determine who will lead the country, and exercise influence over policy. They are most common in developing nations in Africa, Asia, and Latin America. They are often unstable, and the average duration of a military dictatorship is only five years, but they are often followed by additional military coups and military dictatorships. While common in the 20th century, the prominence of military dictatorships declined in the 1970s and 1980s.

Military dictatorships are typically formed by a military coup in which senior officers use the military to overthrow the government. In democracies, the threat of a military coup is associated with the period immediately after a democracy's creation but before large-scale military reforms. In oligarchies, the threat of a military coup comes from the strength of the military weighed against the concessions made to the military. Other factors associated with military coups include extensive natural resources, limited use of the military internationally, and use of the military as an oppressive force domestically. Military coups do not necessarily result in military dictatorships, as power may then be passed to an individual or the military may allow democratic elections to take place.

Military dictatorships often have traits in common due to the shared background of military dictators. These dictators may view themselves as impartial in their oversight of a country due to their nonpartisan status, and they may view themselves as "guardians of the state". The predominance of violent force in military training manifests in an acceptance of violence as a political tool and the ability to organize violence on a large scale. Military dictators may also be less trusting or diplomatic and underestimate the use of bargaining and compromise in politics.

=== One-party ===
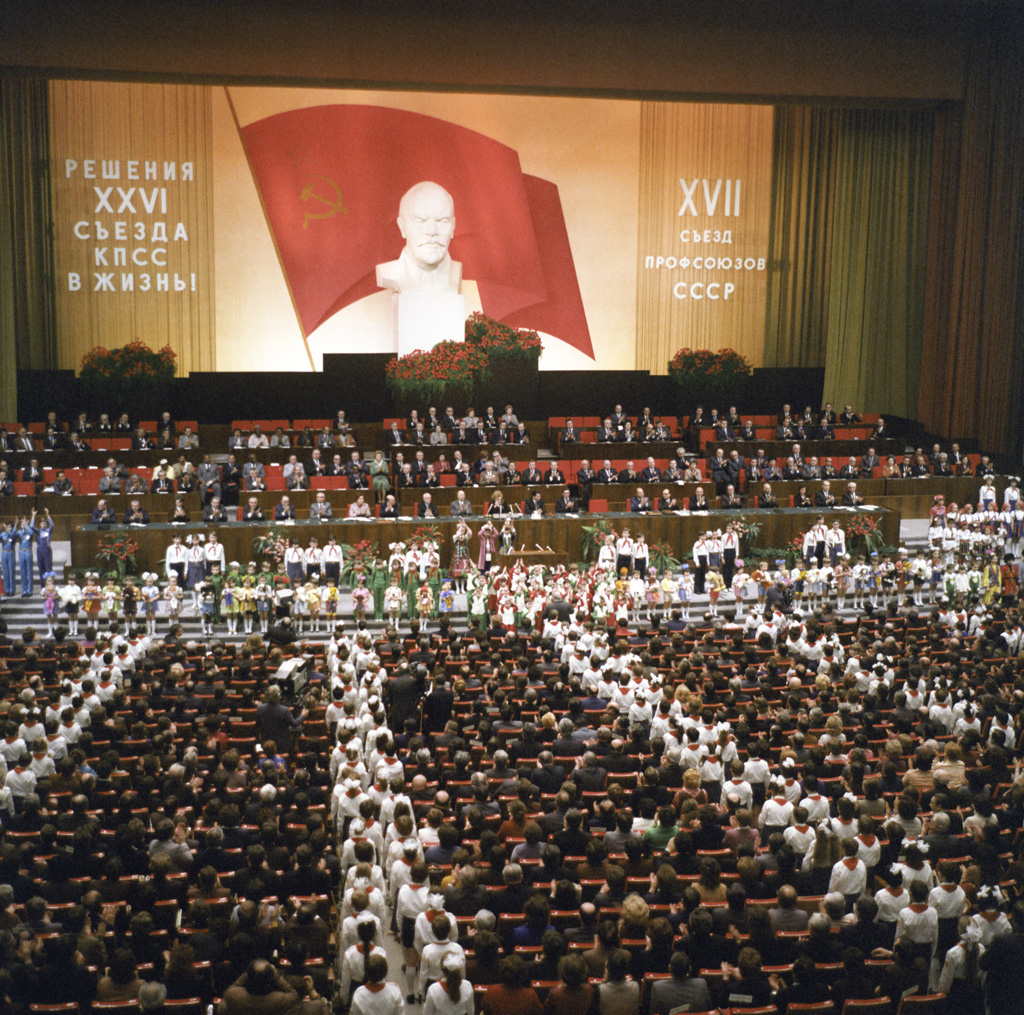
An assembly at the Kremlin Palace of Congresses in Moscow, Soviet Union

One-party dictatorships are governments in which a single political party dominates politics. Single-party dictatorships are one-party states in which only the party in power is legalized, sometimes along with minor allied parties, and all opposition parties are banned. Dominant-party dictatorships or electoral authoritarian dictatorships are one-party dictatorships in which opposition parties are nominally legal but cannot meaningfully influence government. Single-party dictatorships were most common during the Cold War, with dominant-party dictatorships becoming more common after the fall of the Soviet Union. Ruling parties in one-party dictatorships are distinct from political parties that were created to serve a dictator in that the ruling party in a one-party dictatorship permeates every level of society.

One-party dictatorships are more stable than other forms of authoritarian rule: due to the structure of their leadership, they are significantly less likely to face civil conflict, insurgency, or terrorism than other forms of dictatorship, and tend to see higher economic growth. The use of ruling parties allows a dictatorship to more broadly influence the populace and facilitate political agreement between party elites, provides more legitimacy to its leadership and elites than other forms of dictatorship, and facilitates a peaceful transfer of power at the end of a dictator's rule. Between 1950 and 2016, one-party dictatorships made up 57% of authoritarian regimes in the world, and one-party dictatorships have continued to expand more quickly than other forms of dictatorship in the latter half of the 20th century.

One-party dictatorships became prominent in Asia and Eastern Europe during the Cold War as communist governments were installed in several countries. One-party rule also developed in several countries in Africa during decolonization in the 1960s and 1970s, some of which produced authoritarian regimes. A ruling party in a one-party dictatorship may rule under any ideology or it may have no guiding ideology. Marxist one-party states are sometimes distinguished from other one-party states, but they function similarly. When a one-party dictatorship develops gradually through legal means, it can result in conflict between the party organization and the state apparatus and civil service, as the party rules in parallel and increasingly appoints its members to positions of power. Parties that take power through violence are often able to implement larger changes in a shorter period.

=== Personalist ===
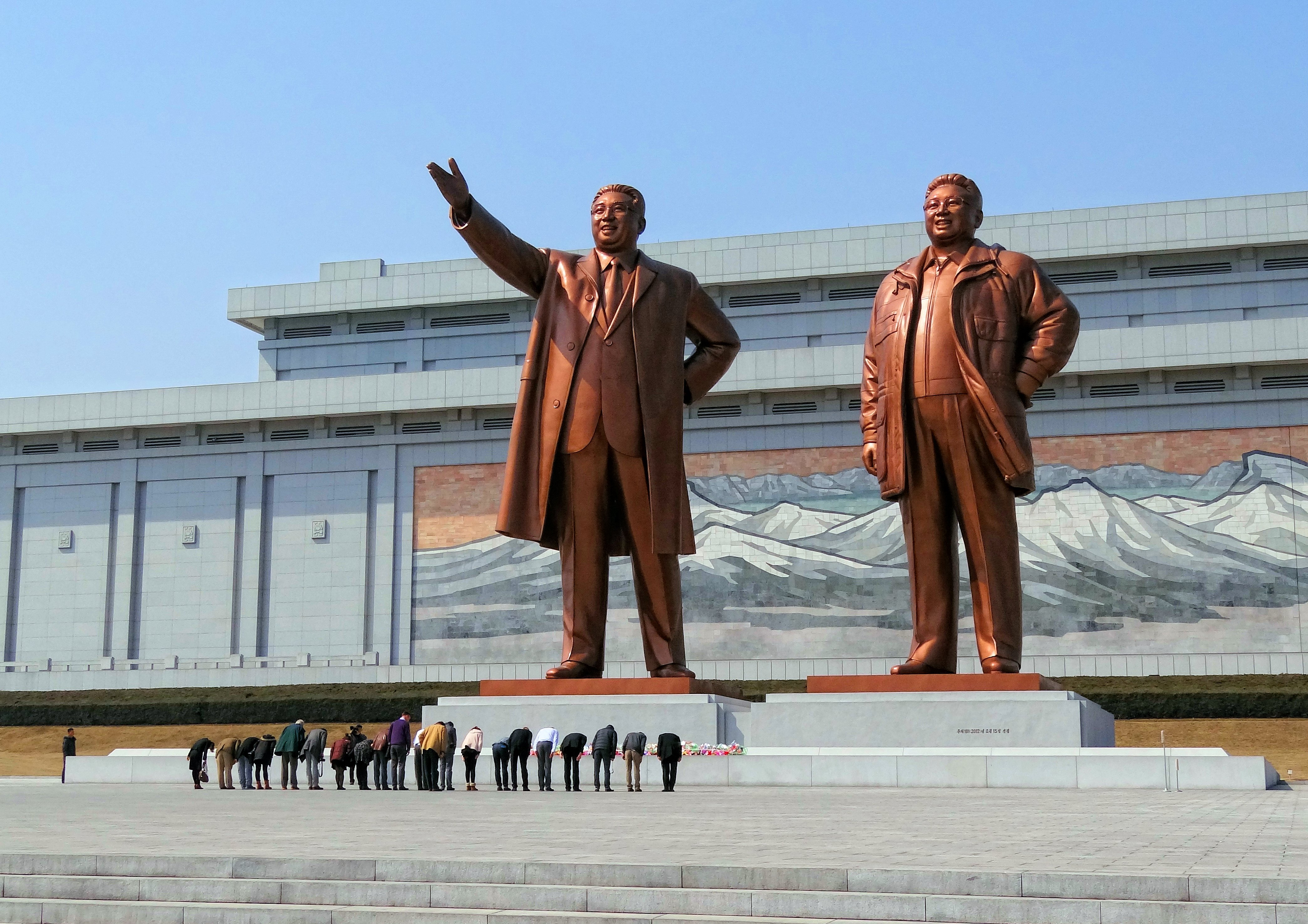
Citizens of North Korea bow to statues of former dictators Kim Il Sung and Kim Jong Il in 2014

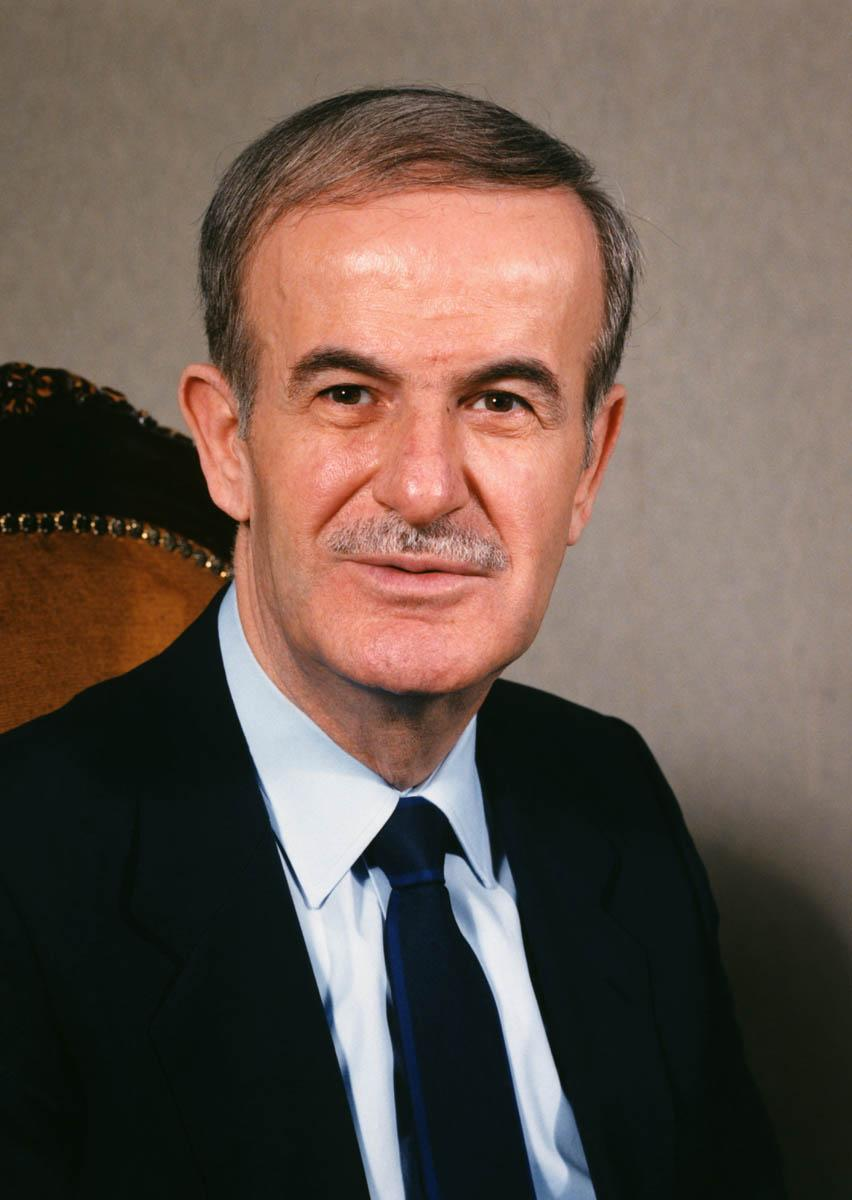
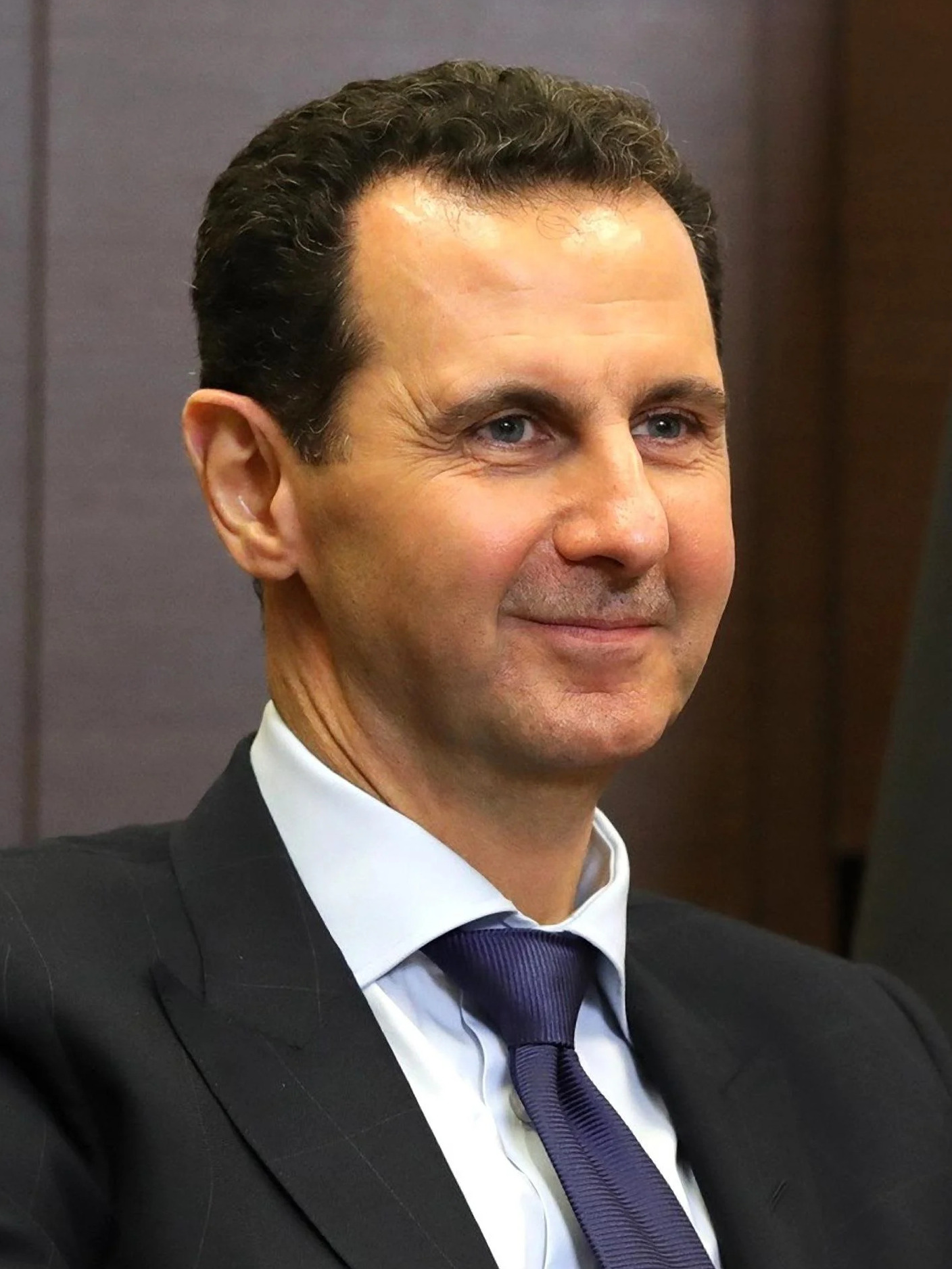
Syria was ruled by the highly personalist generational dictatorship of Hafez al-Assad (r. 1971–2000) and his son Bashar al-Assad (r. 2000 – 2024) between the Cold War in the 1970s until 2024.

Personalist dictatorships are regimes in which all of the power lies in the hands of a single individual. They differ from other forms of dictatorships in that the dictator has greater access to key political positions and the government's treasury, and they are more commonly subject to the discretion of the dictator. Personalist dictators may be members of the military or leaders of a political party, but neither the military nor the party exercises power independently from the dictator. In personalist dictatorships, the elite corps are usually made up of close friends or family members of the dictator, who typically handpicks these individuals to serve their posts. These dictatorships often emerge either from loosely organized seizures of power, giving the leader opportunity to consolidate power, or from democratically elected leaders in countries with weak institutions, giving the leader opportunity to change the constitution. Personalist dictatorships are more common in Sub-Saharan Africa due to less established institutions in the region. There has been an increase in personalist dictatorships since the end of the Cold War.

Personalist dictators typically favor loyalty over competence in their governments and have a general distrust of intelligentsia. Elites in personalist dictatorships often do not have a professional political career and are unqualified for the positions they are given. A personalist dictator will manage these appointees by segmenting the government so that they cannot collaborate. The result is that such regimes have no internal checks and balances, and are thus unrestrained when exerting repression on their people, making radical shifts in foreign policy, or starting wars with other countries. Due to the lack of accountability and the smaller group of elites, personalist dictatorships are more prone to corruption than other forms of dictatorship, and they are more repressive than other forms of dictatorship. Personalist dictatorships often collapse with the death of the dictator. They are more likely to end in violence and less likely to democratize than other forms of dictatorship.

The rotating statue of Saparmyrat Nyýazow in Turkmenistan

Personalist dictatorships fit the exact classic stereotype of authoritarian rule. Within a personalist regime, an issue called "the dictator's dilemma" arises. This idea references the heavy reliance on repression of the public to stay in power, which creates incentives for all constituents to falsify their preferences, which does not allow for dictators to know the genuine popular beliefs or their realistic measure of societal support. As a result of authoritarian politics, a series of major issues may ensue. Preference falsification, internal politics, data scarcity, and restriction on the freedom of the press are just a few examples of the dangers of a personalistic authoritarian regime. Although, when it comes to polling and elections a dictator could use their power to override private preferences. Many personalist regimes will install open ballots to protect their regimes and implement heavy security measures and censorship for those whose personal preferences do not align with the values of the leader.

The shift in the power relation between the dictator and their inner circle has severe consequences for the behavior of such regimes as a whole. Personalist regimes diverge from other regimes when it comes to their longevity, methods of breakdown, levels of corruption, and proneness to conflicts. On average, they last twice as long as military dictatorships, but not as long as one-party dictatorships. Personalist dictatorships also experience growth differently, as they often lack the institutions or qualified leadership to sustain an economy.

This type of dictatorship has become increasingly prevalent, rising from 28% of authoritarian regimes in 1988 to 52% by 2010, making it the most common form of authoritarianism. Power in these regimes is concentrated in the executive branch, supported by subjugated government branches, with a marked absence of effective checks-and-balances. The main contrast between absolutism and personalist rule lies in the source and nature of constraints. Absolute monarchy operates within a framework of established (though often unwritten) rules and institutions that legitimize their authority and provide for stable succession. The "absolutist bias" of earlier scholars sometimes led to its application to personalist rule and totalitarianism. However, in personalist rule, institutions are weakened and de-institutionalized, contrasting with the more structured, albeit legally unrestrained, nature of absolutism. Personalist rule is strongly influenced by and overlaps with neo-sultanism, reflecting the process of "sultanization," where a ruler gains undisputed dominance, erodes restraints, and expands systemic corruption through patronal networks. This process renders the public sphere increasingly personal and hollows out state institutions.

Scholars like Daniel Chirot suggest that the classical model of tyranny is particularly relevant for understanding 20th-century African personalist dictatorships. Therefore, personalist rule captures many features of tyranny in a post-monarchical context, referring to rulers who are "unconstrained by legal checks and balances of power".

== History ==
=== Early dictatorships ===
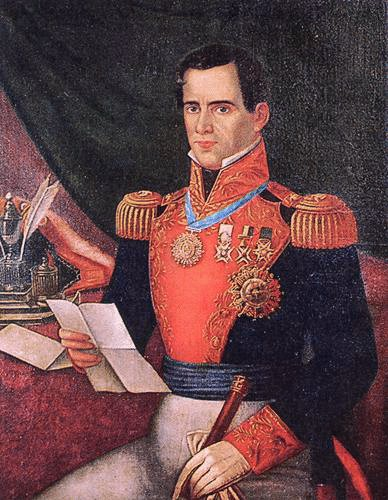
Military dictator Antonio López de Santa Anna wearing a Mexican military uniform

The concept of "dictator" was first developed during the Roman Republic. A Roman dictator was a special magistrate that was temporarily appointed by the consul during times of crisis and granted total executive authority. The role of the dictator was created for instances when a single leader was needed to command and restore stability. At least 85 such dictators were chosen for the Roman Republic, the last of which was chosen to wage the Second Punic War. The dictatorship was revived 120 years later by Sulla after his crushing of a populist movement, and 33 years after that by Julius Caesar. Caesar subverted the tradition of temporary dictatorships when he was made dictator perpetuo, or a dictator for life, which led to the creation of the Roman Empire. The rule of a dictator was not necessarily considered tyrannical in Ancient Rome, though it has been described in some accounts as a "temporary tyranny" or an "elective tyranny".

There have been many regimes which have since been compared to or described as dictatorships. In Europe, the Commonwealth of England under Oliver Cromwell, formed in 1649 after the Second English Civil War, has been described as a military dictatorship by its contemporary opponents and by some modern academics. Maximilien Robespierre has been similarly described as a dictator while he controlled the National Convention in France and carried out the Reign of Terror in 1793 and 1794.

Dictatorship developed as a major form of government in the 19th century, though the concept was not universally seen pejoratively at the time, with both a tyrannical concept and a quasi-constitutional concept of dictatorship understood to exist. In Europe it was often thought of in terms of Bonapartism and Caesarism, with the former describing the military rule of Napoleon and the latter describing the imperial rule of Napoleon III in the vein of Julius Caesar. The Spanish American wars of independence took place in the early-19th century, creating many new Latin American governments. Many of these governments fell under the control of caudillos, or personalist dictators. Most caudillos came from a military background, and their rule was typically associated with pageantry and glamor. Caudillos were often nominally constrained by a constitution, but the caudillo had the power to draft a new constitution as he wished. Many are noted for their cruelty, while others are honored as national heroes. When creating a provisional executive in Sicily during the Expedition of the Thousand in 1860, Giuseppe Garibaldi officially assumed the title of "dictator", and this period was known as the "Dictatorship of Garibaldi". During the 1863 January uprising in Poland, "Dictator" was also the official title of four leaders, the first being Ludwik Mierosławski.

=== Interwar dictatorships and World War II ===
==== Europe ====
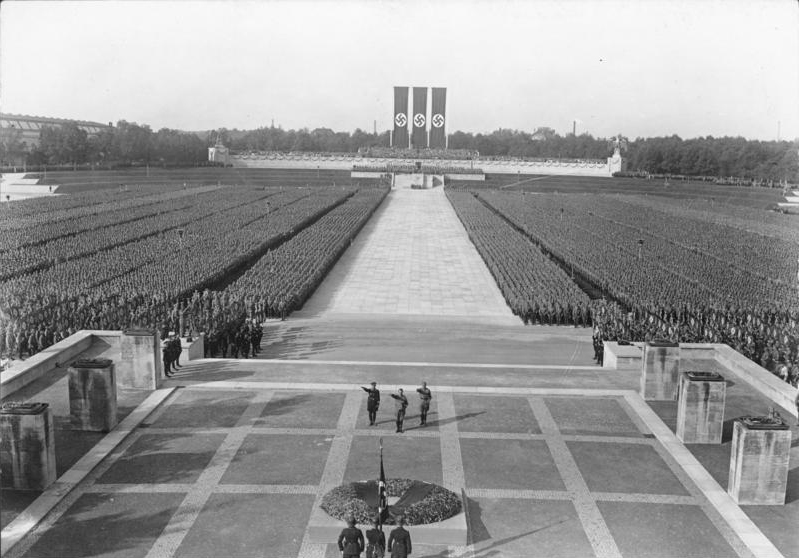
The Nuremberg rallies celebrated fascism and the rule of Adolf Hitler in Nazi Germany.

In the time between World War I and World War II, several dictatorships were established in Europe through coups which were carried out by far-left and far-right movements. The aftermath of World War I resulted in a major shift in European politics, establishing new governments, facilitating internal change in older governments, and redrawing the boundaries between countries, allowing opportunities for these movements to seize power. The societal upheaval caused by World War I and the unstable peace it produced further contributed to the instability that benefited extremist movements and rallied support for their causes. Far-left and far-right dictatorships used similar methods to maintain power, including cult of personality, concentration camps, forced labor, mass murder, and genocide.

The first communist state was created by Vladimir Lenin and the Bolsheviks with the establishment of Soviet Russia during the Russian Revolution in 1917. The government was described as a dictatorship of the proletariat in which power was exercised by soviets. The Bolsheviks consolidated power by 1922, forming the Soviet Union. Lenin was followed by Joseph Stalin in 1924, who consolidated total power and implemented totalitarian rule by 1929. The Russian Revolution inspired a wave of left-wing revolutionary movements in Europe between 1917 and 1923, but none saw the same level of success.

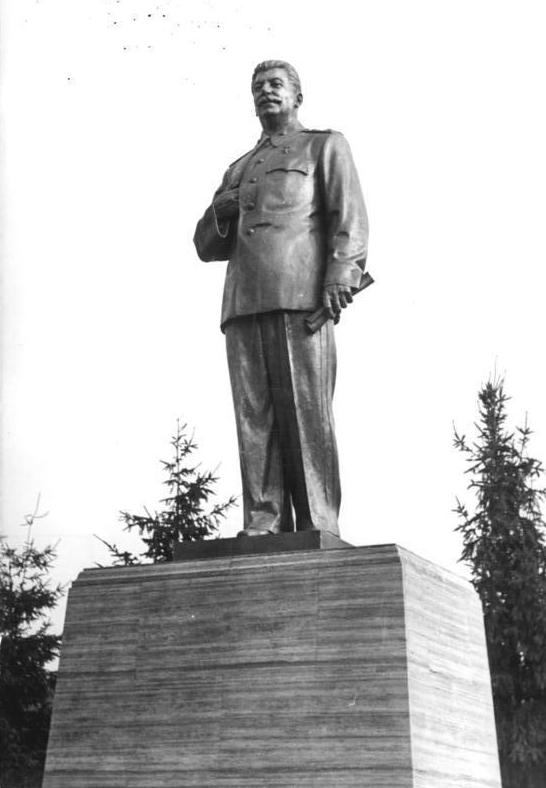
Statue of Stalin in East Berlin, 1951. It was removed in 1961 as part of de-Stalinization.

At the same time, nationalist movements grew throughout Europe. These movements were a response to what they perceived as decadence and societal decay due to the changing social norms and race relations brought about by liberalism. Fascism developed in Europe as a rejection of liberalism, socialism, and modernism, and the first fascist political parties formed in the 1920s. Italian dictator Benito Mussolini seized power in 1922, and began implementing reforms in 1925 to create the first fascist dictatorship. These reforms incorporated totalitarianism, fealty to the state, expansionism, corporatism, and anti-communism. Several right-wing dictatorships also emerged in the Balkans and the Baltic states during the interwar period.

Adolf Hitler and the Nazi Party created a second fascist dictatorship in Germany in 1933, obtaining absolute power through a combination of electoral victory, violence, and emergency powers. Other nationalist movements in Europe established dictatorships based on the fascist model. During World War II, Italy and Germany occupied several countries in Europe, imposing fascist puppet states upon many of the countries that they invaded. After being defeated in World War II, the far-right dictatorships of Europe collapsed, with the exceptions of Spain and Portugal. The Soviet Union occupied nationalist dictatorships in the east and replaced them with communist dictatorships, while others established liberal democratic governments in the Western Bloc.

==== Latin America ====
Dictatorships in Latin America were developed late into the 19th century and persisted into the 20th century like the Porfiriato of Mexico, and further military coups established new regimes, often in the name of nationalism. After a brief period of democratization, Latin America underwent a rapid transition toward dictatorship in the 1930s. Populist movements were strengthened following the economic turmoil of the Great Depression, producing populist dictatorships in several Latin American countries. European fascism was imported to Latin America as well, and the Vargas Era of Brazil was heavily influenced by the corporatism practiced in fascist Italy.

=== Cold War dictatorships ===
==== Africa ====
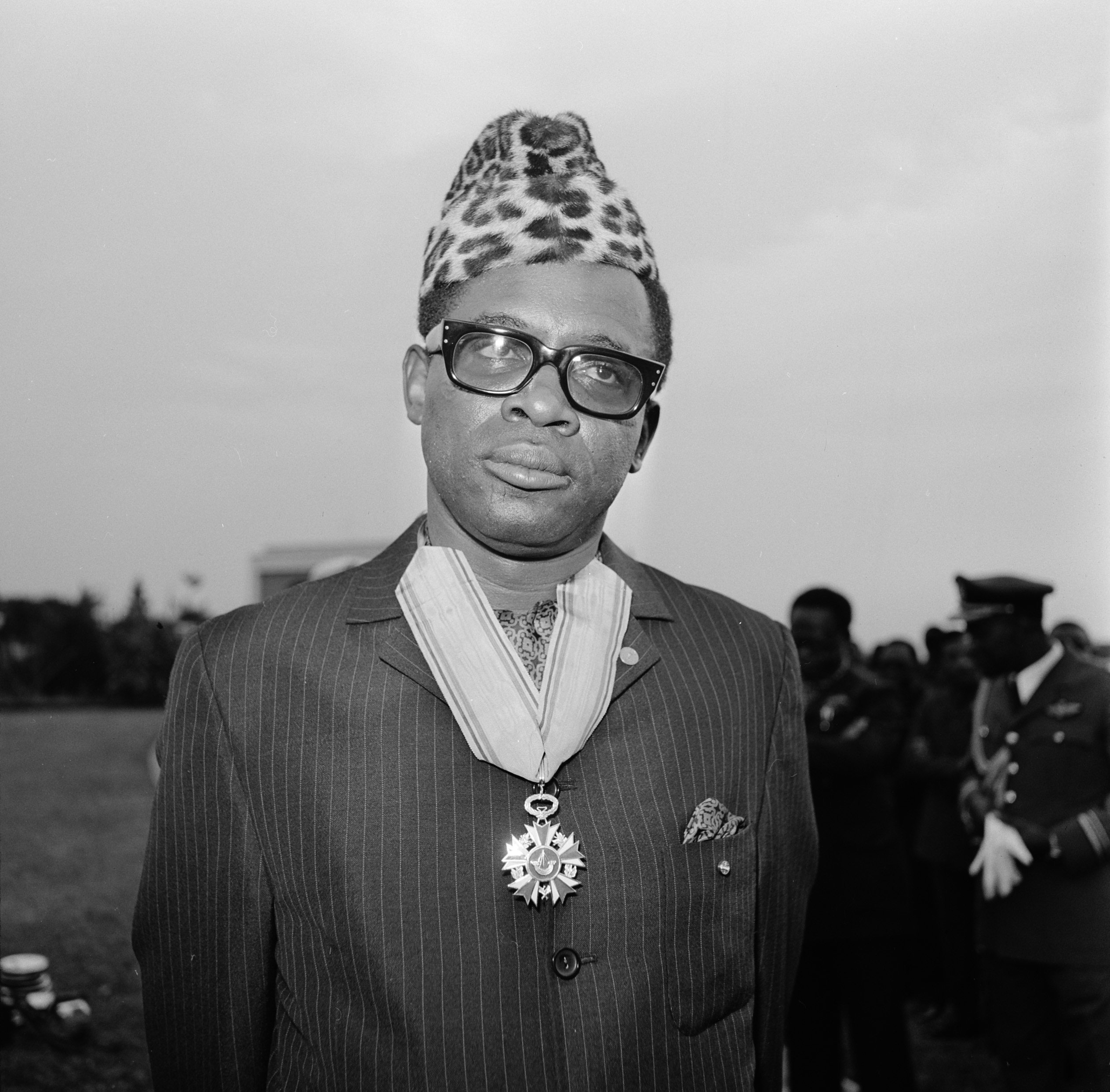
Mobutu Sese Seko, Zaire's longtime dictator

Many dictatorships formed in Africa, with most forming after countries gained independence during decolonisation. Mobutu Sese Seko ruled the Democratic Republic of the Congo as a dictator for decades, renaming it Zaire. Teodoro Obiang Nguema Mbasogo has ruled Equatorial Guinea as a dictator since he led a military coup in 1979. In 1973, King Sobhuza II of Swaziland suspended the constitution and ruled as an absolute monarch. Samuel Doe established a military dictatorship in Liberia in the 1980s. Libya was ruled by Muammar Gaddafi for several decades following a military coup. Moussa Traoré ruled as a dictator in Mali. Habib Bourguiba ruled as a dictator in Tunisia until he was deposed by a coup led by Zine El Abidine Ben Ali in 1987, who in turn ruled as a dictator until the Tunisian Revolution in 2011. Robert Mugabe ruled as a dictator in Zimbabwe.

Early socialist dictatorships in Africa mainly developed as personalist dictatorships, in which a single socialist would take power instead of a ruling party. Later in the Cold War, the Soviet Union increased its influence in Africa as Marxist–Leninist dictatorships developed in several African countries. One-party Marxist states in Africa included Angola under the MPLA, Benin under Mathieu Kérékou, Cape Verde under the PAICV, the Congo under the Congolese Party of Labour, Ethiopia under the Workers' Party of Ethiopia, Madagascar under AREMA, Mozambique under FRELIMO, and Somalia under Siad Barre.

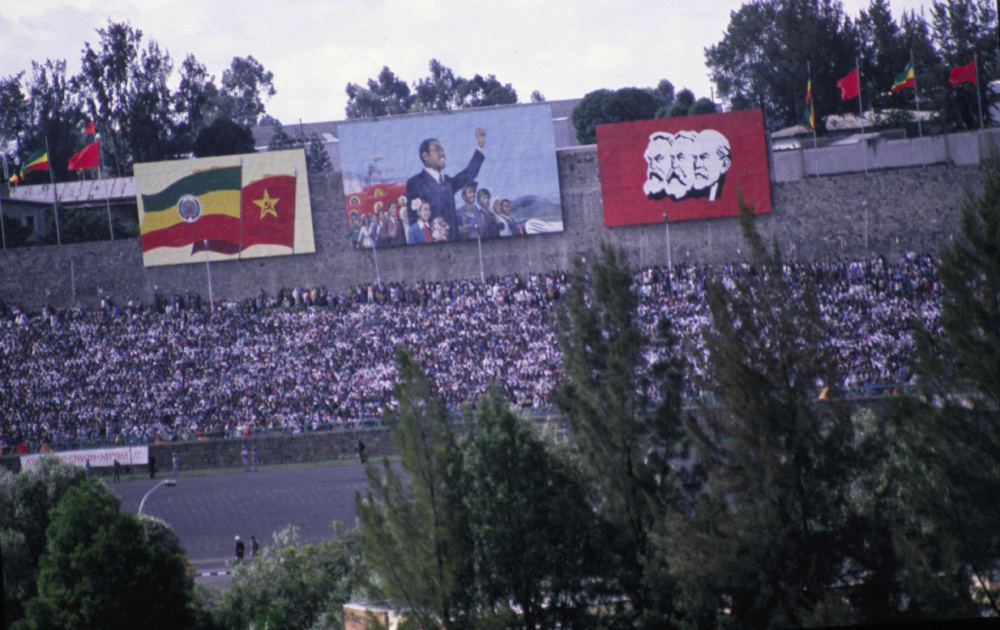
A communist rally in Addis Ababa, Ethiopia, during the country's period of Marxist dictatorship, the People's Democratic Republic of Ethiopia

Many African countries underwent several military coups that installed a series of military dictatorships throughout the Cold War. These include Benin, Burkina Faso, Burundi, the Central African Republic, Comoros, the Democratic Republic of the Congo, Ethiopia, Ghana, Mauritania, Niger, Nigeria, Sierra Leone, Sudan, and Uganda, each undergoing at least three successful military coups between 1959 and 2001.

Some leaders of African countries abolished opposition parties, establishing one-party dictatorships. These include the National Liberation Front in Algeria, the Chadian Progressive Party under François Tombalbaye in Chad, the Gabonese Democratic Party under Omar Bongo in Gabon, the Democratic Party under Ahmed Sékou Touré in Guinea, the Malawi Congress Party under Hastings Banda in Malawi, the MNSD under Ali Saibou in Niger, MRND under Juvénal Habyarimana in Rwanda, the Socialist Party under Léopold Sédar Senghor in Senegal, Julius Nyerere in Tanzania, the RPT under Gnassingbé Eyadéma in Togo, and the United National Independence Party under Kenneth Kaunda in Zambia. The KANU in Kenya ruled under a de facto one-party state.

==== Asia ====
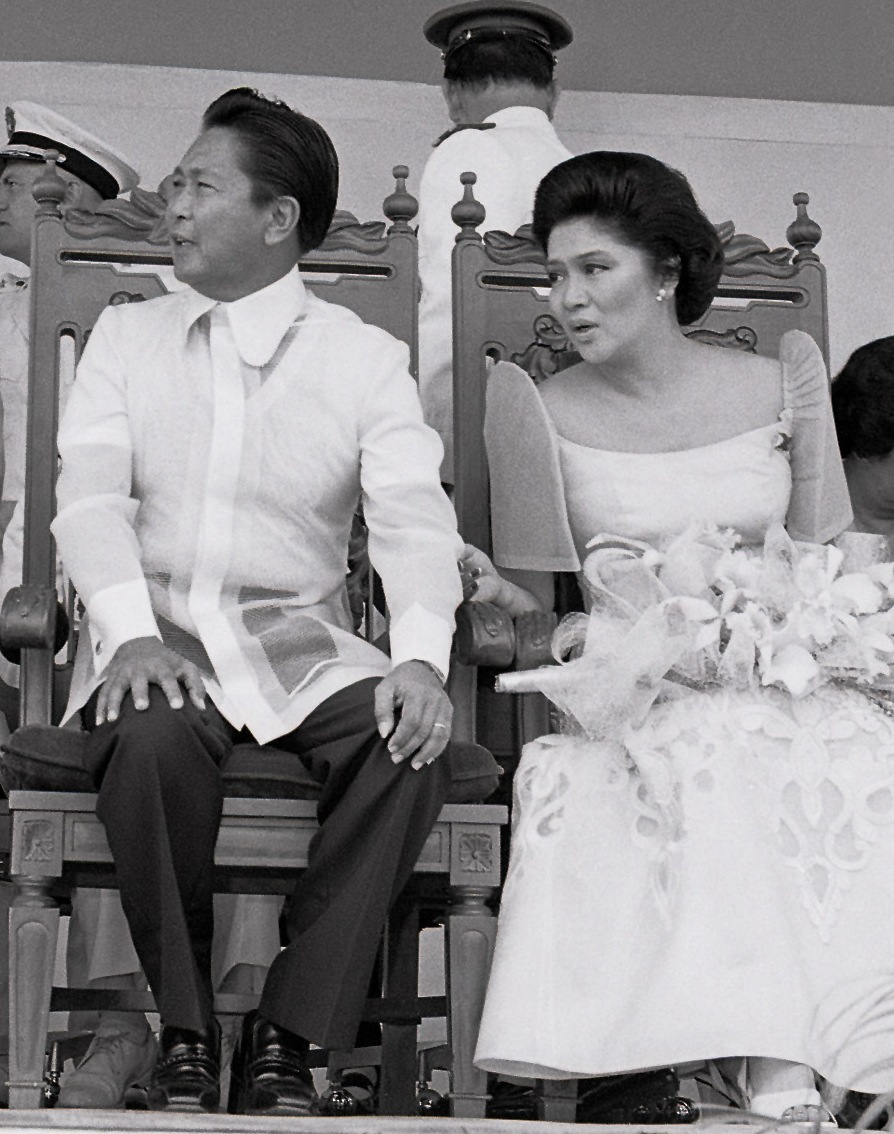
Ferdinand Marcos (pictured with his wife Imelda) was a Philippine dictator and kleptocrat. His regime was infamous for its corruption.

The Chinese Civil War ended in splitting the Republic of China under Chiang Kai-shek and the People's Republic of China under Mao Zedong. Mao established the People's Republic of China as a one-party communist state under his governing ideology of Maoism. While the People's Republic of China was initially aligned with the Soviet Union, relations between the two countries deteriorated as the Soviet Union underwent de-Stalinization in the late-1950s. Mao consolidated his control of the People's Republic of China with the Cultural Revolution in the 1960s, which involved the destruction of all elements of capitalism and traditionalism in China. Deng Xiaoping took power as the de facto leader of China after Mao's death and implemented reforms to restore stability following the Cultural Revolution and reestablish market economics. Chiang Kai-shek continued to rule as dictator of the National government's rump state in Taiwan until he died in 1975.

Marxist and nationalist movements became popular in Southeast Asia as a response to colonial control and the subsequent Japanese occupation of Southeast Asia, with both ideologies facilitating the creation of dictatorships after World War II. Communist dictatorships in the region aligned with China following the latter's establishment as a communist state. Three Communist dictatorships were formed in Southeast Asia: North Vietnam, Laos, and Kampuchea. North Vietnam conquered South Vietnam at the end of the Vietnam War, and the two merged into a single Communist country. Anti-Communist dictators also ruled in the region. Suharto became dictator in Indonesia after taking power in 1967. Ngo Dinh Diem ruled South Vietnam as a dictator until the 1963 military coup. Ferdinand Marcos ruled Philippines as a dictator until the People Power Revolution in 1986. A socialist military dictatorship was also created separately from the Communist governments in Burma until it was overthrown in 1988 and replaced by a new military dictatorship.

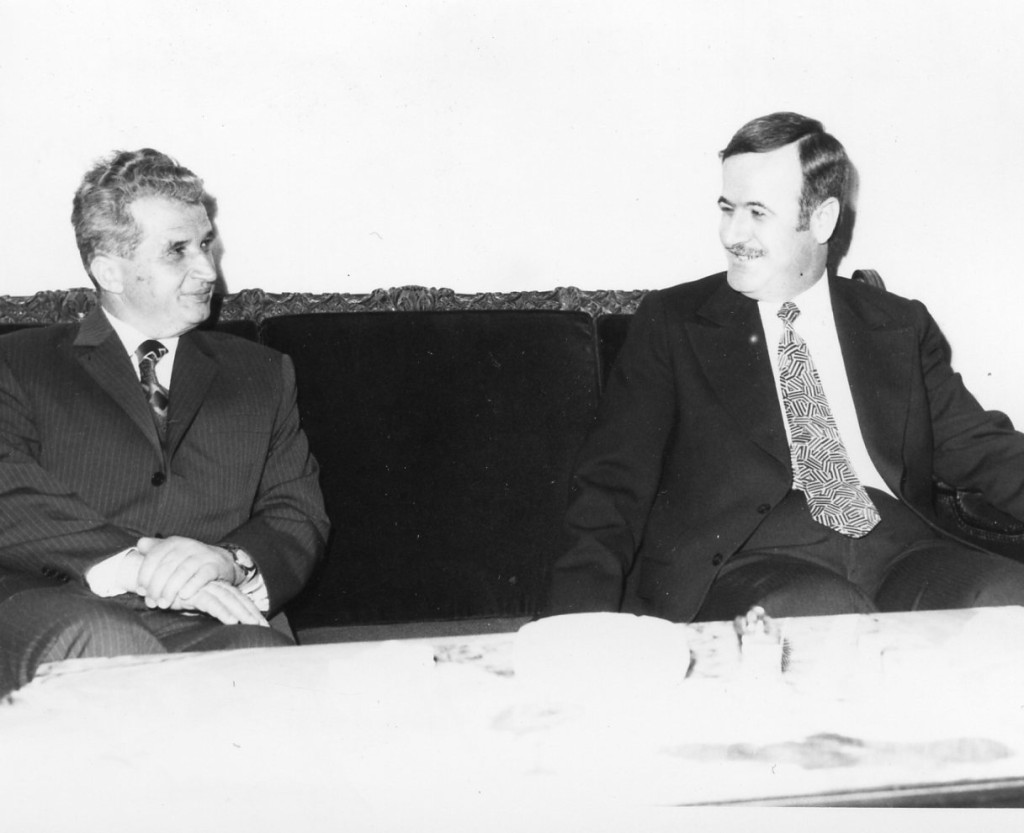
Nicolae Ceaușescu (left) attending a stage event with Hafez al-Assad (right), during his state visit to Syria

A similar phenomenon took place in Korea, where Kim Il Sung created a Soviet-backed communist dictatorship in North Korea and Syngman Rhee created a US-backed nationalist dictatorship in South Korea. Park Chung Hee and Chun Doo-hwan would continue the pattern of dictatorship in South Korea until the June Democratic Struggle in 1987, which enabled the country's first free and fair elections and its subsequent democratization under Roh Tae Woo. The Middle East was decolonized during the Cold War, and many nationalist movements gained strength post-independence. These nationalist movements supported non-alignment, keeping most Middle Eastern dictatorships out of the American and Soviet spheres of influence. These movements supported pan-Arab Nasserism during most of the Cold War, but they were largely replaced by Islamic nationalism by the 1980s. Several Middle Eastern countries were the subject of military coups in the 1950s and 1960s, including Iraq, Syria, North Yemen, and South Yemen. A 1953 coup overseen by the American and British governments restored Mohammad Reza Pahlavi as the absolute monarch of Iran, who in turn was overthrown during the Iranian Revolution of 1979 that established Ruhollah Khomeini as the Supreme Leader of Iran under a Shia Islamist government, with Ali Khamenei taking over after Khomeini's death.

==== Europe ====
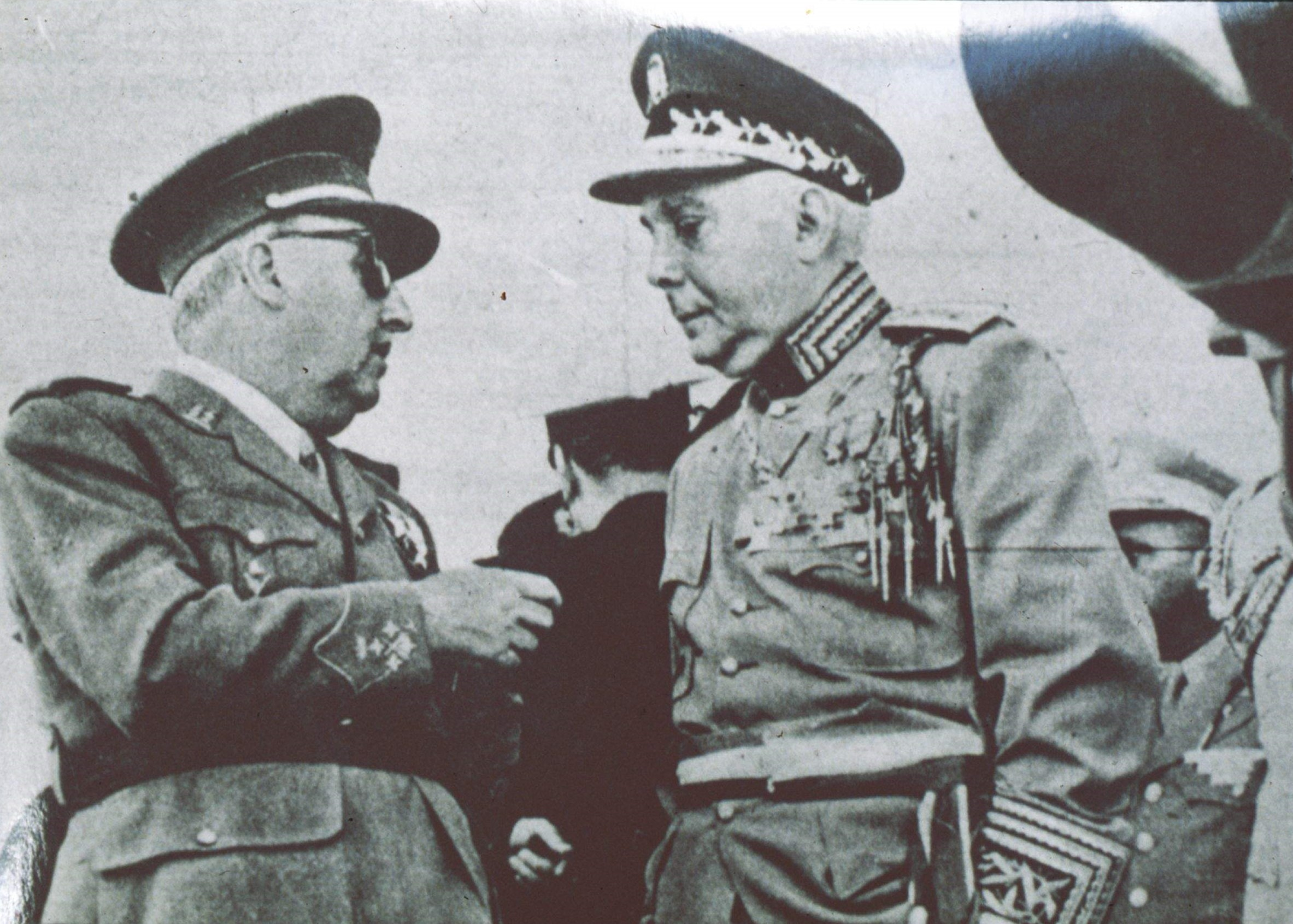
Spanish dictator Francisco Franco with Dominican dictator Rafael Trujillo, 1954

António de Oliveira Salazar became Prime Minister of Portugal in 1932 and established the Estado Novo. Francisco Franco took power in Spain after leading the Nationalist faction to victory in the Spanish Civil War and became a dictator in 1939.

During World War II, many countries of Central and Eastern Europe had been occupied by the Soviet Union. When the war ended, these countries were incorporated into the Soviet sphere of influence, and the Soviet Union exercised control over their governments. Josip Broz Tito declared a communist government in Yugoslavia during World War II, which was initially aligned with the Soviet Union. The relations between the countries were strained by Soviet attempts to influence Yugoslavia, leading to the Tito–Stalin split in 1948. Albania was established as a communist dictatorship under Enver Hoxha in 1944. It was initially aligned with Yugoslavia, but its alignment shifted throughout the Cold War between Yugoslavia, the Soviet Union, and China. The stability of the Soviet Union weakened in the 1980s. The Soviet economy became unsustainable, and communist governments lost the support of intellectuals and their population in general. In 1989, the Soviet Union was dissolved, and communism was abandoned by the countries of Central and Eastern Europe through a series of revolutions.

==== Latin America ====
Military dictatorships remained prominent in Latin America during the Cold War, though the number of coups declined starting in the 1980s. Between 1967 and 1991, 12 Latin American countries underwent at least one military coup, with Haiti and Honduras experiencing three and Bolivia experiencing eight. A one-party communist dictatorship was formed in Cuba when the dictatorship of Fulgencio Batista, weakened by an American arms embargo against his regime, was overthrown in the Cuban Revolution, creating the only Soviet-backed dictatorship in the western hemisphere. To maintain power, Chilean dictator Augusto Pinochet organized Operation Condor with other South American dictators to facilitate cooperation between their respective intelligence agencies and secret police organizations.

=== Hereditary dictatorship ===
Hereditary dictatorships are characterized by the dictator keeping political power within their family due to personal choice. The successor may be groomed during their lifetime, as was the case for Bashar al-Assad and his brother Bassel, or a member of their family may manoeuvre to take control of the dictatorship after the dictator's death, similar to the case of Ramfis Trujillo.

=== 21st century dictatorships ===
The 2025 V-Dem Electoral and Liberal Democracy Indices

0.90–1.00
0.80–0.89
0.70–0.79
0.60–0.69
0.50–0.59
0.40–0.49
0.30–0.39
0.20–0.29
0.10–0.19
0.00–0.09
No data

The nature of dictatorship changed in much of the world at the onset of the 21st century. Between the 1990s and the 2000s, most dictators moved away from being "larger-than-life figures" that controlled the populace through terror and isolated themselves from the global community. This was replaced by a trend of developing a positive public image to maintain support among the populace and moderating rhetoric to integrate with the global community. In contrast to the overtly repressive nature of 20th-century dictatorships, authoritarian strongmen of the 21st century are sometimes labeled "spin dictators", rulers who attempt to monopolize power by authoritarian upgrading, appealing to democratic sentiments and covertly pursue repressive measures; such as embracing modern technology, manipulation of information content, regulation of cyberspace, slandering dissidents, etc. On the other hand, a handful of dictators like Kim Jong Un rule with deadly repression, violence and state-terrorism to establish extensive securitization through fear, in line with many 20th century dictatorships.

The development of the internet and digital communication in the 21st century have prompted dictatorships to shift from traditional means of control to digital ones, including the use of artificial intelligence to analyze mass communications, internet censorship to restrict the flow of information, and troll farms to manipulate public opinion. 21st-century dictatorships regularly hold sham elections with massive approval ratings, for seeking public legitimacy and maintaining the autocrat's image as a popular figure loved by the masses. The manipulated election results are often weaponized as propaganda tools in information warfare, to galvanize supporters of the dictatorships against dissidents as well as to manufacture compliance of the masses by publicizing falsified data figures. Another objective is to portray the dictator as the guardian figure who unifies the country, without whom its security disintegrates and chaos ensues. North Korea is the only country in East Asia to be ruled as a hereditary dictatorship, being led by the Kim family after the death of Kim Il Sung and hands over to his son Kim Jong Il in 1994 and grandson Kim Jong Un in 2011, as of today in the 21st century.

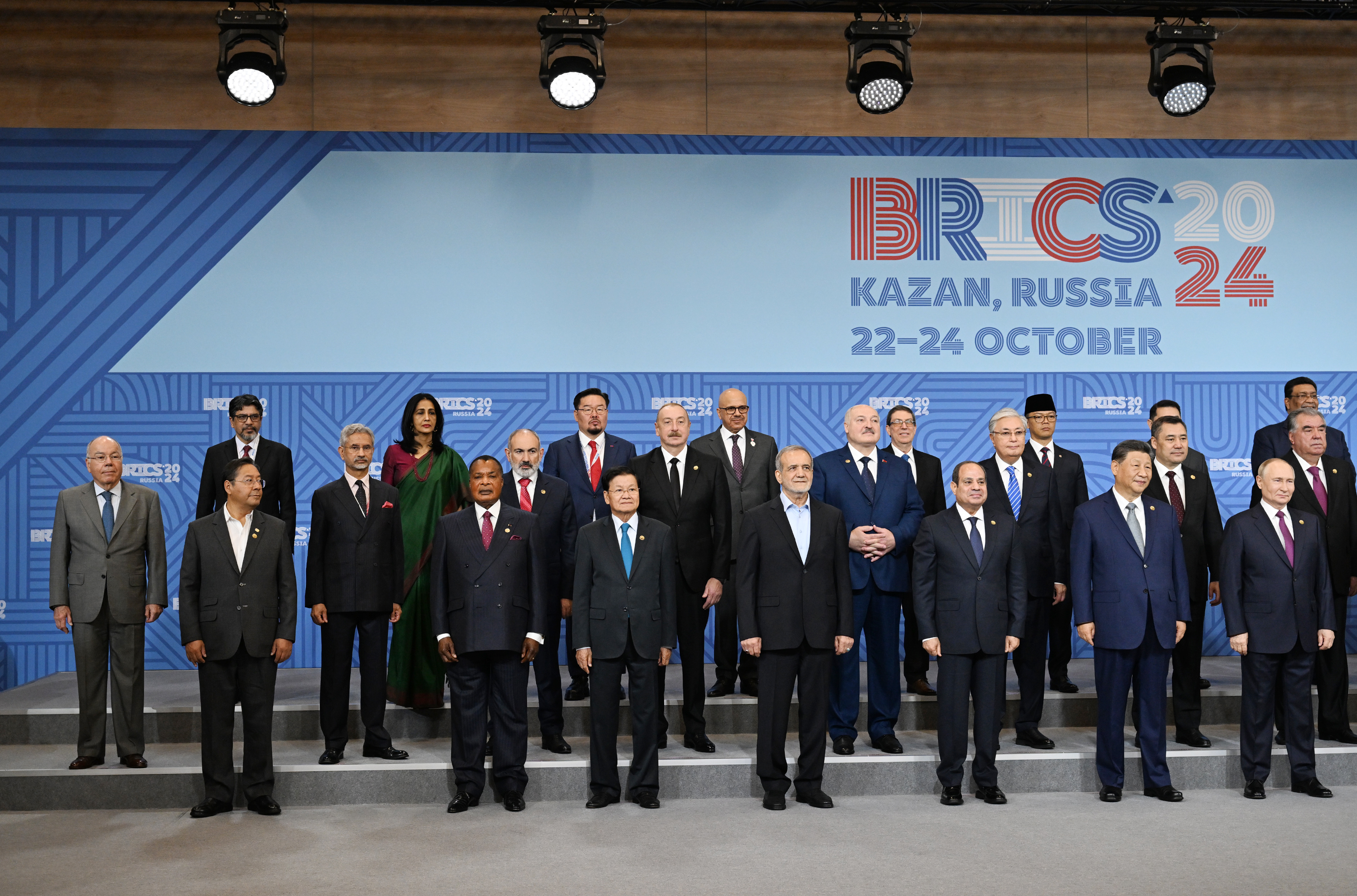
Russia's autocratic leader Vladimir Putin, China's Xi Jinping, Egypt's Abdel Fattah el-Sisi (from r. to l.) and others at the 16th BRICS summit in Kazan, Russia, 24 October 2024

Dictatorship in Europe largely ended after the fall of the Soviet Union in 1991, and the liberalization of most communist states. Belarus under the rule of Alexander Lukashenko has been described as "the last European dictatorship", though the rule of Vladimir Putin in Russia has also been described as a dictatorship. Latin America saw a period of liberalization similar to that of Europe at the end of the Cold War, with Cuba being the only Latin American country that did not experience any degree of liberalization between 1992 and 2010. The countries of Central Asia did not liberalize after the fall of the Soviet Union, instead forming as dictatorships led by former elites of the Communist Party and then later by successive dictators. These countries maintain parliaments and human rights organizations, but these remain under the control of the countries' respective dictators.

The Middle East and North Africa did not undergo liberalization during the third wave of democratisation, and most countries in this region remain dictatorships in the 21st century. Dictatorships in the Middle East and Northern Africa usually take the form of illiberal republics in which a president holds power through unfair elections. Iraq, Israel, Lebanon, and Palestine are the only democratic nations in the region. Although Tunisia was seen as a pillar of the Arab Spring for democracy, by 2023, it was no longer classified as a democracy.

== Economics ==
GDP per capita vs type of political regime. Most countries with dictatorships are poor except for some petrostates.

Most dictatorships exist in countries with high levels of poverty. Poverty has a destabilizing effect on government, causing democracy to fail and regimes to fall more often. The form of government does not correlate with the amount of economic growth, and dictatorships on average grow at the same rate as democracies, though dictatorships have been found to have larger fluctuations. Dictators are more likely to implement long-term investments into the country's economy if they feel secure in their power. Exceptions to the pattern of poverty in dictatorships include oil-rich Middle Eastern dictatorships and the East Asian Tigers during their periods of dictatorship.

The type of economy in a dictatorship can affect how it functions. Economies based on natural resources allow dictators more power, as they can easily extract rents without strengthening or cooperating with other institutions. More complex economies require additional cooperation between the dictator and other groups. The economic focus of a dictatorship often depends on the strength of the opposition, as a weaker opposition allows a dictator to extract additional wealth from the economy through corruption.

== Legitimacy and stability ==
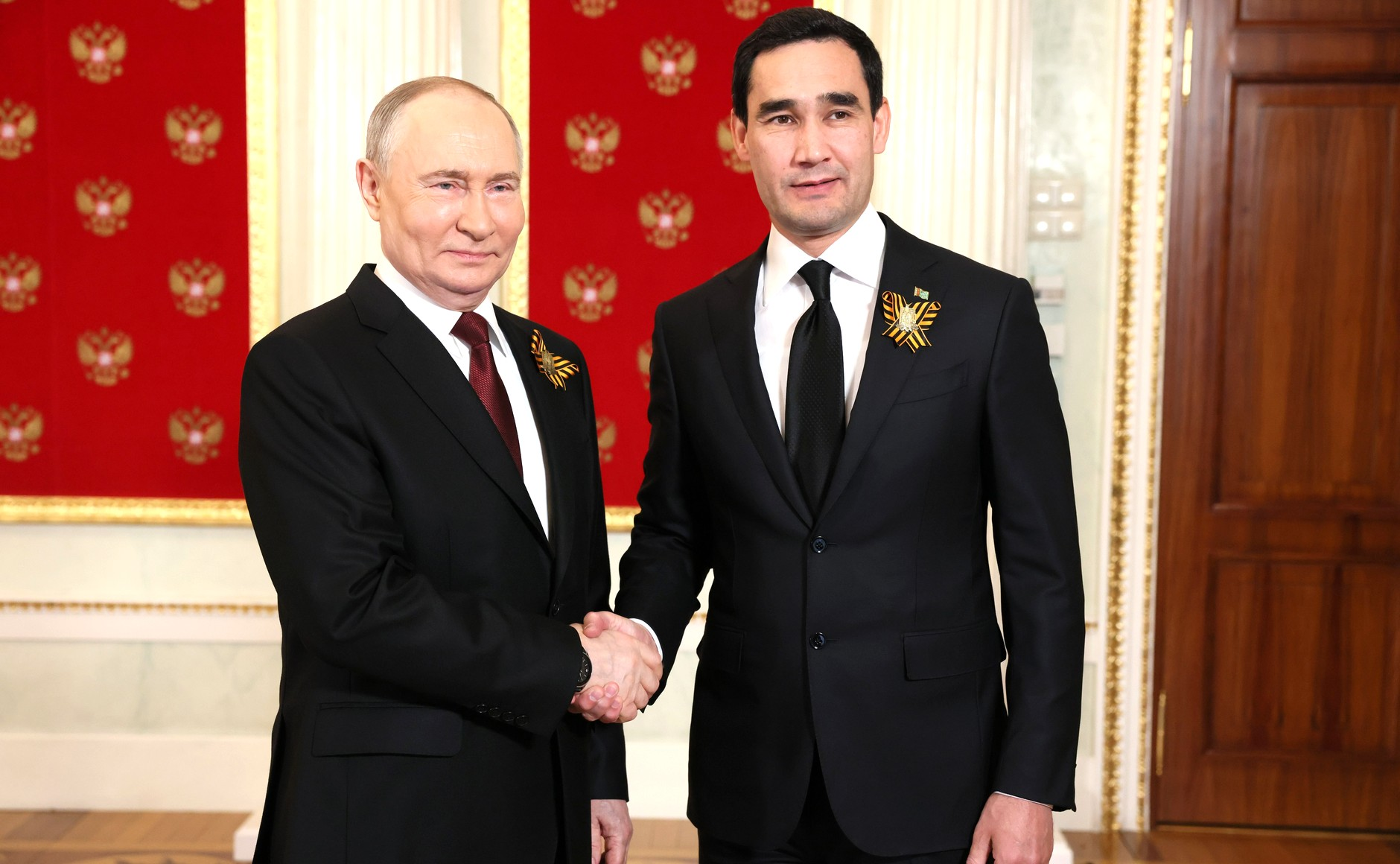
Vladimir Putin and Serdar Berdimuhammedov

Several factors determine the stability of a dictatorship, and they must maintain some degree of popular support to prevent resistance groups from growing. This may be ensured through incentives, such as distribution of financial resources or promises of security, or it may be through political repression, in which failing to support the regime is punished. Stability can be weakened when opposition groups grow and unify or when elites are not loyal to the regime. One-party dictatorships are generally more stable and last longer than military or personalist dictatorships.

Dictatorships that take power during revolutions tend to be exceptionally durable and long-lasting. According to a study, autocracies that emerged from revolutions lasted, on average, as long as three times as nonrevolutionary regimes and collapsed at a one-fifth at the rate of nonrevolutionary systems. They tend to face contestation such as coups and large-scale protests at a smaller rate, and have more tools to thwart them when such threats emerge. Revolutionary dictatorships have cohesive elite structures that minimize the chances of defections and tend to stay loyal during times of turmoil. They have strong coercive institutions, including loyal militaries that protect the ruling regime's status. Dictatorships that emerged from social revolutions also tend to lack independent centers of power that allow for opposition.

A dictatorship may fall because of a military coup, foreign intervention, negotiation, or popular revolution. A military coup is often carried out when a regime is threatening the country's stability or during periods of societal unrest. Coups are exceptionally rare in revolutionary autocracies. Foreign intervention takes place when another country seeks to topple a regime by invading the country or supporting the opposition. A dictator may negotiate the end of a regime if it has lost legitimacy or if a violent removal seems likely. The revolution takes place when the opposition group grows large enough that elites in the regime cannot suppress it or choose not to. Negotiated removals are more likely to end in democracy, while removals by force are more likely to result in a new dictatorial regime. A dictator that has concentrated significant power is more likely to be exiled, imprisoned, or killed after ouster, and accordingly, they are more likely to refuse negotiation and cling to power.

Dictatorships are typically more aggressive than democracy when in conflict with other nations, as dictators do not have to fear the electoral costs of war. Military dictatorships are more prone to conflict due to the inherent military strength associated with such a regime, and personalist dictatorships are more prone to conflict due to the weaker institutions to check the dictator's power. In the 21st century, dictatorships have moved toward greater integration with the global community and increasingly attempt to present themselves as democratic. Dictatorships are often recipients of foreign aid on the condition that they make advances toward democratization. A study found that dictatorships that engage in oil drilling are more likely to remain in power, with 70.63% of the dictators who engage in oil drilling still being in power after five years of dictatorship, while only 59.92% of the non-oil producing dictators survive the first five years.

=== Elections ===
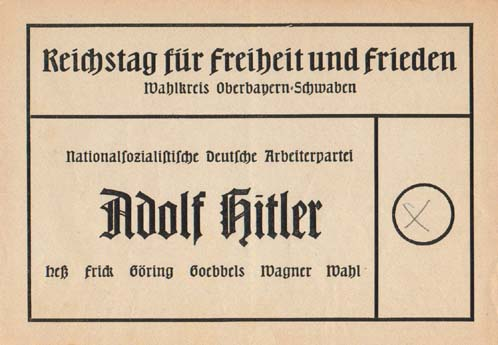
An electoral slip in the 1936 German parliamentary election. Adolf Hitler and his inner circle are the only option.

Most dictatorships hold elections to maintain legitimacy and stability, but these elections are typically uncompetitive and the opposition is not permitted to win, often referred to as "sham elections". Elections allow a dictatorship to exercise some control over the opposition by setting the terms under which the opposition challenges the regime. Elections are also used to control elites within the dictatorship by requiring them to compete with one another and incentivizing them to build support with the populace, allowing the most popular and most competent elites to be promoted in the regime. Elections also support the legitimacy of a dictatorship by presenting the image of democracy, establishing plausible deniability of its status as a dictatorship for both the populace and foreign governments. Should a dictatorship fail, elections also permit dictators and elites to accept defeat without fearing violent recourse. Dictatorships may influence the results of an election through electoral fraud, intimidation or bribing of candidates and voters, use of state resources such as media control, manipulation of electoral laws, restricting who may run as a candidate, or disenfranchising demographics that may oppose the dictatorship.

In the 20th century, most dictatorships held elections in which voters could only choose to support the dictatorship, with only one-quarter of partisan dictatorships permitting opposition candidates to participate. Since the end of the Cold War, more dictatorships have established "semi-competitive" elections in which opposition is allowed to participate in elections but is not allowed to win, with approximately two-thirds of dictatorships permitting opposition candidates in 2018. Opposition parties in dictatorships may be restricted by preventing them from campaigning, banning more popular opposition parties, preventing opposition members from forming a party, or requiring that candidates be a member of the ruling party. Dictatorships may hold semi-competitive elections to qualify for foreign aid, to demonstrate a dictator's control over the government, or to incentivize the party to expand its information-gathering capacity, particularly at the local level. Semi-competitive elections also have the effect of incentivizing members of the ruling party to provide better treatment of citizens so they will be chosen as party nominees due to their popularity.

=== Violence ===
In a dictatorship, violence is used to coerce or repress all opposition to the dictator's rule, and the strength of a dictatorship depends on its use of violence. This violence is frequently exercised through institutions such as military or police forces. The use of violence by a dictator is frequently most severe during the first few years of a dictatorship, because the regime has not yet solidified its rule and more detailed information for targeted coercion is not yet available. As the dictatorship becomes more established, it moves away from violence by resorting to the use of other coercive measures, such as restricting people's access to information and tracking the political opposition. Dictators are incentivized to avoid the use of violence once a reputation of violence is established, as it damages the dictatorship's other institutions and poses a threat to the dictator's rule should government forces become disloyal.

Institutions that coerce the opposition through the use of violence may serve different roles or they may be used to counterbalance one another to prevent one institution from becoming too powerful. Secret police are used to gather information about specific political opponents and carry out targeted acts of violence against them, paramilitary forces defend the regime from coups, and formal militaries defend the dictatorship during foreign invasions and major civil conflicts.

Terrorism is less common in dictatorships. Allowing the opposition to have representation in the regime, such as through a legislature, further reduces the likelihood of terrorist attacks in a dictatorship. Military and one-party dictatorships are more likely to experience terrorism than personalist dictatorships, as these regimes are under more pressure to undergo institutional change in response to terrorism.

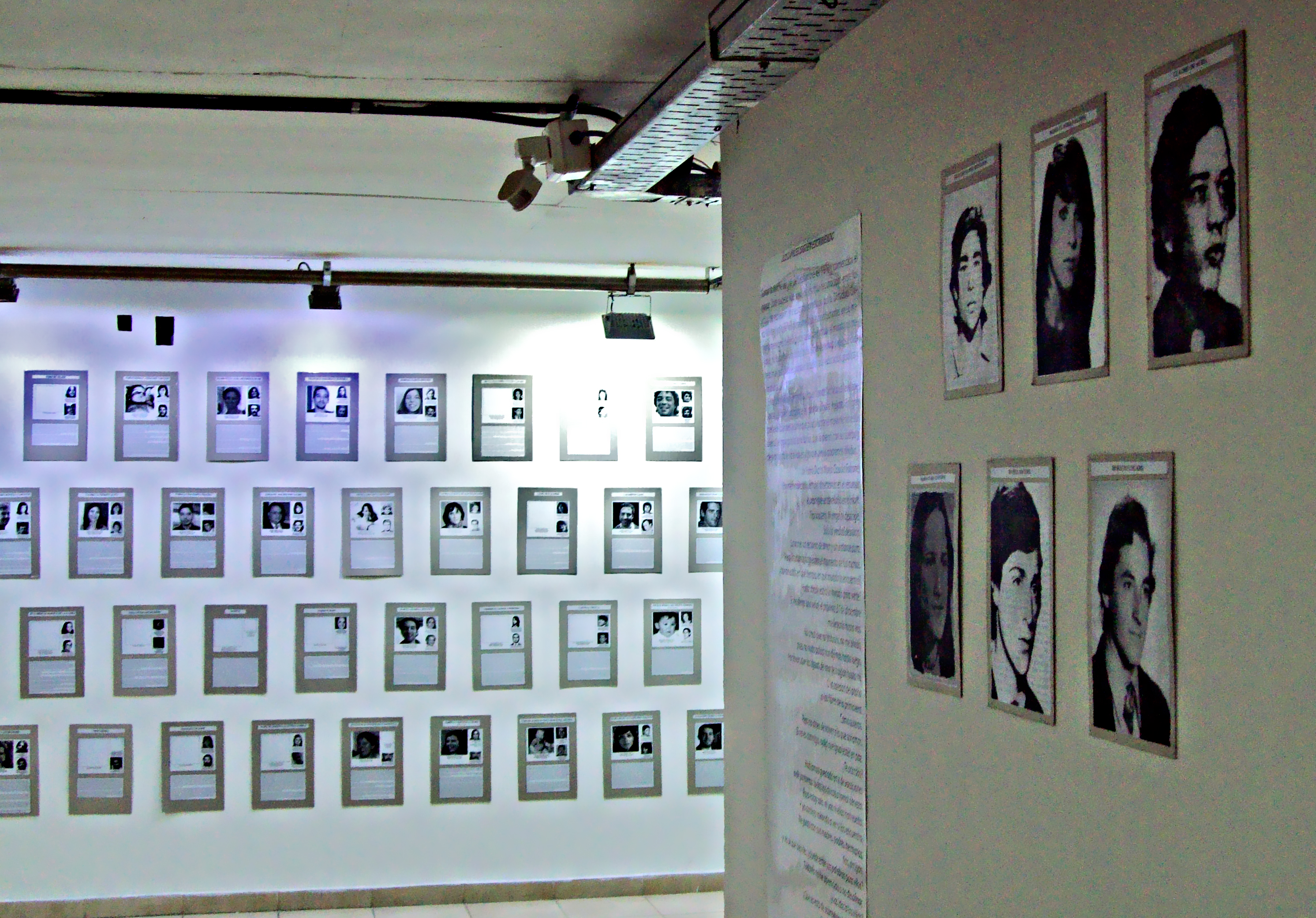
Photographs of victims of the civic-military dictatorship of Argentina

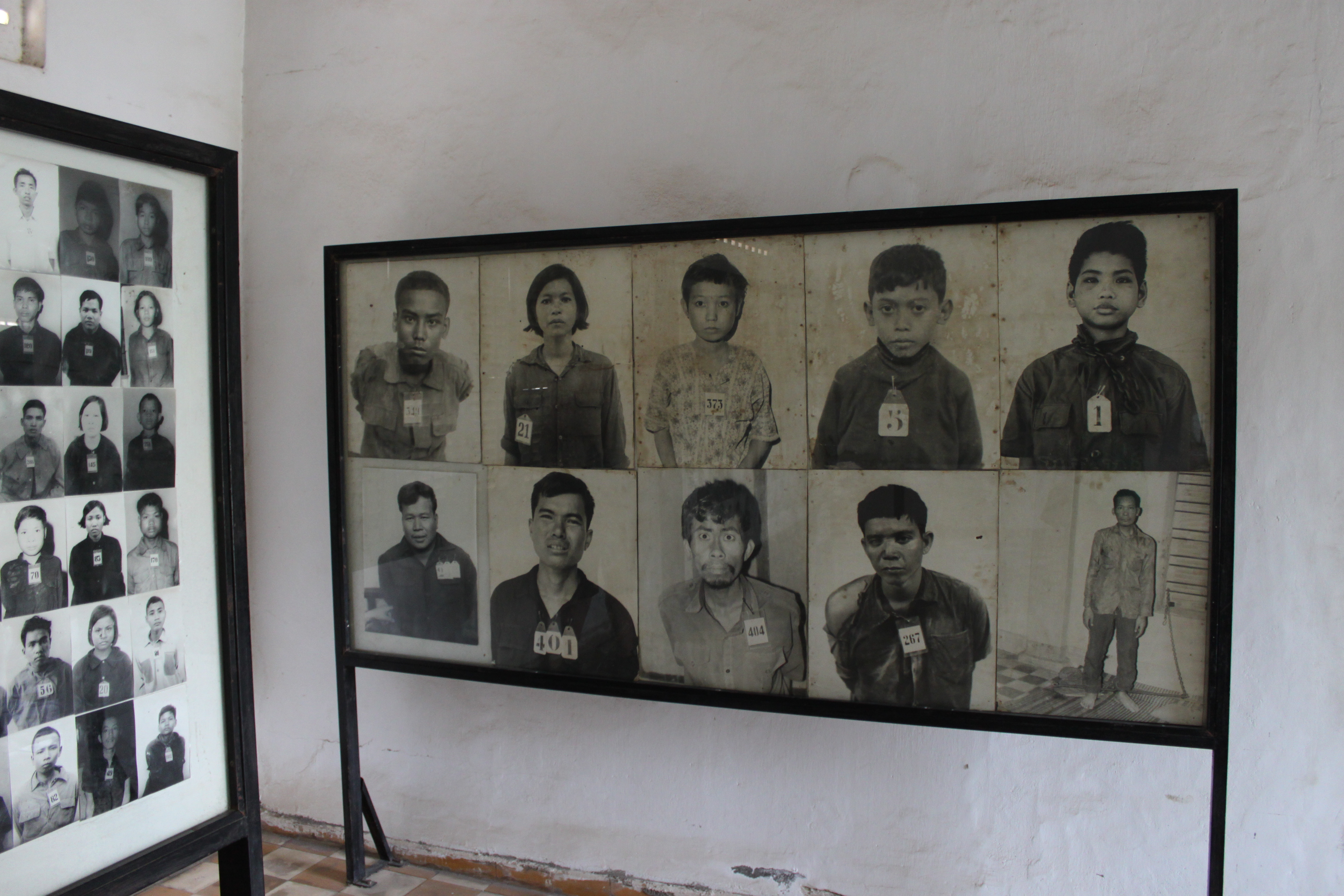
Rooms of the Tuol Sleng Genocide Museum contain thousands of photos taken by the Khmer Rouge of their victims.

== See also ==
- Benevolent dictatorship
- Constitutional dictatorship
- Democracy-Dictatorship Index
- Despotism
- Elective dictatorship
- Generalissimo
- List of cults of personality
- List of titles used by dictators
- List of totalitarian regimes
- Maximum Leader (disambiguation)
- People's democratic dictatorship
- Strongman
- Supreme Leader (disambiguation)

== Bibliography ==
- Ezrow, Natasha M.; Frantz, Erica (2011). Dictators and Dictatorships: Understanding Authoritarian Regimes and Their Leaders. Bloomsbury. ISBN 9781441196828.
- Galván, Javier A. (21 December 2012). Latin American Dictators of the 20th Century: The Lives and Regimes of 15 Rulers. McFarland. ISBN 978-0-7864-6691-7.
- Geddes, Barbara; Wright, Joseph; Frantz, Erica (2018). How Dictatorships Work. Cambridge University Press. ISBN 9781107115828.
- Gellately, Robert (2007). Lenin, Stalin and Hitler: The Age of Social Catastrophe. London: Jonathan Cape. ISBN 9780224062831.
- Lee, Stephen J. (2016). European Dictatorships 1918–1945 (4th ed.). Routledge. ISBN 9781315646176.
- Levitsky, Steven; Way, Lucan (2022). Revolution and Dictatorship: The Violent Origins of Durable Authoritarianism. Princeton University Press. ISBN 978-0691169521.
- Staar, Richard F. (1982). Communist Regimes in Eastern Europe (4th ed.). Hoover Institution Press. ISBN 9780817976934.
