= Maximum Leader =

The term "Maximum Leader" (Spanish: Líder Máximo) has been used by, or to describe, a number of politicians, including:

- Plutarco Elías Calles, Mexican revolutionary and President (1924-1928) was known as the "Maximum Leader of the Mexican Revolution"; he was the power behind the throne from 1928 to 1934 during the period known as Maximato.
- Fidel Castro, Cuban revolutionary and political leader, served as the First Secretary of the Communist Party of Cuba (1965–2011); the title is not utilised in Cuba
- Omar Torrijos, Panamian dictator (1968–1981); recognised as "Maximum Leader of the Panamanian Revolution" in the 1972 Constitution of Panama
- Manuel Noriega, Panamian dictator (1983–1989); the title was officially given to him in 1989 by the National Assembly of Panama
- Massimo D'Alema, Italian prime minister (1998–2000); the title was chiefly used in a humorous vein by the media.

== See also ==
- Great Leader
- Paramount Leader
- Supreme Leader
