= Generalissimo (disambiguation) =

Generalissimo is the rank of 'supreme general' .

Generalissimo may also refer to:

- Generalissimo (30 Rock), the 30 Rock episode
- Generalissimo El Busho, Ted Rall cartoon parody
- A short-lived henchman of Dr Evil in the first Austin Powers film

== See also ==
- Supreme Leader (disambiguation)
- Paramount leader
- Supreme Commander (disambiguation)
- Admiralissimo
