= List of titles used by dictators =

This is a list of titles used by dictators, authoritarian political leaders.

== Before the Second World War ==
- The ruler of Circassia, Muhammad Amin Asiyalav, used the titles "Leader-Superior" and "Representative/Delegate".
- The ruler of Buenos Aires Province and the Argentine Confederation Juan Manuel de Rosas, was nicknamed "Restorer of the Laws" (Note: The full title was "Restorer of the Laws and Institutions of the Province of Buenos Aires". It was given to Rosas by the House of Representatives of Buenos Aires on 18 December 1829. After the Desert Campaign he was called the "Conqueror of the desert" (Conquistador del desierto). As his dictatorship became more repressive, Rosas became known as the "Tiger of Palermo", after his main residence in Palermo, then located outside the town of Buenos Aires.) and Caudillo.
- The Supreme Ruler of Russia Alexander Kolchak, head of the military dictatorship in Russia during the Russian Civil War in the territories controlled by the White movement.
- The Paraguayan President José Gaspar Rodríguez de Francia used, among other titles, El Supremo (The Supreme) and Dictador Perpetuo (Perpetual Dictator).

== In the 1940s and parts of the 1950s ==
Such titles used by heads of state and/or government during the Second World War include:

- Führer ("leader" or "guide") Adolf Hitler, from 1934 to 1945, dictator of Germany (formally "Führer and Reich Chancellor").
- Führer und Lehrer Joseph Stalin, late 1940s in East Germany
- Joseph Stalin, dictator of Soviet Union has been referred to as Father of Nations, "Great Leader", "General Secretary", "Generalisimus"
- Duce (from Latin dux meaning "guide") Benito Mussolini, from 1925 to 1943 dictator of Italy (formally "Head of Government").
- Vodca ("Leader") monsignor Jozef Tiso, from 1942 self-styled, in Slovakia, President 1939–1945 (acting to 26 October 1939).
- Vodja ("Leader"), a title used by Milan Stojadinović in Yugoslavia.
- Conducător ("leader"), a title used by Ion Antonescu in Romania.
- El Caudillo de España ("the Chieftain of Spain") Generalísimo Francisco Franco Bahamonde, Jefe de Estado (Chief of State) and "Chief of Government" (Prime Minister).
- Marszałek (marshal) Józef Piłsudski, dictator of Poland from 1926 to 1935.
- Poglavnik Nezavisne Države Hrvatske ("Chief of the Independent State of Croatia") Ante Pavelić, leader of the Nazi-Fascist Italy puppet government in Croatia.
- Maréchal ("Marshal") – Between 1940 and 1944, when Marshal Philippe Pétain was Chief of the French State (Vichy France), the name for his military rank became synonymous with Pétain.
- Nemzetvezető ("leader of the nation"), a title used by Ferenc Szálasi, the chief of the Nyilaskeresztes Párt (Arrow Cross Party) who succeeded Miklós Horthy in Hungary.
- Arhigos ("chief" or "leader"), a title used by General Ioannis Metaxas of Greece's 4th of August Regime.
- Adipati ("chief of state" or "generalissimo"), the title used by Ba Maw of the Japanese satellite State of Burma
- Udhëheqësi [i partisë dhe i popullit] ynë i madh, Our great guide [of the party and of the people], the most common title used by Albanian communist dictator Enver Hoxha.

== Postwar era and the Cold War ==
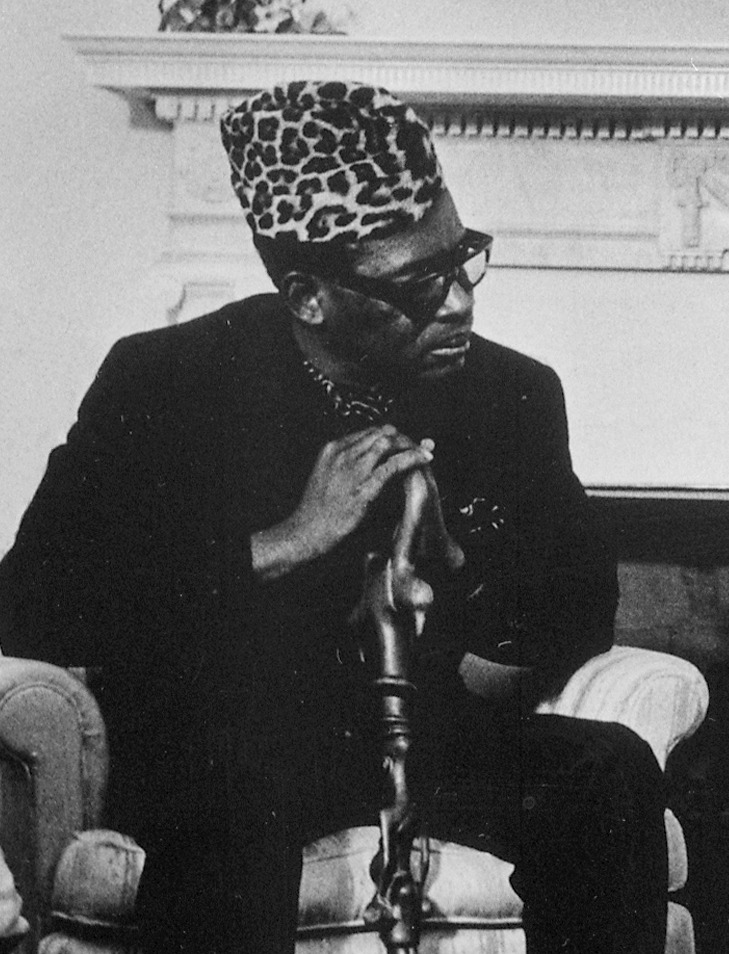
Mobutu Sese Seko, Zaire's longtime dictator, embezzled over $5 billion from his country.

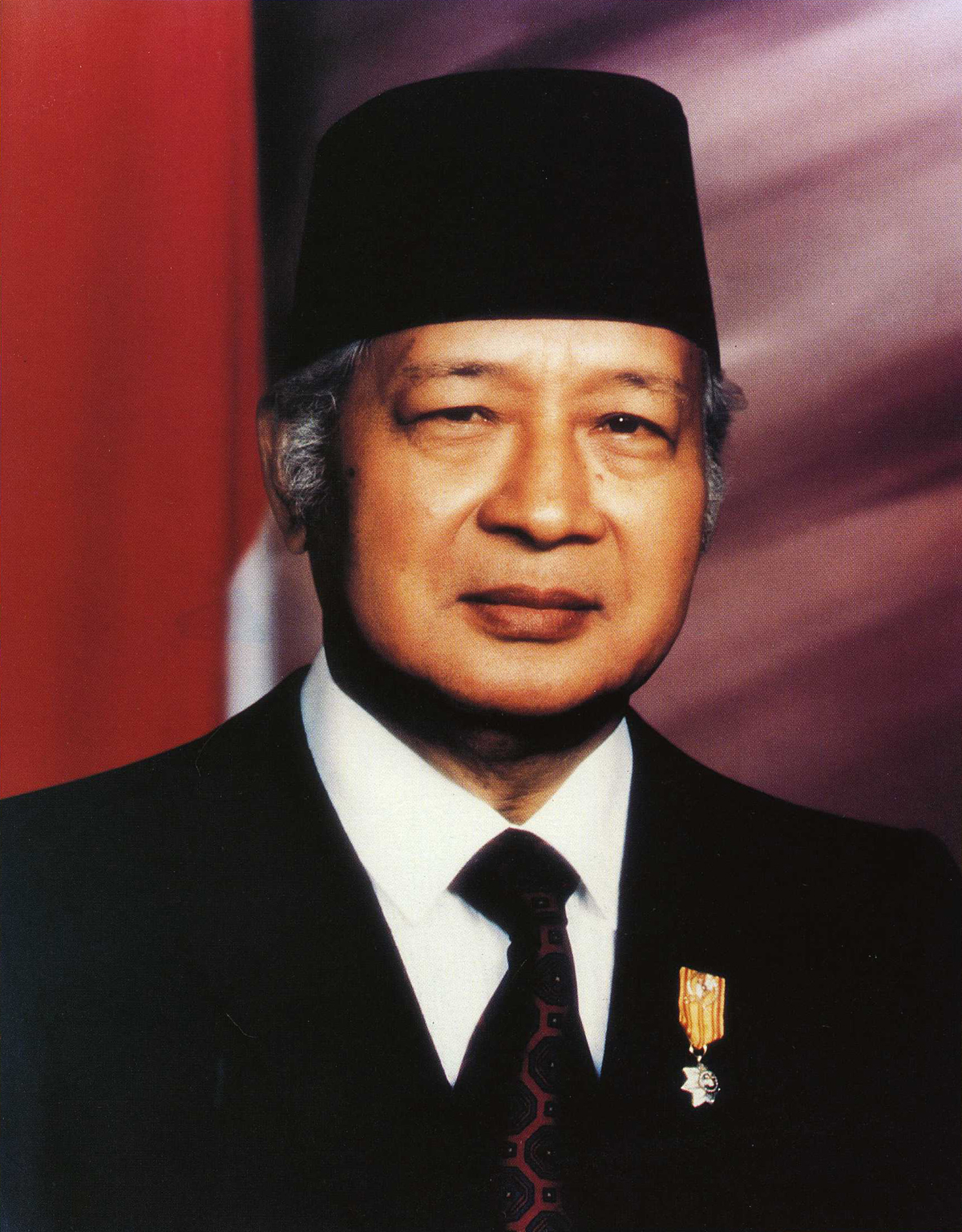
Suharto, Indonesia's longtime dictator, embezzled up to $35 billion from his country.

- Idi Amin's official title while in office as President of Uganda was 'His Excellency, President for Life, Field Marshal Al Hadji Doctor Idi Amin Dada, VC, DSO, MC, Lord of All the Beasts of the Earth and Fishes of the Seas and Conqueror of the British Empire in Africa in General and Uganda in Particular'. He also claimed to be the uncrowned King of Scotland.
- Ali Soilih, the former president of the State of the Comoros, took on the title "Monzogi" which means "the Guide".
- In the North Korean hereditary system, Kim Il Sung and Kim Jong Il used the titles Great Leader and Dear Leader respectively. Kim Jong Un uses Supreme Leader as his title.
- Muammar Gaddafi, once de facto Libyan head of state, used the title "Guide of the First of September Great Revolution of the Socialist People's Libyan Arab Jamahiriya" and "Brotherly Leader and Guide of the Revolution". In 1990 he was legally designated supreme leader by the General People's Congress. Gaddafi officially granted himself many other titles over his 42-year rule, most famously the military rank of colonel. Other titles included "King of Kings of Africa", "Dean of Arab Rulers", "Imam of Muslims" and "Amghar of the Taureg", among others. Arab nationalist leader Gamal Abdel Nasser also awarded him the title of "Keeper of Arab Nationalism".
- In the People's Republic of China, Communist Party Chairman Mao Zedong used the titles, "the great leader, the great supreme commander, the great teacher and the great helmsman" during the Cultural Revolution.
- In Romania, Communist Party General Secretary and President Nicolae Ceaușescu had the same title, Conducător (Romanian for leader), as earlier dictator Marshal Ion Antonescu.
- U.S.-backed Indonesian dictator Suharto was awarded the title of "Father of Development" by the Golkar and Armed Forces-controlled Parliament in 1983.
- Saparmurat Niyazov, the late president for life of Turkmenistan, and former First Secretary of the Turkmen Communist Party and later of the Democratic Party of Turkmenistan (the country's only political party), assumed from 22 October 1993 the unique, paternalistic national title Turkmenbashi (Türkmenbaşy in Turkmen), which means "Head of (all) the Turkmens".
- In Mali, Moussa Traoré gave himself the title President for Life, but was deposed in 1991.
- Pakistani general Pervez Musharraf, called himself "chief executive" after 1999 coup.
- Sheikh Hasina, deposed Awami League leader and Bangladeshi dictator, used the titles "Mother of Humanity" and "Desh Netri" (Country's leader).
- Jean-Bédel Bokassa would proclaim the Central African Empire in 1976, and in a lavish coronation ceremony the following year, awarded himself the full title of "Emperor of Central Africa by the will of the Central African people, united within the national political party, the MESAN".
- In Ba'athist Syria, the Syrian dictator Hafez al-Assad was referred to in state newspapers as "Lebanon's Saviour," "Gallant Knight," "Nation's Teacher," "The Father," "Comrade," and "Leader." However, the title that became most closely associated with him was "Eternal Leader."

== See also ==
- Supreme Leader (disambiguation)
