= Examples of totalitarian regimes =

Within the academic context, the concept of totalitarianism has been applied to several regimes, with much debate and disagreements, most notably about the Soviet Union, Fascist Italy, Nazi Germany, the Empire of Japan under Kokkashugi, Francoist Spain, Ba'athist Syria, and Ba'athist Iraq. Totalitarianism represents an extreme version of authoritarianism. Western theories of totalitarianism generally center upon a specifically "utopian" and "revolutionary" ideology seeking to completely transform a society.

== Bolshevik Revolution and the Soviet Union ==
The Encyclopaedia Britannica Online and various academics observed that the policies of Vladimir Lenin, the first leader of the Soviet Union, contributed to the establishment of a totalitarian system in the USSR. While some historians, such as Leszek Kołakowski, believed Stalinist totalitarianism to be a continuation of Leninism, and directly called Lenin's government the first totalitarian regime to appear, others including Hannah Arendt argued that there was rupture between Stalinist totaliarianism and Leninism, and that Leninism offered other various outcomes besides Stalinism, including "a mere one-party dictatorship as opposed to full-blown totalitarianism". Arendt believed Stalinist totalitarianism to be a part of a hypernational historically specific phenomenon that also included Nazism.

The debate on whether Lenin's regime was totalitarian is a part of a debate between the totalitarian or traditionalist and neo-traditionalist schools rooted in the early years of the Cold War and also described as "conservative" and "anti-Communist" by historian Ronald Suny; and the revisionist school, which is represented by such historians as Richard Pipes. To Pipes, not only Stalinism was a mere continuation of Leninism, but more to it, "the Russia of 1917–1924 was no less 'totalitarian' than the Russia of the 1930s"; Pipes compared Lenin to Adolf Hitler and described the former as a precursor of the latter, stating "not only totalitarianism, but Nazism and the Holocaust has a Russian and a Leninist pedigree". The core idea of the "totalitarian approach" is that the Bolshevik Revolution was something artificial and imposed from above by a small group of intellectuals with brute force and "depended on one man", and that Soviet totalitarianism resulted from a "blueprint" of the ideology of the Bolsheviks, the violent culture of Russia, and supposedly deviant personalities of Bolshevik leaders. The revisionists opposed such claims and put an emphasis on history from below and on the genuinely popular nature of the 1917 Russian Revolution, paid much more attention to social history as opposed to the traditional approach that centres on politics, ideology, and personalities of the leaders, and tended to see a discontinuity between Leninism and Stalinism, with the worst excesses of the latter being explained by the economic experiments of the late 1920s, the threat of war with Nazi Germany, and the personality of Joseph Stalin. In turn, the traditionalists and neo-traditionalists dismissed such approach emphasising social history as Marxist.

== Fascist Italy ==
According to Kei Hiruta, it is a popular yet contested position in historiography to exclude Fascist Italy from the list of totalitarian regimes. In The Origins of Totalitarianism (1951), Hannah Arendt disputed that Italy was a totalitarian state, at least until 1938.

== Francoist Spain ==
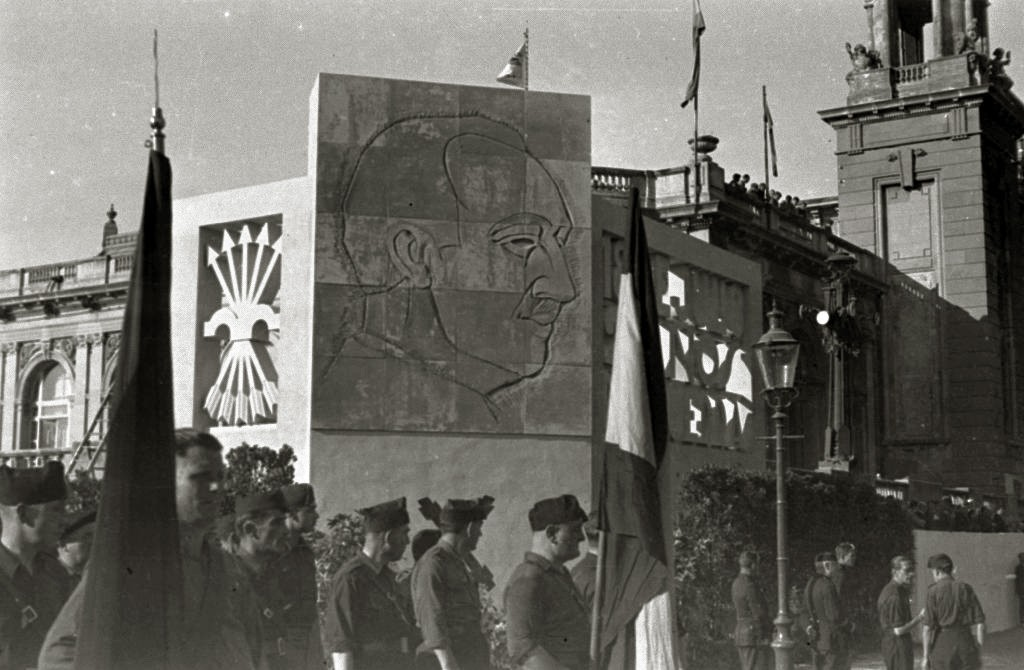
A parade in Francoist Spain celebrating the second anniversary of the 1936 coup and the beginning of the Spanish Civil War. Francoists march under the symbols of the regime - a portrait of Francisco Franco and the yoke and arrows of the party FET y de las JONS headed by Franco

During the Spanish Civil War and the early years of its existence, the regime of Francisco Franco embraced the ideal of a totalitarian state propagated by the Italian fascists, the Nazis, and the Spanish Falangists the and applied the term "totalitarian" towards itself when Franco's rhetoric was influenced by the one of Falangism. Franco stressed the "missionary and totalitarian" nature of the new state that was under construction "as in other countries of totalitarian regime", these being Fascist Italy and Nazi Germany; the ideologues of Francoism formed a concept of totalitarianism as an essentially Spanish method of state organization. In 1942, Franco stopped using the term towards his regime and called for struggle with "Bolshevist totalitarianism".

The Franco regime was commonly defined as totalitarian and as a Spanish variation of fascism until 1964, when Juan Linz challenged this model and instead described Francoism as "authoritarian" because of its "limited degree of political pluralism" caused by struggle between Francoist families such as Falangists and Carlists within the sole legal party FET y de las JONS and the Movimiento Nacional and by other such features as lack of totalitarian ideology. The definition proposed by Linz became an object of a major debate among sociologists, political scientists, and historians; some critics felt that this revision could be understood as a form of acquittal of the Franco regime as it focused on the more benevolent character of the regime in its developmental phase and did not concern its early phase (often called "First Francoism"). Later debates focused on fascism rather than arguing whether Francoism was totalitarian; some historians wrote that it was a typical conservative military dictatorship, and contemporary historians stress its fascist component and describe it as para-fascist or a regime of unfinished fascistization that evolved to a merely authoritarian regime during the Cold War. While Enrique Moradiellos contends that "it is now increasingly rare to define Francoism as a truly fascist and totalitarian regime" even if he also writes that the debates on Francoism have not finished yet, Ismael Saz notes that "it has also begun to be recognised that" Francoism underwent a "totalitarian or quasi-totalitarian, fascist or quasi-fascist" phase.

The contemporary historians who describe Francoism as totalitarian usually limit such description to the early ten to twenty years of the "First Francoism". Stephen J. Lee limits the totalitarian phase of Francoism to 1939–1949, which he describes as "functionally – but not ideologically – totalitarian", and calls Franco "the closest of authoritarian dictators" to "being totalitarian". Julián Sanz Hoya refutes Linz's model of "limited pluralism" as "lame" and "practically inherent to all political systems", and writes that "considering the totalitarian vocation, it is more than evident that Franco's regime in the first twenty years had totalizing pretensions in relation to social control (including private life, morality, and customs), the monopoly of politics and public space, and even the control of the economy (think of the strong interventionism of autarky)." Helen Graham writes that Francoism was "fascist in the 1940s and totalitarian for far longer, until macro-economic changes – which its cupola believed for a long time need not affect the deep form of Spanish society – hollowed out Francoism's own ideological categories (and its 'disciplinary' efficacy), but not its obsession with social control, which it called 'social peace'."

Among the arguments introduced by Linz was the reliance of the Franco regime on Catholicism. He writes: "The heteronomous control of the ideological content of Catholic thought by a universal church and specifically by the Pope is one of the most serious obstacles to the creation of a truly totalitarian system by nondemocratic rulers claiming to implement Catholic social doctrine in their states. This argument is also debated on the grounds that "frequent and saturated references to Francoist Catholic humanism, to the primordial sense of human dignity or to the centrality of the person, all coming from Christian theology, could hardly conceal the fact that the individual was only understood as a citizen to the extent of his adherence to the Catholic, hierarchical and economically privatist community that the military uprising had saved", and that "Catholic values that permeated the conservative ideological substratum" were "precisely what was wielded by the Francoist Spanish political doctrine of the late thirties and early forties to justify the need for the constitution of a totalitarian State at the service and expansion of the Catholic religion."

== Nazi Germany and the Soviet Union ==
According to the Encyclopaedia Britannica Online, the Soviet Union during the Stalinist era, along with Nazi Germany, was a "modern example" of a totalitarian state, being among "the first examples of decentralized or popular totalitarianism, in which the state achieved overwhelming popular support for its leadership". This contrasted with earlier totalitarian states that were imposed on the people, as "every aspect of the Soviet Union's political, economic, cultural, and intellectual life came to be regulated by the Communist Party in a strict and regimented fashion that would tolerate no opposition". According to Peter Rutland writing in 1993, with the death of Stalin, "this was still an oppressive regime, but not a totalitarian one." This view was echoed in 1995 by Igor Krupnik who wrote, "The era of 'social engineering' in the Soviet Union ended with the death of Stalin in 1953 or soon after; and that was the close of the totalitarian regime itself." According to Klaus von Beyme writing in 2014, "The Soviet Union after the death of Stalin moved from totalitarianism to authoritarian rule."

Nazi Germany and the Soviet Union under Stalin are the two main exemplary cases, on the grounds of comparison of which the concept of totalitarianism was founded. The historians who claim that these dictatorships were not totalitarian often reject or doubt the concept of totalitarianism itself. For example, Eric Hobsbawm rejects the description of Stalinism as a totalitarian dictatorship because of its operation, although he concedes that Stalin wanted to achieve total control of the population, and this conclusion, as he says, "throws considerable doubt on the usefulness of the term". Such revisionist historians as Sheila Fitzpatrick openly rejected both the description of Stalinism as a totalitarian dictatorship and the term "totalitarianism". The historian Robert Service in his biography of Stalin wrote that "this was not a totalitarian dictatorship as conventionally defined because Stalin lacked the capacity, even at the height of his power, to secure automatic universal compliance with his wishes."

The historian Gordon A. Craig disputed that the Third Reich was a totalitarian state, unless "in a limited measure", writing, "Except for the Jews, toward whom Hitler had an obsessive hatred, and former and potential dissidents, and homosexuals and Gypsies, most people, at least until the war years, remained surprisingly unrestrained by state control." Such historians as Hans Mommsen and Ian Kershaw openly rejected the concept of totalitarianism in analysis of the Third Reich. Stanley Payne argues that "totalitarianism in terms of total control of institutions is a construct that accurately describes only the most extreme Stalinist type of socialist dictatorships (and possibly the final phase of Nazi Germany)."

== Empire of Japan ==
Totalitarianism has been one of the suggested descriptions for the one-party system that ruled the Empire of Japan during World War II. S. J. Lee believes that the ideological base "was traditional", as opposed to "revolutionary" ideologies required by the Western theories of totalitarianism, "even if the methods of communication and control were modern and European", and that the traditional society of Japan was "to a large degree differential", while its institutions remained too elitist and conservative to follow such practices as a "democratic mass mobilization" characteristic of totalitarianism, so he defines this system as authoritarian as opposed to totalitarian.

Michael Lucken calls Japan "the highly peculiar form of totalitarianism". According to Lucken, "scholars today are hesitant to describe the regime as totalitarian" and "only a handful of scholars specializing in Japan continue somewhat disparately to use the term, while others reject it entirely". He connects it to the policies of the United States during the occupation of Japan after World War II. While the American authorities labelled Germany "totalitarian" and thus authorizing the term, they never officially did it to Japan since this would make Hirohito responsible for the war and war crimes, which contradicted the plans of Douglas MacArthur; Arendt further contributed to the exclusion of Japan from the list of totalitarian regimes by formulating the mainstream criterion of totalitarianism unapplicable to Japan. As her theories gained less influence, the Japanese historians find the term applicable, which creates a discrepancy between Japanese and Western historiographies. According to Lucken, "The concept of totality in Japanese wartime thinking did not refer to an enclosed whole, like a set of marbles in a bag. On the contrary, it was an open and organic whole that resists any narrow definition. Consequently, if we are able to speak of Japanese totalitarianism, it was all the more total for having consistently resisted such a label."

== Marxism-Leninism outside the Soviet Union ==
According to Steven Saxonberg, "all Marxist-Leninist regimes have totalitarian ambitions", even though they do not always succeed in consolidation of their power and establishment of totalitarianism. While the Soviet Union is profoundly examined as non-totalitarian by the critics of the concept of totalitarianism, in regard to other "communist states" the label was applied only by those who support these theories, so application of the label to them featured less profound debates.

The following Marxist-Leninist dictatorships have been defined as totalitarian without debates in academia: Maoist regime in China led by Mao Zedong, the rule of Enver Hoxha in the People's Socialist Republic of Albania, the Neo-Stalinist Democratic Republic of Afghanistan which was supported by the USSR in the Soviet-Afghan War, the Somali Democratic Republic under Siad Barre, Democratic Kampuchea under Pol Pot, and the regimes of Mengistu Haile Mariam in Ethiopia, who emerged as the leader of the communist military junta known as the Derg and its Commission for Organizing the Party of the Working People of Ethiopia and later founded the People's Democratic Republic of Ethiopia and Workers' Party of Ethiopia as its totalitarian party. The latter is listed by Steven Saxonberg as an example of "failed of totalitarianism" due to its inability to consolidate control all over the country and the defeat in the civil war. The other two regimes he lists in the same category are the Sandinist Junta of National Reconstruction in Nicaragua and the People's Revolutionary Government of Grenada which was destroyed by the U. S. invasion following a factional split within the government.

There has also been a consensus that North Korea under Kim Il Sung and his son Kim Jong Il, which was founded as a Stalinist regime in 1948, provides an example of totalitarianism. However, it is more contentious as to when to mark the beginning of totalitarian period and whether it has ended. Thus, it was suggested that North Korea moved from Stalinism to true totalitarianism only in 1967, with the establishment of the Ten Principles for the Establishment of a Monolithic Ideological System. It has also been suggested that the beginning of Songun politics under Kim Jong Il in 1994 marked the transition of North Korea to post-totalitarianism: while it did not lead to the regime achieving more political or social pluralism, it transformed the party-dominant totalitarian system to a one where the party competes with the army.

Similarly, Fidel Castro, known for arrests of both his opponents and supporters and suppressing alternative communist movements, is regarded as a totalitarian dictator, but the chronological boundaries of totalitarianism in Cuba are less clear. Professor Paul C. Sondrol described Castro as a "totalitarian dictator", and suggested that in leading "a political system largely [of] his own creation and bearing his indelible stamp", Castro's leadership style warranted comparisons with totalitarian leaders like Mao Zedong, Joseph Stalin, Adolf Hitler, and Benito Mussolini. It has been suggested that 1961, when Castro declared the country to be Marxist-Leninist and began political persecution of the dissidents, marks the beginning of the totalitarian period. There have been more varied suggestions regarding the distinguishing the post-totalitarian period from the preceding one: among the suggested dates were 1968, "when Che Guevara's death and an economic crisis led Castro to largely abandon his dreams ofexporting his revolution to Latin America, and any notion of establishing an alternative Leninist model to the Soviet one," and between 1971 and 1985.

European satellites of the USSR which were established and became a part of the Warsaw Pact organization after World War II may also be regarded as totalitarian during their Stalinist phases. Thus, Czechoslovakia becomes totalitarian from 1948, when the Stalinist coup d'état overthrew the republican government, and the Prague Spring of 1968; Stalinist Hungarian People's Republic under Mátyás Rákosi from 1949 to 1953 is widely regarded as totalitarian, the same label is used to the People's Republic of Bulgaria. However, according to the Czech political scientist Michal Kubát, who relies on the mainstream theories of Juan Linz, these countries along with East Germany were only quasi-totalitarian. Kubát distinguishes these regimes from the Polish People's Republic, which he describes as authoritarian and similar to Titoist Yugoslavia; similarly, Saxonberg describes Poland as not totalitarian, noting that it made significant concessions to the civil society. Yugoslavia has also been described as totalitarian by some authors, but the applicability of the label has been contested.

The Mongolian People's Republic, the only "communist state" other than the USSR established prior to the Cold War, has also been described as totalitarian.

== Ba'athism in Iraq and Syria ==
Ba'athism, the ideology of the Ba'ath Party and its Iraqi and Syrian branches, was the ruling ideology of the regimes known as Ba'athist Iraq and Ba'athist Syria. The Palgrave Handbook of Kurdish Genocides describes Ba'athism both in Iraq and Syria as a totalitarian ideology; Miaad A. Hassan writes that "it can be argued that, while the Ba'ath is a totalitarian ideology, it is instrumentally rather than inspirationally autocratic."

=== Ba'athist Iraq ===
Academics such as Kevin Woods and others have described Ba'athist Iraq as a repressive totalitarian state. Saddam's regime was notorious for its repressive tactics. These included widespread surveillance, torture, and extrajudicial killings. Numerous cases of human rights abuses committed by his government were documented by human rights organizations. Saddam's regime suppressed political opposition through a combination of violence, intimidation, and censorship. Freedom of speech and freedom of the press were severely curtailed, and political opponents were often executed or imprisoned. He initiated three military conflicts, including the Iran–Iraq War, the Iraqi invasion of Kuwait, and the Gulf War. These actions led to heavy casualties and widespread regional instability. Saddamism has been described by critics as a mix of "Sunni Arab nationalism, confused Stalinism, and fascist zeal for the fatherland and its leader". Although Saddam is often described as a totalitarian leader, Joseph Sassoon notes that there are important differences between Saddam's repression and the totalitarianism practiced by Adolf Hitler and Joseph Stalin, particularly with regard to freedom of movement and freedom of religion.

=== Ba'athist Syria ===
A large number of scholars have also described Ba'athist Syria, especially under the rule of the Assad family, as a totalitarian regime. The Oxford Handbook of Propaganda Studies (2013) described the Assad regime as a totalitarian police state which rigidly and pervasively dominated all aspects of the civil society, while engaging in deadly acts of repression. The Ba'athist regime held state ownership of the mass media infrastructure in Syria and tightly controlled the flow of information within the country, while banning independent journalism, censoring the internet, and controlling the publication and distribution of books. Several academics have described the military, bureaucratic, and secret police apparatus of the Ba'athist Syrian state as constituting an Orwellian socio-political apparatus that was designed to eliminate independent civic activities from its very onset.

The Ba'ath party was also deeply embedded within educational institutions across Syria. The regime utilized schools, universities, factories, and religious institutions to enforce Assadist ideology and indoctrinate citizens. According to Syrian artist Lina Ghaibeh, through its centralized control of information flows and the ritualization of Ba'athist practices in public institutions, the Assad regime's totalitarian control extended beyond societal regimentation to the shaping of individual identity, collective memory, and perceptions of social reality.

== Islamic fundamentalism ==
Since the 9/11 attacks and the beginning of the War on Terror, various radical movements adhering to the concept of an Islamic state, seeking to implement such a state through armed struggle, declaring opposition to the West and described with such labels Islamism, Islamic fundamentalism, jihadism and Islamic terrorism, have been described as totalitarian movements in the Western press and academia, and the governments established by them were also described as totalitarian.

For example, the political scientist Bassam Tibi cites Hannah Arendt to describe "Jihadist Islamism" as a variety of totalitarianism, writing that it combines "combines 'Medieval theology and modern politics' in a totalitarian manner" and thus "gives the Islamic worldview a new shape through an invented tradition that 'religionises' politics"; according to him, Islamism "deni[es] the separation between the private and the public spheres" in favour of subordinating "society to a comprehensive state apparatus designed along shari'a-based rules", "leaves no space for pluralism and diversity" due to seeking to eradicate everything "un-Islamic", strictly controls the individual behaviours of citizens under its rule; according to Tibi, the "disregard for facts, its strict adherence to the rules of a fictitious world" characteristic of totalitarianism according to Arendt are also present in Islamism.

While the usage of the concept of totalitarianism towards Islamism became wide, ther have been some critiques of it, although not mainstream: Enzo Traverso, who refutes the Western theories of totalitarism in general, writes that the Western concept revolves around the desire of communism and fascism to rebuild society in accordance with the concept of the "New Man" and as a result set their projects toward the future, unlike Islamism which seeks to revive the old forms of absolutism. Here Traverso cites Tzvetan Todorov: "The reactionary modernism of Islamic terrorism, on the contrary, employs modern technologies in order to return to the original purity of a mythical Islam. If it has utopian tendencies, they look to the past rather than the future."

While Afghanistan is often described as totalitarian, this label is not widely applied to Gaza under Hamas. According to Sherifa Zuhur, Hamas seeks "a truly moral (but not totalitarian) Islamic society"; Björn Brenner in a study of Gaza under Hamas acknowledges that while there are authors very critical of Islamism insisting on its totalitarian theocratic nature and applying their understanding towards Gaza, terms the Hamas governance as authoritarian, "mid-way between" a theocracy and a democracy, noting that the ideology of Hamas by the moment they came to power through elections combined "Islamic ideals with democratic principles."

The Islamic State held significant territory in Iraq and Syria during the course of the Third Iraq War and the Syrian civil war from 2013 to 2019 under the dictatorship of its first Caliph, Abu Bakr al-Baghdadi, who imposed a strict interpretation of Sharia law. Which has been described as a totalitarian regime as the group espouses a totalitarian ideology that is a fundamentalist hybrid of Global Jihadism, Wahhabism, and Qutbism. Following its territorial expansion in 2014, the group renamed itself as the "Islamic State" and declared itself as a caliphate (Note: Caliphate claim of "Islamic State" group is disputed and declared as illegal by traditional Islamic scholarship.) that sought domination over the Muslim world.
