= Great Leader =

Great Leader may refer to:

== People's Republic of China ==
- Great leader, one of four 'great' titles given to Mao Zedong

== North Korean concept and leaders ==
- Great Leader (concept), the "Great Leader" concept/theory forms the basis on how North Korea is to be ruled
  - Kim Il Sung, known officially as (The Great Leader) in North Korea
  - Kim Jong Il, Kim Il Sung's son
  - Kim Jong Un, Kim Jong Il's son and Kim Il Sung's grandson

== Other people ==
- Mustafa Kemal Atatürk, the Great Leader (Ulu Önder) of the Republic of Turkey
- Mammad Amin Rasulzade, the Great Leader (Ulu Öndər) of the Republic of Azerbaijan
- Muhammad Ali Jinnah, founder and Governor-General of Pakistan, known as the Great Leader (Quaid-i-Azam) of Pakistan

== Arts, entertainment, and media ==
- Great Leader, the primary villain in the Kamen Rider series
- The Great Leader, a novel by Jim Harrison

== See also ==
- Paramount leader
- Supreme Leader (disambiguation)
