= Supreme Leader =

A supreme leader or supreme ruler is a powerful figure with an unchallenged authority.

Supreme Leader or Supreme Ruler may also refer to:

== Politics ==
- Apu Mallku, Supreme Leader title of the Aymara people
- Cihuacoatl (position), a supreme leader in the Aztec Empire
- Paramount leader, the supreme leader of the People's Republic of China
- Supreme Leader of Communist Albania, title for the important political figure of Albania between 1944 and 1990
- Supreme Leader of Afghanistan, first held by Mullah Omar from 1996 to 2001; also used in exile during the Taliban insurgency
- Supreme Leader of Democratic Kampuchea, de facto leader of Democratic Kampuchea
- Supreme Leader of Iran (rahbar), the highest-ranking political and religious authority in the constitution of the Islamic Republic of Iran
- Supreme Leader (North Korean title), an honorary title given to the incumbent General Secretary of the Workers' Party of Korea and President of the State Affairs Commission, the highest-ranking position of ruling party and government
- Supreme Ruler of Russia, head of state and supreme commander-in-chief of the Russian State, established by the White Movement during the Russian Civil War

== Fiction ==
- Supreme Leader Snoke, a character from the Star Wars franchise
- Kylo Ren, a character from the Star Wars franchise
- Supreme Ruler (video game)
- El jefe máximo (The Supreme Leader), 1940 Mexican film

== See also ==
- Great Leader
- Maximum Leader
- Brotherly Leader
- General Secretary of the Communist Party
- Generalissimo (disambiguation)
