= Paramount leader =

Most important political figure in China

Paramount Leader
- 最高领导人
- Emblems of the CCP and PRC

- Flags of the CCP and PRC

- In role Xi Jinping since 15 November 2012
- Type: De facto leader
- Status: Informal term for the most important political figure of the People's Republic of China (Note: The paramount leader is not a formal position nor an office unto itself.)
- Inaugural holder: Mao Zedong
- Formation: 1 October 1949; 77 years ago
- Unofficial names: Paramount Communist Party leader Supreme Leader; Top Leader

Supreme leader
- Simplified Chinese: 最高领导人
- Traditional Chinese: 最高領導人
Transcriptions
Standard Mandarin
- Hanyu Pinyin: Zuìgāo Lǐngdǎorén

Paramount leader (Chinese: 最高领导人; pinyin: Zuìgāo Lǐngdǎorén) is an informal term for the most important political figure of the People's Republic of China (PRC). The paramount leader typically controls the Chinese Communist Party (CCP) and the People's Liberation Army (PLA), often holding the titles of CCP General Secretary and Chairman of the Central Military Commission (CMC). The state representative (president) or head of government (premier) are not necessarily paramount leader; under China's party-state system, CCP roles are politically more important than state titles.

The current paramount leader is Xi Jinping, who is considered to have taken on the role in November 2012 since assuming the position of CCP general secretary, rather than in March 2013 when he succeeded Hu Jintao as president.

The paramount leader is not a formal position nor an office unto itself. The term gained prominence during the era of Deng Xiaoping (1978–1989), when he was de facto able to wield political power without holding any official or formally significant party or government positions at any given time (state representative, head of government or leader of the CCP), but the Chairman of the CCP Central Military Commission (1981–1989). As the leader of the world's largest economy by GDP purchasing power parity (PPP), the second-largest economy by nominal GDP, and a potential superpower, the paramount leader is considered to be one of the world's most powerful political figures.

There has been significant overlap between paramount leader status and leadership core status, with a majority but not all of paramount leaders being also leadership cores, though they are separate concepts. The term has been used less frequently to describe Deng's successors, Jiang Zemin, Hu Jintao and Xi Jinping, who have all formally held the offices of General Secretary of the Chinese Communist Party (party leader), President of China (state representative) and Chairman of the Central Military Commission (commander-in-chief). Jiang, Hu and Xi are therefore usually referred to as president in the international scene, the title used by most other republican heads of state. However, Deng's successors derive their real power from the post of general secretary, which is the primary position in the Chinese power structure and generally regarded by scholars as the post whose holder can be considered paramount leader. The presidency is a largely ceremonial office according to the Constitution, (Note: The prestigious office of president, first held by Mao Zedong and then officially translated into English as "chairman", was abolished during the Cultural Revolution. The Constitution of 1982 restored powers and functions of the President of China as state representative, and specified that the official translation was "president", even though the Chinese name for the office, 主席; Zhǔxí, is unchanged and means "chairman" in other contexts, contrasted with 总统; 總統; Zǒngtǒng for the presidents of republics and other countries. This office does not have executive authority comparable to the President of the United States since most of its powers are ceremonial. The President of China can therefore be compared with the President of Germany and contrasted with the President of India, who theoretically possesses great executive power exercised in practice by the Union Council of Ministers.) and the most powerful position in the Chinese political system is the CCP general secretary. The general secretary has been the highest-ranking official in China's political system since 1982. (Note: The de facto leader Deng Xiaoping was 3rd ranking official in the 12th Politburo Standing Committee, and 2nd ranking official in the 13th Central Committee, after General Secretary Zhao Ziyang, but before President Yang Shangkun and Premier Li Peng. Deng at the time served as Chairman of the Central Military Commission and was ranked third or second overall in the leadership hierarchy.) Since Mao every paramount leader developed his own philosophy.

== History ==
Chairman Mao Zedong was the undisputed ruler of Communist China from its beginning in 1949 and held three chairman offices at once: Chairman of the Central Committee of the Chinese Communist Party, Chairman of the Central Military Commission and Chairman of the People's Republic of China (1954–59), making him the leader of the party, military and state, respectively. Following the Cultural Revolution, a rough consensus emerged within the party, that the worst excesses were caused by lack of checks and balances in the exercise of political power and the resulting "rule of personality" by Mao.

Beginning in the 1980s, the CCP leadership desired to prevent a single leader from rising above the party, as Mao had done. Accordingly, the post of CCP Chairman was abolished in 1982. Most of its functions were transferred to the revived post of General Secretary. The leadership experimented with a quasi-separation of powers, whereby the offices of general secretary, president and premier were held by different people. In 1985, for example, the CCP General Secretary was Hu Yaobang, the Chinese President was Li Xiannian and the Chinese Premier was Zhao Ziyang. However, Deng Xiaoping was still recognized as the core of the leadership. Both Hu and Zhao fell out of favour in the late 1980s, but Deng was able to retain ultimate political control.

In a discussion with Central Committee members in the lead-up 4th Plenum of the Thirteenth Central Committee (23 June-24 1989), Deng Xiaoping introduced the concept of the "Core Leader". In his analysis, despite the existence of figures like Chen Duxiu, Qu Qiubai, Xiang Zhongfa, Li Lisan, and Wang Ming, the Party did not have a proper "Core Leader" until the ascent of Mao Zedong at the Zunyi Conference of 1935. Mao's election ushered in the "First Generation" of CCP leadership. As for the second generation, Deng conceded that in retrospect, he had himself been the "Core", but that he had been constantly planning for the transition to a third generation. For this purpose, he encouraged his audience to rally around Jiang Zemin as the core of the "Third Generation". Despite Deng not formally relinquishing the position of Chairman of the Central Military Commission until the 5th Plenum (6 November-9 1989), official histories published by the CCP regard this endorsement, at the 4th Plenum, as the transition from the Deng administration to the Jiang administration.

The paramount leader label has been applied to Deng's successors, Jiang Zemin and Hu Jintao, though it is generally recognized that they did not wield as much power as Deng despite their having held more offices of leadership. There has been a greater emphasis on collective leadership, whereby the top leader is a first among equals style figure, exercising power with the consensus of the CCP Politburo Standing Committee. This was particularly apparent during the tenure of Hu Jintao. (Note: In official pronouncements when describing the existing leadership of the party, state media referred to the party under Hu as the "party center with comrade Hu Jintao as General Secretary" in contrast to the party under Jiang being described as the "party center with comrade Jiang Zemin as its core (核心)". Some analysts saw this change as a signal that collective leadership was being embraced over personal leadership.) Beginning in 1993, Jiang formally held the three offices that made him the head of the party, state, and military:

- General Secretary of the Chinese Communist Party: the party leader and the primary position of the state.
- Chairman of the Central Military Commission: Supreme Military Command of the People's Liberation Army.
- President of the People's Republic of China: the largely ceremonial state representative under the 1982 Constitution.

The system of holding the three posts simultaneously has officially been referred to as the "three-in-one" leadership system (“三位一体”领导体制; “Sān wèi yī tǐ” lǐng dǎo tǐ zhì). When Jiang left the offices of General Secretary and President in 2002 and 2003, respectively, he held onto the position of Chairman of the Central Military Commission. Military power had always been an important facet in the exercise of political power in Communist-ruled China and as such holding the top military post meant Jiang retained some formal power. When Jiang stepped down from his formal posts between 2002 and 2004, it was ambiguous who the paramount leader was. Hu Jintao held the same trio of positions during his years in power. Hu transferred all three positions onto his successor Xi Jinping between November 2012, when Xi became CCP General Secretary and Chairman of the Central Military Commission; and March 2013, when Xi became president. Since Xi's ascendance to power, two new bodies, the National Security Commission and Central Comprehensively Deepening Reforms Commission, have been established, ostensibly concentrating political power in the paramount leader to a greater degree than anyone since Deng. These bodies were tasked with establishing the general policy direction for national security, as well as economic reform. Both groups are headed by the General Secretary.

== List of paramount leaders ==
Bold offices refer to the highest position in the Chinese Communist Party.

| Picture | Name | Period | Ideology (Generation) | CCP leaders | Presidents | Premiers | Offices held | |
|---|---|---|---|---|---|---|---|---|
| | Mao Zedong 毛泽东 (1893–1976) | 1 October 1949 ↓ 9 September 1976 (26 years, 344 days) (died in office) | Mao Zedong Thought (First) | Himself | Himself; Liu Shaoqi; Post abolished | Zhou Enlai; Hua Guofeng | Chairman of the CCP Central Politburo | 20 March 1943 – 28 September 1956 |
| | Mao Zedong 毛泽东 (1893–1976) | 1 October 1949 ↓ 9 September 1976 (26 years, 344 days) (died in office) | Mao Zedong Thought (First) | Himself | Himself; Liu Shaoqi; Post abolished | Zhou Enlai; Hua Guofeng | Chairman of the CCP Central Secretariat | 20 March 1943 – 28 September 1956 |
| | Mao Zedong 毛泽东 (1893–1976) | 1 October 1949 ↓ 9 September 1976 (26 years, 344 days) (died in office) | Mao Zedong Thought (First) | Himself | Himself; Liu Shaoqi; Post abolished | Zhou Enlai; Hua Guofeng | Chairman of the CCP Central Committee | 19 June 1945 – 9 September 1976 |
| | Mao Zedong 毛泽东 (1893–1976) | 1 October 1949 ↓ 9 September 1976 (26 years, 344 days) (died in office) | Mao Zedong Thought (First) | Himself | Himself; Liu Shaoqi; Post abolished | Zhou Enlai; Hua Guofeng | Chairman of the PRC Central People's Government | 1 October 1949 – 27 September 1954 |
| | Mao Zedong 毛泽东 (1893–1976) | 1 October 1949 ↓ 9 September 1976 (26 years, 344 days) (died in office) | Mao Zedong Thought (First) | Himself | Himself; Liu Shaoqi; Post abolished | Zhou Enlai; Hua Guofeng | Chairman of the CPPCC National Committee | 9 October 1949 – 25 December 1954 |
| | Mao Zedong 毛泽东 (1893–1976) | 1 October 1949 ↓ 9 September 1976 (26 years, 344 days) (died in office) | Mao Zedong Thought (First) | Himself | Himself; Liu Shaoqi; Post abolished | Zhou Enlai; Hua Guofeng | Chairman of the CCP Central Military Commission | 8 September 1954 – 9 September 1976 |
| | Mao Zedong 毛泽东 (1893–1976) | 1 October 1949 ↓ 9 September 1976 (26 years, 344 days) (died in office) | Mao Zedong Thought (First) | Himself | Himself; Liu Shaoqi; Post abolished | Zhou Enlai; Hua Guofeng | Chairman of the PRC | 27 September 1954 – 27 April 1959 |
| | Hua Guofeng 华国锋 (1921–2008) | 9 September 1976 ↓ 22 December 1978 (2 years, 104 days) (Note: Some sources mentions that Hua Guofeng was removed from power in 1980 or 1981, however December 1978 is the accepted date.) (resigned) | Two Whatevers (First) | Himself | Post abolished | Himself | Premier of the PRC State Council | 4 February 1976 – 10 September 1980 |
| | Hua Guofeng 华国锋 (1921–2008) | 9 September 1976 ↓ 22 December 1978 (2 years, 104 days) (resigned) | Two Whatevers (First) | Himself | Post abolished | Himself | First Vice Chairman of the CCP Central Committee | 7 April 1976 – 7 October 1976 |
| | Hua Guofeng 华国锋 (1921–2008) | 9 September 1976 ↓ 22 December 1978 (2 years, 104 days) (resigned) | Two Whatevers (First) | Himself | Post abolished | Himself | Chairman of the CCP Central Committee | 7 October 1976 – 28 June 1981 |
| | Hua Guofeng 华国锋 (1921–2008) | 9 September 1976 ↓ 22 December 1978 (2 years, 104 days) (resigned) | Two Whatevers (First) | Himself | Post abolished | Himself | Chairman of the CCP Central Military Commission | 7 October 1976 – 28 June 1981 |
| | Deng Xiaoping 邓小平 (1904–1997) | 22 December 1978 ↓ 24 June 1989 (10 years, 184 days) (Note: The New York Times had the view that Deng Xiaoping was the paramount leader until 1993, however 1989 is the accepted date of his end of leadership.) (retired) | Deng Xiaoping Theory (Second) | Hua Guofeng; Hu Yaobang; Zhao Ziyang | Post abolished Li Xiannian; Yang Shangkun | Hua Guofeng; Zhao Ziyang; Li Peng | First Vice Premier of the PRC State Council | 17 January 1975 – 18 June 1983 |
| | Deng Xiaoping 邓小平 (1904–1997) | 22 December 1978 ↓ 24 June 1989 (10 years, 184 days) (retired) | Deng Xiaoping Theory (Second) | Hua Guofeng; Hu Yaobang; Zhao Ziyang | Post abolished Li Xiannian; Yang Shangkun | Hua Guofeng; Zhao Ziyang; Li Peng | Chairman of the CPPCC National Committee | 8 March 1978 – 17 June 1983 |
| | Deng Xiaoping 邓小平 (1904–1997) | 22 December 1978 ↓ 24 June 1989 (10 years, 184 days) (retired) | Deng Xiaoping Theory (Second) | Hua Guofeng; Hu Yaobang; Zhao Ziyang | Post abolished Li Xiannian; Yang Shangkun | Hua Guofeng; Zhao Ziyang; Li Peng | Chairman of the CCP Central Military Commission | 28 June 1981 – 9 November 1989 |
| | Deng Xiaoping 邓小平 (1904–1997) | 22 December 1978 ↓ 24 June 1989 (10 years, 184 days) (retired) | Deng Xiaoping Theory (Second) | Hua Guofeng; Hu Yaobang; Zhao Ziyang | Post abolished Li Xiannian; Yang Shangkun | Hua Guofeng; Zhao Ziyang; Li Peng | Chairman of the CCP Central Advisory Commission | 13 September 1982 – 2 November 1987 |
| | Deng Xiaoping 邓小平 (1904–1997) | 22 December 1978 ↓ 24 June 1989 (10 years, 184 days) (retired) | Deng Xiaoping Theory (Second) | Hua Guofeng; Hu Yaobang; Zhao Ziyang | Post abolished Li Xiannian; Yang Shangkun | Hua Guofeng; Zhao Ziyang; Li Peng | Chairman of the PRC Central Military Commission | 6 June 1983 – 19 March 1990 |
| | Jiang Zemin 江泽民 (1926–2022) | 24 June 1989 ↓ 15 November 2002 (13 years, 144 days) (retired) | Three Represents (Third) | Himself | Yang Shangkun; Himself | Li Peng; Zhu Rongji | General Secretary of the CCP Central Committee | 24 June 1989 – 15 November 2002 |
| | Jiang Zemin 江泽民 (1926–2022) | 24 June 1989 ↓ 15 November 2002 (13 years, 144 days) (retired) | Three Represents (Third) | Himself | Yang Shangkun; Himself | Li Peng; Zhu Rongji | Chairman of the CCP Central Military Commission | 9 November 1989 – 19 September 2004 |
| | Jiang Zemin 江泽民 (1926–2022) | 24 June 1989 ↓ 15 November 2002 (13 years, 144 days) (retired) | Three Represents (Third) | Himself | Yang Shangkun; Himself | Li Peng; Zhu Rongji | Chairman of the PRC Central Military Commission | 19 March 1990 – 13 March 2005 |
| | Jiang Zemin 江泽民 (1926–2022) | 24 June 1989 ↓ 15 November 2002 (13 years, 144 days) (retired) | Three Represents (Third) | Himself | Yang Shangkun; Himself | Li Peng; Zhu Rongji | President of the PRC | 27 March 1993 – 15 March 2003 |
| | Hu Jintao 胡锦涛 (born 1942) | 15 November 2002 ↓ 15 November 2012 (10 years) (retired) | Scientific Outlook on Development (Fourth) | Himself | | Wen Jiabao | General Secretary of the CCP Central Committee | 15 November 2002 – 15 November 2012 |
| | Hu Jintao 胡锦涛 (born 1942) | 15 November 2002 ↓ 15 November 2012 (10 years) (retired) | Scientific Outlook on Development (Fourth) | Himself | | Wen Jiabao | President of the PRC | 15 March 2003 – 14 March 2013 |
| | Hu Jintao 胡锦涛 (born 1942) | 15 November 2002 ↓ 15 November 2012 (10 years) (retired) | Scientific Outlook on Development (Fourth) | Himself | | Wen Jiabao | Chairman of the CCP Central Military Commission | 19 September 2004 – 15 November 2012 |
| | Hu Jintao 胡锦涛 (born 1942) | 15 November 2002 ↓ 15 November 2012 (10 years) (retired) | Scientific Outlook on Development (Fourth) | Himself | | Wen Jiabao | Chairman of the PRC Central Military Commission | 13 March 2005 – 14 March 2013 |
| | Xi Jinping 习近平 (born 1953) | 15 November 2012 ↓ Incumbent (14 years, 4 days) | Xi Jinping Thought (Fifth) | Himself | | Li Keqiang; Li Qiang | General Secretary of the CCP Central Committee | 15 November 2012 – Incumbent |
| | Xi Jinping 习近平 (born 1953) | 15 November 2012 ↓ Incumbent (14 years, 4 days) | Xi Jinping Thought (Fifth) | Himself | | Li Keqiang; Li Qiang | Chairman of the CCP Central Military Commission | 15 November 2012 – Incumbent |
| | Xi Jinping 习近平 (born 1953) | 15 November 2012 ↓ Incumbent (14 years, 4 days) | Xi Jinping Thought (Fifth) | Himself | | Li Keqiang; Li Qiang | President of the PRC | 14 March 2013 – Incumbent |
| | Xi Jinping 习近平 (born 1953) | 15 November 2012 ↓ Incumbent (14 years, 4 days) | Xi Jinping Thought (Fifth) | Himself | | Li Keqiang; Li Qiang | Chairman of the PRC Central Military Commission | 14 March 2013 – Incumbent |

== See also ==
- List of Chinese leaders
- Leader of the Chinese Communist Party
- Order of precedence in China
- Supreme Leader
- Great Leader
- Primus inter pares
- First Lady of China
- List of de facto leaders of the People's Republic of Kampuchea
- List of de facto leaders of the Mongolian People's Republic
- De facto leader of the GDR
