= List of cars with non-standard door designs =

Many cars use car door designs other than the standard design, which is hinged at the front edge of the door, and swings away from the car horizontally and towards the front of the car. The main types of non-standard door designs are:

- Butterfly – butterfly doors move via hinges along the A-pillar, on an axis not aligned vertically or horizontally to the vehicle or ground. A special type of butterfly door is a single door at the front of the car with the steering wheel attached.
- Canopy – roof, windshield, and sides are one unit that moves upward, forward, or sideways to provide access.
- Gullwing – (also called "falcon-wing") hinged to the roof at the top horizontal edge of the door, and open upward on a horizontal axis. Gullwing doors with a second hinge between door and moving roof panel are called falcon wing doors.
- Scissors – rotate vertically at a fixed hinge at the front of the door, and open by rotating on a horizontal axis, perpendicular to the vehicle's length. Scissor doors that also move outward while rotating are called dihedral synchro-helix actuation doors.
- Sliding – mounted to or suspended from a track, and open by sliding horizontally alongside or into the vehicle sidewall, or open by sliding vertically into the vehicle sidewall or floor. Sliding doors that disappear into the floor horizontally are called rolling doors.
- Suicide – hinged on the rear end of the door-frame, and open horizontally towards the rear.
- Swan – opens outward like either a conventional door or a suicide door, but on an axis slightly tilted from vertical, or via articulation in the hinge to angle upward for better ground clearance

Some custom limousines have enlarged doors.

== Scissor doors ==
Scissor doors open on a Lamborghini Murciélago

=== Road-legal cars ===
- Albar Sonic
- Arrinera Hussarya
- ASL Garaiya
- Bertone GB110
- Bugatti EB110
- Covini C6W
- Giotti Victoria Ginko
- Gumpert Nathalie
- HTT Pléthore LC 750
- IFR Aspid
- Jimenez Novia (doors include part of the roof)
- Kepler Motion
- Lamborghini Aventador (doors open up and outward at a slight angle)
- Lamborghini Aventador J
- Lamborghini Centenario
- Lamborghini Countach
- Lamborghini Diablo
- Lamborghini Murciélago
- Lamborghini Reventón
- Lamborghini Revuelto
- Lamborghini Veneno
- MG Cyberster
- Mitsuoka Orochi
- Montecarlo Rascasse (similar doors to the Lamborghini Aventador)
- MTX Tatra V8
- Orca 113
- Renault Twizy
- Spyker C8
- Spyker C12 Zagato
- Tata Pixel
- Techrules AT96
- Toroidion 1MW
- Tushek T700
- Vaydor
- Vector M12
- Vector W8
- Xpeng P7 (limited edition)

=== Racing cars ===
- Bugatti Bolide
- Spyker C8 Laviolette GT2R and Spyker C8 Spider GT2R

=== Concept cars ===
- Alfa Romeo Carabo
- Alfa Romeo Brera Concept
- Alfa Romeo Pandion – large suicide-scissor front doors
- Aston Martin AMV10
- Audi RS7 Concept
- Bertone Barchetta – large suicide-scissor front doors
- Bozca Zest
- Cadillac Cien
- Chery Ant
- Chevrolet Corvette CERV IlI
- Chevrolet Miray
- Chrysler Portofino – front scissor doors, with rear suicide scissor doors
- Citroën C-Métisse – front scissor doors, with rear scissor doors
- Citroën Survolt
- Citroën Zabrus
- Dodge ZEO concept (front scissor doors with suicide rear scissor doors)
- Dome Zero
- Ford Indigo – large suicide-scissor front doors
- Frazer Nash Namir
- Giugiaro Ford Mustang
- Isuzu Como Concept
- Jaguar XJ220 Concept
- Kia Kue
- KTM E3W
- Lada Revolution III
- Lamborghini Canto
- Land Rover Range Stormer
- Mazda Hakaze Concept
- Mercedes-Benz Aria Concept – large conventional-scissor front doors, with large suicide-scissor rear doors
- Peugeot Quartz
- Peugeot Quasar
- Peugeot Shine – front scissor doors, with rear scissor doors
- Pininfarina Sintesi – front scissor doors, with rear scissor doors
- Renault Alpine A110-50
- Renault Coupe Corbusier – large suicide-scissor front doors
- Renault Laguna Coupe Concept
- Renault Zoom
- Sbarro Challenge III
- Spyker Silvestris V8
- Toyota Alessandro Volta
- Toyota Bionic+ – large suicide-scissor front doors
- Toyota Concept-愛i – front scissor doors with rear suicide scissor doors
- Vector WX-3
- Volkswagen W12
- Zender Vision 3
- Zender Fact 4

== Butterfly doors ==
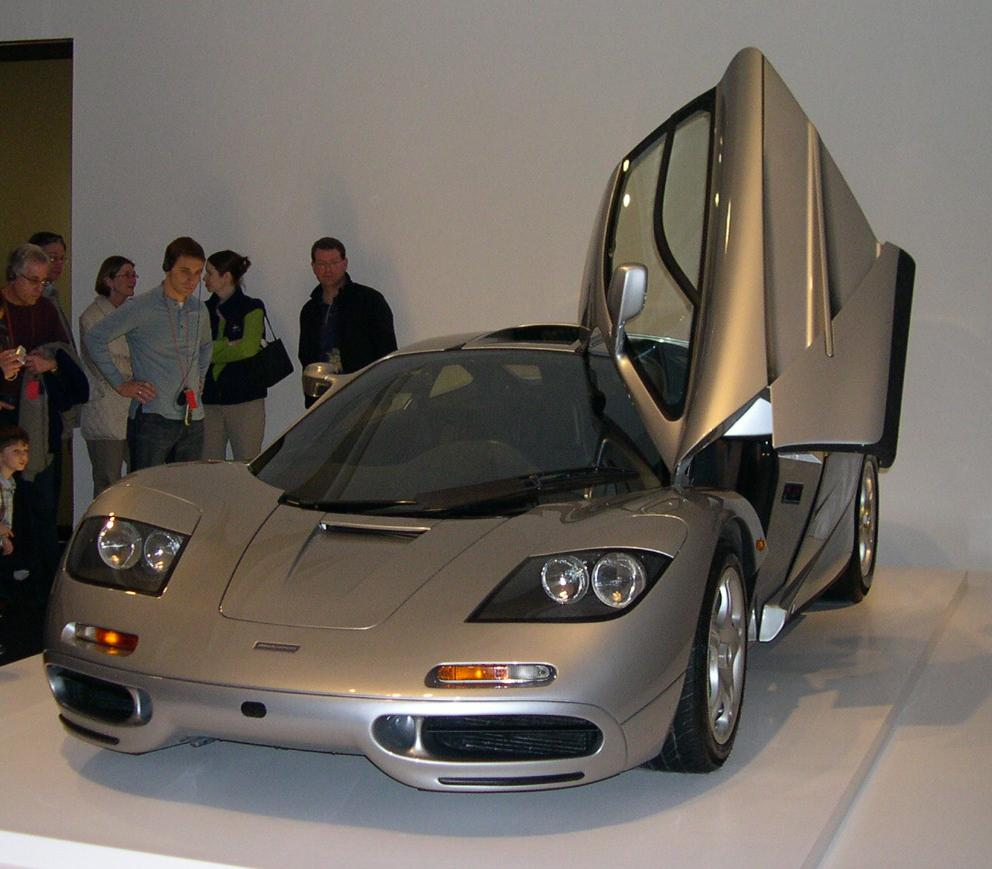
Butterfly doors open on a McLaren F1

=== Road-legal cars ===
- Alfa Romeo 33 Stradale
- Alfa Romeo 33 Stradale (2023)
- Aspark Owl
- BMW i8
- Bugatti Tourbillon
- Contera MD1
- De Tomaso P72
- Devon GTX
- Donkervoort D8 GT
- Felino CB7
- Ferrari Enzo
- Ferrari F80
- Ferrari Daytona SP3
- Ford GT (2nd generation)
- Giamaro Katla
- Gillet Vertigo
- Gordon Murray T.33
- Gordon Murray T.50
- GTA Spano (2nd generation only)
- Heinkel Kabine
- Hispano-Suiza Carmen
- Jaguar C-X75
- Joss JP1
- Isetta
- LaFerrari
- Laraki Fulgara
- Lotec Sirius
- Lotus Evija
- Manta Montage
- Marussia B1
- Maserati MC20
- McLaren 12C – Doors are not hinged at the roof, unlike most butterfly door designs.
- McLaren 12C Spider – similar doors to McLaren 12C
- McLaren Artura
- McLaren 570S
- McLaren 650S
- McLaren 720S
- McLaren Elva
- McLaren F1
- McLaren M6GT
- McLaren P1
- McLaren Senna
- McLaren Speedtail
- McLaren McL 6GT
- Mercedes-AMG ONE
- Mercedes-Benz CLK GTR Roadster
- Mercedes-Benz SLR McLaren
- Mosler MT900
- Oilstainlab HF-11
- Pagani Utopia
- Saleen S7
- Savage Rivale Roadyacht GTS – conventional-butterfly front doors, with suicide-butterfly rear doors
- SCG 004
- SIN R1
- SSC Aero
- SSC Tuatara
- SSC Ultimate Aero and SSC Ultimate Aero XT
- Stealth B6
- Toyota Sera
- Ultima Evolution
- Ultima GTR
- Ultima Mk2
- Ultima Mk3
- Ultima Sports
- Volkswagen XL1
- Wells Vertige
- Zenvo Aurora

=== Racing cars ===
A common door design on Group C, IMSA GTP cars of the 1980s and early 1990s and on any sports prototypes since then, this list does not include cars categorized as such.

- Alfa Romeo 33/2
- Alfa Romeo Tipo 33
- Bugatti Bolide
- Ferrari 330P3, Ferrari 330P4 and Ferrari 412P
- Ferrari 512 S
- Ferrari FXX and Ferrari FXX Evoluzione
- Ferrari FXX-K
- Lola T70 Mk3B
- Mercedes-Benz CLK GTR
- Porsche 911 GT1
- Renault Mégane R.S. Trophy

=== Concept cars ===
- Alfa Romeo Diva
- Audi Avus quattro
- Audi Nanuk – similar doors to the McLaren 12C, with panels extend from the top to the roof (similar to the Ford GT40)
- Bertone Mantide
- BMW i8 Concept
- BMW Vision EfficientDynamics – a concept electric car based on the production BMW i8 with butterfly doors
- Cadillac Urban Luxury Concept
- Citroën C-Métisse – front butterfly doors, with rear suicide scissor doors
- Citroën GT
- Citroën Karin
- Ferrari P4/5 by Pininfarina
- Ford Shelby GR-1
- Geely Tiger GT
- Great Wall Haval E
- HU-GO
- Hyundai HND-9
- Infiniti Concept Vision Gran Turismo
- Isuzu XU-1
- Italdesign Giugiaro Parcour
- Italdesign GTZERO –
- Kia Niro – similar to butterfly doors, with panels extend from the roof to the top (similar to the Ford GT40)
- Lotus M250
- Mazda Furai
- Mazda Kiyora
- Mazda RX-500 – butterfly front doors with gull-wing doors over the engine compartment
- Mazda Taiki
- McLaren SLR Stirling Moss
- Mercedes-Benz Vision SLR
- Renault Altica
- Renault Captur Concept
- Renault DeZir – conventional-butterfly door on driver's side, with suicide-butterfly door on passenger's side
- Renault Kwid concept
- Renault Zoe Z.E. – front butterfly doors, with rear butterfly doors
- Saab PhoeniX
- Sbarro GT1
- Sbarro Osmos
- SEAT Fórmula
- Scion Fuse
- Subaru VIZIV
- Stola Abarth Monotipo
- Toyota AXV-II
- Toyota Sportivo Coupe
- Venturi Volage
- Volkswagen Golf GTE Sport
- Volkswagen GTI Roadster Vision Gran Turismo
- Zender Vision 1S

== Gullwing doors ==
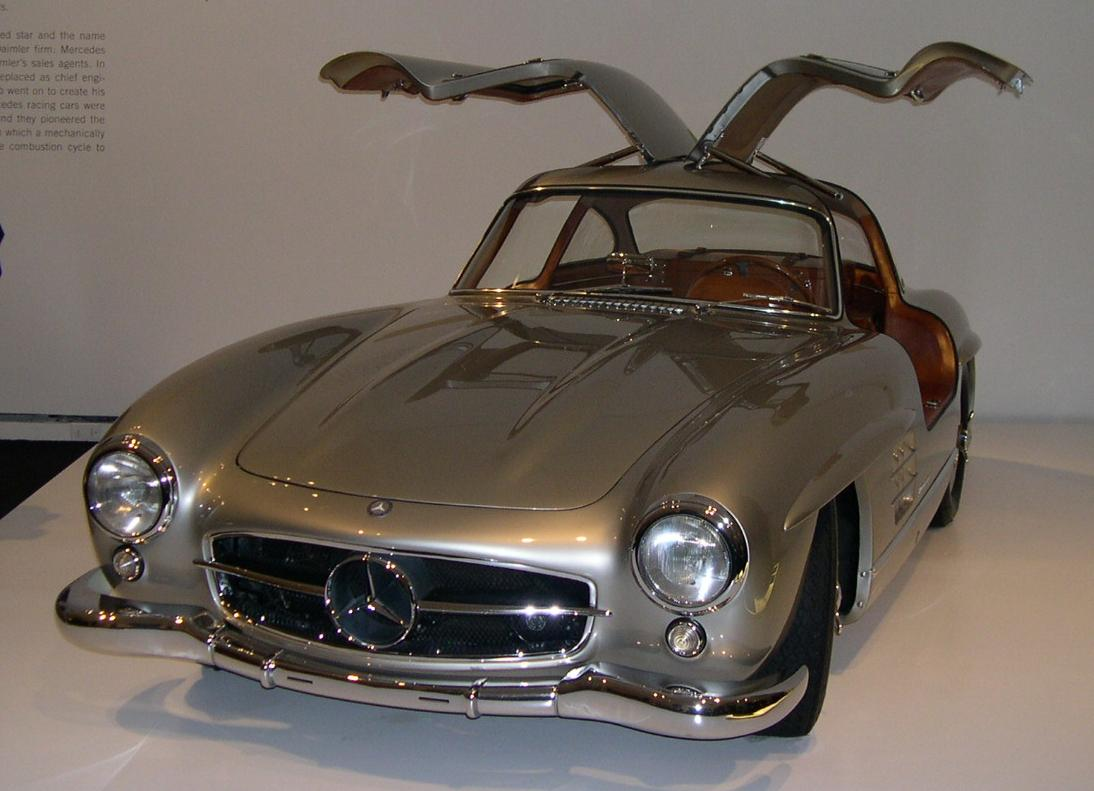
Gullwing doors open on a Mercedes-Benz 300SL

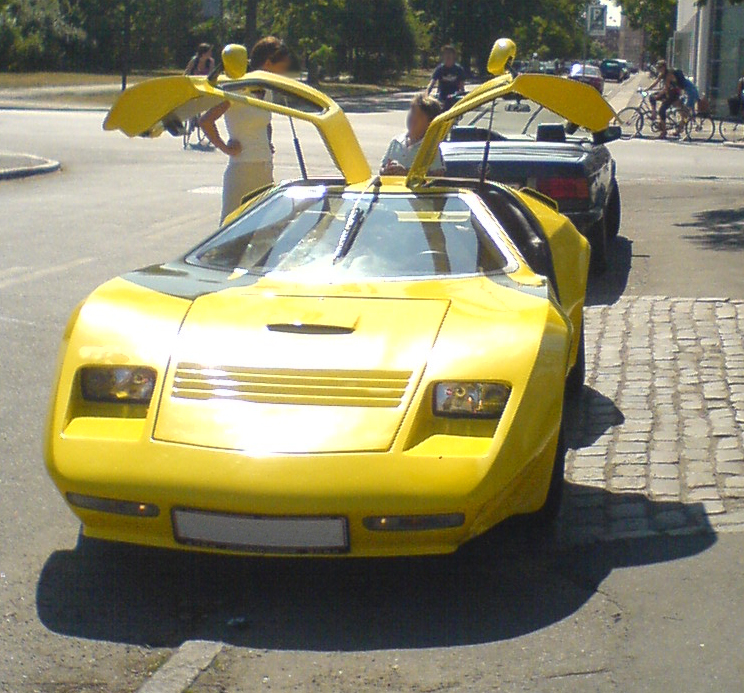
Gullwing doors open on an Eagle SS

=== Road-legal cars ===
- AMT Piranha
- Aston Martin Valkyrie (2018)
- Atla (automobile)
- Apollo IE
- Ares S1 Project
- Autozam AZ-1
- Bermat GT-Pista
- Bugatti Type 64
- Bradley GTII
- Bricklin SV-1
- Bristol Fighter
- Capricorn 01 Zagato
- Cimbria SS
- Dare DZ
- De Macross Epique GT1
- De Tomaso Mangusta (engine compartment)
- DMC DeLorean
- Drako Dragon
- Eagle SS
- Embeesea Charger
- Fiberfab Aztec 7
- Fiberfab Caribee/Banshee
- Fortvac Bernardi
- GP Talon
- Gumpert Apollo
- HiPhi X – conventional front doors, with a pair of rear suicide doors and a pair of gull wing doors
- Hofstetter Turbo
- Hyptec HT
- Innes Lee Scorpion K19
- Isdera Commendatore 112i
- Isdera Commendatore GT
- Isdera Imperator 108i
- Laser 917
- McLaren W1
- Melkus RS 1000
- Melkus RS 2000
- Mercedes-Benz 300SL
- Mercedes-Benz 300SLR Uhlenhaut Coupe
- Mercedes-Benz SLS AMG
- Mirov II
- Nilu27
- NSU Thurner RS
- Pagani Huayra
- Pambuffetti PJ-01
- Quant E
- Quant F
- Raffo Belva
- Replicar Cursor
- Rhino Racing RR01
- RPB GT
- Siva S160 Spyder
- Suzuki Cara
- Tesla Model X – conventional front doors, with rear falcon wing doors
- Voyah i-Land

=== Racing cars ===
- Arnott-Climax 1100 GT
- Bill Thomas Cheetah
- Chaparral 2D
- Chaparral 2F
- Daren Mk.1
- Healey SR
- Howmet TX
- Isuzu Bellett R6
- Lola T70 Mk3B
- Marcos Luton Gullwing
- Marcos Xylon GT
- Mercedes-Benz 300SLR
- Mercedes-Benz CLK LM
- Moynet LM 75
- Nimrod Aston Martin
- Nissan GT-R LM Nismo
- Opel Astra Xtreme – a racing car based on the Opel Astra with front gullwing doors
- Peugeot 905
- Porsche 906
- Nissan R380 II
- Toyota GT-One

=== Concept cars ===
- Alfa Romeo 33.2 Coupe Speciale by Pininfarina
- Asardo 1500 AR-S
- Aston Martin Bulldog
- Aston Martin Valkyrie
- Bertone Birusa
- Buick Riviera Concept
- BMW Turbo
- BMW Z9 – gullwing door on driver's side, with conventional door on passenger's side
- Chevrolet Aerovette
- Citroën Tubik
- Daewoo Mya
- DeLorean Alpha5
- Ferrari 250 P5 Berlinetta by Pininfarina
- Ferrari Sergio
- Ford Corrida
- Ford Cougar 406
- Ford Evos – front gullwing doors, with rear gullwing doors
- Giugiaro Brivido
- Gumpert Tornante
- GM Ultralite
- Hyundai Nuvis
- Infiniti Triant
- Isdera Commendatore 112i
- Italdesign Davinci
- Italdesign Giugiaro Clipper – front butterfly doors, with rear gullwing doors
- Jiotto Caspita
- Kia KV7 – conventional front doors, with rear gullwing doors
- Kodiak F1
- Koenigsegg Quant
- Lamborghini Marzal
- Lancia Mizar
- Lexus LF-30
- Lincoln Navigator Concept
- Matra Laser
- Mazel Identity i1
- Mazda HR-X
- Mazda Ryuga
- Mazda RX-500 – butterfly front doors, with gullwing doors over the engine compartment
- Mercedes-Benz AMG Vision Gran Turismo
- Mercedes-Benz C111
- Mercedes-Benz C111 - III
- Mercedes-Benz C112
- Mercedes-Benz F125
- Nissan Mixim
- Nissan NX-21 Concept
- Oldsmobile Incas
- Opel ECO Speedster
- Opel Monza
- Peugeot Polygon
- Pininfarina H2 Speed
- Porsche Tapiro
- Renault Mégane Coupe – a concept car based on the Renault Mégane with gullwing doors
- Renault Nepta
- Renault Ondelios
- Renault Talisman
- Rolls-Royce 101EX
- Subaru Hybrid Tourer
- Toyota Fine-X, Fine-T
- Toyota i-Road
- Toyota Concept-愛i Ride
- Ultima Mk1
- Vauxhall Monza
- Vauxhall XVR
- Volvo C30 IPD SEMA
- Volvo Your Concept Car

== Suicide doors ==
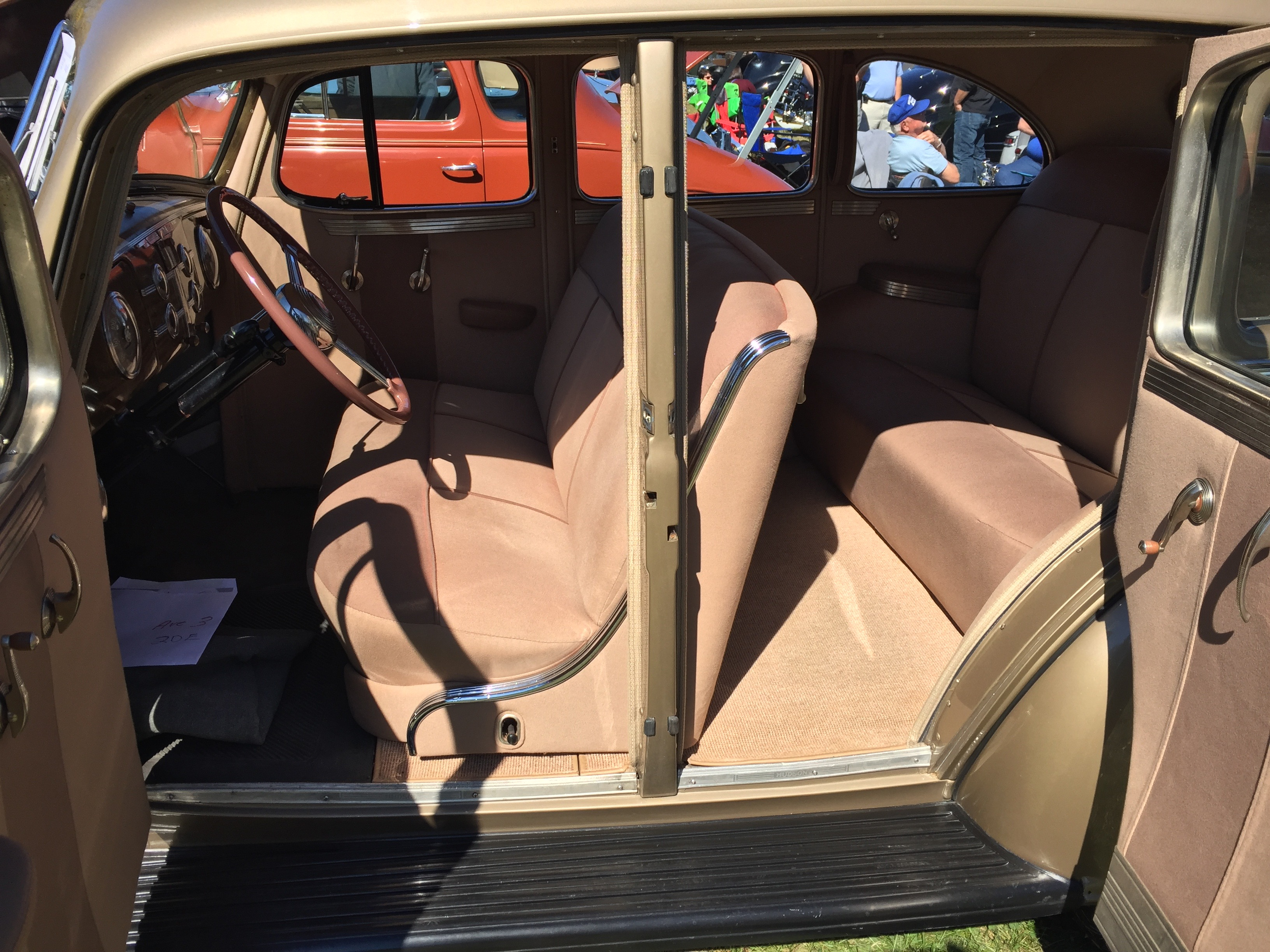
1938 Hudson 112 sedan with its conventional front and rear suicide doors open

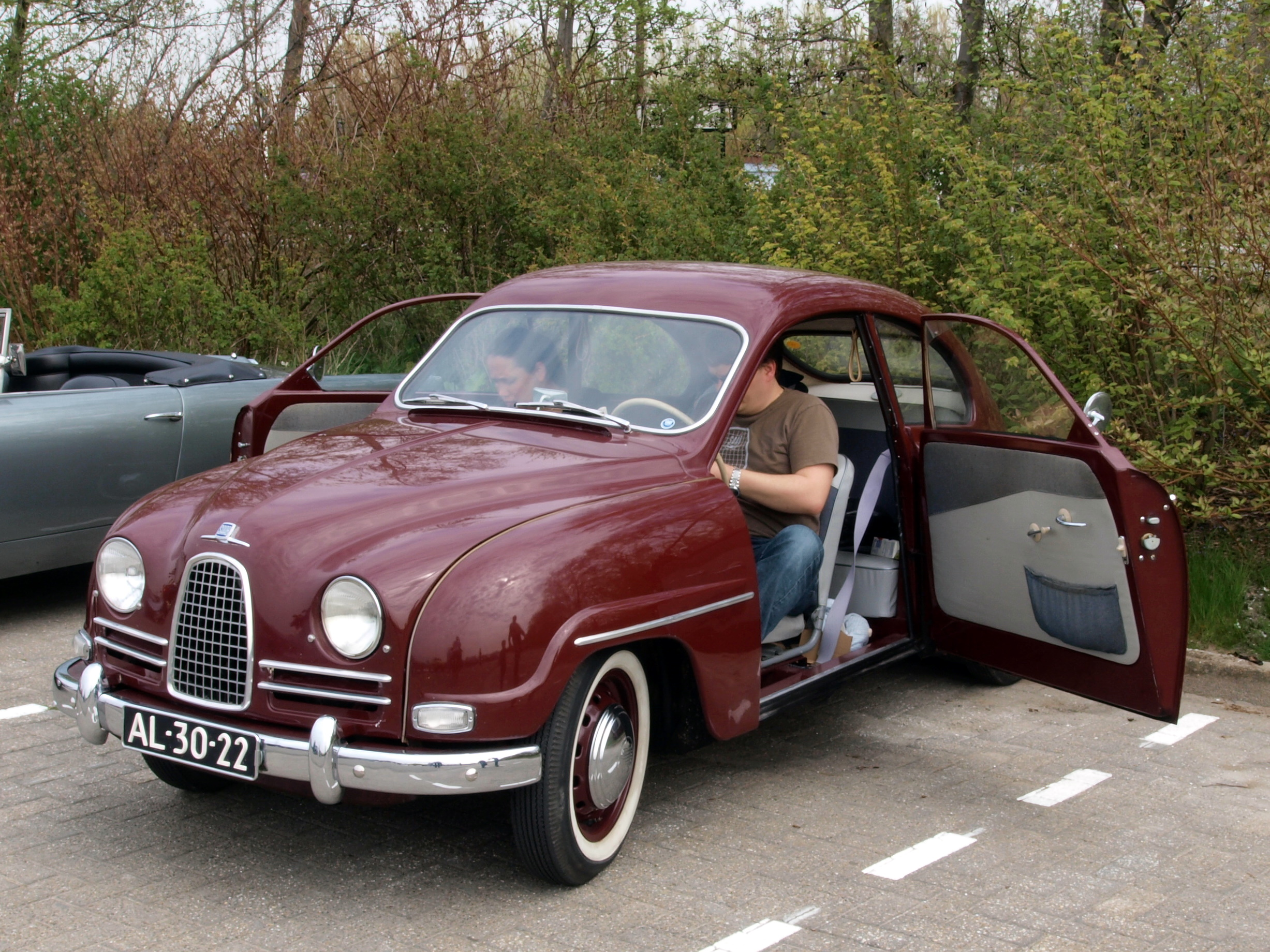
Saab 93B with its front suicide doors open

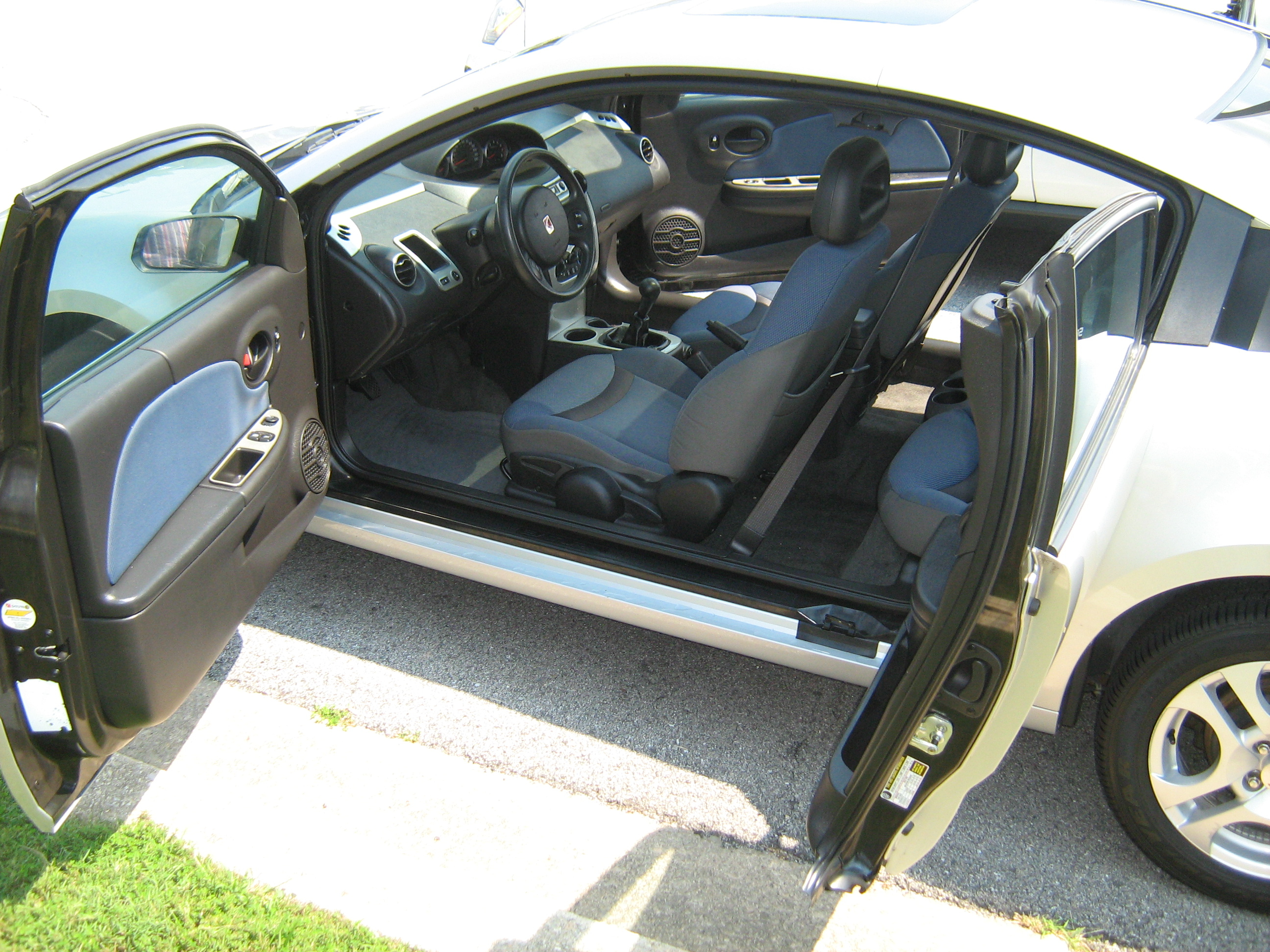
Saturn Ion Quad Coupe with its suicide half-rear doors open

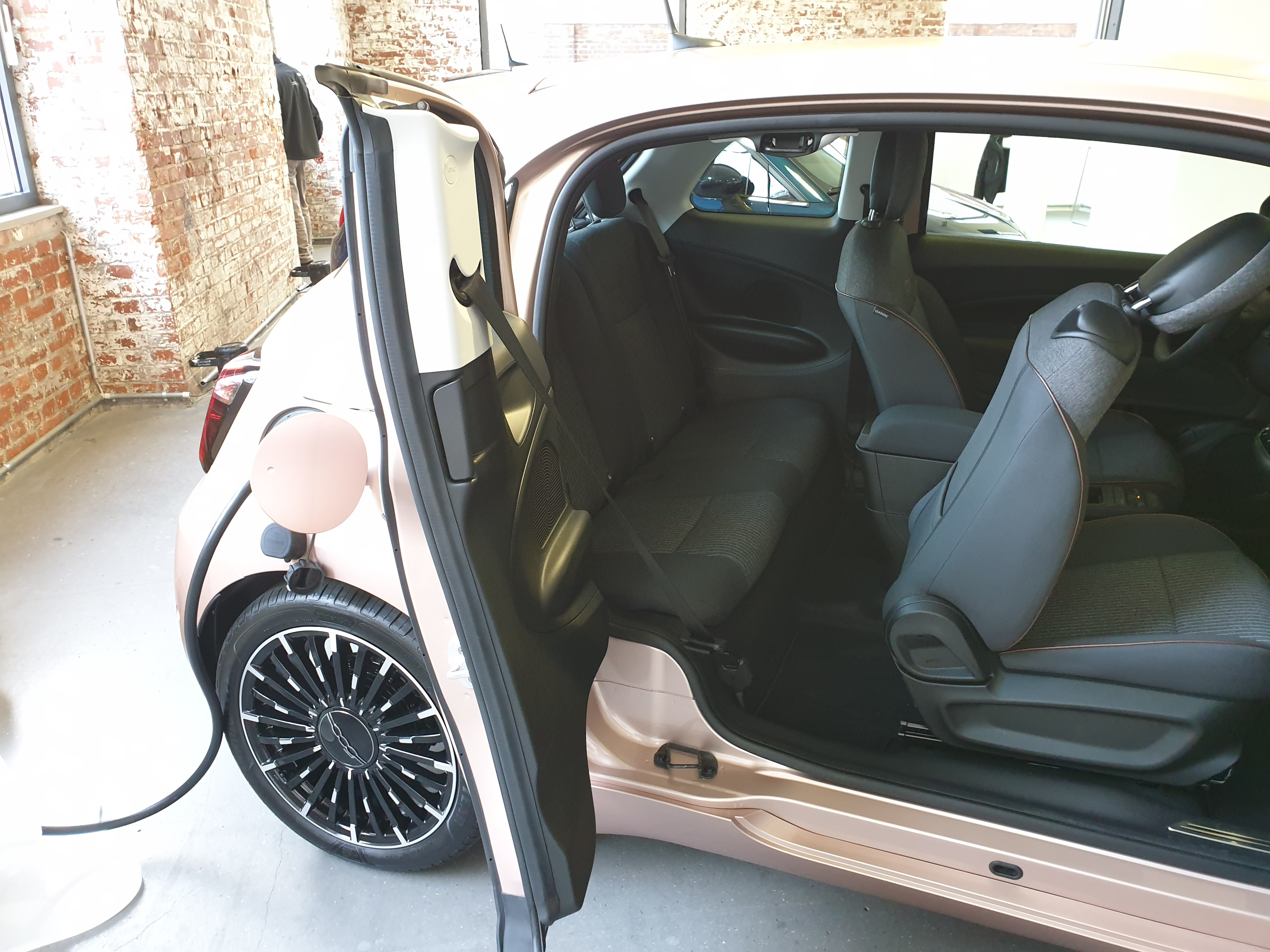
Fiat 500e "3+1" with single suicide half-rear door open

Models of automobiles that featured suicide doors (i.e., doors hinged at the rear) include most full-sized extended-cab pickup trucks (rear doors only), and some vehicles categorised:

- AC Petite (1953–1958) (front door on 2-door saloons)
- Acura Precision Concept (2016) (rear door)
- Adler Typ 10 2.5 Litre
- Alfa Romeo 8C
- Alfa Romeo Gloria (2013) (rear door)
- Alfa Romeo Romeo 1 and 2
- Alta A200 (1968–1974) (front door)
- AMC Cavalier (1965) (rear door)
- Aston Martin Atom (1939/1944) (front door)
- Austin 7 (1922–1939) (front door on 2-door tourers, 2-door convertibles, 2-door saloons, 2-door coupes, and 3-door vans)
- Austin FX4 taxi (1958–1997) (rear door)
- Autobianchi Bianchina Trasformabile
- Autobianchi Bianchina Giardiniera
- BAIC BJ100
- Bentley State Limousine
- BMW 331 (1949) (front door)
- BMW 502 4-door sedans (1954–1964) (rear door)
- BMW i3 (2013–2022) (conventional front doors, with suicide half-rear doors)
- BMW i3 Concept (2011) (rear door)
- BMW Vision Future Luxury (2014) (rear door)
- Borgward Hansa 2400 (1952–1959) (Front and rear doors)
- Borgward Hansa 2400 Pullmanlimousine (1953–1959) (front door)
- Bugatti Type 46 (1929–1939) (front door)
- Bugatti Type 57 (1934–1940) (front door)
- Buick Roadmaster (rear door on 1st generation), (front door on 2nd generation)
- Cadillac Ciel (2011) (rear door)
- Cadillac Eldorado Brougham (1957–1958) (rear door)
- Cadillac LaSalle (1955) (rear door)
- Cadillac Series 65 (1937–1938) (rear door on 4-door sedans)
- Carbon Motors E7 police car (2008–2013) (rear door)
- Carbon Motors TX7 police SUV (2008–2013) (rear door)
- Chevrolet Biscayne XP-37 (1955) (rear door)
- Chevrolet Greenbrier
- Chevrolet Master 2-door sedans (1935) (front door)
- Chevrolet Master Deluxe 2-door sedans (1935) (front door)
- Chrysler Airflow 4-door sedans (1934–1937) (rear door)
- Chrysler Akino (2005) (rear door)
- Chrysler Cirrus Concept (1992) (rear door)
- Chrysler Imperial Concept (2006) (rear door)
- Chrysler Royal (1933–1950) (rear door on 4-door sedans)
- Chrysler Windsor 4-door sedan (1946–1948) (rear door)
- Citroën 2CV (1948–1964) (front door)
- Citroën Activa (rear door)
- Citroën C3 Lumiere (1998) (rear door)
- Citroën C-SportLounge (2005) (rear door)
- Citroën C6 Lignage (1999) (rear door)
- Citroën H Van
- Citroën Hypnos (2008) (rear door)
- Citroën Metropolis (2010) (rear door)
- Citroën Revolte (2009) (conventional front doors, with suicide half-rear doors)
- Citroën Traction Avant (1934–1957) (front door on 4-door sedans, 2-door sedans, 2-door convertibles, and 5-door hatchbacks)
- Citroën Xanae (1994) (rear door)
- Dacia Duster Concept (2009) (rear door)
- Daihatsu Deca Deca (2009) (rear door)
- Daihatsu Deca Deca (2013) (conventional front doors, with suicide half-rear doors)
- Daihatsu FX (2015) (rear door)
- Daihatsu Hijet (1964–1968) (front door on vans and pickup trucks)
- Daihatsu Hinata (2015) (rear door)
- Dannenhauer & Stauss Cabriolet (1951–1957)(front door)
- Datsun Model 16 (1937–1938) (front door)
- Delahaye Type 135
- Denza EV (2012) (rear door)
- DKW 1000 S (1958–1961) (front door)
- DKW F7 (1937–1939) (front door on 2-door sedans, 2-door cabriolet sedans, and 2-door coupe cabriolets)
- DKW F8 (1939–1942) (front door on 2-door sedans, 2-door cabriolets, 2-door sedan deliveries, and 2-door flatbed trucks)
- Dodge Hornet (2006) (rear door)
- Dodge Super 8 Hemi (2001) (rear door)
- DS Divine (2014) (Butterfly front doors, with rear suicide doors)
- EMW 340 (1949–1955) (front door)
- Ferrari Purosangue (rear doors)
- Fiat 500 (1957–1965) (front door)
- Fiat 500 Spyder Bertone (1947) (front door)
- Fiat 508C (1937–1953) (rear door on 4-door sedans)
- Fiat 515 4-door sedans (1931–1935) (rear door)
- Fiat 518 Ardita 4-door sedans (1933–1938) (front door)
- Fiat 600 (1955–1969) (front door)
- Fiat 600 Multipla
- Fiat 1100 (1953–1969) (front door on 4-door sedans and 5-door estates)
- Fiat 1200 (1957–1961) (front door on 4-door sedans)
- Fiat AR 55 Campagnola
- Fiat Topolino (1936–1955) (front door)
- Fiat 500e "3+1" (single suicide half-rear door)
- Ford 021C (1999) (rear door)
- Ford 24.7 Wagon
- Ford F-150 SuperCab (1997–present) (conventional front doors, with suicide half-rear doors)
- Ford F-250 Super Chief
- Ford Iosis X (2006) (rear door)
- Ford Model U
- Ford Ranger SuperCab (2000–present) (conventional front doors, with suicide half-rear doors)
- Ford Thunderbird 4-door sedans (1967–1971) (rear door)
- Fuldamobil (1950–1969) (front door on 2-door coupes and 2-door convertibles)
- GMC Granite (2010) (rear door)
- Goggomobil 2-door sedans (1955) (front door)
- Hino 4CV (1953–1961) (front door on 4-door sedans and 4-door convertibles)
- Honda Element (2003–2011) (conventional front doors, with suicide half-rear doors)
- HiPhi X (2020–present) (rear door)
- Hongqi 77X (2015–present) (rear door)
- Hongqi CA 72
- Hongqi CA 770/772/773
- Hongqi CA 7650
- Hongqi HQE
- Hupmobile Skylark (1938-1940) (Rear door)
- Hyundai Blue-Will (2009) (rear door)
- Hyundai Genesis HCD-14 (2013) (rear door)
- Hyundai Portico
- Hyundai Santa Cruz (2015) (conventional front doors, with suicide half-rear doors)
- Hyundai Prophecy Concept (2020) (conventional front doors, with suicide rear doors)
- Infiniti Etherea (2011) (rear door)
- Infiniti Kuraza (2005) (rear door)
- Infiniti Q80 Inspiration (2014) (rear door)
- Invacar
- Isuzu GBX (2001) (rear door)
- Italdesign Giugiaro Gea (2015) (rear door)
- JAC SC-9 (2014) (rear door)
- Jaguar B99 (2011) (rear door)
- Jaguar Mark IV (1935–1949) (Front suicide doors, with rear suicide doors)
- Jaguar R-D6 (2003) (conventional front doors, with suicide half-rear doors)
- Jowett Javelin (1947–1953) (front door on 4-door sedans)
- Kia Cross GT (2013) (rear door)
- Kia GT (2011) (rear door)
- Kia KND-7 (2013) (rear door)
- Kia Naimo (2012) (conventional front doors, with suicide half-rear doors)
- Kia Novo (2015) (rear door)
- Kia Optima Convertible Concept (2015) (rear door)
- Kia Ray PHEV (2010) (rear door)
- Kia Soul Concept (2008) (rear door)
- Kia Telluride (2016) (rear door)
- Kurogane Baby (1959–1961) (front door on vans and pickup trucks)
- Lagonda 3-Litre (1953–1958) (front door)
- Lancia Aprilia 4-door sedan (1937–1949) (rear door)
- Lancia Ardea 4-door sedan (1939–1953) (rear door)
- Lancia Aurelia 4-door sedan (1950–1958) (rear door)
- Lancia Dialogos (1998) (rear door)
- Lancia Florida I 4-door sedan (1955) (rear door)
- Land Rover Discovery Vision Concept (2014) (rear door)
- Lexus HPX (2003) (rear door)
- Lincoln C Concept (2009) (rear door)
- Lincoln Continental/Lincoln Continental police car (1961–1969)/(1961–1967)/(2019–2021) (rear door on 4-door sedans, 4-door convertibles and police cars)
- Lincoln Continental Concept (2002) (rear door)
- Lincoln MKS Concept (2006) (rear door)
- Lincoln Navicross (2003) (rear door)
- Lincoln-Zephyr (1936–1940) (rear door on 4-door sedans and 4-door convertible sedans)
- Lloyd 300
- Lloyd 400
- Lloyd LT 600 Van
- Maybach Zeppelin (1928–1938) (front door on 4-door sedans, 4-door convertibles, and 2-door convertibles)
- Mazda BT-50 Freestyle Cab (2002–present) (conventional front doors, with suicide half-rear doors)
- Mazda RX-8 Concept (2001) (conventional front doors, with suicide half-rear doors)
- Mazda RX-8 (2003–2011) (conventional front doors, with suicide half-rear doors)
- Mazda Secret Hideout (2001) (rear door)
- Mercedes-Benz 170
- Mercedes-Benz 220 (1951–1955) (front door on 4-door sedans, 2-door coupes, and 2-door cabriolet 'A's)
- Mercedes-Benz Vision GST (2002) (rear door)
- Mercedes-Benz F700 (2008) (rear door)
- Mercedes-Benz Vision G-Code (2014) (conventional front doors, with suicide half-rear doors)
- Mercury Eight 4-door sedan/Mercury Eight police car (1938–1951) (rear door)
- Mercury MC4 (1997) (conventional front doors, with suicide half-rear doors)
- MG Icon (2012) (conventional front doors, with suicide half-rear doors)
- MG TF and TF 1500 (1953–1955) (front door)
- Mini Clubman (2008–2015) (conventional front doors, with single suicide half-rear door)
- Mini Clubvan (2012) (conventional front doors, with single suicide half-rear door)
- Mitsubishi eX Concept (2015) (rear door)
- Mitsubishi Re-Model A (by West Coast Customs) (2017) (rear door)
- Morris Eight (1935–1948) (front door on 2-door sedans, 4-door sedans, 2-door convertibles, and tourers)
- Nash Ambassador (1927–1948) (rear door on 4-door sedans)
- Nissan Ellure (2010) (rear door)
- Nissan Gripz (2015) (Butterfly front doors, with suicide half-rear doors)
- Nissan Intima (2008) (rear door)
- Nissan Prince Royal (1966–1967) (rear door)
- Nissan Qashqai (2004) (rear door)
- Nissan Qazana (2009) (conventional front doors, with suicide half-rear doors)
- Nissan Sway (2015) (rear door)
- Nissan Titan Extended Cab (conventional front doors, with suicide half-rear doors)
- Nissan Townpod (2010) (conventional front doors, with suicide half-rear doors)
- Oldsmobile O4 (2001) (conventional front doors, with suicide half-rear doors)
- Oldsmobile Recon (1999) (rear door)
- Oldsmobile Series 60 (1938–1948) (rear door on 4-door sedans)
- Opel Admiral 4-door saloon/4-door cabriolet (1937–1939) (rear door)
- Opel Flextreme (2008) (rear door)
- Opel Flextreme GT/E (2010) (rear door)
- Opel Kapitän 4-door sedans (1938–1953) (rear door)
- Opel Meriva (2010–2017) (rear door)
- Opel Meriva Concept (2008) (rear door)
- Packard One-Ten (1938–1942) (rear door on 4-door sedans)
- Packard Super Eight (1939–1951) (rear door on 4-door sedans)
- Panhard Dyna Junior
- Panhard Dyna X
- Panhard Dyna Z
- Peel P50
- Peugeot 202 (1938–1942) (front door on 4-door sedans, 2-door cabriolets, and 2-door fourgonettes)
- Peugeot 203 (1948–1960) (front door on 4-door sedans, 5-door estates, 2-door cabriolets, 4-door cabriolets, and 2-door coupes)
- Peugeot 301 (1932–1936) (front door on 4-door sedans, 2-door coupes, 2-door cabriolets, and 3-door vans)
- Peugeot 302
- Peugeot 402
- Peugeot 601
- Peugeot BB1 (2009) (front door)
- Peugeot EX1 Concept (2010) (front door)
- Peugeot Fractal (2016) (front door)
- Peugeot SXC Concept (2011) (rear door)
- Peugeot VLV
- Pininfarina Cambiano (2012) (conventional front doors, with single suicide rear door)
- Pontiac Strato Streak (1954) (rear door)
- Porsche 928 Study H50 (1987) (conventional front doors, with suicide half-rear doors)
- Porsche Mission E (2015) (rear door)
- Praga Piccolo Furgon
- Proton e-Luma (2014) (conventional front doors, with suicide half-rear doors)
- Renault 4CV (1946–1961) (front door on 4-door sedans and 4-door convertibles)
- Renault Celtaquatre 4-door sedan/2-door coupe/2-door cabriolet (1934–1938) (front door)
- Renault Egeus (2005) (rear door)
- Renault Eolab (2014) (rear door)
- Renault Frendzy (2011) (conventional front doors, with single suicide door and single sliding door)
- Renault Initiale Paris (2013) (rear door)
- Renault Monaquatre 4-door sedan (1931–1936) (rear door)
- Renault R-Space (2011) (rear door)
- Renault Twin'Z (2013) (rear door)
- Renault Vivastella 4-door sedan (1934–1939) (front door)
- Riley RM (1945–1955) (front door on 4-door sedans and 2-door convertibles)
- Rolls-Royce Cullinan (2018–present) (rear door)
- Rolls-Royce 200EX (2009) (rear door)
- Rolls-Royce Dawn (2015–present) (front door)
- Rolls-Royce Ghost (2010–present) (rear door)
- Rolls-Royce Ghost EWB (2011–present) (rear door)
- Rolls-Royce Phantom (2003–2017) (rear door)
- Rolls-Royce Phantom (2018–present) (rear door)
- Rolls-Royce Phantom Coupe (2008–2017) (front door)
- Rolls-Royce Phantom Drophead Coupe (2007–2017) (front door)
- Rolls-Royce Phantom EWB (2005–2017) (rear door)
- Rolls-Royce Phantom I, II, III, IV, V and VI
- Rolls-Royce Silver Dawn (1949–1955) (front door on 4-door sedans)
- Rolls-Royce Silver Wraith (1946–1958) (rear door on 4-door sedans)
- Rolls-Royce Wraith (2013–present) (front door)
- Rover P3 4-door sedan (1948–1949) (Front suicide doors, with rear suicide doors)
- Rover P3 4-door sports sedan (1948–1949) (Front suicide doors, with rear suicide doors)
- Rover P4 (1949–1964) (rear door on 4-door sedans)
- Russo-Baltique Impression (2007) (front door)
- Saab 92 (1949–1956) (front door on 2-door coupes)
- Saab 93 (1956–1960) (front door on 2-door coupes)
- Saturn Flextreme (2008) (rear door)
- Saturn Ion Quad Coupe (2002–2007) (conventional front doors, with suicide half-rear doors)
- Saturn SC (1999–2002) (conventional front doors, with single suicide half-rear door)
- Scion t2B (2005) (conventional front doors, with suicide half-rear doors)
- SEAT 600 and SEAT 600 D (1957–1970) (front door on 2-door sedans)
- SEAT 800 (1963–1968) (front door on 4-door sedans)
- Simca 6 (1947–1950) (front door on 2-door coupes and 3-door vans)
- Simca 8 4-door sedan (1937–1951) (rear door)
- Singulato iS6 (2018–2023)
- Singer Hunter (1954–1956) (rear door on 4-door sedans)
- Singer SM1500 (1948–1954) (rear door on 4-door sedans)
- Škoda Superb 4-door sedan (1934–1949) (front door)
- Škoda VOS 4-door sedan (1949–1952) (front door)
- Spyker D12 Peking-to-Paris (2006) (rear door)
- Studebaker Champion 4-door sedans (1947–1952) (rear door)
- Subaru 360 (1958–1971) (front door on 2-door sedans and 2-door convertibles)
- Subaru B11S (2003) (conventional front doors, with suicide half-rear doors)
- Subaru Sambar (1961–1966) (front door on vans and pickup trucks)
- Sunbeam-Talbot 90 (1948–1954) (rear door on 4-door sedans)
- Sunbeam-Talbot Ten 4-door sedan (1938–1948) (Front suicide doors, with rear suicide doors)
- Suzuki Mom's Personal Wagon (2005) (rear door)
- Suzulight FB/FBD (1961–1965) (front door on 3-/4-door vans and 2-door pickup trucks)
- Ssangyong XIV-1 (2011) (rear door)
- Tata Nexon (2014) (conventional front doors, with suicide half-rear doors)
- Tatra 57 2-door coupes (1932–1949) (front door)
- Tatra 600 (1947–1952) (front door)
- Toyota AA 4-door sedans (1936–1943) (rear door)
- Toyota A-BAT (2007) (conventional front doors, with suicide half-rear doors)
- Toyota Century Royal
- Toyota Crown (1955–1962) (rear door on 4-door sedans)
- Toyota FJ Cruiser (2006–2018) (conventional front doors, with suicide half-rear doors)
- Toyota FT-SX (2005) (rear door)
- Toyota Hybrid X (2007) (rear door)
- Toyota ME.WE (2013) (rear door)
- Toyota Origin (2000–2001) (rear door)
- Toyota Tacoma
- Triumph Renown (front doors)
- Tucker 48 (rear doors)
- Vauxhall 10-4 4-door sedan/2-door coupe/2-door tourer/2-door roadster (1937–1940) (front door)
- Vauxhall Meriva (2010–2017) (rear door)
- Venucia VOW (2015) (rear door)
- Vespa 400 (1957–1961) (front door)
- Volkswagen Concept A (2006) (conventional front doors, with suicide half-rear doors)
- Volkswagen Nezza (2006) (rear door)
- Volkswagen Transporter (T1) (1950–1967) (conventional front doors, with single conventional half-rear door and single suicide half-rear door)
- Volkswagen Type 147 Kleinlieferwagen (1964–1974) (front door on 2-door panel vans)
- Volvo Concept Universe (2011) (rear door)
- Volvo Concept You (2011) (rear door)
- Volvo PV 36 Carioca (1935–1938) (front door on 4-door sedans)
- Volvo Venus Bilo (1933) (rear door)
- W Motors Fenyr SuperSport (2017–present) (front suicide swan doors)
- W Motors Lykan HyperSport (2013–2017) (front suicide swan doors)
- Wanderer W22
- Wanderer W24
- Zastava 750 (1955–1969) (front door)
- ZAZ-965 Zaporozhets (1960–1969) (front door)

== Canopy doors ==
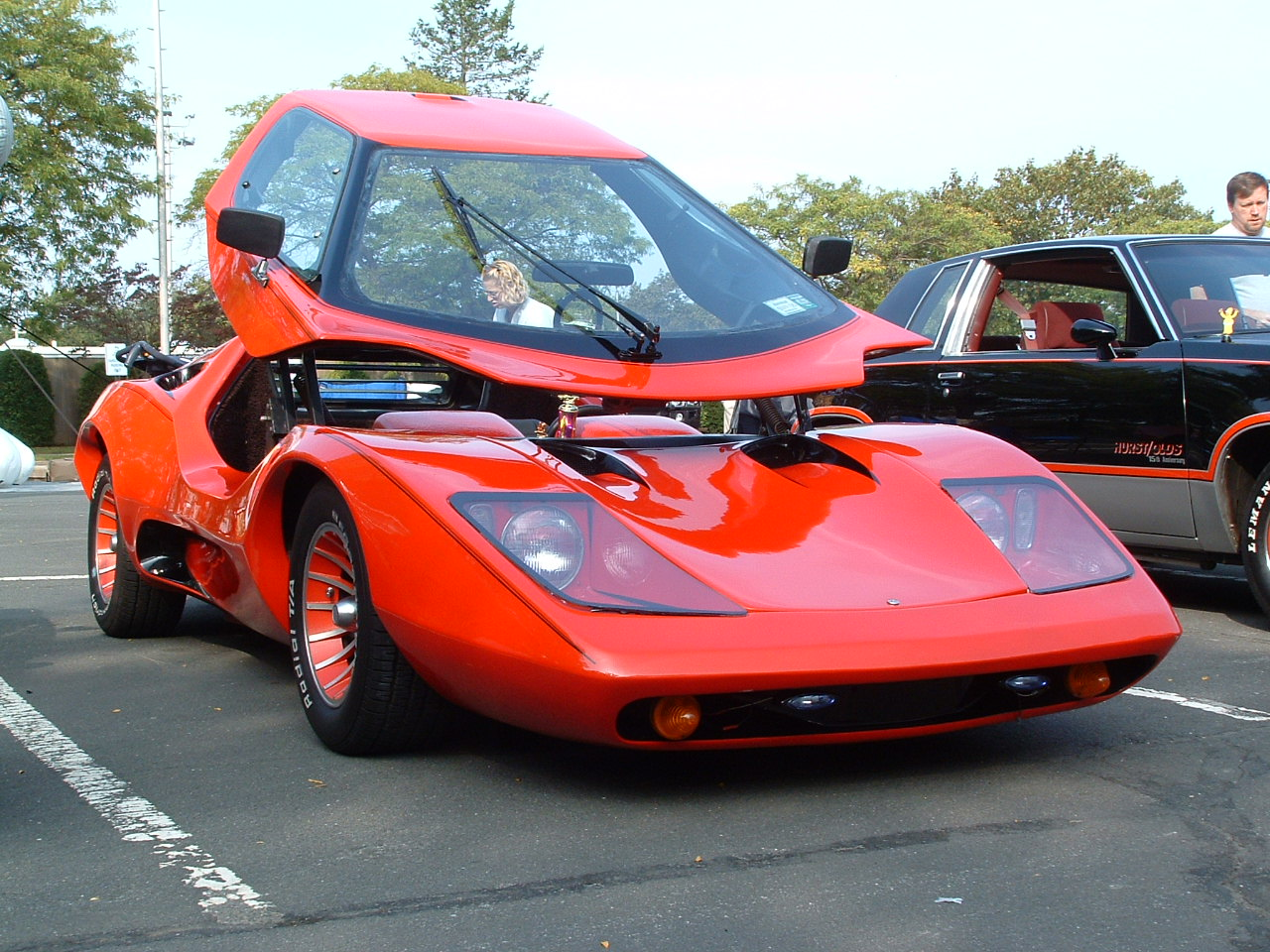
Lifting canopy on a Sterling Nova

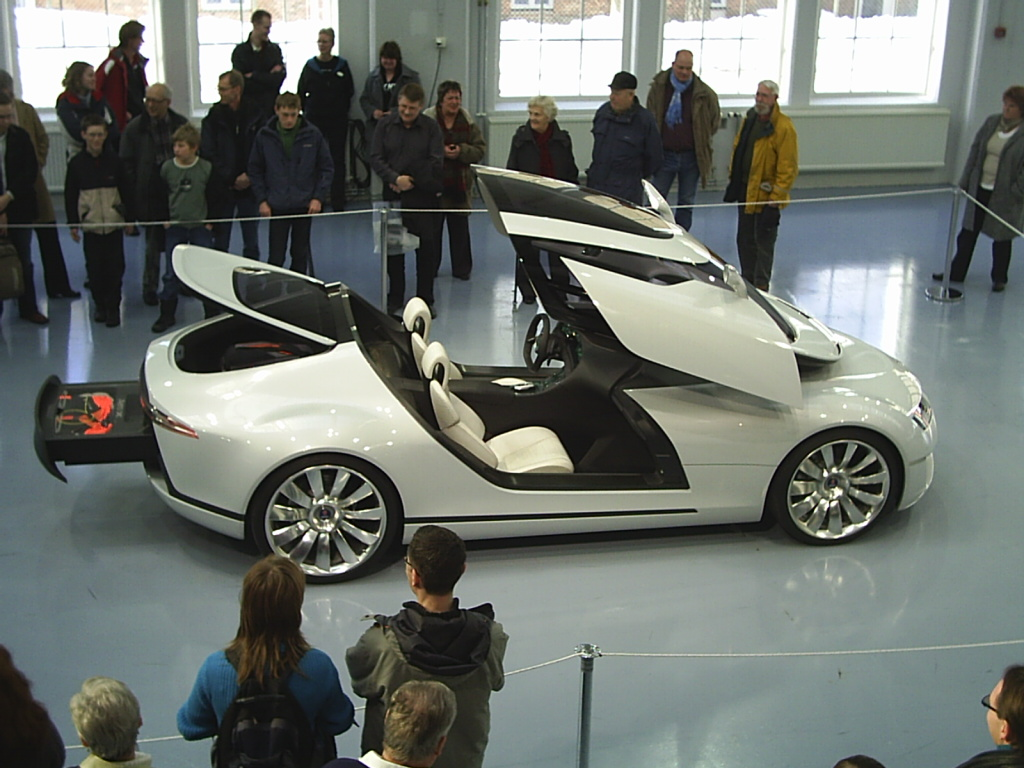
Canopy doors on a Saab Aero-X

- AMC Amitron Concept (side and windows with roof pivot back on counterbalanced hinges, clamshell-style)
- Alfa Romeo Scarabeo concept
- Audi Avatar Concept
- Audi Urban Concept (rearward sliding canopy)
- Ed Roth's Beatnik Bandit "kustom" show car
- Bond Bug
- Bugatti Aerolithe
- Buick Wildcat Concept
- Bremen Sebring
- Chevrolet Corvair Monza GT concept
- Chevrolet Express (concept car)
- Chevrolet Testudo (canopy-hinged at the front)
- Chrysler Turboflite (glass canopy, hinge on rear)
- Citroën Osée
- Corvette CX concept
- Daihatsu UFE-III
- Delage D12
- Dodge Charger III
- Faraday Future FFZERO1 concept
- Ferrari 512s Berlinetta Speciale by Pininfarina concept
- Ferrari Modulo
- Fiat Abarth 2000 Scorpione (Pininfarina concept)
- FMR Tg500 (aircraft-style canopy, hinge on right side)
- General Motors EN-V (suicide-canopy, hinge on rear)
- Holden Hurricane
- Ikenga GT concept
- Isetta
- Isuzu COA
- Italdesign Quaranta
- KTM X-Bow GTX
- Lamborghini Egoista
- Lamborghini Terzo Millennio
- Lancia Stratos Zero concept car
- Lincoln Futura (glass roof canopy hinged at the rear)
- Loremo (large bottom-hinged front canopy)
- Maserati Birdcage 75th – extended canopy door, front 2/3 of the top of the car lifts up and moves forward
- Messerschmitt Kabinenroller (aircraft-style canopy, hinge on right side)
- Messerschmitt KR175 and Messerschmitt KR200 (aircraft-style canopy, hinge on right side)
- Murray T25 and Murray T27
- Nissan 126X
- Nova (kit car) (Sterling Nova)
- Opel CD
- Opel RAK e
- PATEO Project N
- Paulin VR
- Peel Trident (flip-top door that opens like a canopy)
- Polestar Synergy concept
- Puma GTV
- Purvis Eureka
- RAESR Tachyon Speed
- Renault Racoon
- Renault Trezor
- Rinspeed Ichange concept
- Saab Aero-X – (canopy lifts upward and forward, sides move outward and forward)
- Sbarro Autobau concept
- Škoda 110 Super Sport
- Smyk – Single front-mounted door was hinged at the bottom.
- Suzuki Pixy + SSC – The SSC has its doors hinged at both the front and rear of the car, but the Pixy has a glass roof canopy hinged at the rear.
- Syrma IED (rear-hinged canopy)
- Techrules Ren
- Toyota i-Unit (glass roof canopy hinged at the rear)
- Toyota EX-7 (rear-hinged canopy similar to Syrma IED)
- Toyota Publica Sports (rearward sliding canopy)
- Tramontana (sports car)
- Volkswagen L1
- Volkswagen Nils
- Yamaha OX99-11
- Zagato Raptor

== Swan doors ==
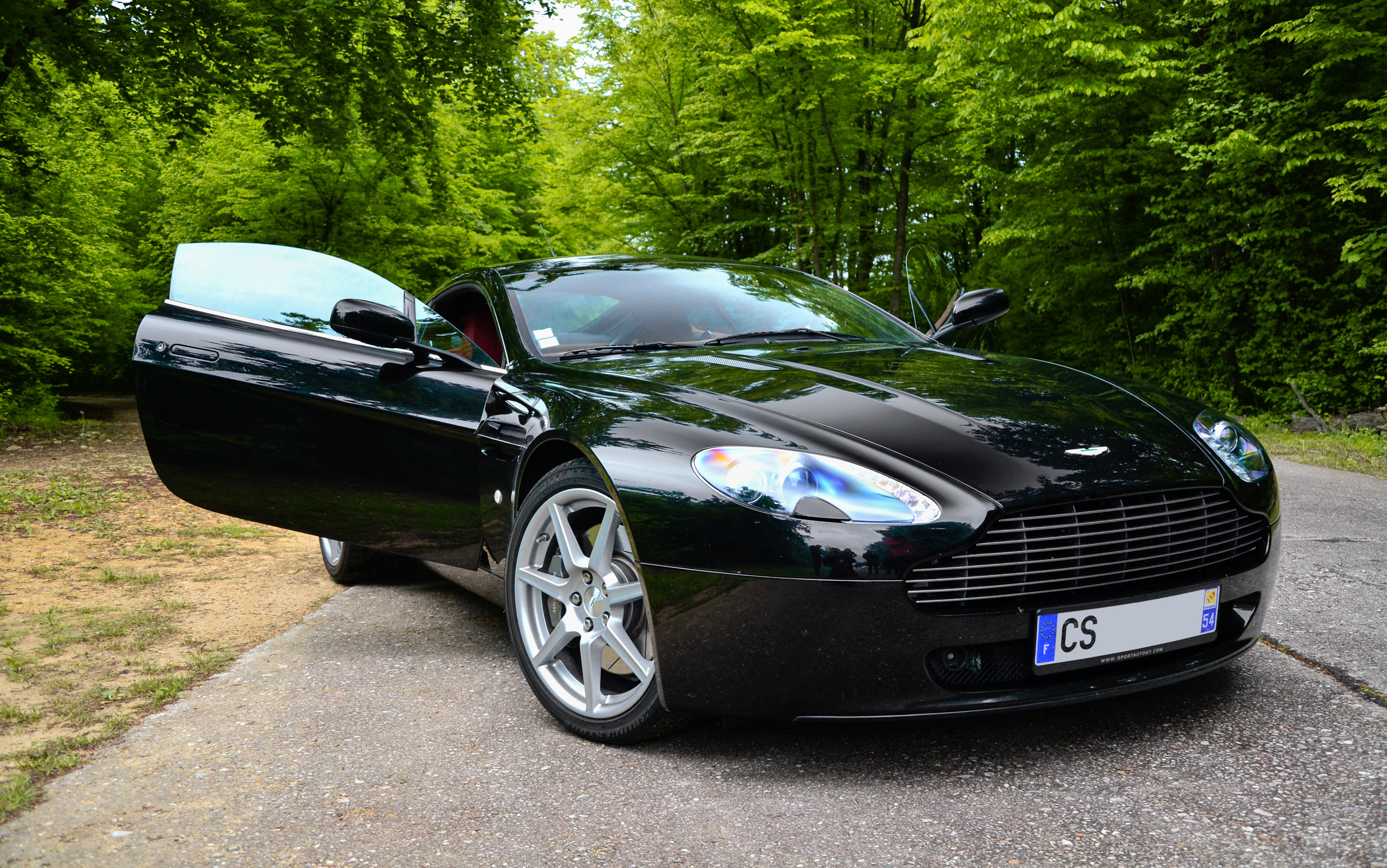
Aston Martin Vantage with swan doors

Swan doors open outward like either a conventional door or a suicide door, but hinge slightly upward as well for better ground clearance, includes some vehicles categorised:

=== Road-legal cars ===
- Alfa Romeo Disco Volante
- Aston Martin DB9
- Aston Martin DB10
- Aston Martin DBS V12
- Aston Martin DBX
- Aston Martin DP-100
- Aston Martin One-77
- Aston Martin Rapide
- Aston Martin Rapide S
- Aston Martin Rapide Jet
- Aston Martin Rapide Bertone Jet 2+2
- Aston Martin V8 Vantage
- Aston Martin Vantage
- Aston Martin Vanquish
- Aston Martin Virage
- Aston Martin Vulcan
- Chevrolet Corvette Stingray –
- LaFerrari Aperta (doors open up and outward at a slight angle) –
- GTA Spano (first generation only)
- Hennessey Venom GT
- Jaguar C-X75
- Lagonda Taraf
- Marussia B2
- Mazzanti Evantra – suicide-swan front doors similar to the W Motors Lykan HyperSport with panels extend to the roof from the top (similar to the Ford GT40)
- Smart Forjeremy – a city car based on the Smart Fortwo with swan doors
- Vencer Sarthe
- Ultima RS
- W Motors Lykan HyperSport – suicide-swan front doors

=== Racing cars ===
- Aston Martin CC100 Speedster

=== Concept cars ===
- Audi RSQ – Suicide-swan front doors
- Bentley EXP 10 Speed 6 Concept
- Bentley EXP 12 Speed 6e Concept
- Bertone Nuccio
- Honda HSC
- Jaguar C-X75
- Kia Pop
- Lamborghini Asterion
- Lumeneo SMERA
- Lotus M250
- Mercedes-Benz F400 Carving
- Nissan Blade Glider
- Nissan Urge
- Peugeot HX1 Concept – conventional-swan front doors, with suicide-swan rear doors
- Peugeot Oxia
- Toyota FT-1
- Toyota NS4
- Volvo 3CC

== Dihedral synchro-helix actuation doors ==
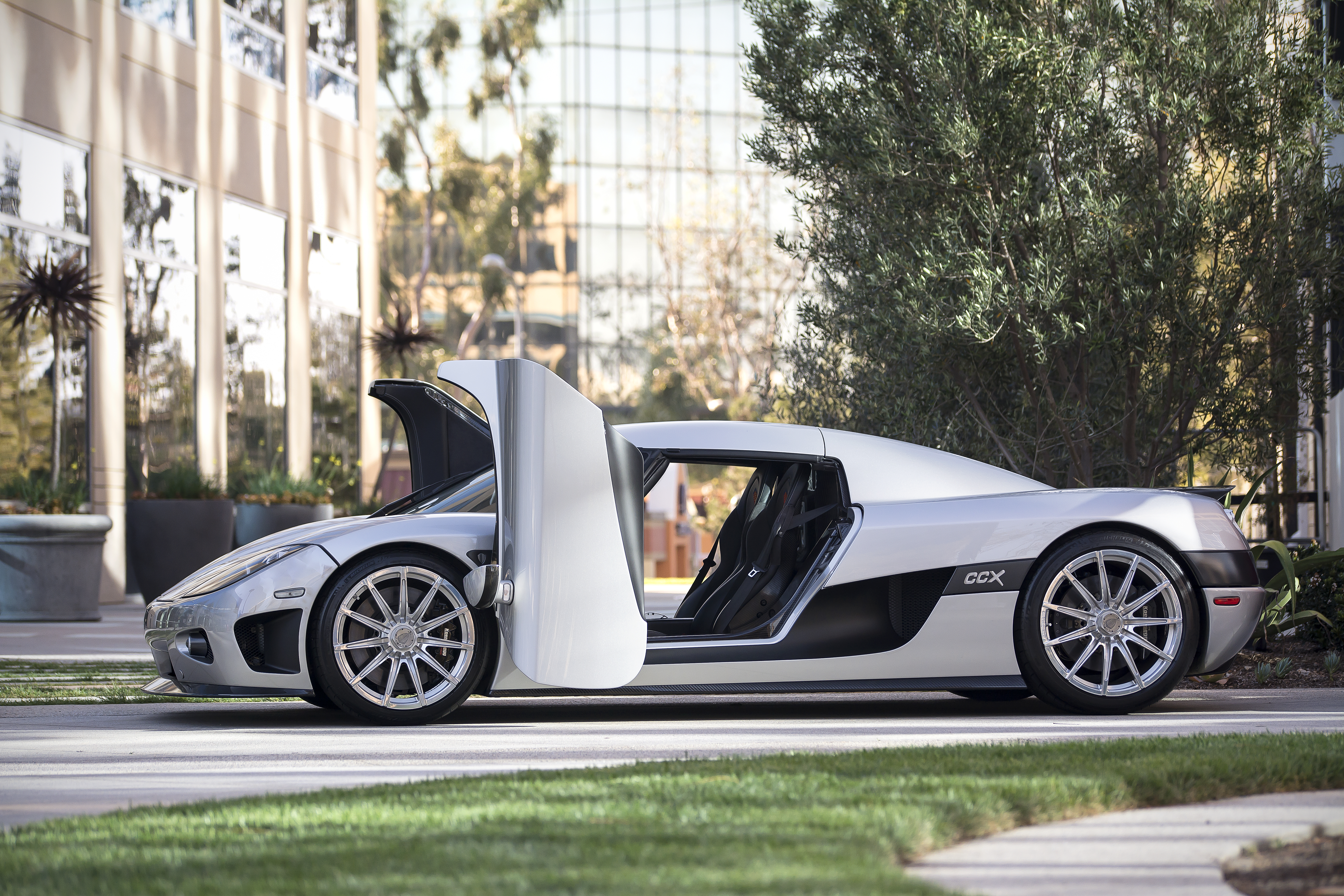
Koenigsegg CCX with dihedral doors open

Dihedral doors are a type of doors found on all Koenigsegg cars. They open by rotating 90° at the hinge.

== Sliding doors ==
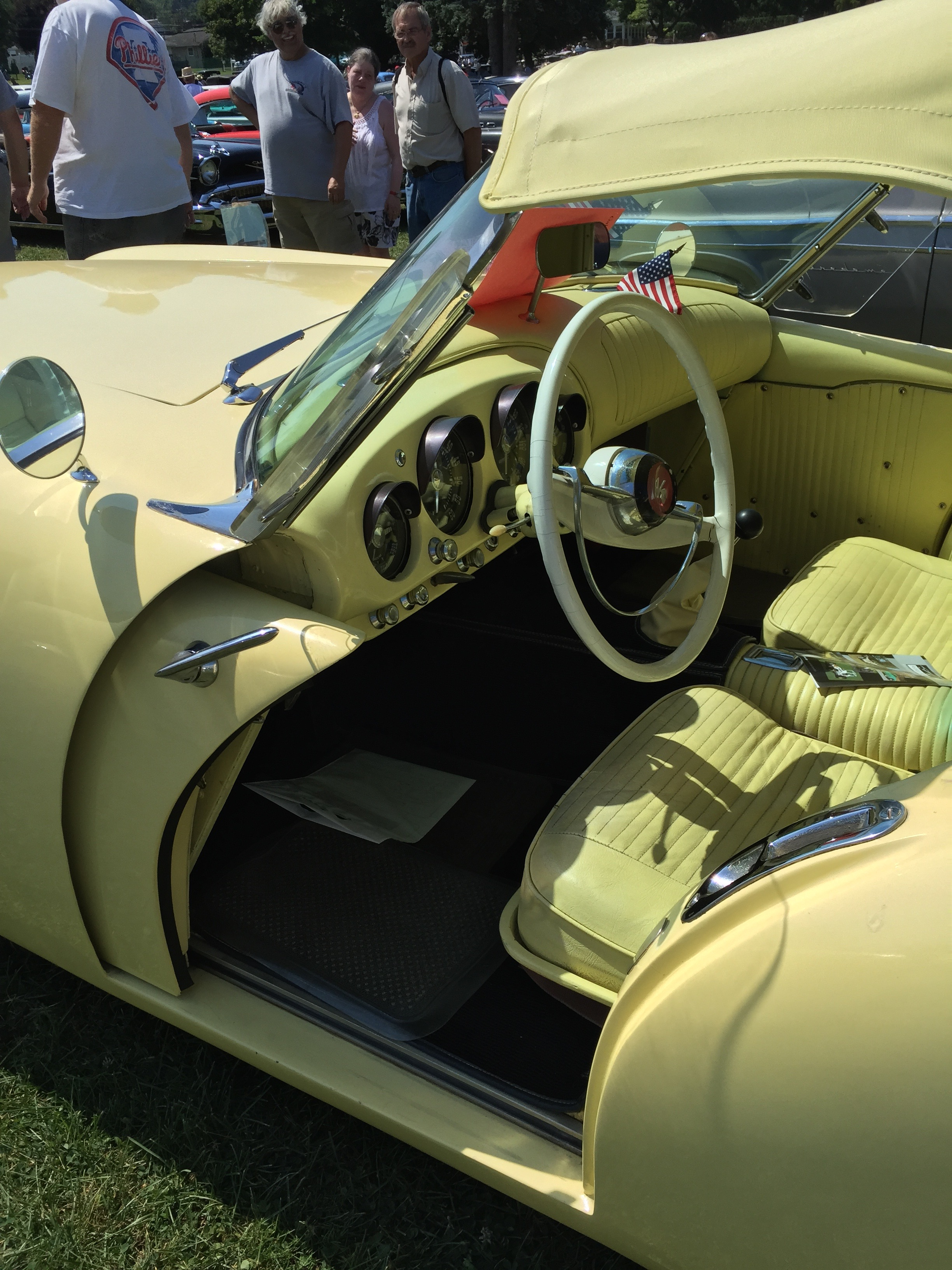
1954 Kaiser Darrin with its sliding pocket door opened

Sliding doors are common on minivans, leisure activity vehicles, light commercial vehicles and minibuses. A few passenger cars have notably also been equipped with sliding doors, such as the Peugeot 1007, the Ford B-Max, the Toyota Porte, and the Suzuki Alto Slide Slim. Many concept cars use the design as well. An even smaller number of cars have featured sliding doors which disappear into the bodywork of the car, such as the BMW Z1 and the 1954 Kaiser Darrin.

=== Concept cars ===
- Bertone Ramarro – forward sliding doors
- Chrysler Portal – front doors slide forward, rear doors slide rearward
- Honda Vision XS-1 – a single sliding door on each side for both the front and rear seats
- Lincoln Mark VIII – rolling door concept–doors slid downwards and disappeared into the bodywork
- Renault Scenic Concept – front doors slide forward, rear doors slide rearward
- Toyota Fine-Comfort Ride Concept – rear doors
- Toyota Kikai Concept
- Volkswagen BUDD-e – rear doors
- Volkswagen ID. – rear doors
- Volkswagen ID. Buzz – rear doors
- Volkswagen ID. Crozz – rear doors

== Other door types ==
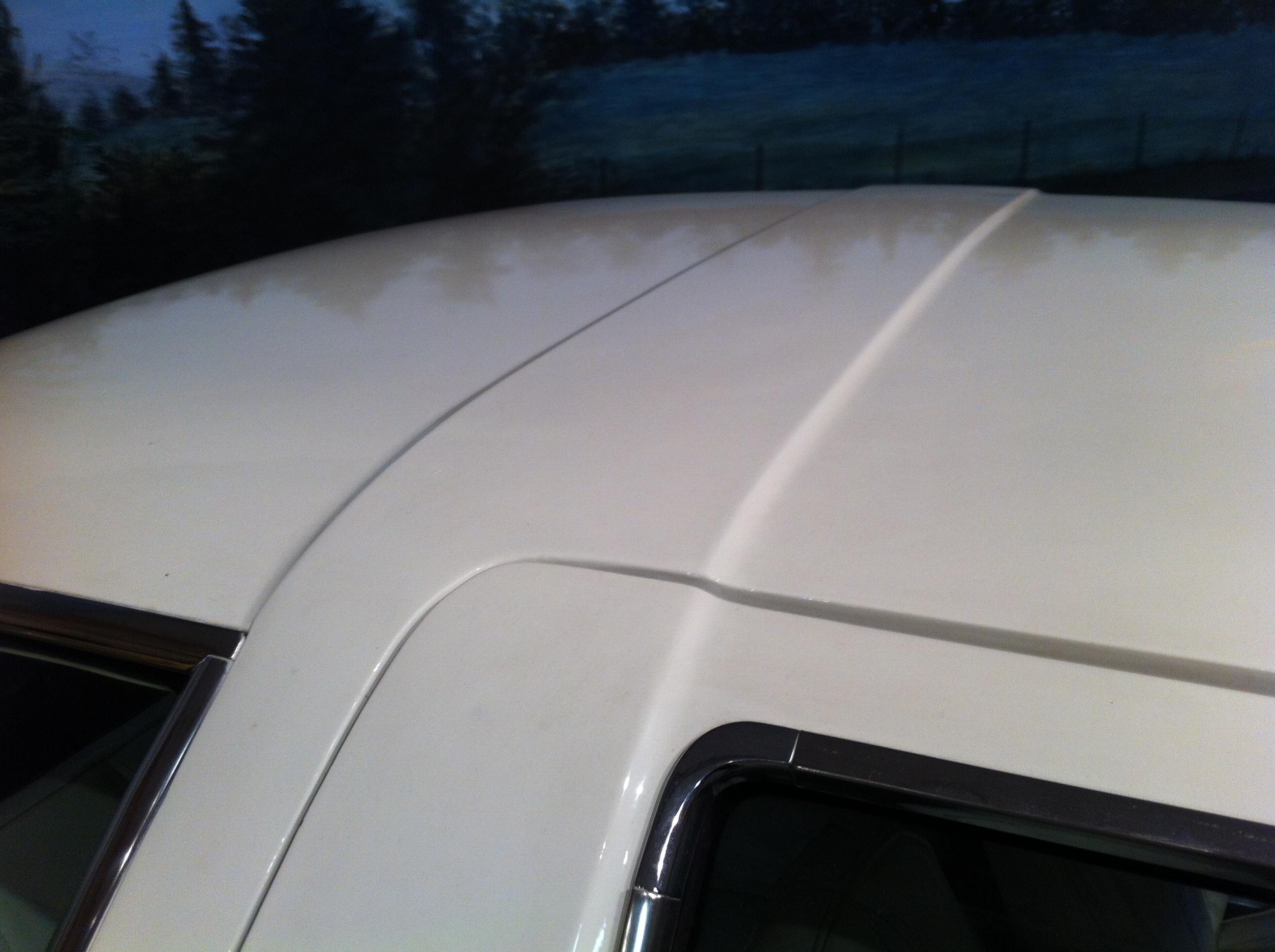
AMC Pacer passenger door is longer than driver's side and disguised by the broad B-pillar while the door's opening cut into the roof also hides the rain gutter.

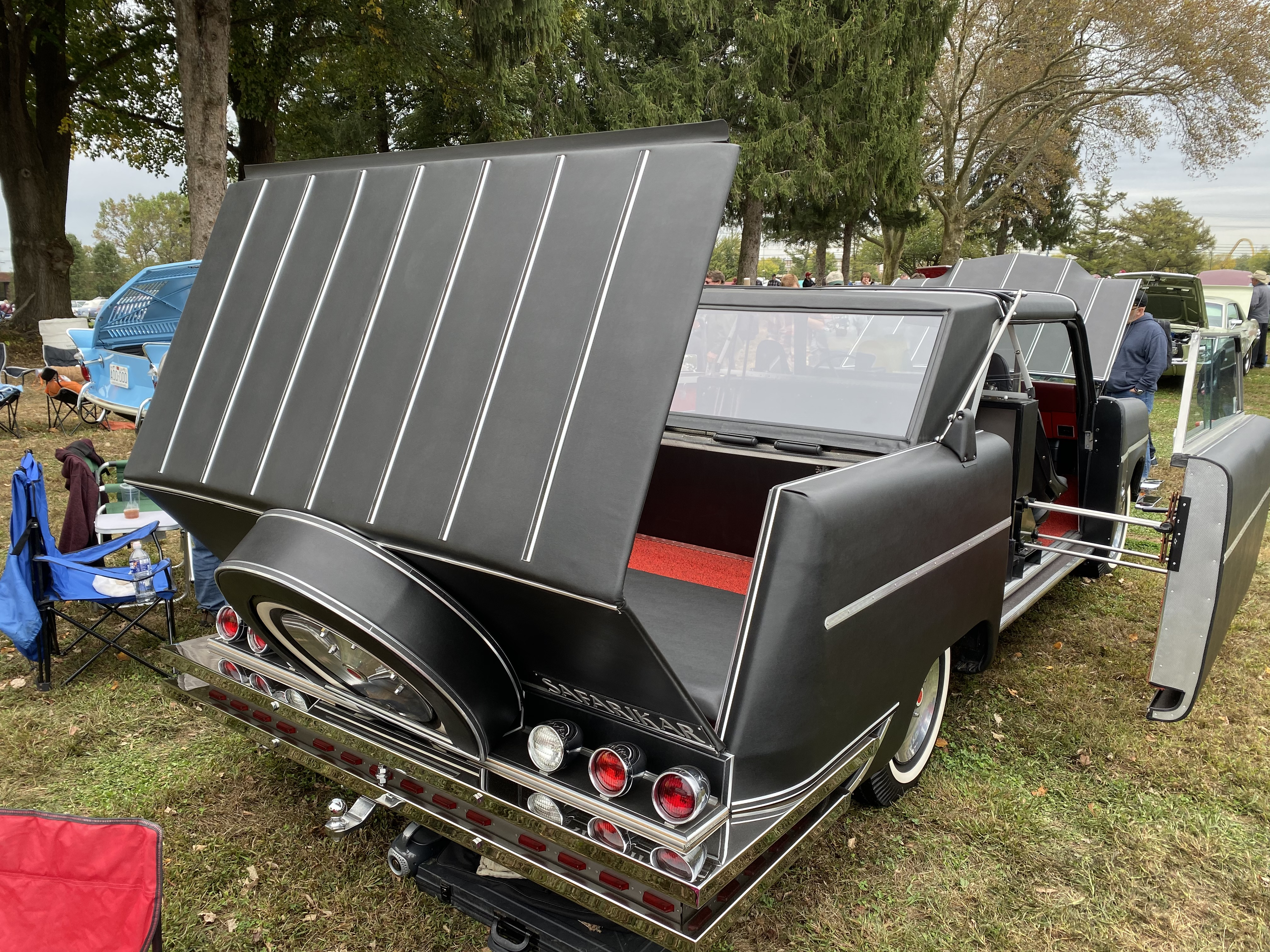
1973 Mohs SafariKar outward sliding door on four centrally mounted rods

- AMC Pacer – Aircraft-style doors improve sealing and reduce wind noise, top of door wraps into the roof, hinges provide an outward arc for the top of the door for easier egress when open, rain gutters are hidden in the roof cut outs, the passenger door is four-inches (101 mm) longer than the driver's and the difference disguised by the broad B-pillar design.
- BMW 600 – Left-side-mounted front door.
- Chrysler ME Four-Twelve – Conventional front doors, but no door handles.
- Ford GT (first generation), Ford GT40 and Ford GT90 – conventional front-hinged doors that have panels extended to the roof of the car (also called aircraft doors).
- Hispano-Suiza H6B Dubonnet Xenia – Rear-hinged pantograph doors, hinged to a box frame which is hinged to the body, which open outwards and back while remaining parallel to the body.
- Hudson Italia – Doors cut 14 inches (356 mm) into the roof (also called aircraft doors).
- Hyundai Veloster – Driver side of the car has one coupe-sized door, but the passenger side has two smaller, sedan-sized doors for front and rear occupants.
- Lincoln Mark VIII Concept – Doors "rolled" into underbody of frame (also called disappearing doors)
- Mercedes-Benz CL C215 – Double-hinged doors which open forward slightly and outward simultaneously.
- Mitsuoka MC-1 – Plastic doors that can be removed when opened.
- Mohs SafariKar – Doors slide outward from the body on four linear rods mounted behind the front row of seats providing egress from both the front and rear of the car when opened.
- Peel Manxcar – Suicide rear-hinged doors that open until it touches the body of the car.
- Renault Avantime – Double-hinged doors which open forward slightly and outward simultaneously.
- Smart Crossblade – Minimal "sword-like" door.
- Suzuki CV1 – One single door in the car's fiberglass body.
- Tata Magic Iris – All three doors are conventional doors, 2 doors on the passenger's side and 1 door on the driver's side.
- TVR Tuscan Speed Six – Conventional front doors, but door handles are in button form under the side mirrors.
- Zündapp Janus – Front- and rear-mounted side-hinged doors.
- HiPhi X – Apart from the suicide doors, there is an extra pair of gullwing-like doors between the C and D pillars which the company marketed as the NT (New-type) doors.

== No doors ==
Some cars – generally those of a very open design – have no doors at all.

- Allard Clipper
- Ariel Atom
- BAC Mono
- Bond Minicar
- Brütsch Mopetta
- Caterham 7
- Goggomobil Dart
- KTM X-Bow
- Lada Revolution I and II
- Lotus Mark VI
- Lotus Super 7
- Meyers Manx classic "dune buggy"
- Mini Beachcomber
- Mini Moke
- Steyr-Puch Haflinger (convertible)
- Trabant Tramp
- Volkswagen Schwimmwagen
- Willys jeep
- Zenos E10
