= Volkswagen Concept A =

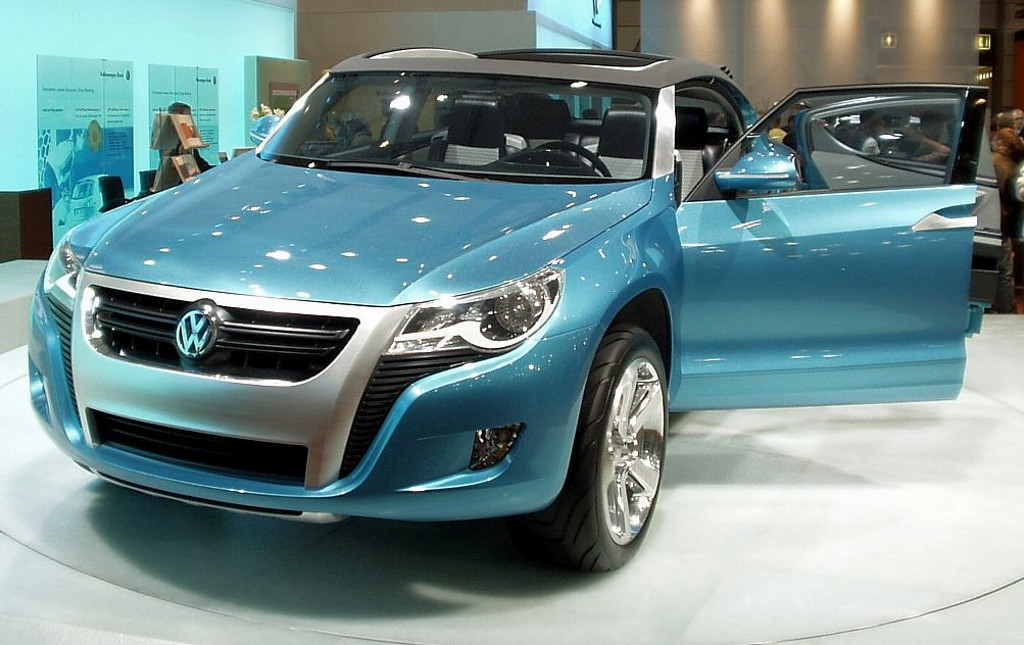

Overview
- Manufacturer: Volkswagen
- Production: 2006 (Concept car)

Body and chassis
- Class: Compact SUV (J)
- Body style: 5-door SUV
- Layout: F4 layout
- Related: Volkswagen Tiguan

Powertrain
- Engine: I4 TSI
- Transmission: 6-speed automatic

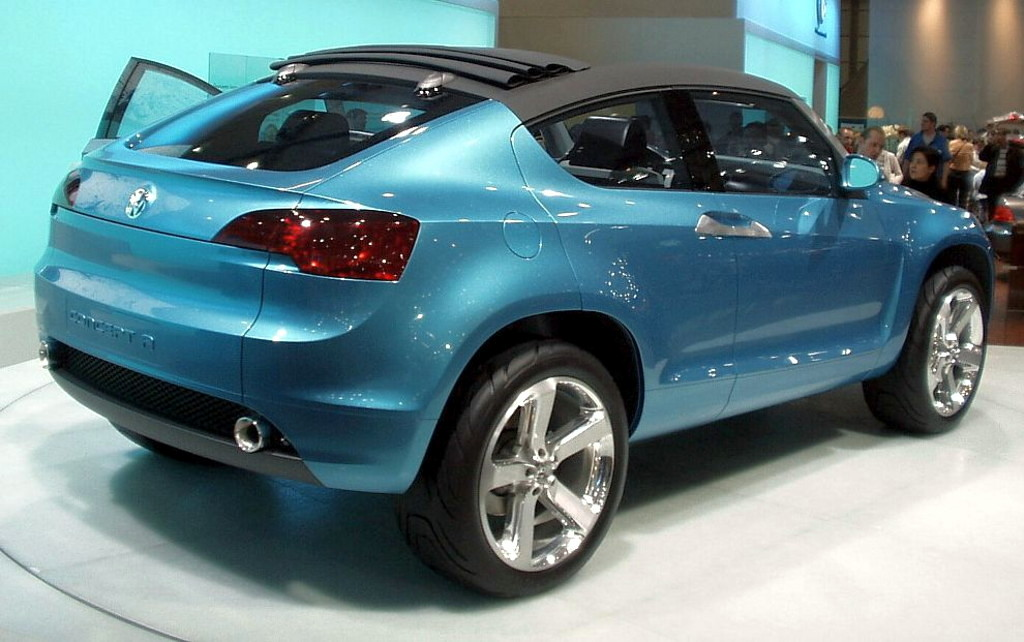
The Volkswagen Concept A

The Volkswagen Concept A was a concept car created by German automobile manufacturer Volkswagen. It was introduced at the 2006 Geneva Motor Show. The Concept A is a cross between a coupé and a crossover sports utility vehicle.

== Description ==
The Concept A was powered by an I4 twincharger (TSI) engine with around 150 horsepower. It has all-wheel drive (AWD) with 4Motion and six gears with automatic transmission. The car's design was sporty but rugged. It is sometimes claimed as a cross between a coupé and a crossover sports utility vehicle because of this styling and design.

A production version of the Concept A, the Tiguan Compact SUV, was expected for sale in the end of 2008. It was launched at the end of 2007 at the Frankfurt Motor Show.
