= NanoFlowcell =

Swiss battery research and development company

nanoFlowcell Holdings plc
- Type: Private
- Industry: Energy; Automotive
- Founded: 1996
- Founder: Nunzio La Vecchia
- Headquarters: Kilchberg, Switzerland
- Key people: Nunzio La Vecchia (CEO); Hektor Bertschi (COO)
- Products: Flow batteries; Electrolyte liquids; Traction motors for electric vehicles
- Services: Research and development
- Parent: nanoFlowcell Holdings plc
- Subsidiaries: nanoFlowcell Management AG
- Website: nanoflowcell.com

nanoFlowcell Holdings plc is a Swiss flow cell battery research and development company.

nanoFlowcell claims to have developed the first flow battery small enough to be used in electric cars. Its battery, also branded nanoFlowcell, was first presented in the Quant E, Quant F and Quantino prototype vehicles. Similar to regular redox flow batteries, the nanoFlowcell battery uses electrolyte fluids to generate electricity from chemical compounds. nanoFlowcell uses, unlike the electrolytes in vanadium flow batteries or polysulfide bromide flow batteries, proprietary molecules as charge carriers; the electrolyte used in the nanoFlowcell is non-toxic and environmentally compatible. The electrolyte used in the nanoFlowcell battery has an energy density of 600 Wh per litre, which is ten times the energy density of regular redox flow cells. nanoFlowcell states that mass production cost for its "non-flammable and non-explosive" electrolyte is below 10 cents per litre.

The feasibility of nanoFlowcell's flow cell technologies has been questioned.

nanoFlowcell has registered offices in Kilchberg, Switzerland and London, United Kingdom. The company became a public limited company in 2021.

== QUANT Prototypes ==
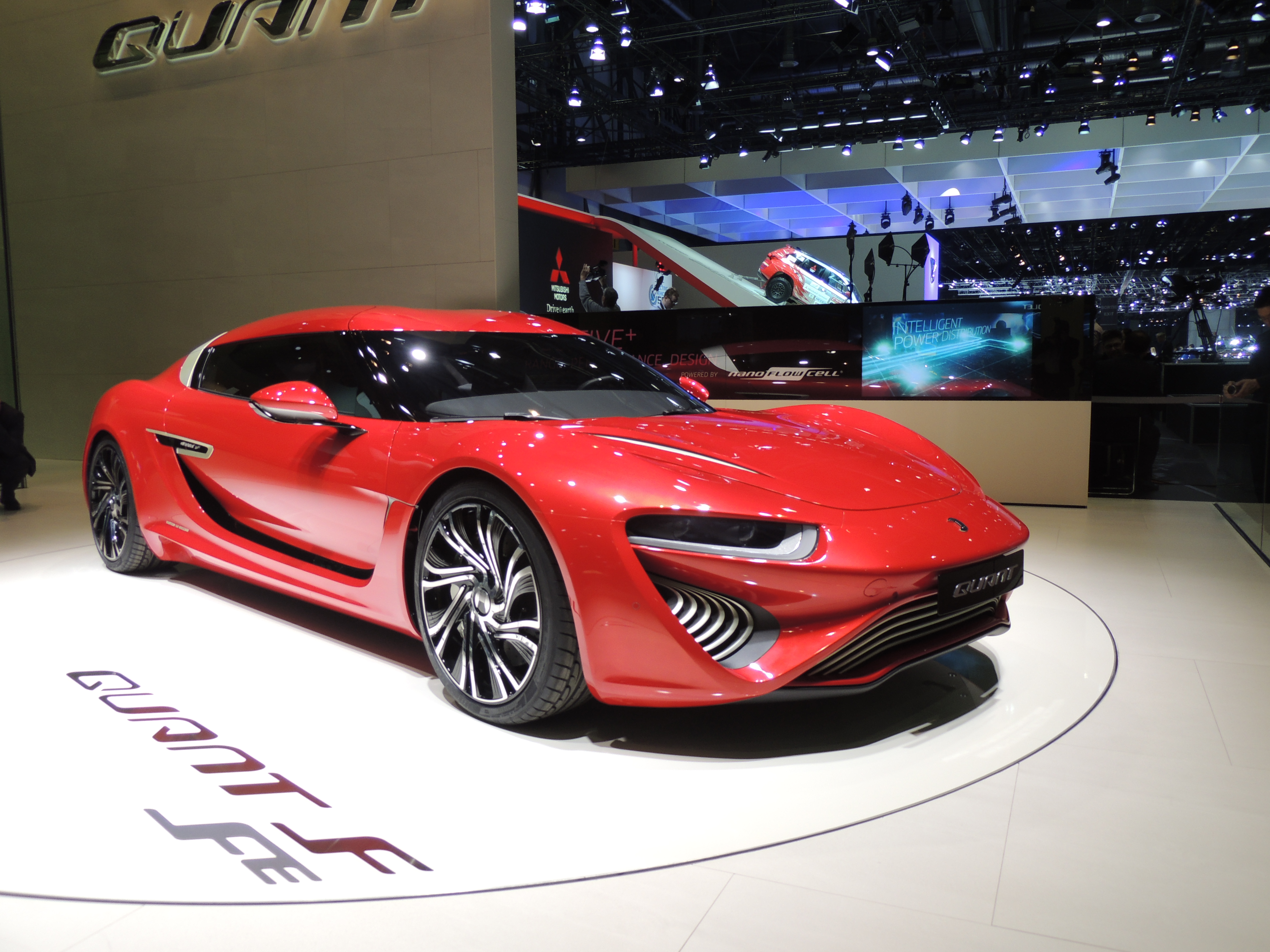
QUANT FE premiere at the 2016 Geneva International Motor Show

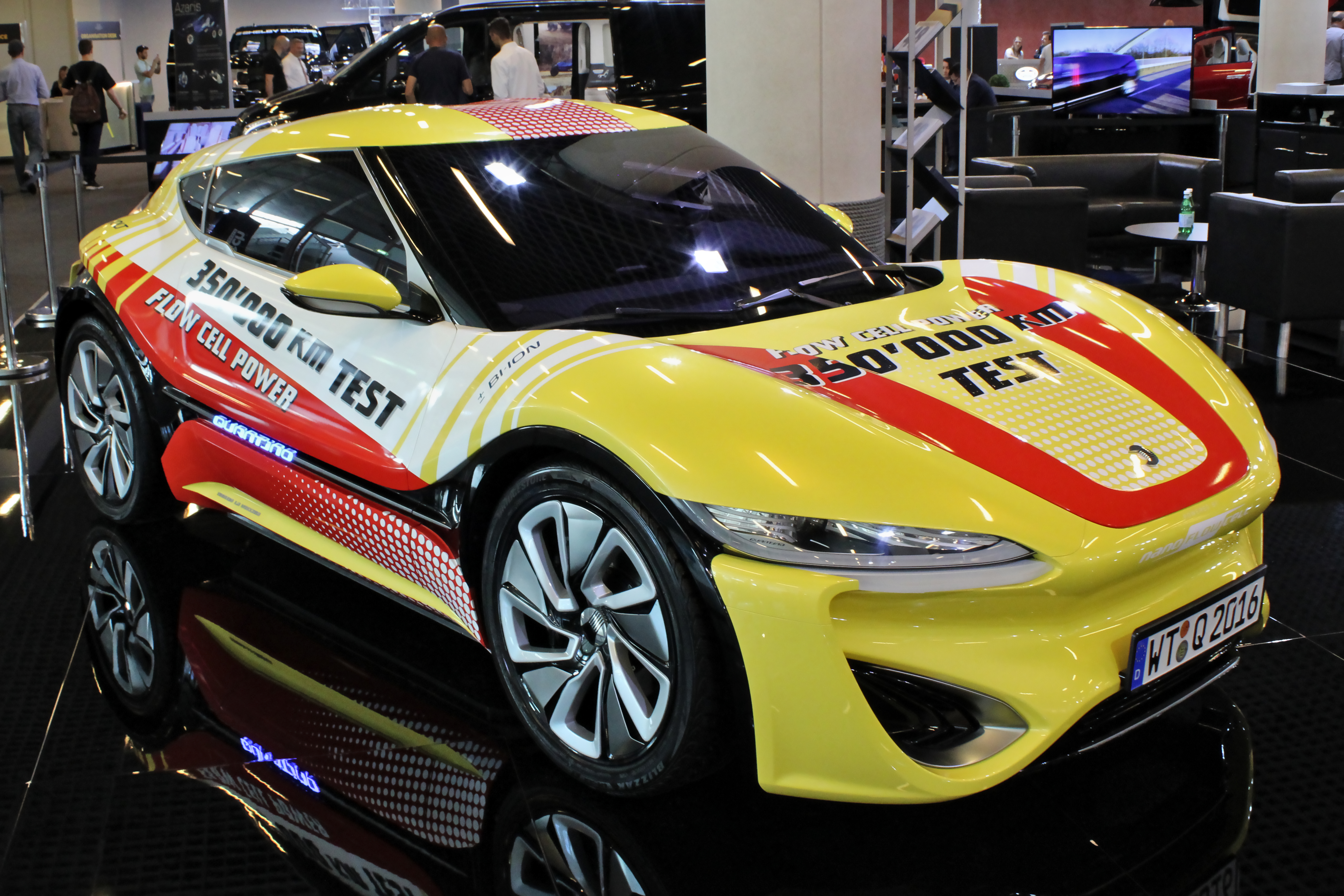
Quantino at the 2019 Top Marques Monaco

Under the name QUANT (derived from quantum mechanics), nanoFlowcell Holdings developed applications for its nanoFlowcell flow cell technology, mainly electric vehicles such as the QUANT E, QUANT FE and Quantino. The Quantino is the latest electric prototype vehicle produced by nanoFlowcell engineers for their battery testing purposes. The road-legal version of the Quantino was first introduced at the Geneva International Motor Show in 2016, together with its more powerful sibling QUANT FE. The QUANT name and design itself was previously used in the Koenigsegg Quant solar electric concept car, in which La Vecchia's previous venture, NLV Solar, was involved.

The Quantino and QUANT FE prototype vehicles have been used for technology presentations towards the automobile industry in 2016 to further demonstrate the use and advantages of flow cell technology in electric cars. Several journalists who drove Quantino and QUANT FE in public testings confirmed functionality of the nanoFlowcell's flow cell technology. nanoFlowcell claimed that the Quantino consumed 12 kWh per 100 km in a mixed test.

== bi-ION Electrolyte ==
Similar to regular modern redox flow cells, nanoFlowcell produces electricity from liquids. nanoFlowcell insists that the electrolyte solution is not common salt water as commonly stated in several internet forums and automotive press, claiming that the electrolyte solution they named bi-ION consist of a conductive liquid - organic and inorganic salts dissolved in water - and the electrolytes themselves, nano-structured molecules which are specific molecules designed by the company. While dissolved redox salts are responsible for the energy transfer in conventional redox flow batteries, the bi-ION electrolyte is stated to be an energy storage medium whose suspended nano-particles would have allowed a considerably higher energy density than regular redox electrolyte liquids.

== Controversy ==
European R&D institutes cast doubts over nanoFlowcell's technological progress with flow cells, while in the United States several R&D institutes announced their breakthrough with similar flow cell designs for electric vehicles. In a report, Top Gear stated that while American universities find nanoFlowcell's technology plausible, there are European institutions that are not convinced.

The Quant 48Volt delivers 560 kW at 48 V, with 140 kW going to each motor. This means the current going to each motor is equal to 2917 Amps which would heat up the cables dramatically. Porsche, by comparison, saved 66 pounds on the Taycan by going from 400 V to 800 V and is able to keep the motors cooler by going to higher voltages with greatly reduced currents.

According to a Jalopnik article, Dr. Stephen Granade points out that, at the time of writing, the energy density of the flow batteries would be 5 times that of Tesla's batteries with technology where the energy density is typically far lower.

In another controversy, the founder has previously been accused with defrauding an older lady by having her invest in non-existing solar panel technology, although he was acquitted.

== See also ==
- Ionic liquid
