= Mohs (automobile) =

Defunct American car brand

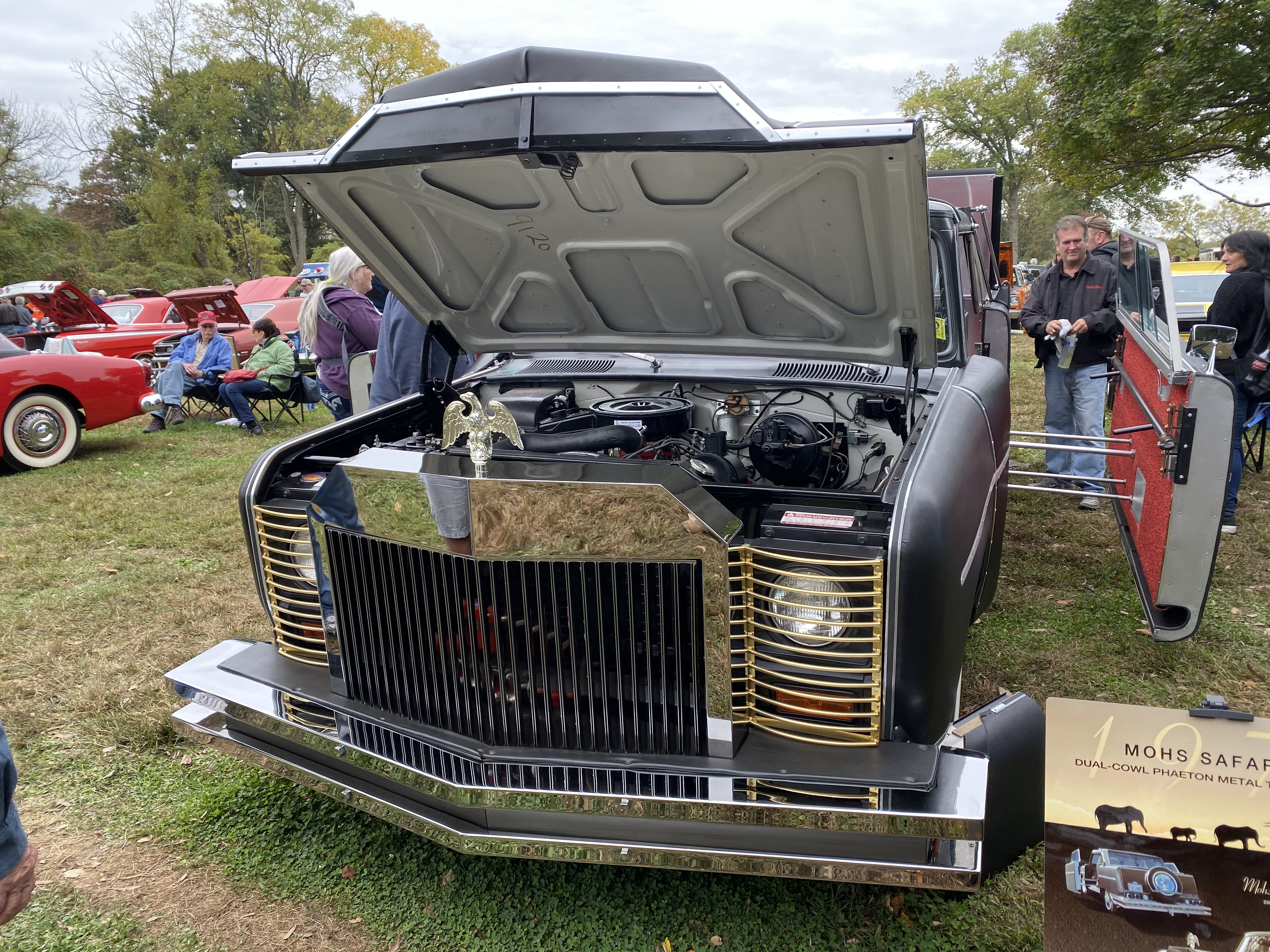
A Mohs SafariKar, photographed in 2019.

Mohs was an automobile make built by the Mohs Seaplane Corporation of Madison, Wisconsin (United States). Bruce Mohs, the company founder, built limited-production automobiles on chassis built to custom specifications by the International Harvester Company. Automobiles by Mohs were built between 1967 and 1979.

Mohs produced two models.

Bruce Baldwin Mohs died on February 1, 2015.

== Ostentatienne Opera Sedan ==
The Ostentatienne Opera Sedan was offered at a F.O.B. price of $19,600 (1967), with Mohs publicizing the same price in 1977. The car weighed 5,740 lb (2,600 kg), and sat on a 119 in (3.02 m) wheelbase. Length was 246 inches, height 89 inches, width 90 inches.Tires for the vehicle were nitrogen filled 7.50”x20” (USA). The Ostentatienne was powered by International Harvester's 304 cubic inch truck engine. Entry into the car was from the rear; solid steel side rails (designed to protect passengers during a crash) prevented doors along the vehicle's sides. The Ostentatienne could be ordered customized to suit its buyer’s wishes; Ming styled oriental rugs, refrigerators and sealed beam taillights were some of the options available. Production was reported to be three to four vehicles per year, only one was ever built.

=== Restoration ===
The Opera Sedan was restored in 2009 after sitting in storage for almost 20 years. It was Bruce Mohs' personal Opera Sedan. Bringing it back to its original condition by two Wisconsin High Schools: Freedom High School Automotive Program and the Freedom Auto Club (Freedom, WI) and Shawano High School automotive program known as "Hot Rod High" (Shawano, WI). A personal friend of Mr. Mohs, Fred Beyer coordinated the restoration and displayed it at the 2009 Iola Car Show in Iola, WI. FHS students along with instructor Jay Abitz and associate Bob Abitz spent 16 weeks and over 400 hours repairing rust, fabricating panels, and restoring the paint and body. Retired teacher Fred Beyer and Mike Carnahan along with the "Hot Rod High" students performed all of the dis-assembly, mechanical repairs, detailing, and re-assembly. Paint and materials were supplied by PPG and 3M. Mechanical parts by various suppliers. The Opera Sedan was featured in the August 09' issue of Hot Rod Magazine, February 2010 issue of Kustoms and Hot Rods, and both Freedom and Shawano High School annual Car Shows. The restored sedan was on display for almost a year at the Wisconsin Automotive Museum in Hartford, WI. The "Opera Sedan" is now featured along with the "SafariKar" at Wayne Lensing's Historic Auto Attractions museum located in Roscoe, Illinois.

== SafariKar ==
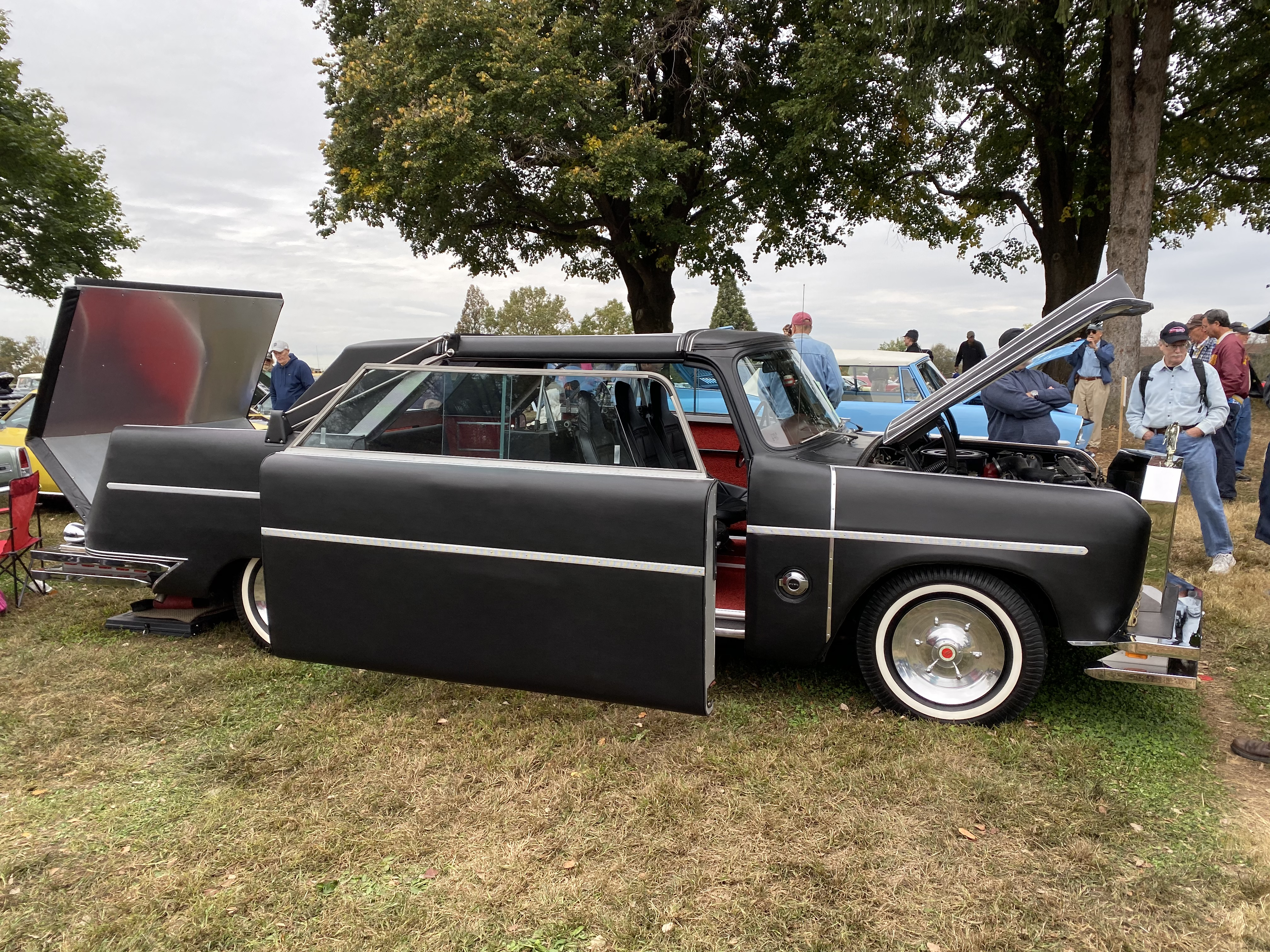
1973 Mohs SafariKar

The SafariKar was introduced in 1972. Built on an International Harvester chassis, the SafariKars featured an aluminum body. The exterior is upholstered in Naugahyde (vinyl) stretched over foam padding. Doors for the vehicle opened outward from the body on four linear rods, again for side impact protection.

The vehicle has a retractable hard top system and a fold-down bed in the rear. Options for the SafariKar included a television, four-wheel drive, two-way radio and "butane furnace." Only three were produced, probably all in 1972 since an early Mohs publicity photograph shows all three in various stages of assembly. "Production" of the Safari Kar was listed in several publications as late as 1979 although only the original three were built.
