= Nissan 126X =

1970 concept car

Overview
- Manufacturer: Nissan
- Production: 1970; 1 built

Body and chassis
- Class: Concept car
- Body style: Coupe
- Layout: Transversely mounted rear-engine, AWD
- Doors: Canopy

Powertrain
- Engine: 3.0 L L-series OHC I6
- Power output: 180 PS (132 kW)
- Transmission: 5-speed manual

Dimensions
- Wheelbase: 2,800 mm (110.2 in)
- Length: 4,890 mm (192.5 in)
- Width: 1,940 mm (76.4 in)
- Height: 1,135 mm (44.7 in)
- Curb weight: 1,601 kg (3,530 lb)

The Nissan 126X is a concept car built by Nissan in 1970.

== Design ==
The 126X features an angular, wedge design like many other concept cars of the time. It has a strip of lights along the hood that light up with either 3 red, 2 yellow, or 5 green lights depending on whether the vehicle is braking, at constant speed, or accelerating respectively. Similar strips were also included on the rear sides. It also features a front hinged canopy door that encompasses the roof, windscreen and the panels down to the sills. The car was controlled by airplane-inspired levers and also featured a backup camera.

== Specifications ==
The 126X is powered by a transverse-mounted Nissan L-series, 3.0-liter 6-cylinder engine sending power to all four wheels. There is, however, no evidence that the 126X was actually roadworthy. Despite its wedge design, the 126X was a four-seater.

== Nissan 126X in miniature ==
A model of the 126X, badged as the "Datsun 126X", was produced by Matchbox from 1973 to 1985, debuting as number 33 in their 1-75 series.
