= Montecarlo Rascasse =

Overview
- Manufacturer: Monte Carlo Automobile
- Production: 2013-

Body and chassis
- Class: Super car

The Montecarlo Rascasse (or just Rascasse) is a sports car manufactured By Monte Carlo Automobile.

== About ==
The Monte Carlo Rascasse has a 5.4-liter V-12 5500cc engine capable of producing 500 horsepower which was manufactured by BMW and featured in the Rolls Royce Silver Seraph. The engine can run both gasoline and petroleum.

The Rascasse price is rumored to be about €500,000 (or US$655,000) and there are only 15 cars currently produced.
