= Mazda RX-500 =

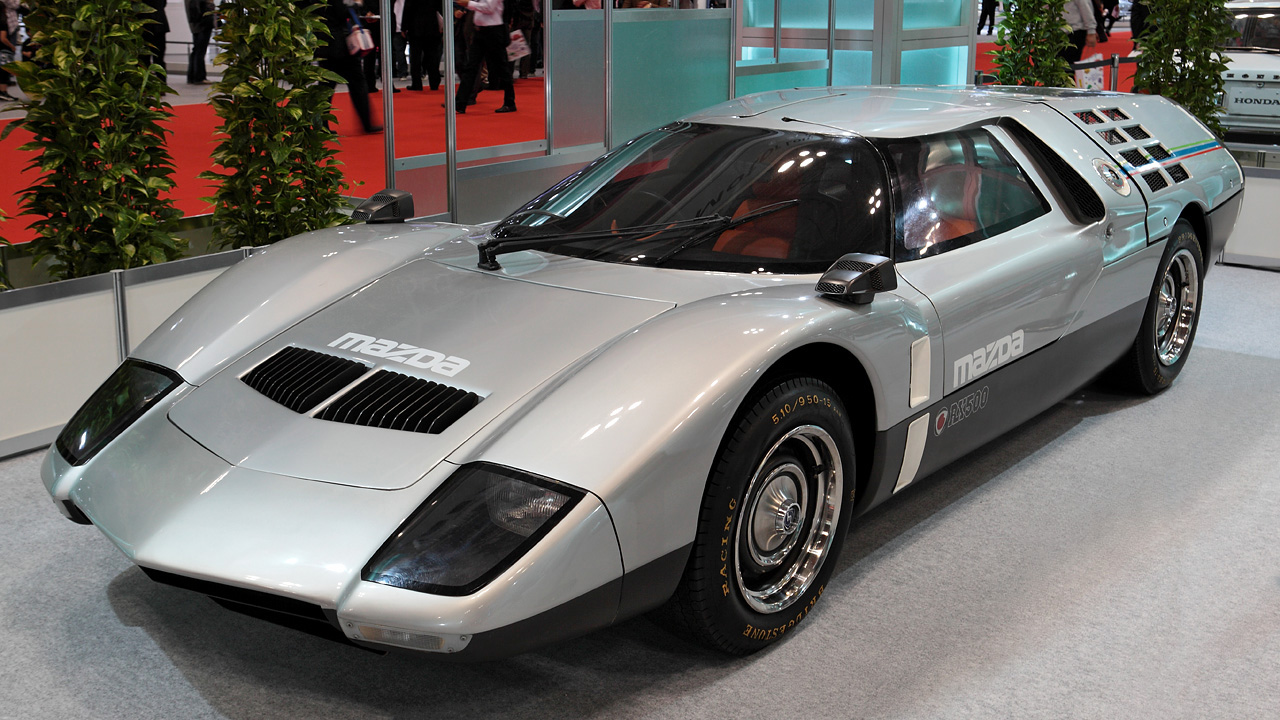
- RX-500 at the 2009 Tokyo Motor Show

Overview
- Manufacturer: Mazda
- Production: 1970

Body and chassis
- Class: Concept car
- Body style: 2-door coupé
- Layout: Rear mid-engine, rear-wheel-drive
- Doors: Butterfly (doors); Gullwing (engine compartment)

Powertrain
- Engine: 1.0 L (982 cc) twin-rotor 10A Wankel engine
- Transmission: 4-speed manual

Dimensions
- Wheelbase: 2,450 mm (96.5 in)
- Length: 4,330 mm (170.5 in)
- Width: 1,720 mm (67.7 in)
- Height: 1,065 mm (41.9 in)
- Kerb weight: 850 kg (1,874 lb)

The Mazda RX-500 is a mid-engine concept car developed by Japanese automobile manufacturer Mazda and first shown to the public at the 17th 1970 Tokyo Motor Show. It is a two-door coupé, accessed by forward-swinging butterfly-wing doors. The car received its name due to Mazda celebrating their 50th birthday.

The RX-500 was promoted as a mobile test bed for road safety, including multi-coloured lights at the rear which indicated whether the car was speeding up, braking or cruising. Braking was shown by red lights, cruising by amber lights and speeding up by green lights.

The car weighs 1,873 lb (850 kg) due to the use of lightweight plastic in its construction, and is powered by a 982 cc X 2 double-rotor (10A) Wankel engine that was mounted forward of the rear axle. The engine has a power output of 247 hp (184 kW; 250 PS). The engine is accessed via gull-wing doors. The car is capable of achieving a top speed of 150 mph (241 km/h).

It is sometimes implied that at least three cars were made, but the claim is not true. The sole example was originally painted orange at its first public appearance and lacked headlamps. It was later repainted silver and was stored in the Mazda factory. The car was restored for the 2009 Tokyo Motor Show and is now on display at Hiroshima City Transportation Museum. The car was also on display at the Goodwood Festival of Speed in the UK in 2014.

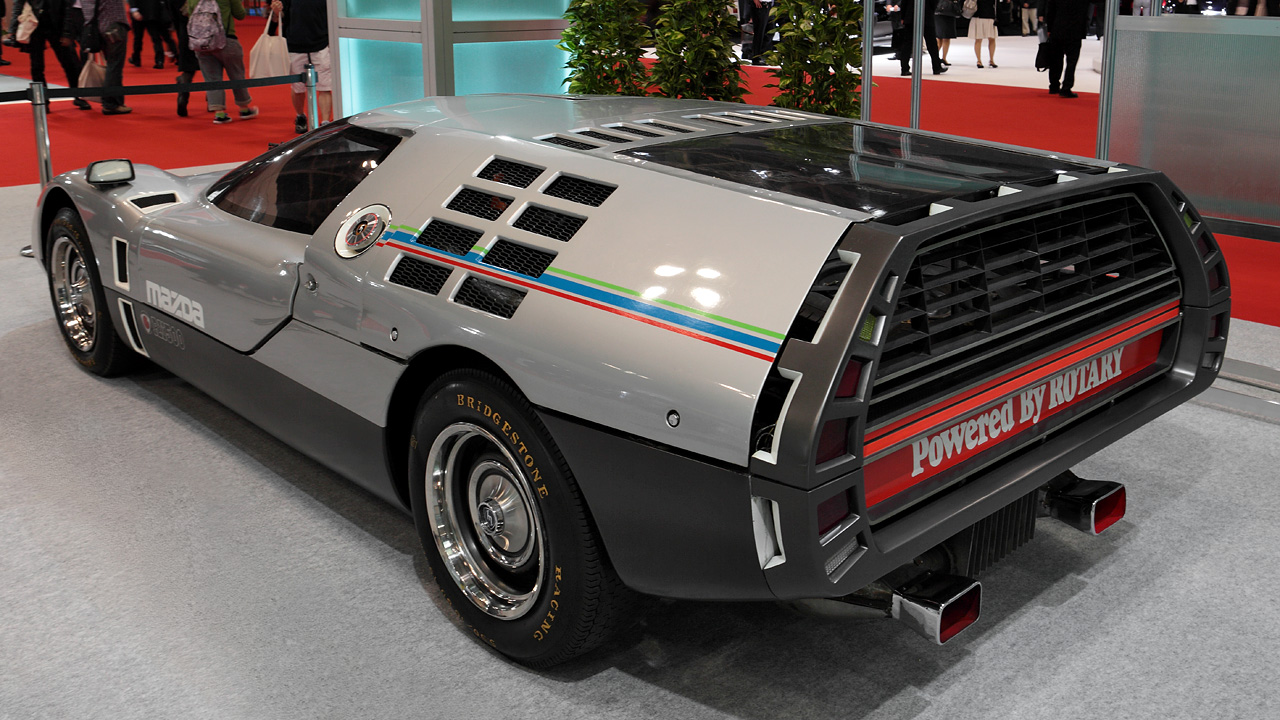
Rear view; the tail lights are used to indicate the speed of the car.
