= Nissan Sway =

2015 concept car

The Nissan Sway is a hatchback concept car exhibited by Nissan Motors in 2015 at the Geneva Motor Show. The car's dimensions are 401 cm (158 in) in length, 178 cm (70 in) in width, and 140 cm (55 in) in height, with a 257 cm (101 in) wheelbase.

The car features Nissan's V-motion grille, boomerang tail-lamps, floating roof design and glass roof with 'X' crossing structure in the middle. The dashboard of Nissan Sway was inspired by the Nissan IDx concept.

Nissan Sway concept
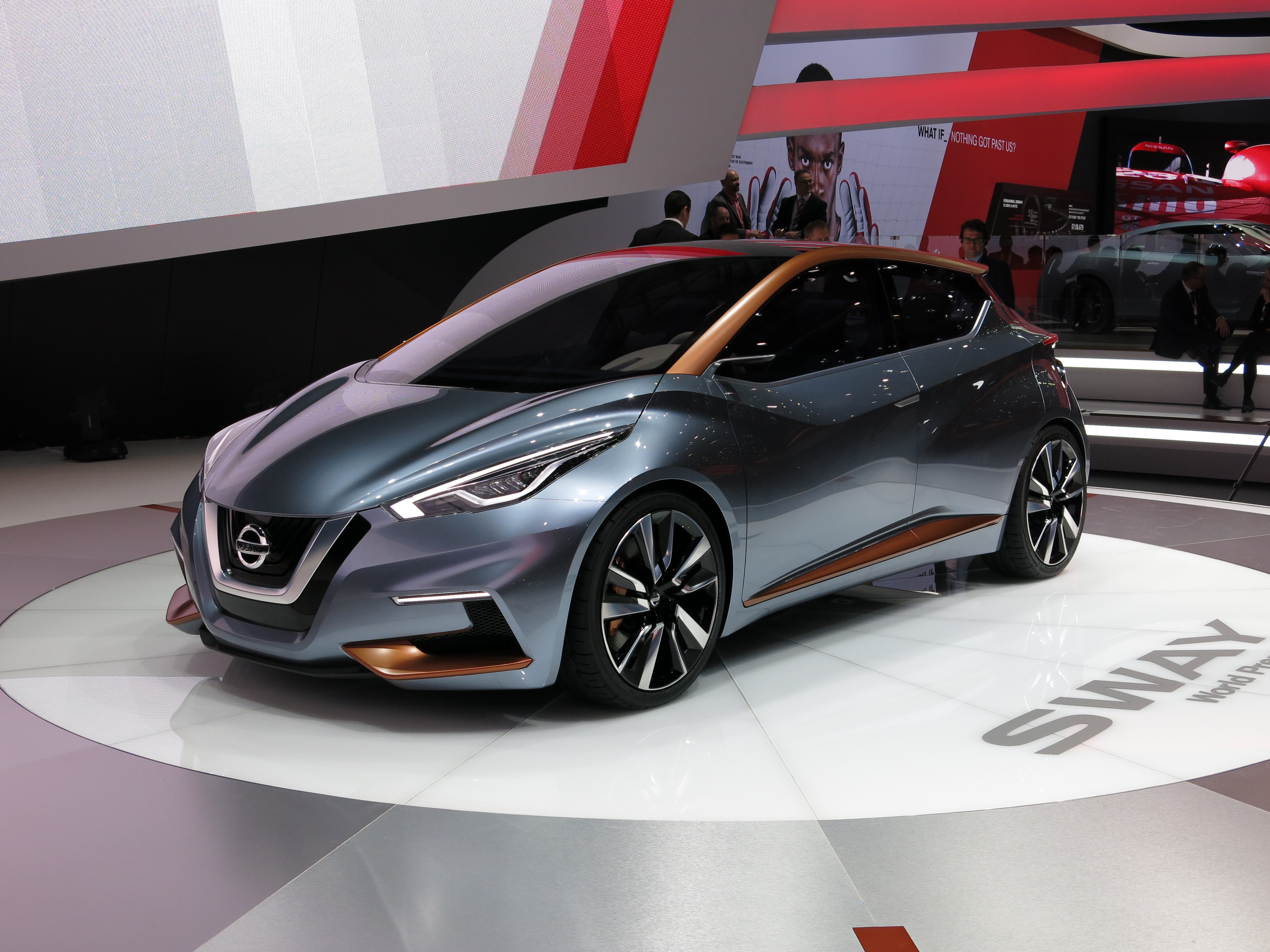
1/4 front view

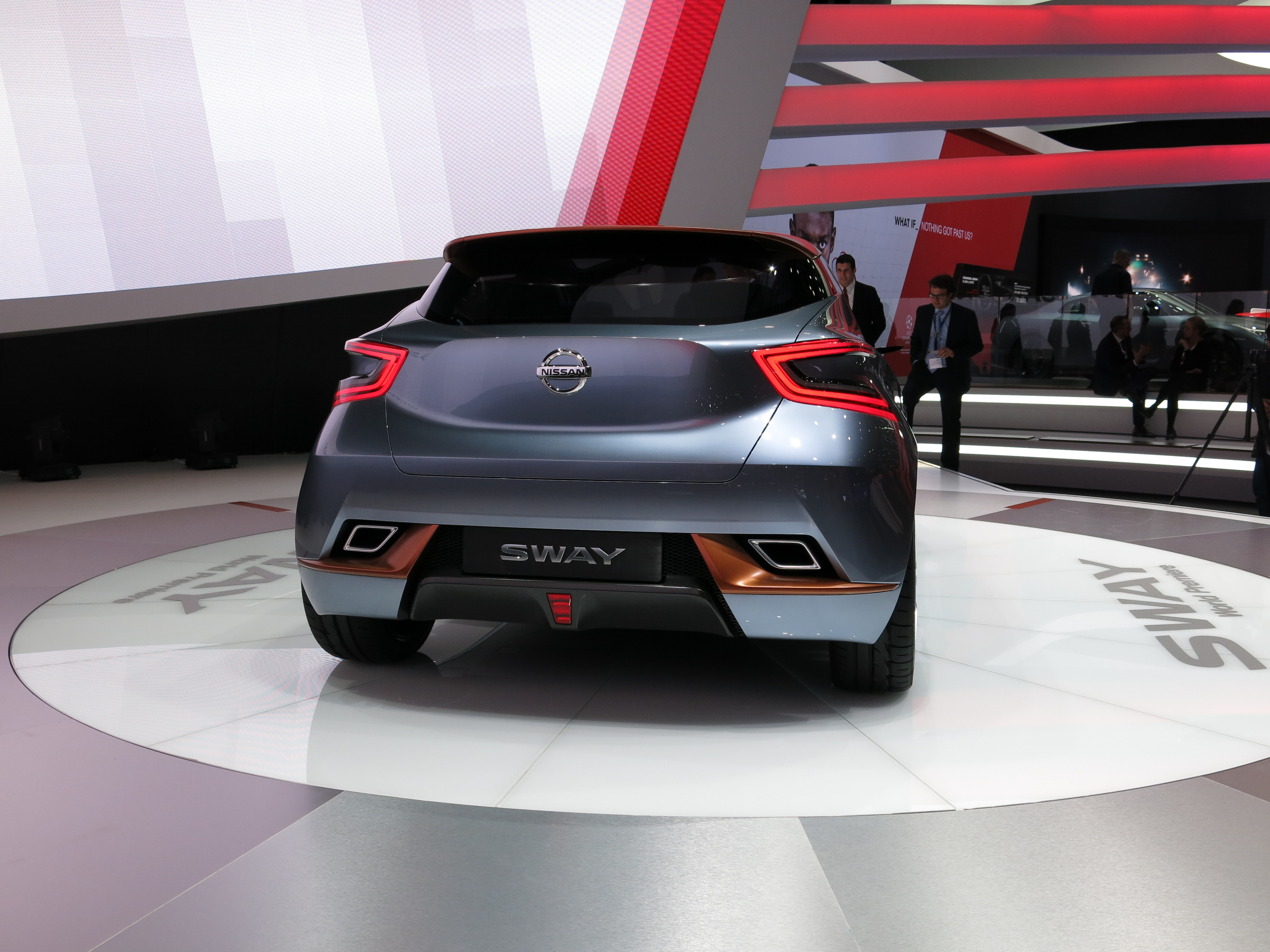
Back

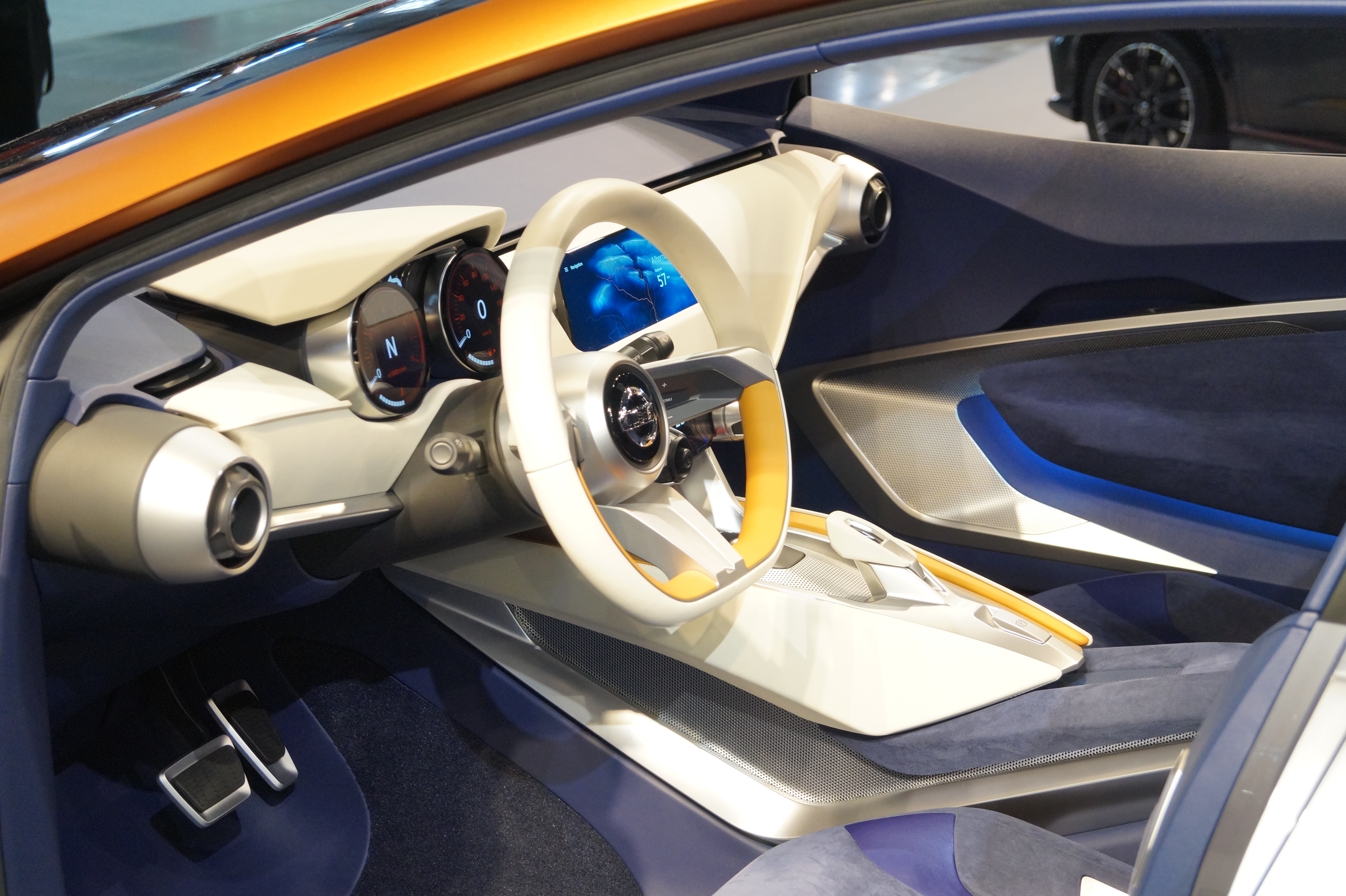
Interior
