= Kepler Motion =

- A Kepler Motion at SEMA 2013

Overview
- Manufacturer: Kepler Motors
- Production: c.2009

Body and chassis
- Class: Sports car (S)
- Body style: 2-door coupe

Powertrain
- Engine: 3.5 L twin-turbocharged Ford EcoBoost V6
- Electric motor: 2x Remy electric motors

The Kepler Motion (stylized as MOTION) is a sports car manufactured by Kepler Motors.

The Kepler Motion has a 550 hp (410 kW) V6 engine driving the rear side and two electric motors (combined 250 hp; 190 kW) driving the front. The motion can drive up to 60 mph (97 km/h) in 2.5 seconds and has a top speed of 200 mph (320 km/h). The monocoque body and chassis is made from carbon fiber composites and features continuous carbon ceramic brake rotors, active suspension and active aerodynamics. It has a 7-speed paddle shift, dual clutch transmission. The wheels are four-piece carbon fiber and aluminum – 19-inch at the front and 20-inch at the rear.

The engine is based on the 3.5 liter Ford EcoBoost engine and produces 575 ft⋅lb (780 N⋅m) of torque. The V6 engine powers the rear wheels only and the front wheels are powered by the electric motors only.

The principal source of capital for producing the car was Jonathan Lim, founder of the Romar Group in Singapore.

Many parts were made with the help of the CRP Group.

== Kepler 17B ==
A track-only version based on the same body and chassis was sold as the Kepler 17B. The drivetrain was increased to 1,009 hp (752 kW), with the electric motors supplying 303 hp (226 kW) and the V6 supplying 706 hp (526 kW). It used an F1 KERS battery pack and a 6-speed automated manual magnesium gearbox. Only 10 cars were planned.
