= Volvo Concept You =

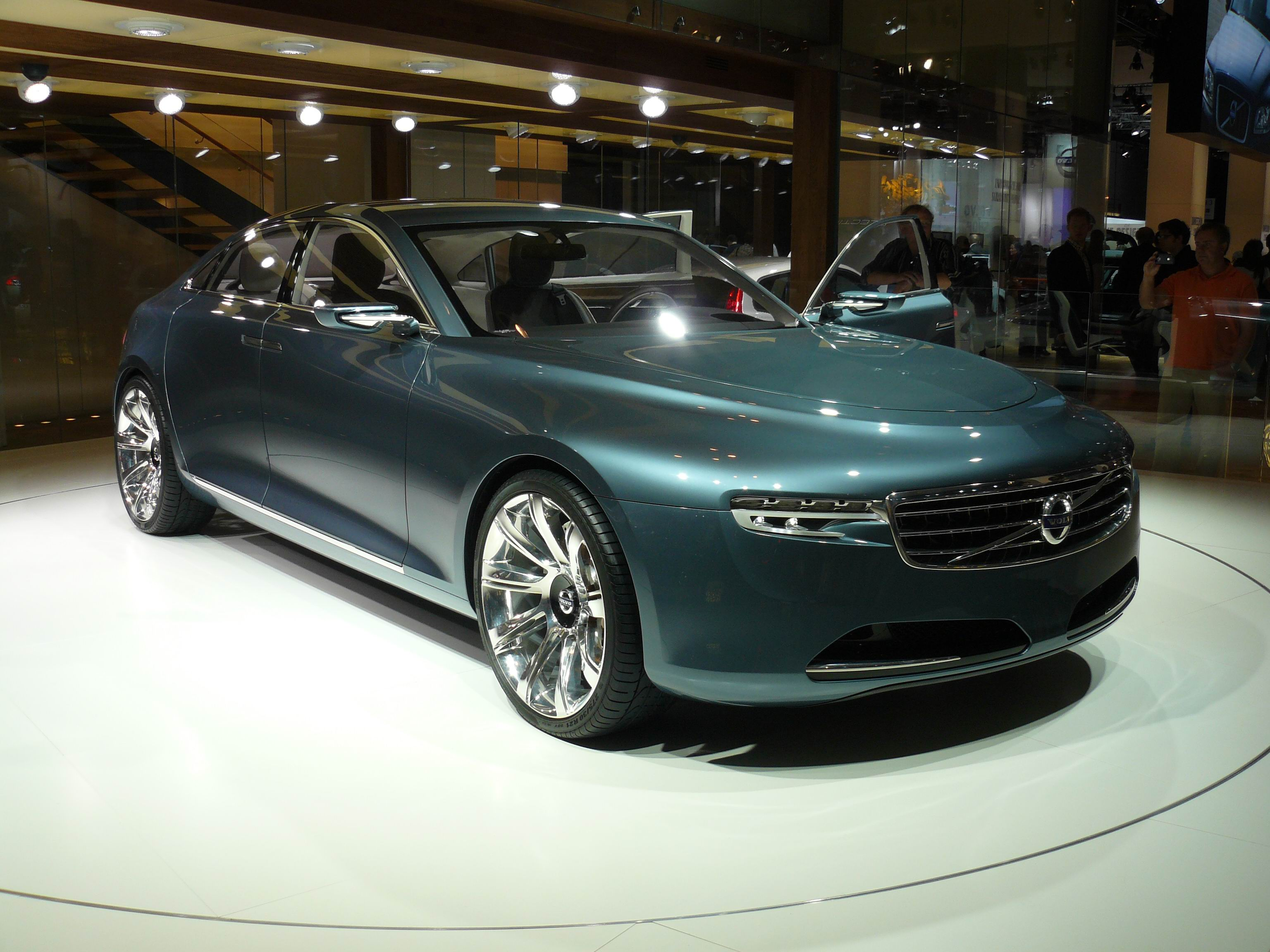

Overview
- Manufacturer: Volvo Cars
- Also called: Volvo Concept Universe
- Production: 2011 (Concept car)
- Designer: Jonathan Disley

Body and chassis
- Class: Executive car (E)
- Body style: 4-door fastback saloon (Concept You); 4-door saloon (Concept Universe)
- Layout: Front-engine, rear-wheel-drive
- Related: Volvo S80; Volvo V70

Powertrain
- Engine: 3.0 L turbocharged V6 (Concept You); 3.0 L turbocharged V8 (Concept Universe)
- Transmission: 6-speed automatic (Concept You); 6-speed manual (Concept Universe)

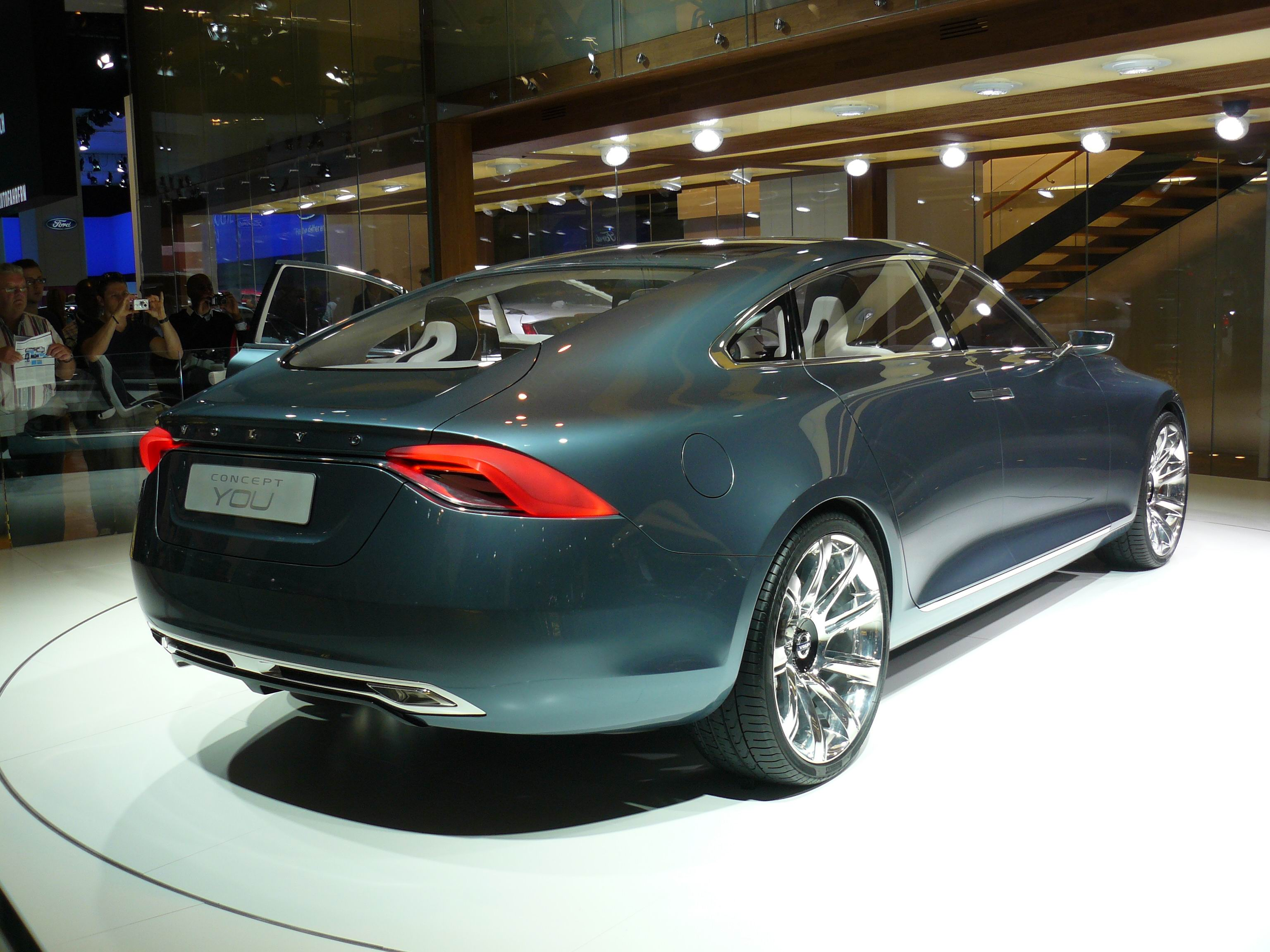
Volvo You Concept (Frankfurt 2011)

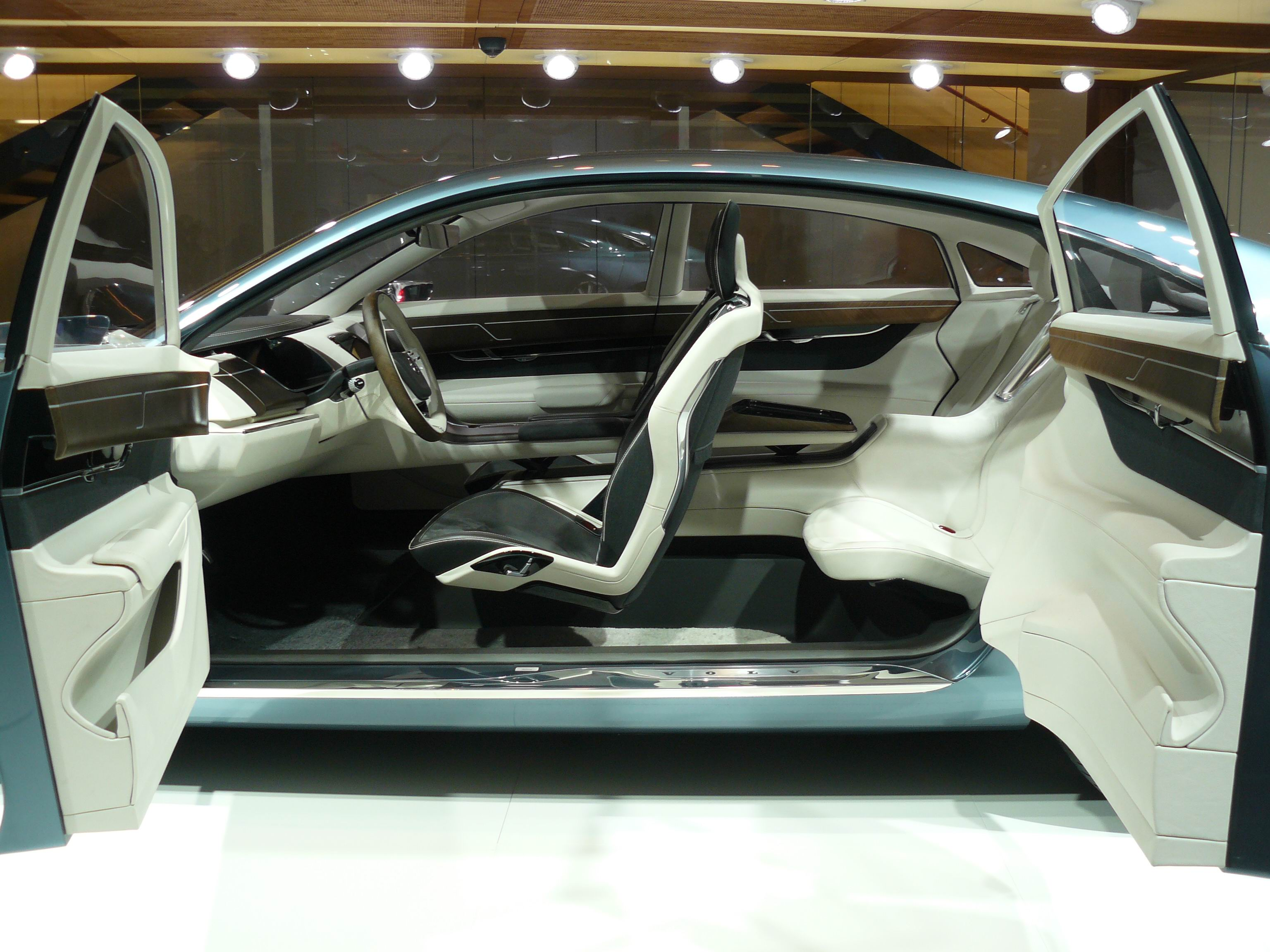
Volvo You Concept (Frankfurt 2011)

The Volvo Concept You is a concept car unveiled by Volvo at the 2011 Shanghai Auto Show.

The Concept You is an executive car with a four-door fastback saloon styling and is a development of the Volvo Concept Universe, which was revealed earlier in 2011. The design builds upon Scandinavian Design. Volvo designed the car around the driver and passengers, hence the name You. This includes, for example, the removal of all buttons and knobs, which were replaced by a touch screen to control the car's features.

The exterior design was inspired by classical Volvo models such as the PV544 and the Amazon.
