= Commander (disambiguation) =

Commander is a military rank.

Commander or Commanders may also refer to:

- Leader, a leader of people

== Computers and games ==
- Commander (computing), a file manager primarily with a list/detail view
- BCT Commander, a 2002 computer wargame developed by ProSIM Company and published by Shrapnel Games
- Commander: Europe at War, a 2007 computer wargame by Slitherine Software
- Magic: The Gathering Commander, a gameplay format in Magic: the Gathering
- Important units in Total Annihilation and Supreme Commander

== Military ==
=== United States ===
- Commander (United States), a military rank that is also sometimes used as a military billet title
- Commander, Naval Forces Vietnam, a command of the United States Navy, active from 1 April 1966 to 29 March 1973
- Commander, Naval Surface Forces Pacific, a United States Navy admiral, who leads the Naval Surface Force, United States Pacific Fleet
- Commander, Navy Installations Command, an Echelon II shore command responsible for all shore installations under the control of the United States Navy
- Commander, Navy Region Mid-Atlantic, one of eleven current naval regions responsible to Commander, Navy Installations Command
- Commander, Strike Force Training Pacific, part of the U.S. Third Fleet
- Commander, U.S. Pacific Fleet, the title of the Navy officer who commands the United States Pacific Fleet

=== Other military ===
- Base commander, the officer assigned to command a military base
- Commander (Canada), an officer in the Royal Canadian Navy
- Commander (Merchant navy) or chief mate, head of the deck department of a merchant ship
- Commander (Royal Navy), a senior officer rank of the Royal Navy of the United Kingdom
- Commander Dante (born 1944), who became military leader of the New People's Army in the Philippines in October 1970 during the First Quarter Storm
- Commanding officer, the officer in command of a military unit
- Seti (commander), an ancient Egyptian soldier during the late 18th dynasty (14th century BCE)

== Arts and entertainment ==
- Cobra Commander, fictional character in the G.I. Joe: A Real American Hero franchise
- "Commander" (song), a 2010 song by Kelly Rowland
- Commander (film), a 1981 Hindi-language action drama film
- The Commander (TV series), crime drama series by Lynda La Plante
- Commander (Star Trek), an officer in the TV series Star Trek
- The Commanders, American TV series

== Natural sciences ==
- Commander butterflies, the brush-footed butterfly genera Moduza
  - Commander, common name for the brush-footed butterfly Moduza procris

== Sports ==
- Washington Commanders, American football team in the National Football League (NFL)
- San Antonio Commanders, Alliance of American Football team

== Transportation ==
- Air Command Commander, an autogyro
- Chris-Craft Commander, a motorboat
- Studebaker Commander, an automobile
- Jeep Commander, an automobile nameplate used for several Jeep models
- Wright Commander, a bus bodywork for the DAF SB200 chassis from Wrightbus
- Commander Air Charter (ICAO code CML), out of Canada
- Commander Mexicana (ICAO code CRM), out of Mexico

== Other ==
- Commander, a large, heavy mallet used in timber framing, also called a beetle
- Commander (dog) (born 2021), dog of U.S. President Joe Biden
- Commander (knife), a recurve bladed folding knife made by Emerson Knives
- Commander (order), a title of honor prevalent in chivalric order and fraternal orders
- Commander Australia, an Australian telecommunications company
- Commander Islands, a group of treeless, sparsely populated Russian islands located east of the Kamchatka

== See also ==
- Commander Cody (disambiguation)
- Commander Evans (disambiguation)
- Commander in Chief (disambiguation)
- Comandante (disambiguation)
- Commendatore (disambiguation)
