= Isdera Commendatore =

Isdera Commendatore can refer to two motor vehicles manufactured by Isdera:

- Isdera Commendatore 112i (1993–1999)
- Isdera Commendatore GT (2018–present)
