= Mercedes-Benz C112 =

1991 mid-engine concept car

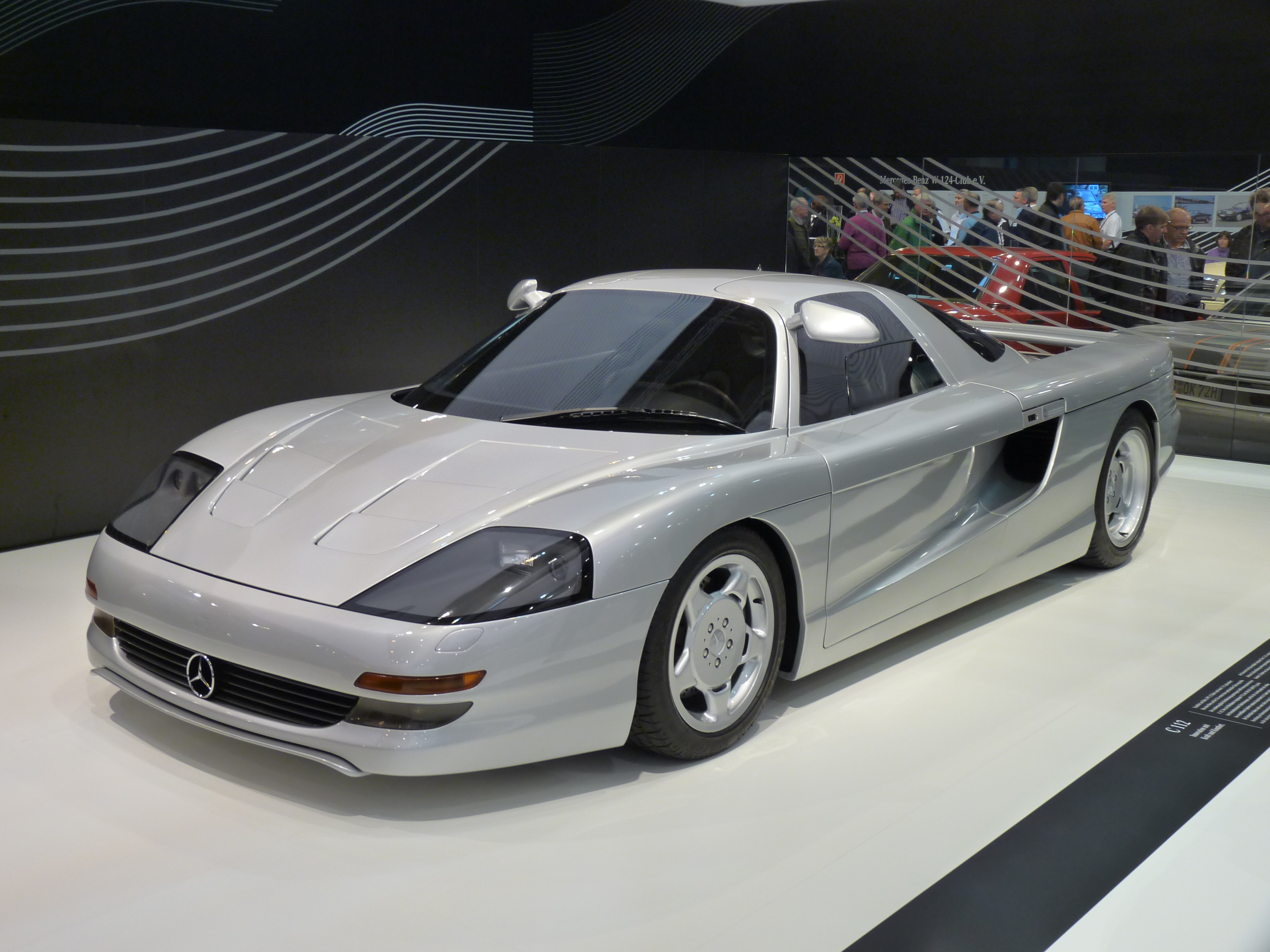

Overview
- Manufacturer: Carrozzeria Coggiola (body); Daimler-Benz (chassis and interior)
- Production: 1991
- Assembly: Italy: Turin
- Designer: Mercedes-Benz Advanced Design team under Bruno Sacco

Body and chassis
- Class: Concept car
- Body style: 2-door coupé
- Layout: Rear mid-engine, rear-wheel-drive
- Platform: Riveted aluminium and Kevlar body panels over bonded aluminium monocoque with integrated steel roll cage
- Doors: Gull-wing
- Related: Mercedes-Benz C11; Isdera Commendatore 112i

Powertrain
- Engine: 6.0-litre Mercedes-Benz M120 60-degree V12
- Transmission: 6-speed manual

Dimensions
- Wheelbase: 2,700 mm (106.3 in)
- Length: 4,616 mm (182 in)
- Width: 1,976 mm (78 in)
- Height: 1,200 mm (47 in)
- Curb weight: 1,569 kg (3,459 lb)

Chronology
- Predecessor: Mercedes-Benz C111 (spiritual); Mercedes-Benz CW311
- Successor: Isdera Commendatore 112i Mercedes-Benz CLK GTR; Lotec C1000

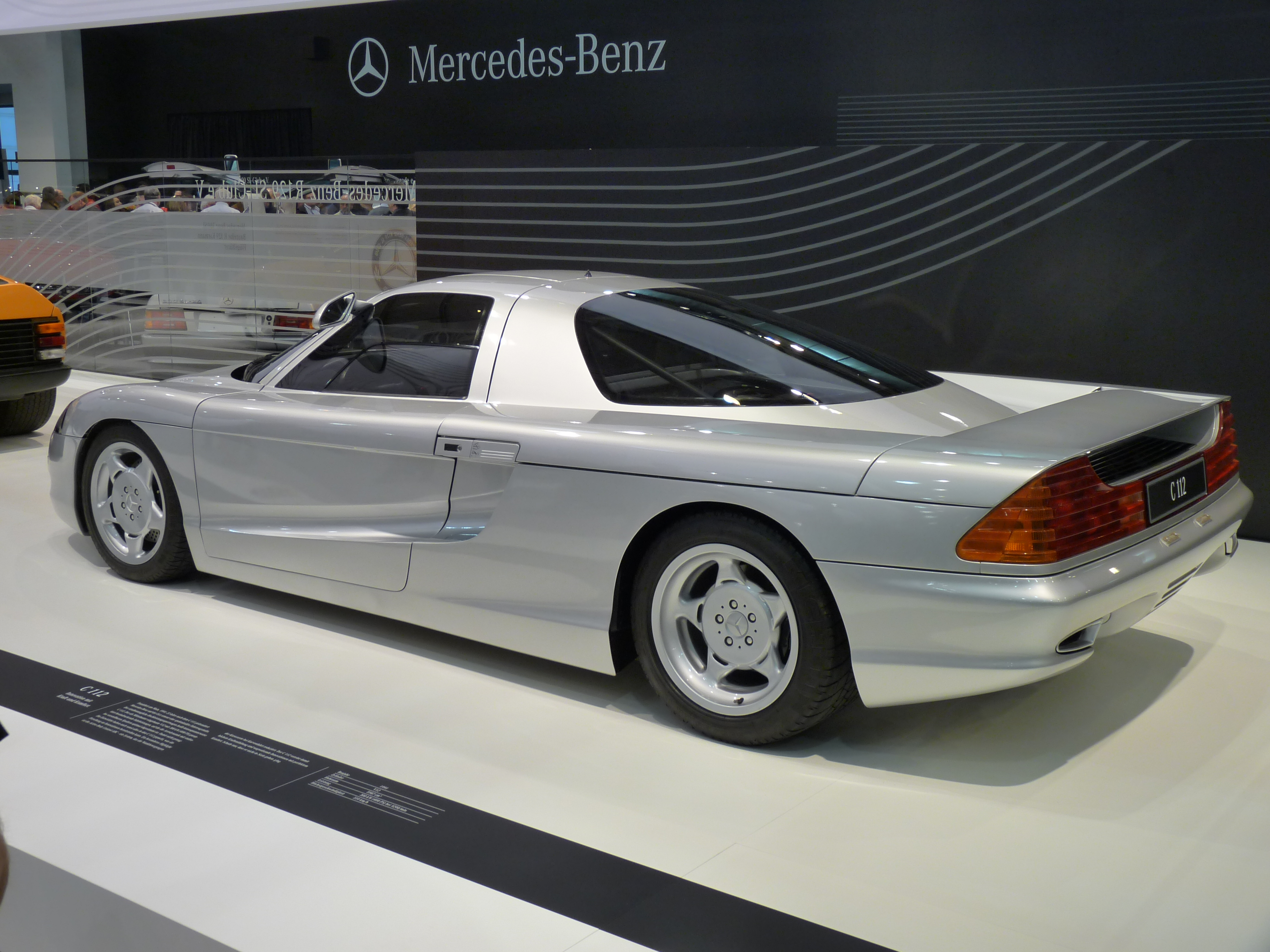
Mercedes-Benz C112

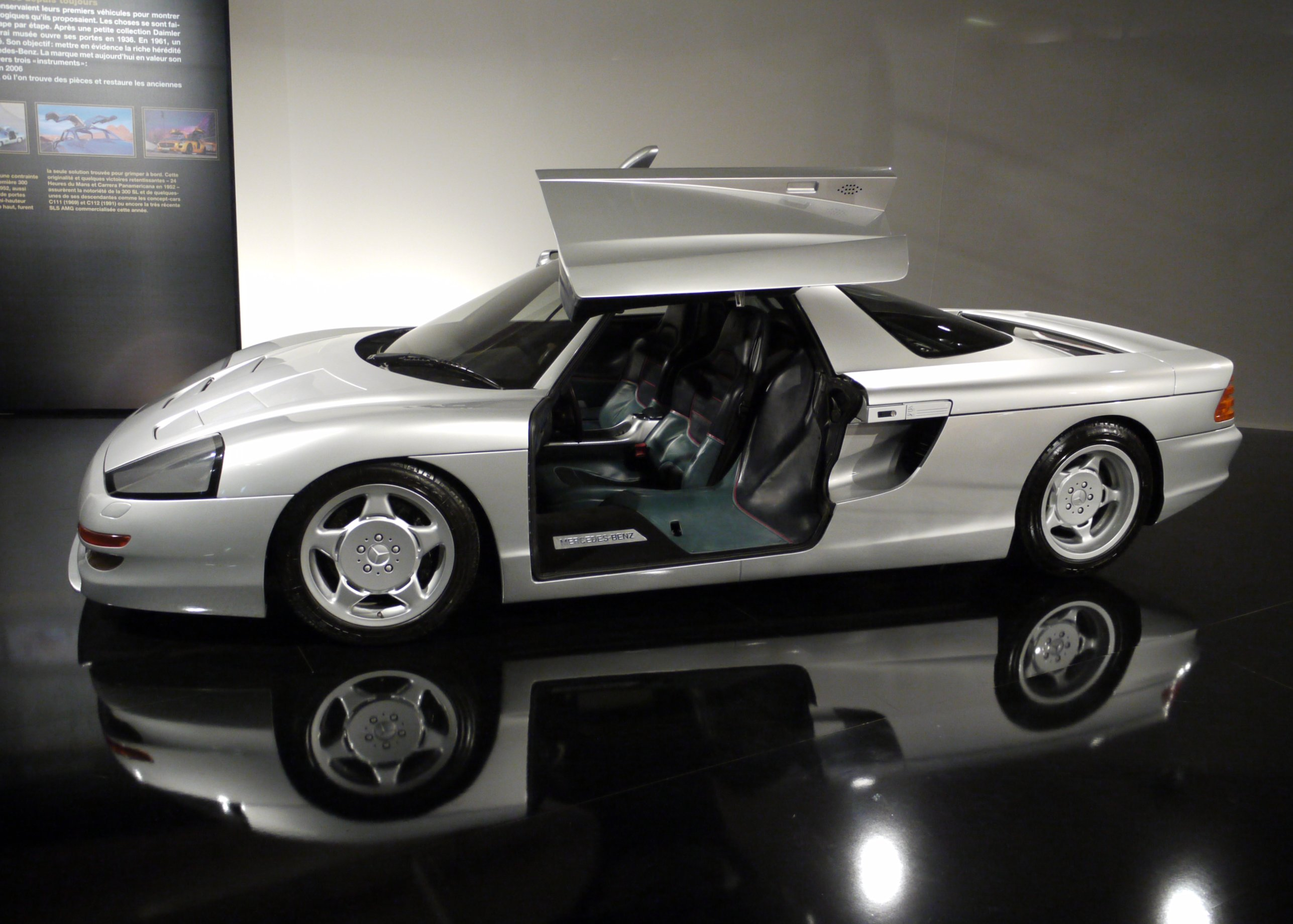
C112 with gullwing doors open.

The Mercedes-Benz C112 is an experimental mid-engine concept car built in 1991 by German automobile manufacturer Mercedes-Benz as a test bed, similar to the later versions of the C111. Despite using the same chassis code, it was not related to the W112 series of limousines and coupes of the 1960s. The C112 was intended to be the road-legal counterpart of the Sauber-built C11 Group C prototype race car developed for the 1990 World Sports-Prototype Championship.

== Features and specifications ==
The C112 was equipped with the new 6.0-litre (5,987cc) M120 V12 engine, with peak power of 300 kW (408 PS; 402 hp) and peak torque of 580 N⋅m (428 lb⋅ft). The body was built by the Italian coach builder Carrozzeria Coggiola on the chassis supplied by Mercedes-Benz. The use of pop-up headlamps, a common feature on sports cars at that time, was avoided as it increased drag and created aerodynamic turbulence. Instead, two fixed units with clear lenses and transparent fairings were used while the fog lamps and indicator lamps were integrated into the front bumper, which itself was made from Kevlar. An electronically controlled front spoiler was integrated into the funnel-shaped underwing inlet located under the front bumper's air-intake. A notable feature of the car were the gullwing doors, giving a nod to the iconic 300 SL. Door opening was servo-assisted by hydraulic cylinders positioned under the roof. The doors were designed in such a way that they could be bent open in case of a roll-over. The rear body work consisted of a simple hinged engine cover atop the riveted aluminium panels that allowed for easier repair work, a massive tail lamp array along with Kevlar venturi tunnels and a smooth rear bumper with integrated exhaust tips completed the rear look. In order to keep the aerodynamic drag low, only three air-inlets were utilised: one in each flank in addition to that integrated into the nose. The flank intakes supplied air to the engine bay through a radiator which cooled the engine oil, while a portion of the air was channelled to the rear brakes. The nose inlet supplied air to the front brakes and to the water radiator. A smooth aerodynamic body along with the use of wing mirrors mounted on the A-pillar gave the car a drag co-efficient of 0.30, the lowest ever on a sports car at that time. The front spoiler and the rear wing controlled the lift generated due to the low drag coefficient. A lightweight bonded aluminium chassis weighing 130 lb (59 kg) was utilised, strengthened by a tubular steel sub-frame for the doors and the roof, this measure also increased rigidity. The 6-speed manual transmission transferring power to the rear wheels was specially developed for the C112 by Mercedes-Benz. The suspension system was a multi-link unit utilised from the Mercedes-Benz 190-series. The special 5-spoke magnesium wheels were built by Speedline and measured 18-inches at the front and rear, wrapped in tyres supplied by Goodyear and Michelin. The brakes were ventilated cast iron units with four-piston callipers at the front and rear supplied by Brembo. Other features included a luxurious leather interior carried over from the S-class, air-conditioning, heated adjustable leather seats, climate control, GPS navigation system, power steering, ABS brakes, electronic rear-wheel steering dubbed the 'cybernetic' steering (a novelty at that time) and a Becker 2000 Mexico cassette radio. The major systems demonstrated in the car were:

Active Body Control

Active Body Control was designed to control the vehicle's stability through a combination of active springs and hydraulics at each wheel, plus sensors that monitor the vehicle's movements. The vehicle's computer assesses the information from the sensors and adjusts the suspension accordingly.

Other systems

The most recent updates in anti-locking braking (ABS) and anti-skid control system (ASR) which split the braking pressure between the front and rear wheels

Active Aerodynamics

This was provided through the car's front spoiler and rear wing, which were electronically controlled to ensure the optimal combination of low drag and high downforce. The rear wing was also used to improve the car's braking in emergency situations although this was not seen in production until the Mercedes-Benz SLR McLaren.

Even though Mercedes-Benz received 700 orders for the car, it never went into production as it was determined by Mercedes-Benz executives that a flagship car wasn't needed to increase the attention drawn to the brand from its motorsport successes.

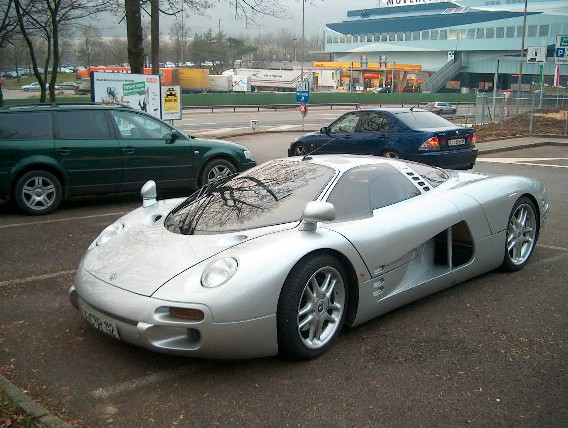
Isdera Commendatore 112i

The similar Isdera Commendatore 112i was built in nearby Leonberg, also using the Mercedes V12 powerplant, gullwing doors, but Porsche-like headlights.

== Performance ==
The C112 could theoretically accelerate from 0–100 km/h (0–62 mph) in 4.9 seconds and could reach a maximum speed of 309 km/h (192 mph). At its maximum speed, the C112 was claimed to generate a downforce of 998 kg (2,200 lb). These performance figures were never tested as the car was never driven.

== Bibliography ==
- Mercedes-Benz C112 Experimental
