= Commendatore =

Commendatore or Commendatoré (singular), Commendatori (plural), is an Italian word originating from the Latin phrase In commendam and meaning "Commander". It may refer to:

== Position, rank, title ==
- Commander (order) (Italian: Commendatore), the title of honour "Commander"
  - Commendatore of the Italian Republic (Italian: Commendatore della Repubblica), rank in an order of honour
- Commander (military), the military rank, using the affectation of Italian wording for illicit forces
- Leader (person in command), a leader of a group of people, using the affectation of Italian wording for an aura of respect

== People ==
- Il Commendatore, nickname for Enzo Ferrari

=== Fictional characters ===
- Il Commendatore (transl. Commendatore; a.k.a. Don Pedro), a character in the Mozart opera Don Giovanni

== Arts and entertainment ==
- Killing Commendatore A 2017 novel written by Japanese writer Haruki Murakami
- Il Commendatore (sculpture), a statue in Prague
- Commendatori (TV episode) 2000 television episode of The Sopranos

== Other uses ==
- Isdera Commendatore, the "Commendatore", a car model manufactured by Isdera
- Palazzo del Commendatore, Rome (Italian: Commander's Palace; Palace of the Knight Commander; transl. Commendatore), a building in Rome
  - Salon del Commendatore (Italian: Commander's Room; Room of the Knight Commander; transl. Commendatore), inside the palace Palazzo del Commendatore, Rome

== See also ==
- Commander (disambiguation)
