= Galactic Commander =

Galactic Commander may refer to:

- Galactic Commander, a video game published by Micro Power
- Galactic Commander, a video game character from the Blaster Learning System videogame series
- Galactic Commander of the Planet Pylon, a fictional character from the TV show Comedy! Bang! Bang! portrayed by Kevin McDonald

== See also ==
- Galaxy Commander, a fictional rank in BattleTech; BattleTech: The Animated Series, and BattleTech novels
- a commander for Team Galactic in Pokémon
- a commander for the Galactic Empire (Star Wars)
- a commander for Virgin Galactic spaceline
- Galactic (disambiguation)
- Commander (disambiguation)
