= Car-napping =

1980 German crime comedy film

- Film poster
- Directed by: Wigbert Wicker
- Written by: Hans Drawe, Günter Peis
- Produced by: Lothar H. Krischer
- Starring: Bernd Stephan; Anny Duperey; Adrian Hoven
- Cinematography: Gernot Roll
- Music by: Sam Spence
- Production companies: Terra-Filmkunst; Dieter Geissler Filmproduktion; Hessischer Rundfunk (HR)
- Release date: 1980
- Running time: 85 minutes
- Country: Germany
- Language: German

Car-napping is a German comedy about international car thieves from 1980 with Bernd Stephan and Anny Duperey.

== Plot ==
On returning from an extended vacation, designer Robert Mehring learns to his complete surprise that the company he used to work for does not exist anymore. The owner of the business, Benninger, has secretly liquidated it and fled abroad with Mehrings drafts. Mehring locates Benninger on the Côte d'Azur and confronts him – without any success.

Later Mehring realizes that his Porsche 911 was stolen, including all his papers. The local police chief makes it clear that Mehring can't expect any help from the authorities. A short time later Mehring discovers his car in traffic and confronts the thieves, two Italians named Carlo and Mario, as they want to sell the 911 to a dealer. In return for not being reported to the police, the car thieves offer their cooperation. At first Mehring declines, but after learning that his former boss Benninger owns a car dealership in Paris with 40 Porsches, Mehring accepts the offer of Carlo and Mario. With the help of other chums, they steal all 40 cars in a single night and sell them.

Mehring becomes the head of the "Carnappers" stealing luxury vehicles on order. The crew includes the printer Herrmann Aichinger who was also a victim of Benninger and now makes falsificated documents. The "business" runs well until Mehring gets blackmailed and falls in love with Claudia Klessing, a lawyer. He wants to cop out, but after the final coup in Salzburg he is caught by the police. Thanks to the help of Claudia and Herrmann, Mehring can escape from pretrial detention.

== Cars ==
The automobile star of the movie is a white sportscar with gullwing doors, the CW311, later built as Isdera Imperator 108i. The other was a rainbow colored combination of body styles and engine that the that Porsche factory did not offer at the time: the Porsche 911 Targa turbo built by bb Rainer Buchmann. In addition, members of a Porsche owner club showed up with their cars.

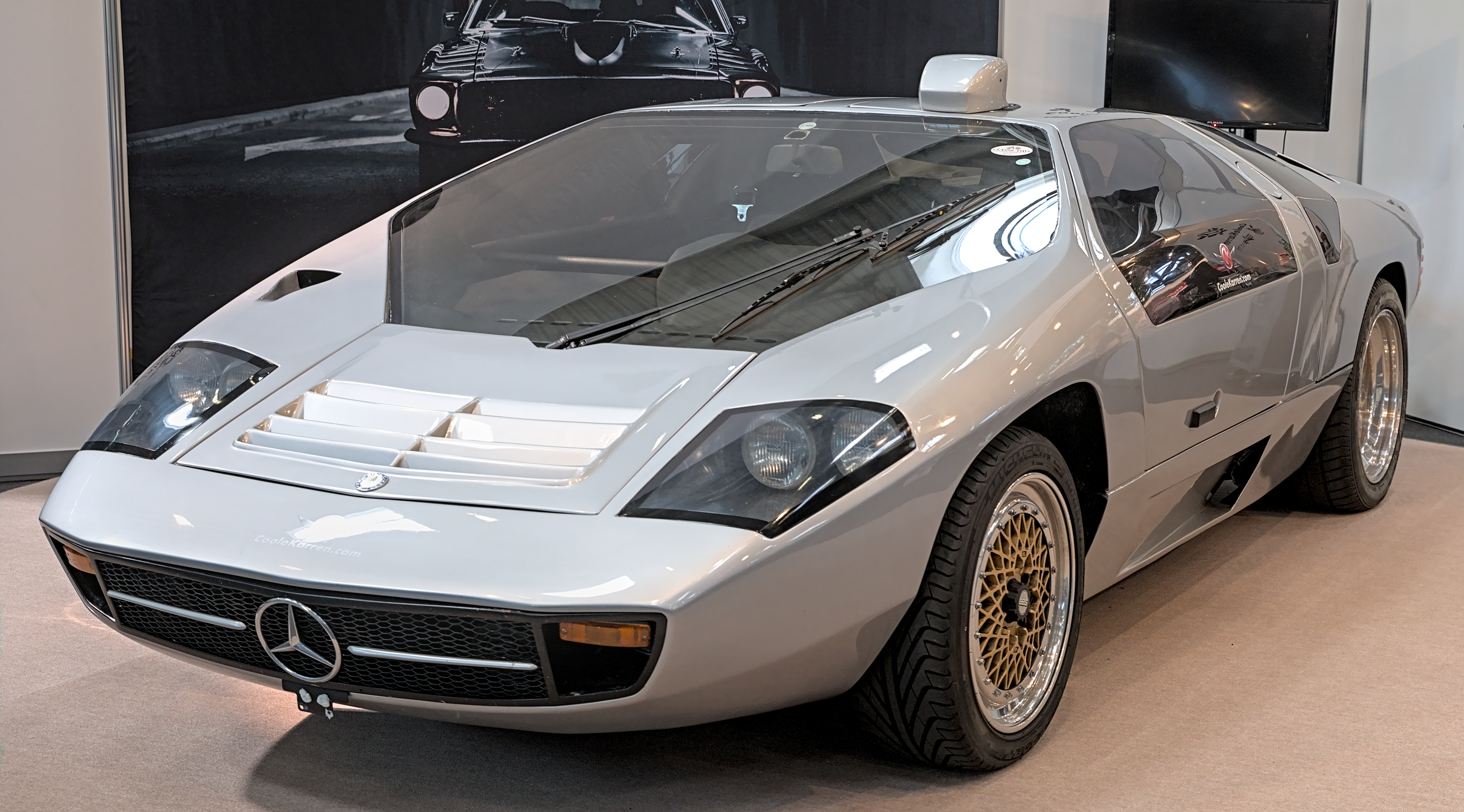
CW311-like Isdera Imperator 108i with Mercedes-Benz badging

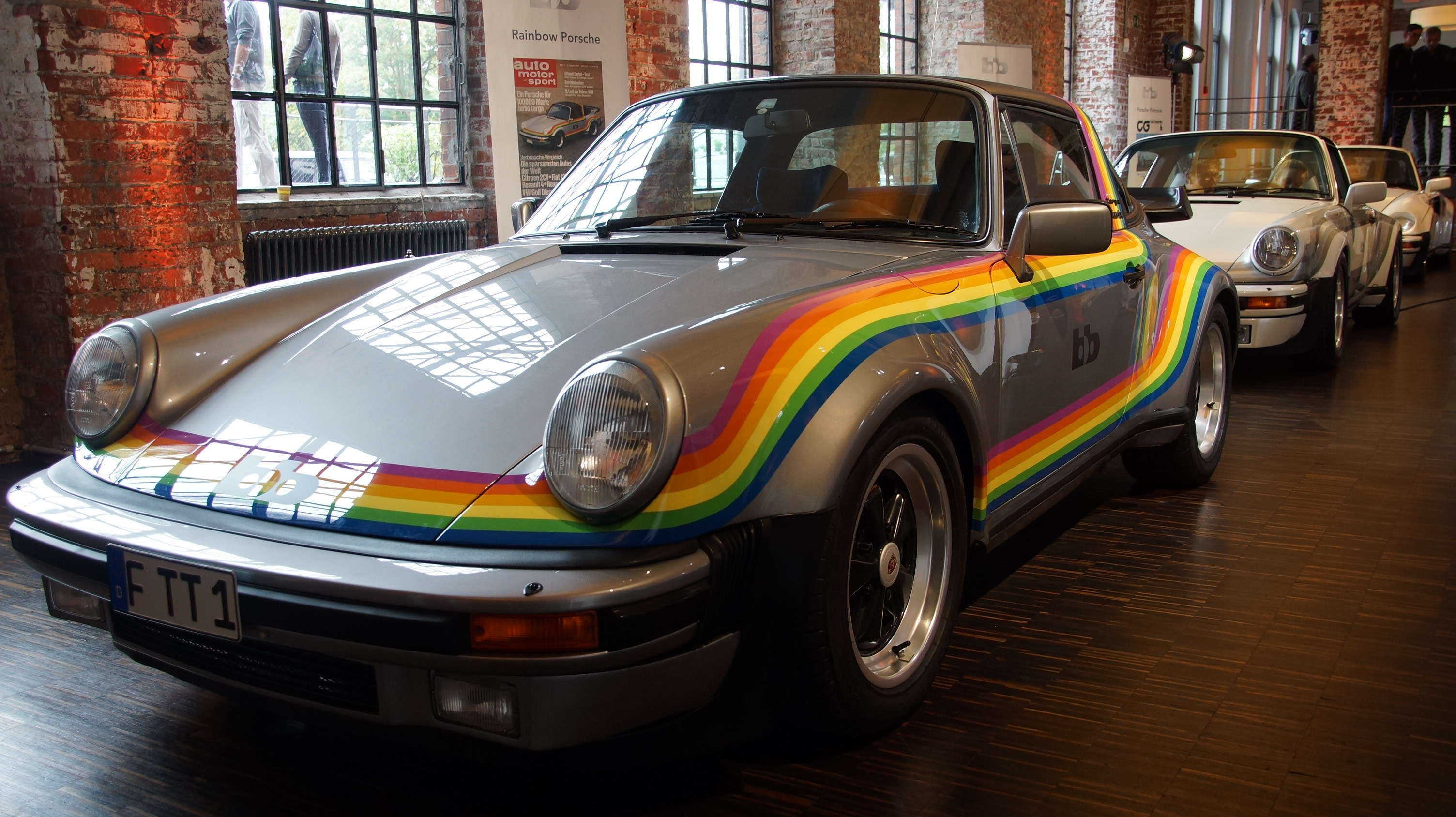
bb Rainbow Porsche Targa Turbo

== Cast ==
- Bernd Stephan – Robert Mehring
- Anny Duperey – Claudia Klessing
- Hans Beerhenke – Herrmann Aichinger
- Peter Kuhnert – Mario
- Luigi Tortora – Carlo
- Ivan Desny – Consul Barnet
- Adrian Hoven – Benninger
- Götz Kauffmann –
- Dieter Augustin – Fischer
- Michel Galabru – Thibaut
- Eddie Constantine – Laroux, police officer
- Adolfo Celi – Head of police in Palermo
