= Supreme Commander =

Supreme Commander may refer to:

== Military ==
- Commander-in-chief, a military rank
  - Generalissimo or generalissimus, a (usually informal) term for a senior military commander, or a foreign term for a senior general
  - Supreme Commander–in–Chief, title for wartime commanders
  - Allied Supreme Commander, position held by Marshal Ferdinand Foch during World War I
  - Supreme Allied Commander, title held by the most senior commander within certain multinational military alliances
  - Supreme Commander UNIFORCE
  - Supreme Allied Commander Europe, military commander of the North Atlantic Treaty Organization (NATO)
  - Supreme Allied Commander Atlantic, head of NATO's now-defunct Allied Command Atlantic
  - Supreme Commander for the Allied Powers, title held by General Douglas MacArthur during the Occupation of Japan following World War II
  - Supreme Commander of the People's Republic of China
  - Supreme Commander of the Indian Armed Forces, a title of the President of India
  - Supreme Commander of the Armed Forces of North Korea
  - Supreme Commander of the Malaysian Armed Forces
  - Supreme Commander-in-Chief of the Armed Forces of the Russian Federation
  - Supreme Commander of the Swedish Armed Forces
  - Supreme Commander of the Unified Armed Forces of the Warsaw Treaty Organization
  - Supreme Commander's Headquarters (India and Pakistan), transitional British military authority during the partition of India
- Supreme commander (militant), a title used for the head of a militant group or an organization

== Media ==
- Supreme Commander video game series developed by Gas Powered Games
  - Supreme Commander (video game), real-time strategy video game released in 2007
  - Supreme Commander: Forged Alliance, a stand-alone expansion for Supreme Commander released in 2007
  - Supreme Commander 2, the sequel to Supreme Commander released in 2010

== See also ==
- Commander in Chief (disambiguation)
