= Jeep Commander =

Automotive nameplate by Jeep

The Jeep Commander is an automobile nameplate used by Jeep since 2005 for several SUV models:

- Jeep Commander (XK), a mid-size SUV produced from 2005 to 2010
- Jeep Commander (2022), a mid-size crossover SUV based on the Jeep Compass produced for markets outside of the US and Canada since 2021
- Jeep Grand Commander, a mid-size crossover SUV produced for the Chinese market from 2018 to 2022, also marketed as the Jeep Commander until 2020 for the two-row model
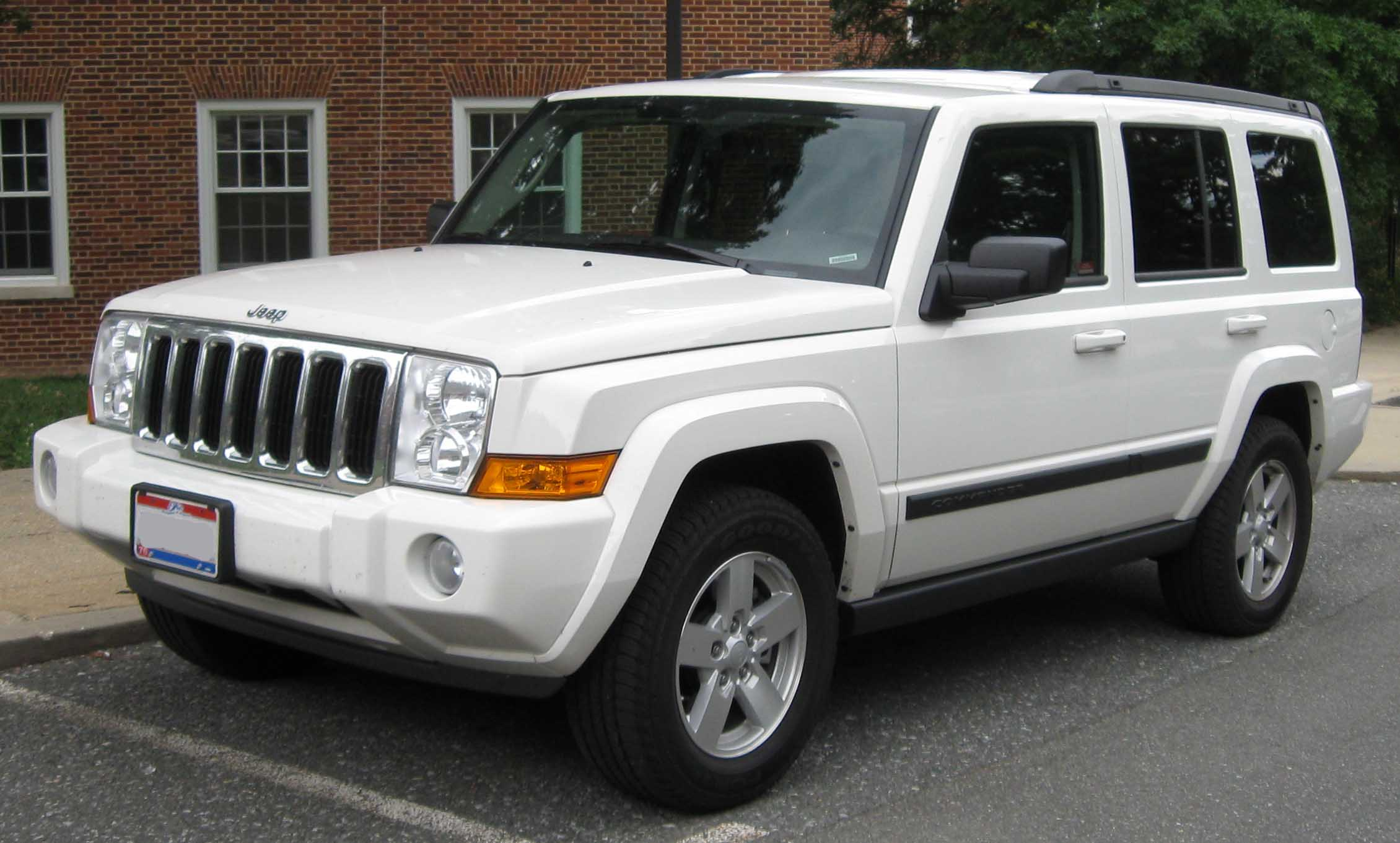
2006–2008 Jeep Commander (US)

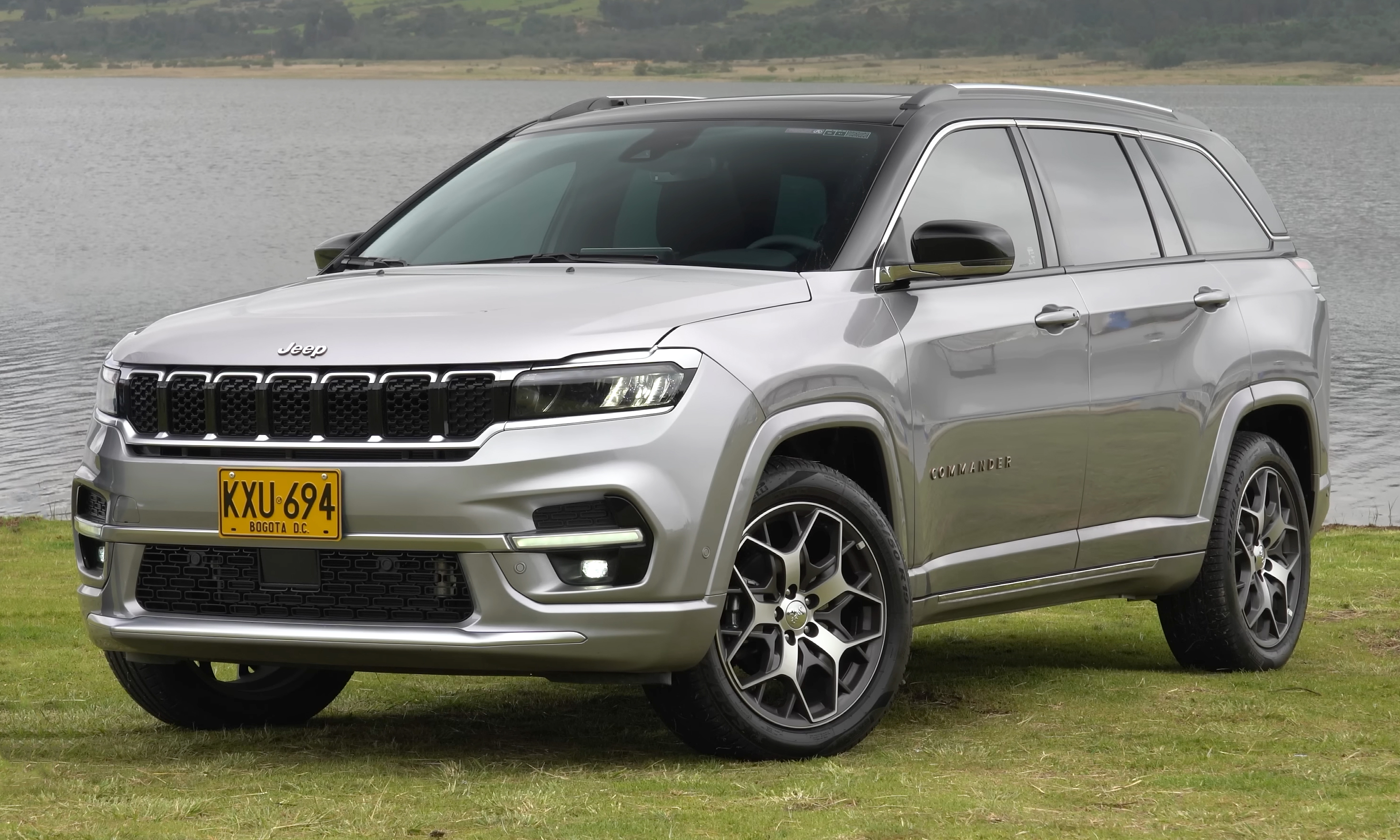
2021 Jeep Commander (Brazil)

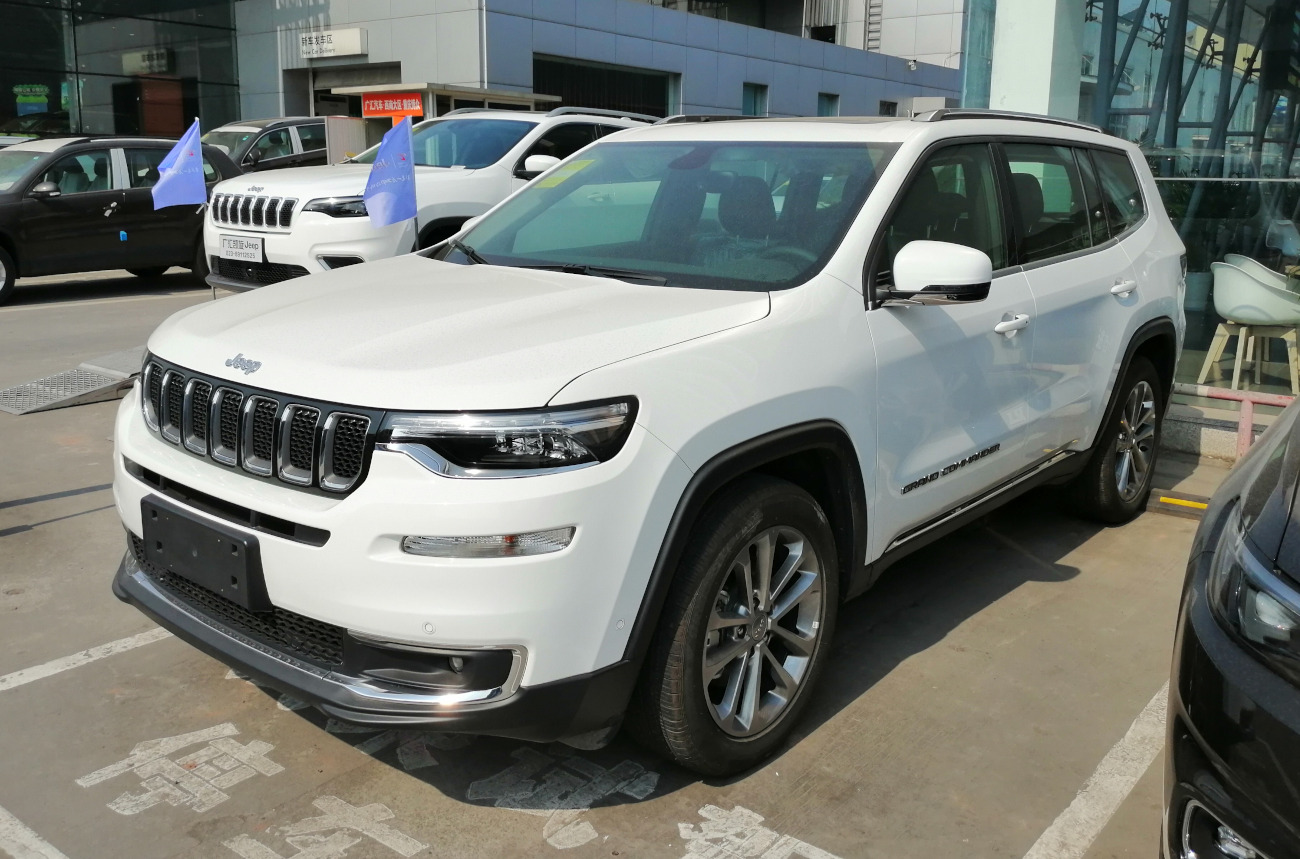
2019 Jeep Grand Commander (China)

== See also ==
- Jeep Commando
- Mahindra Commander, an unrelated but Jeep-based vehicle produced by Mahindra
- Commander (disambiguation)
