= The Commanders =

- Genre: Anthology; Drama
- Country of origin: United States
- Original language: English

Production
- Production company: A+E Studios

Original release
- Network: History

The Commanders was an upcoming American anthology drama series that was set to premiere on History.

== Premise ==
The Commanders was described by History as: "an anthology scripted series envisioned as an annual television event ranging from four to 10 hours in length. It will dramatize pivotal moments in U.S. history that defined the legacy of the men who served as Presidents of the United States — from the first one, George Washington, to Number 42, Bill Clinton."

== Production ==
=== Development ===
On March 21, 2017, History announced that they were developing an anthology drama series entitled The Commanders that focuses on different pivotal moments in U.S. history that defined the legacies of the men who served as President of the United States. The first installments of the series were said to focus on Bill Clinton, Ronald Reagan, Theodore Roosevelt, James Madison, and Thomas Jefferson. As part of the development process, History had optioned several biographies as source material for The Commanders including The Breach: Inside the Imp]eachment and Trial of William Jefferson Clinton by Peter Baker, Theodore Rex by Edmund Morris, Thomas Jefferson and the Tripoli Pirates by Brian Kilmeade, The Invisible Bridge: The Fall of Nixon and the Rise of Reagan by Rick Perlstein, and Alliance: The Inside Story of How Roosevelt, Stalin & Churchill Won One War & Began Another by Jonathan Fenby. The series was set to be produced by A+E Studios with each season being overseen by different production staffs and writers.

On November 30, 2017, it was announced that History had decided to develop their adaptation of Peter Baker's book, separately from The Commanders series, as its own miniseries. The series was set to be written by R. J. Cutler and David K. Israel. Cutler was also set to direct the series and executive produce it alongside Barry Jossen. Production companies involved with the series included A+E Studios and FremantleMedia North America. While The Breach was to no longer air as the first installment in The Commanders anthology series, there were plans for it to be followed by a limited series about other presidents. The miniseries was one of six such projects put in development in the spring of 2017, with the others still in the works.

On April 4, 2018, it was announced that History was no longer moving forward with The Breach. It was further clarified that the miniseries had been intended to be the first season of The Commanders, and the other seasons of the series were still in development. Producers for The Breach reportedly had trouble casting the lead role of Bill Clinton after making various offers to "A-list" actors which contributed to the season's demise.

== See also ==
- The American Presidency with Bill Clinton - 2022 series
