= Rainer Buchmann =

German car designer

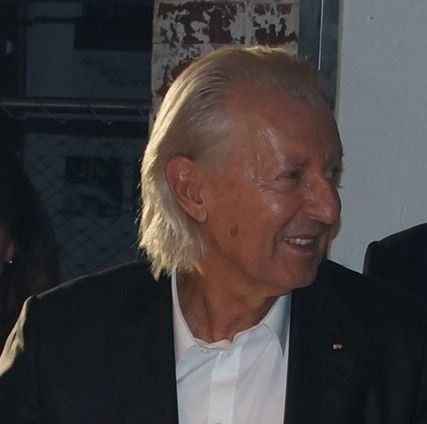
Rainer Buchmann in 2014

Rainer Buchmann is a German car designer, who founded the "bb" company specialised in the modification of luxury cars.

== Life and career ==
Rainer Buchmann founded the bb company in Frankfurt in 1973 with the aim of modifying Porsches. Buchmann's strategy was to tailor models to individual customer's tastes, as well as take advantage of gaps in the market left by Porsche and other major manufacturers by building variations of models which they chose not to pursue. One of bb's first models was a conversion for the 911 Targa which turned it into a Turbo, a combination which Porsche did not offer at the time. At the Photokina fair in 1976, a Porsche 911 Coupé which Buchmann converted into a Porsche Targa and painted with the rainbow colours of Polaroid was exhibited for Polaroid. Buchmann produced a number of modifications for Porsche and Mercedes-Benz cars for international clients.

Buchmann employed the former Porsche employee Eberhard Schulz in 1978 and built together with him the bb Mercedes-Benz CW 311 in Frankfurt, which was permitted to bear the Mercedes star. It was one of the most streamlined and fastest sport cars of its time with a maximum speed of over 300 km/h (190 mph). Both the Rainbow Turbo Targa and the CW 311 appeared in the 1980 German movie Car-napping. The CW311 was later built as Isdera Imperator 108i.

Later cars included the bb Flatnose Porsche, the bb Magic Top Mercedes-Benz, the bb Volkswagen Polo Paris/Carat and a conversion of one of the last Mercedes-Benz 600 Pullman with free standing wing arches in 1930s style. Buchmann became partner of well known German companies including car and paint manufacturers. The company worked with major manufacturers on various projects, including with BMW on the Futuro motorcycle concept, as well as with Volkswagen studying the use of bb's new 'Dinfos' electronic dashboard technology in the Volkswagen Polo.

Buchmann saw himself as a car couturier, because his designs were further advanced than those of commercial car tuning companies. He excelled also by technical his developments. Beside his car body modifications he was a pioneer for leading edge automotive electronics, which is today common in many mass produced cars: a remote control for the central locking system, infrared sensors as park assistants, digital computer systems and the multi function steering wheel, for which he filed a patent, and the speaking cockpit.

His turnover declined in the 1980s as in the worldwide aftermarket tuning sector. The deteriorating dollar exchange rate affected his exports to the United States and Near East, so that he closed his business in 1986. Subsequently, he worked as a self employed consultant.

Buchmann started a comeback in Frankfurt in 2014. He presented the bb Moonracer, a new interpretation of the Turbo Targa Rainbow Porsche of 1976 based on a 1980s Porsche Targa. Parallel to this a book about bb was published by Heel Verlag, which was written by Dr. Gerold Lingnau the retired editor of the technology and motor section of the Frankfurter Allgemeine Zeitung. The book reviews under the title "bb Rainer Buchmann: Innovation-Design-Emotion" the achievements of the car couturier.

=== Bankruptcy in 1986 ===
In the mid-1980s Buchmann's sales declined, as did the entire tuning industry. The fall in the value of the US dollar affected both US and Middle Eastern customers. In the spring of 1986 bb went bankrupt. Shortly before, vehicle distribution was expanded to Japan. Buchmann employed more than 40 people at its peak. Rainer Buchmann worked as a management consultant for a long time after his company's bankruptcy.

=== Re-transformation in 2014 ===
In September 2014, Rainer Buchmann launched a comeback in the car industry in Frankfurt am Main. Buchmann presented the ‘bb Moonracer’, a reinterpretation of the 1976 rainbow-turbo-targa based on a 1980 Porsche Targa. The power of the air-cooled six-cylinder boxer turbo engine was increased to 330 hp (243 kW). A tablet computer in the centre console and a removable glass roof are part of the vehicle's equipment.

== Gallery ==
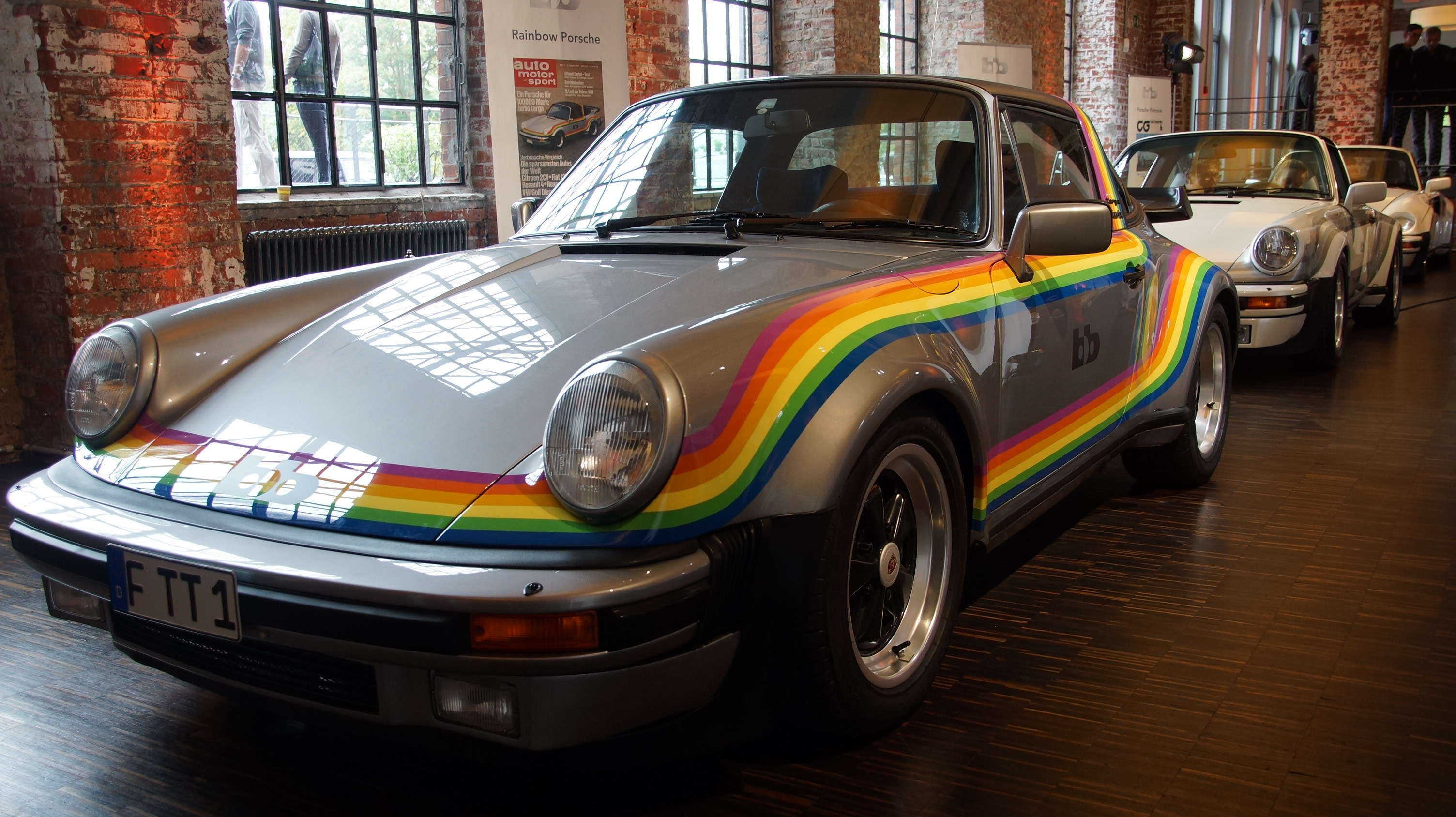
bb Rainbow Porsche, Moonracer Porsche and Flatnose Porsche in September 2014

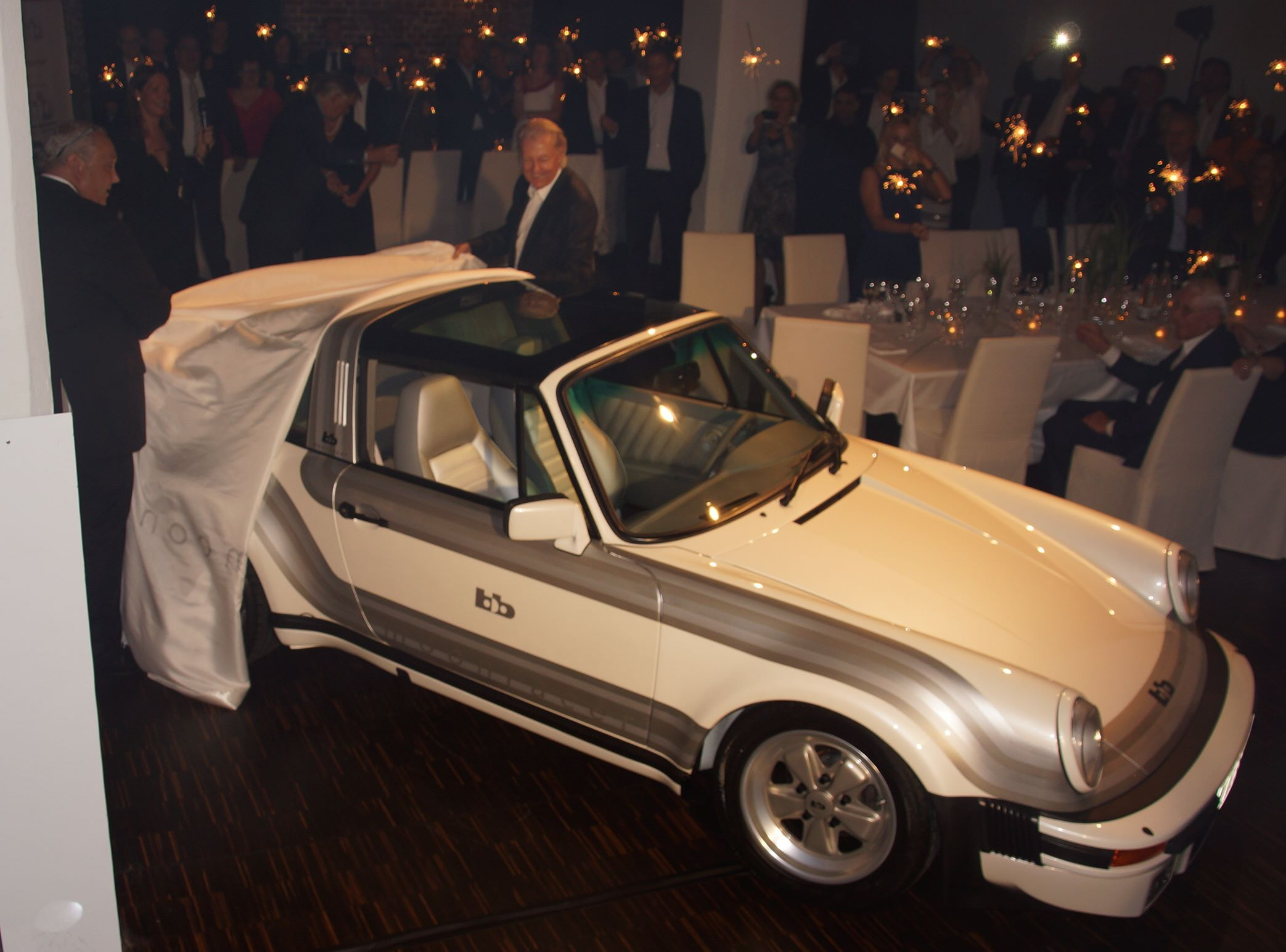
Rainer Buchmann unvealing the bb Moonracer Porsche in Klassikstadt Frankfurt on 20 September 2014

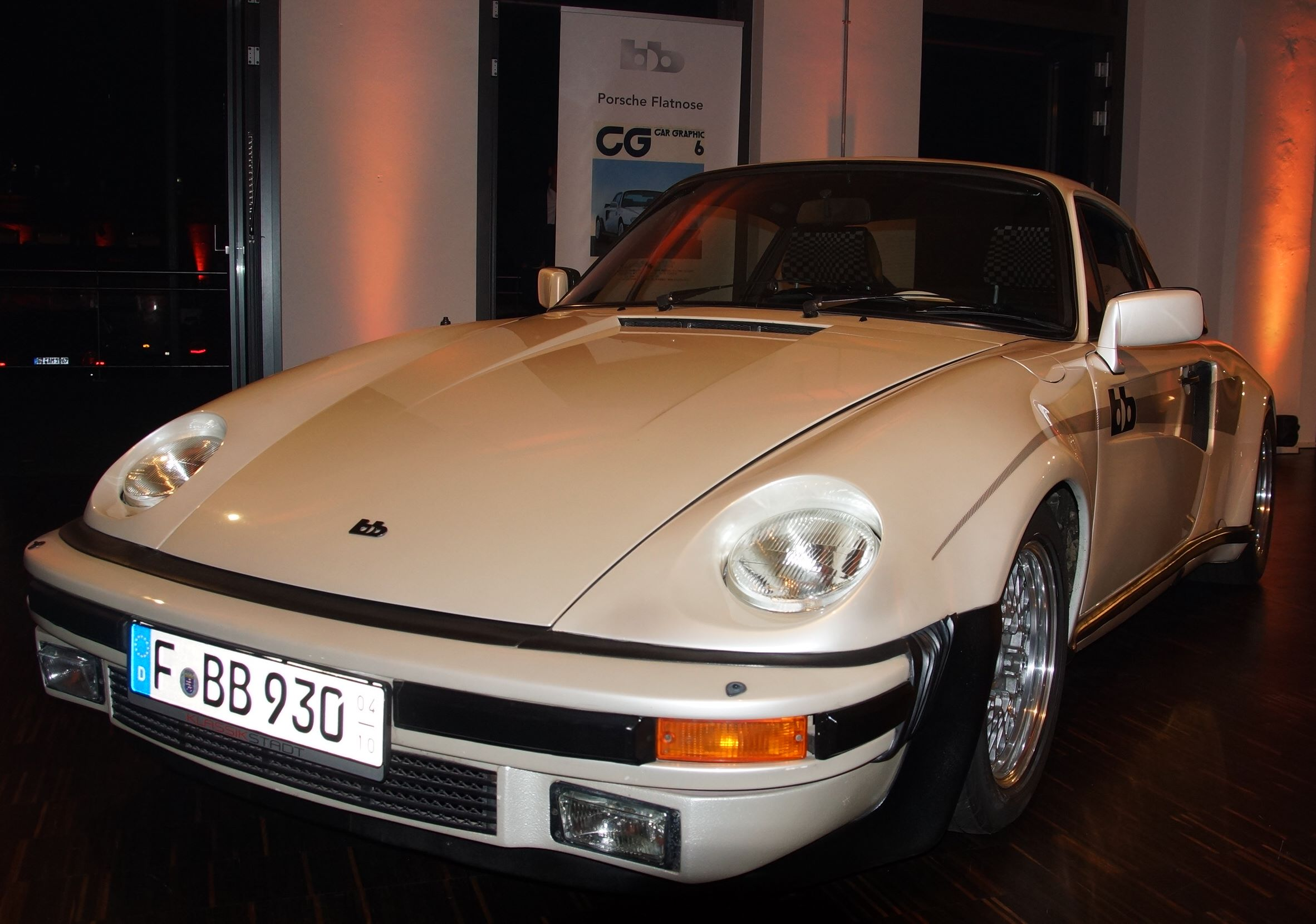
bb Flatnose Porsche

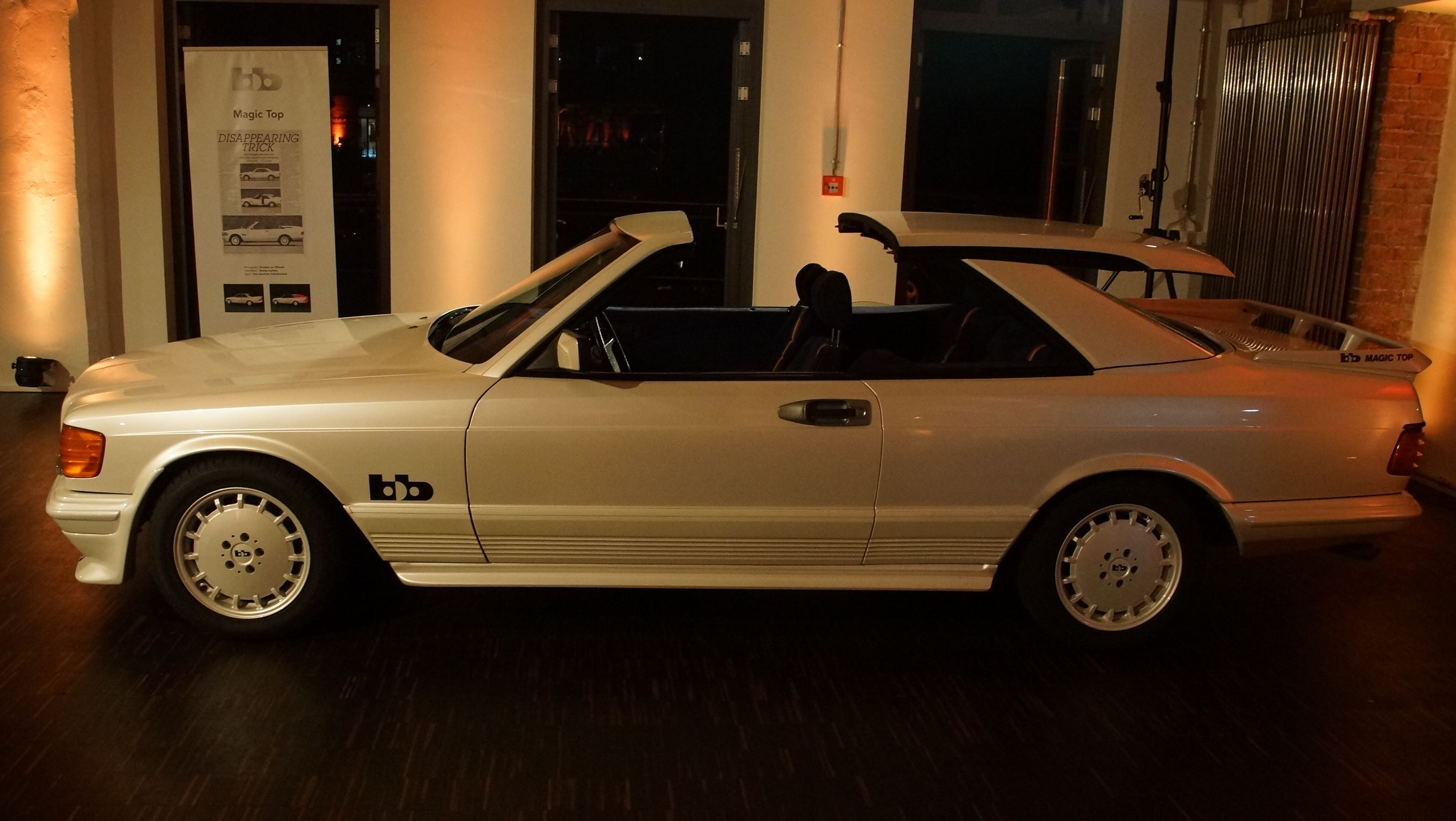
bb Magic Top Mercedes-Benz

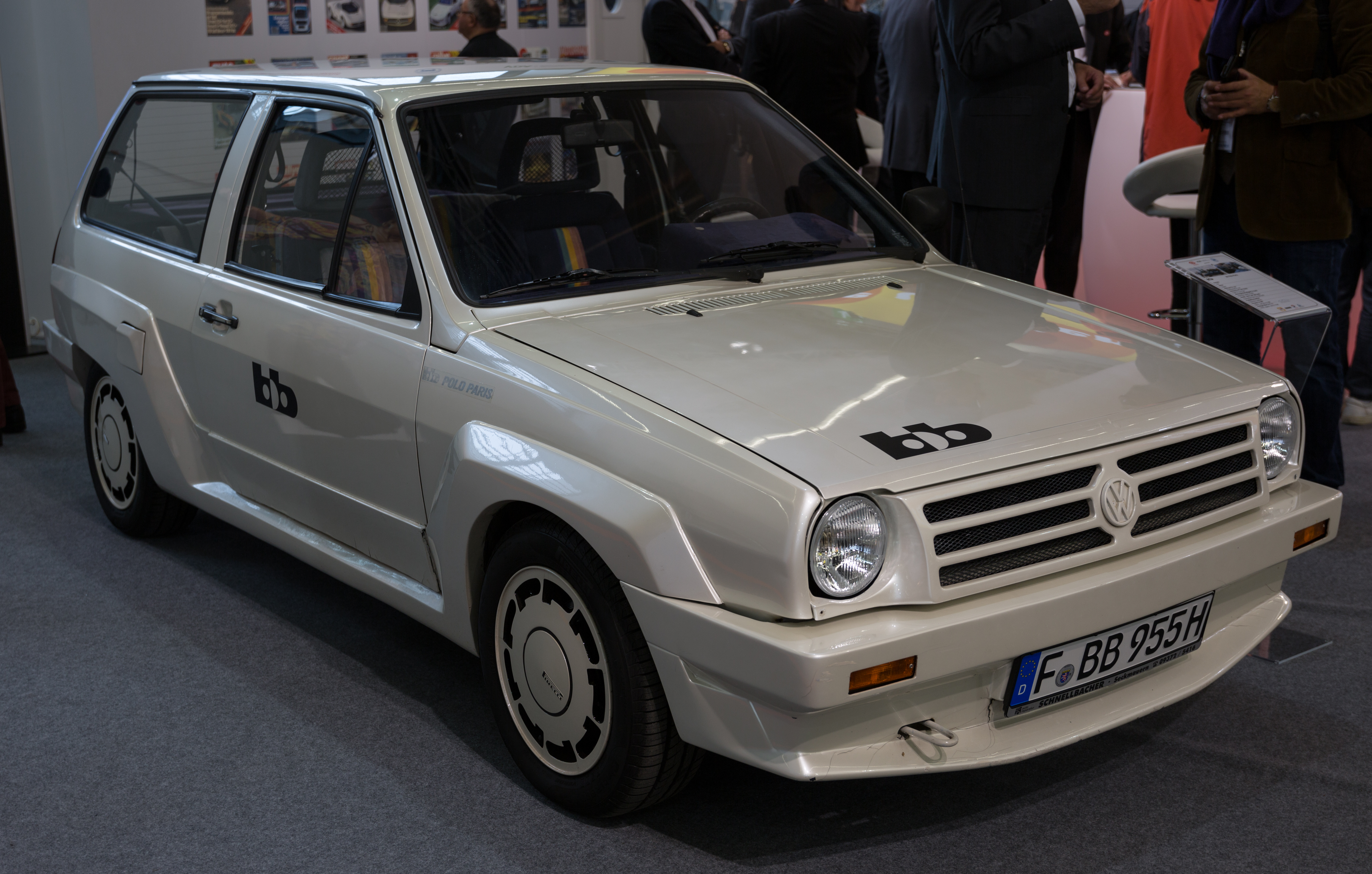
bb Volkswagen Polo Paris/Carat

== Patents ==
- Electric steering device for vehicles. EP 0153434 A1.
