= Commander in Chief (disambiguation) =

A commander-in-chief is the commander of a nation's military forces or significant element of those forces.

Commander in Chief may refer to:

- Commander in Chief (TV series), American drama about a fictional U.S. President
- Commander in Chief (novel), novel by Mark Greaney
- Commander in Chief (video game), government simulation game also known as Geo-Political-Simulator
- Commander in Chief (horse) (1990–2007), British thoroughbred racehorse
- "Commander in Chief" (song), 2020 single by Demi Lovato
- The Commander-In-Chief, Norwegian female guitarist
- Commander-in-Chief's Trophy, college football competition among the three U.S. service academies
- Operation Commander-in-Chief, an operation at Iran-Iraq War

== See also ==
- Supreme Commander (disambiguation)
