= Isdera Commendatore GT =

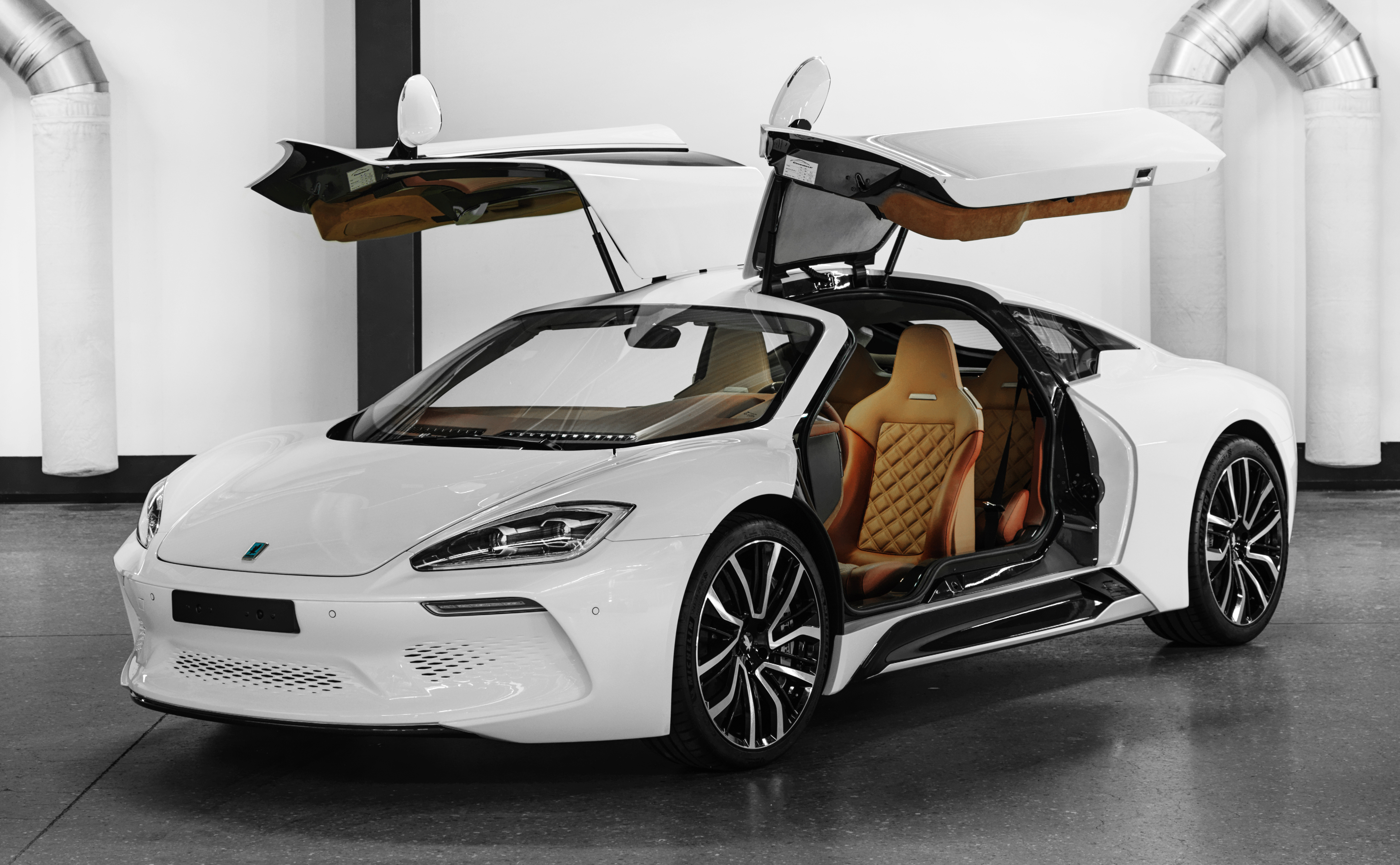

Overview
- Manufacturer: Isdera AG
- Production: 2018
- Designer: Gregor Gardavski, Stefan Peters

Body and chassis
- Class: Sports car
- Body style: 2-door 4-seater coupé
- Layout: Dual Motors AWD
- Doors: Gullwing

Powertrain
- Electric motor: 2x permanent magnet motors
- Power output: 804 PS (591 kW; 793 hp)
- Transmission: 2-speed
- Battery: 105 kWh

Dimensions
- Wheelbase: 2,820 mm (111.0 in)
- Length: 4,920 mm (193.7 in)
- Width: 1,950 mm (76.8 in)
- Height: 1,290 mm (50.8 in)
- Curb weight: 1,750 kg (3,858 lb)

Chronology
- Predecessor: Isdera Commendatore 112i (spiritual)

The Isdera Commendatore GT is a 2+2-seater sports car produced by the German car manufacturer Isdera AG. Stefan Peters, the CEO of Isdera AG and Gregor Gardavski were responsible for the design. The program was led by Stefan Peters. The Commendatore GT was the first time introduced at Auto China in 2018. It is equipped with two 300 kW (402 hp) electric motors, for a total of 600 kW (805 hp), as well as 1,060 N⋅m (782 lbf⋅ft) of torque and a top speed of 302 km/h (188 mph). It also has gull-wing doors. Only two cars were produced to showcase Isdera AG's service range.

== Gallery ==
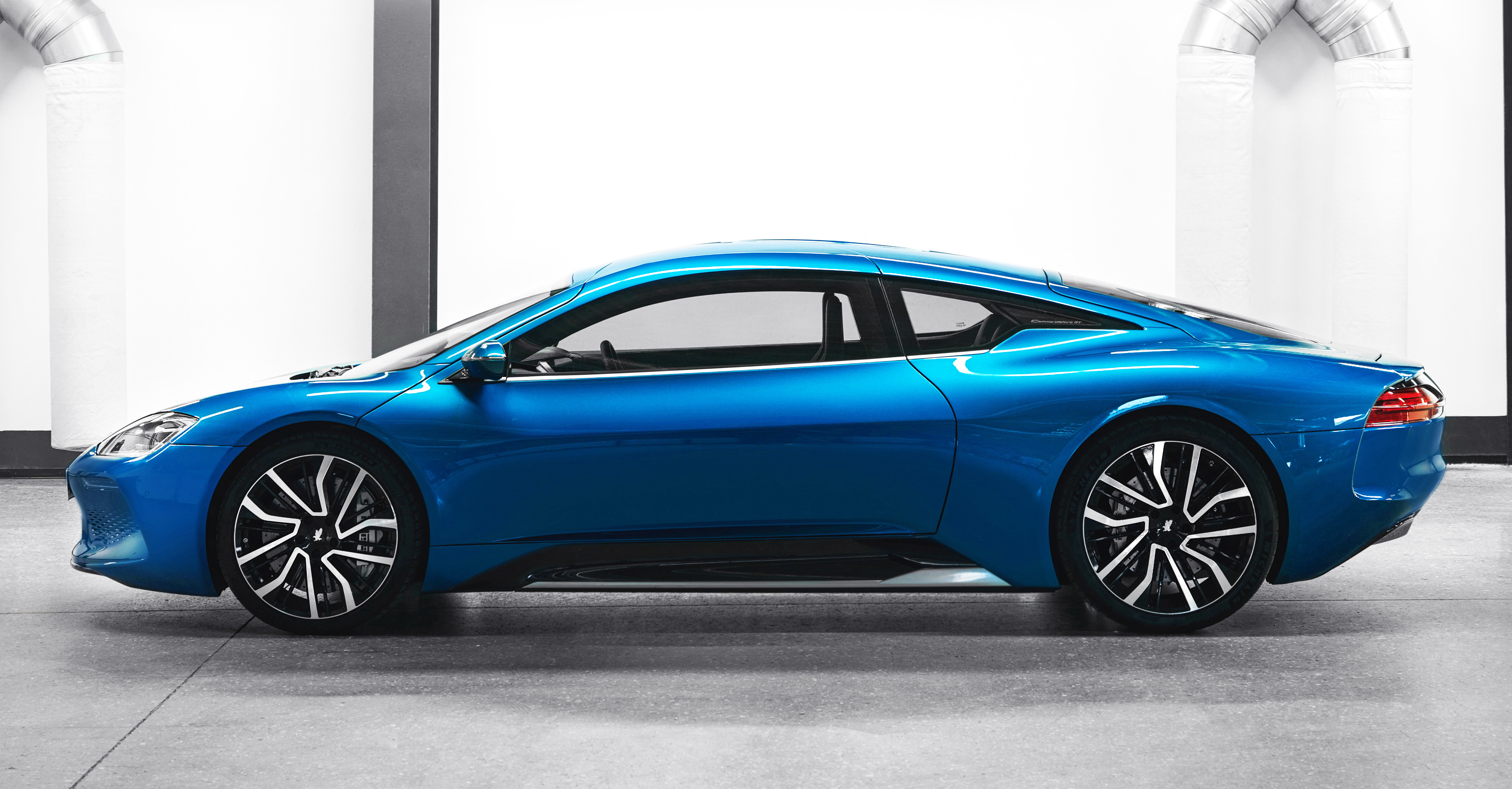
Side view

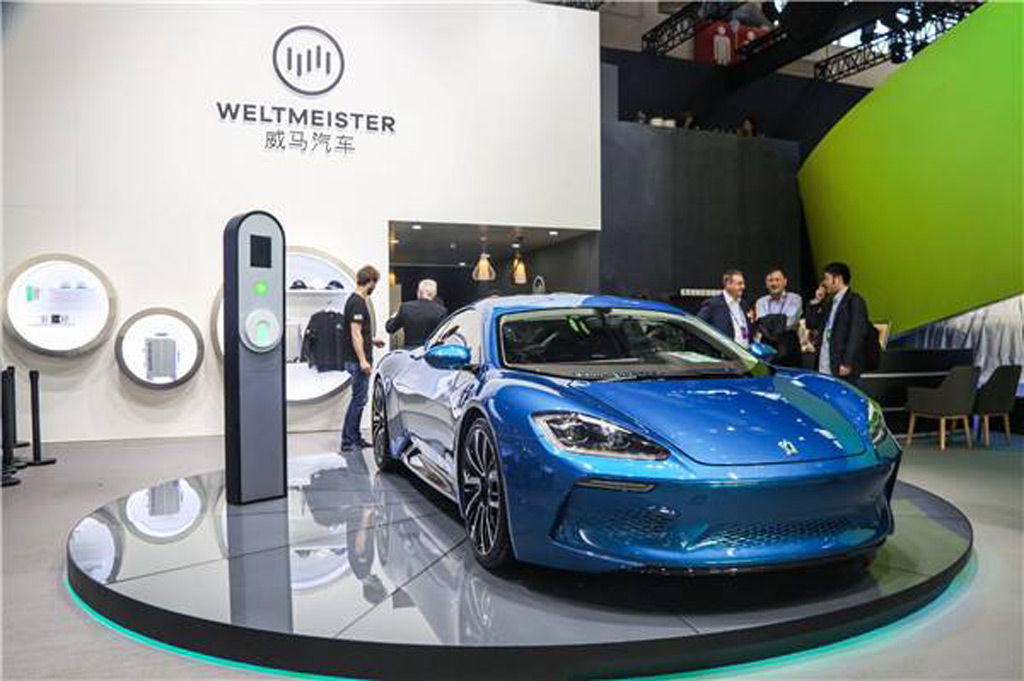
Commendatore GT at the Beijing Autoshow
