= Isdera Imperator 108i =

German mid-engine sports car (1984–1993)

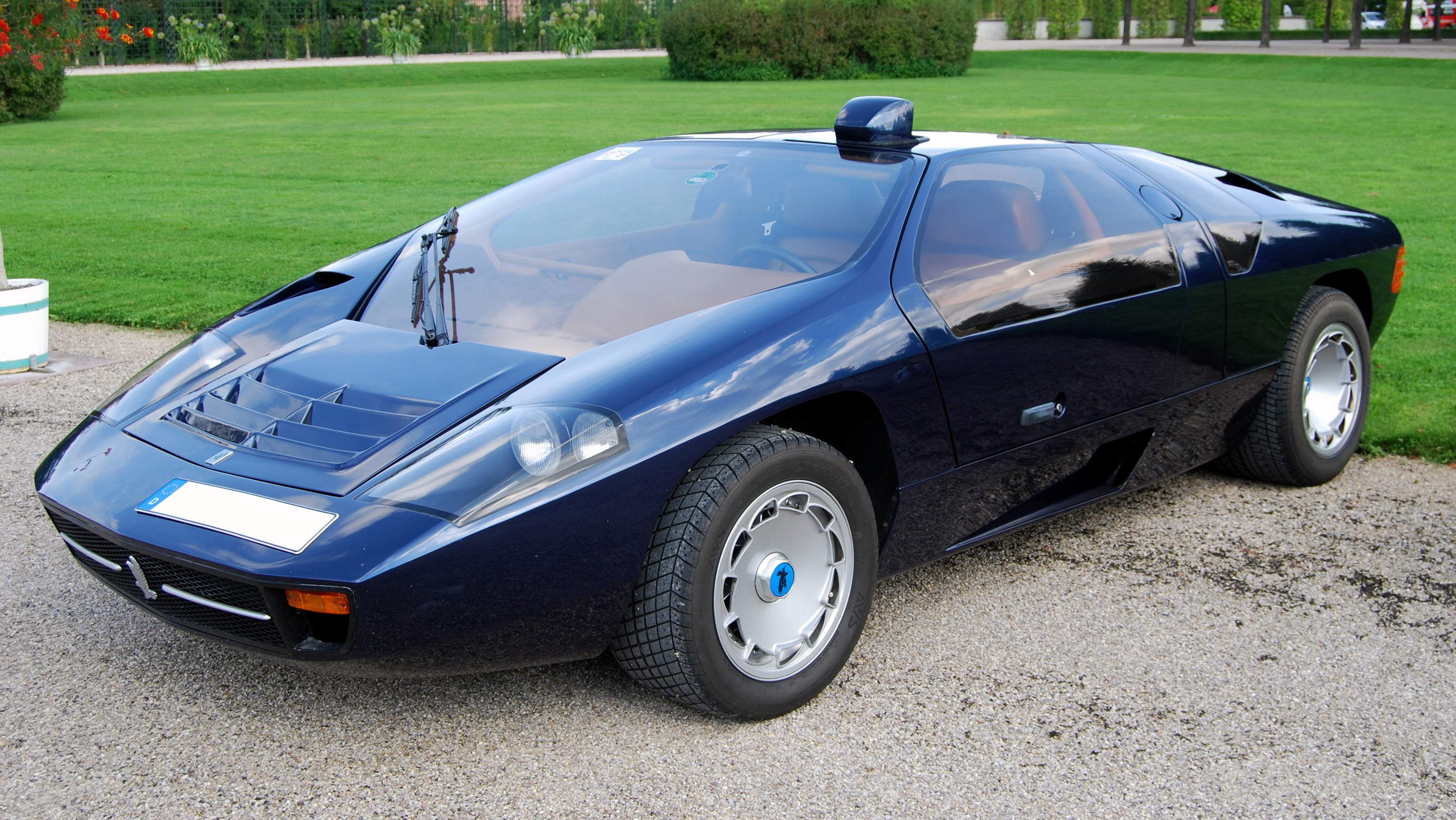

Overview
- Manufacturer: Isdera GmbH
- Production: 1984–1993; 30 units produced
- Assembly: Germany: Leonberg
- Designer: Eberhard Schulz

Body and chassis
- Class: Sports car (S)
- Body style: 2-door coupé
- Layout: Rear mid-engine, rear wheel drive
- Platform: Fibreglass body over tubular steel chassis
- Related: Mercedes-Benz CW311

Powertrain
- Engine: 5.0 L (5,000 cc) Mercedes-Benz M117 V8; 5.6 L (5,600 cc) Mercedes-Benz M117 V8; 5.6 L (5,600 cc) AMG V8; 6.0 L (6,000 cc) AMG V8
- Transmission: 5-speed ZF manual

Dimensions
- Wheelbase: 2,480 mm (98 in)
- Length: 4,220 mm (166 in)
- Width: 1,835 mm (72 in)
- Height: 1,135 mm (45 in)
- Curb weight: 1,250 kg (2,756 lb)

Chronology
- Predecessor: Isdera Spyder 033
- Successor: Isdera Commendatore 112i

The Isdera Imperator 108i is a low-volume German sports car produced from 1984 to 1993. The Imperator 108i was born out of the CW311 concept car from 1978, which Eberhard Schulz, who at the time worked as a design engineer for Porsche, designed in his free time, using Mercedes parts, mainly the V8 engines (Porsche had no 928 yet). Mercedes-Benz allowed the use of the Mercedes badge and name but had no interest in putting the CW311 into production, so Schulz established his own engineering company, Isdera, to produce the car under his own brand. Isdera AG owns the trademarks to Imperator as separate brand.

== Specifications and performance ==
Inspired by the Gullwing Mercedes 300 SL and the Mercedes-Benz C111 experimental cars, and with a drag coefficient (cd) of 0.311, the CW311 concept was built by the bb company of Rainer Buchmann. They used the big but heavy 6.9 litre Mercedes-Benz M100 engine and other Mercedes parts. Reportedly, Buchmann initially fitted the Mercedes star to the CW311 without permission from Mercedes, but later received authorization from the factory to display it, on the condition that only one example was made wearing the logo. Some sources have speculated that Mercedes allowed the use of their logo on the car to steal press from the new BMW M1. The one-off car starred in the 1980 comedy "Car-napping".

The Imperator 108i used a fiberglass body upon a tubular steel spaceframe. Little was changed from the original Mercedes-Benz show car with the most noticeable changes being the replacement of the pop-up headlights with two fixed units and more conventional tail lights sourced from Mercedes-Benz. The original Imperator 108i featured a 5.0 L (5,000 cc) Mercedes-Benz M117 V8 engine which gave the vehicle a top speed of 283 km/h (176 mph) and a 0–97 km/h (0–60 mph) acceleration time of 5.0 seconds. As Mercedes-Benz developed more powerful V8 engines, they were used in the Imperator 108i. Later engines included a 5.6 L (5,600 cc) Mercedes-Benz M117 V8, a 5.6 L (5,600 cc) AMG V8 and a 6.0 L (6,000 cc) AMG V8 which saw an eventual increase of power from 300 hp (304 PS; 224 kW) to 390 hp (395 PS; 291 kW), with both AMG engines featuring advanced 32-valve cylinder heads.

Unusually, the Imperator 108i featured a rear-view periscope in place of conventional rear view mirrors which gave the driver the rear view, creating a bulge on the roof. It also featured gullwing doors.

Inside, the car featured a luxurious interior and sourced many interior components from the Porsche 928.

== Production ==
=== Introduction ===
The Imperator 108i was first unveiled to public at the Geneva International Motor Show in March 1984. (Note: The Geneva International Motor Show has been held annually every March.)

=== Model year changes ===
In 1991, the car received a face-lift which saw the return of the pop-up headlamps from the 1978 show car and a more curvaceous body shape, additional vents at the front near the doors, NACA duct on the front in place of three vents, redesigned front grille and repositioning of turning indicators from the front grille to the bottom of the headlamps along with optional wing mirrors. Around 17 cars were produced with the face lift design.

=== End of production ===
Production ended in 1993, when the Isdera company itself went out of business. Total of 30 examples produced, of which 24 were the pre-facelift models. Reportedly, two of these 30 Imperator 108i were exported to Japan.

== Gallery ==
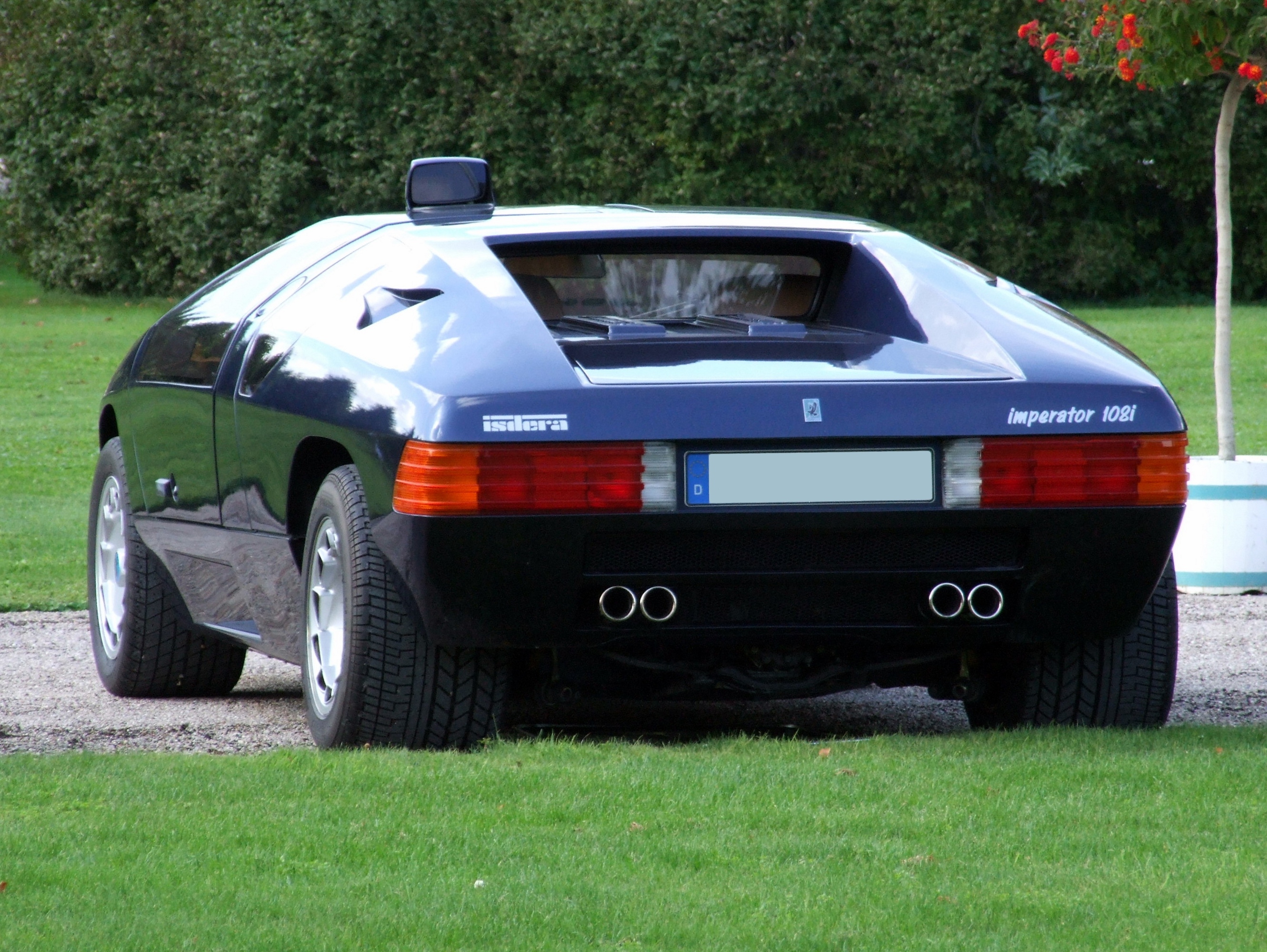
Rear view

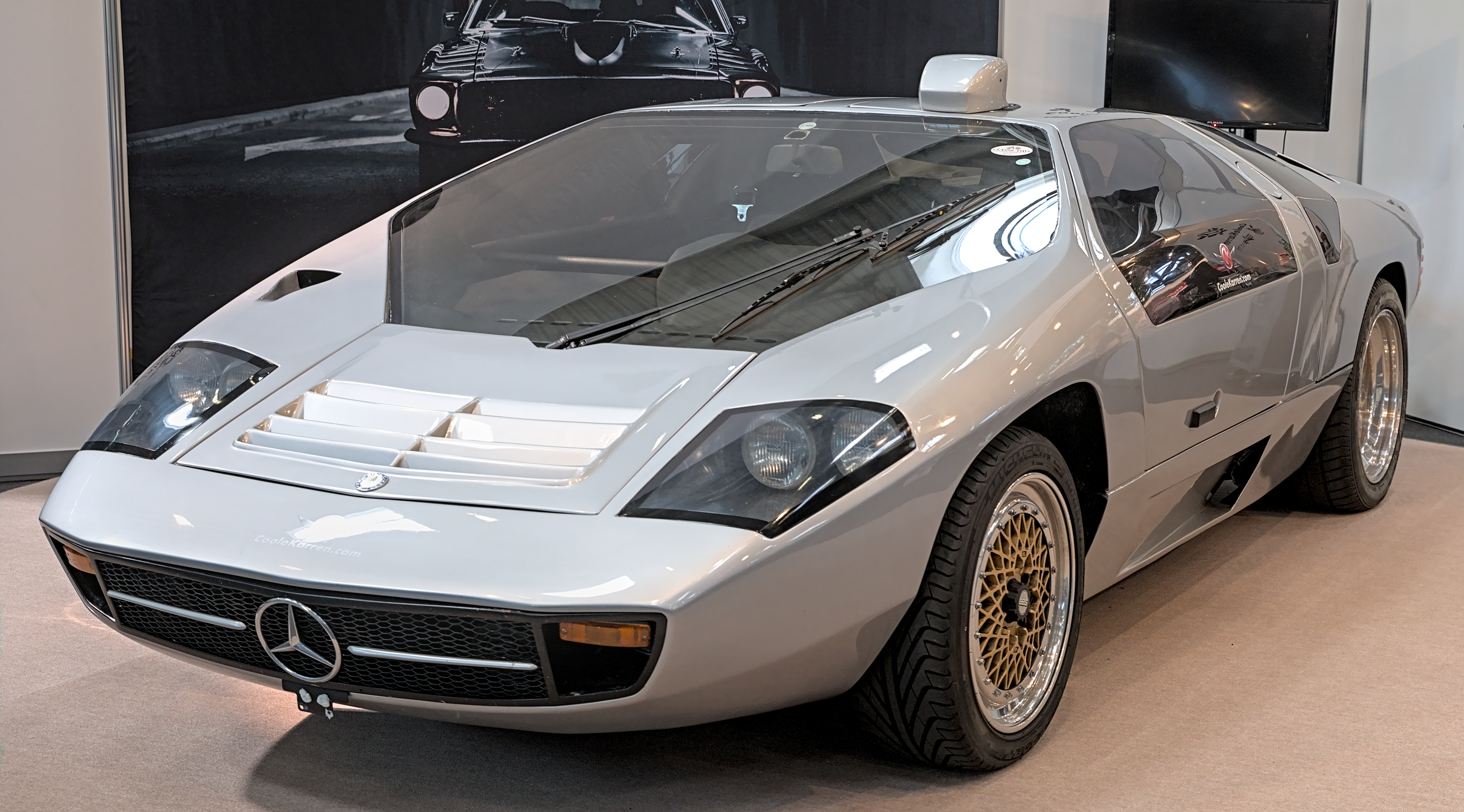
With Mercedes-Benz badging

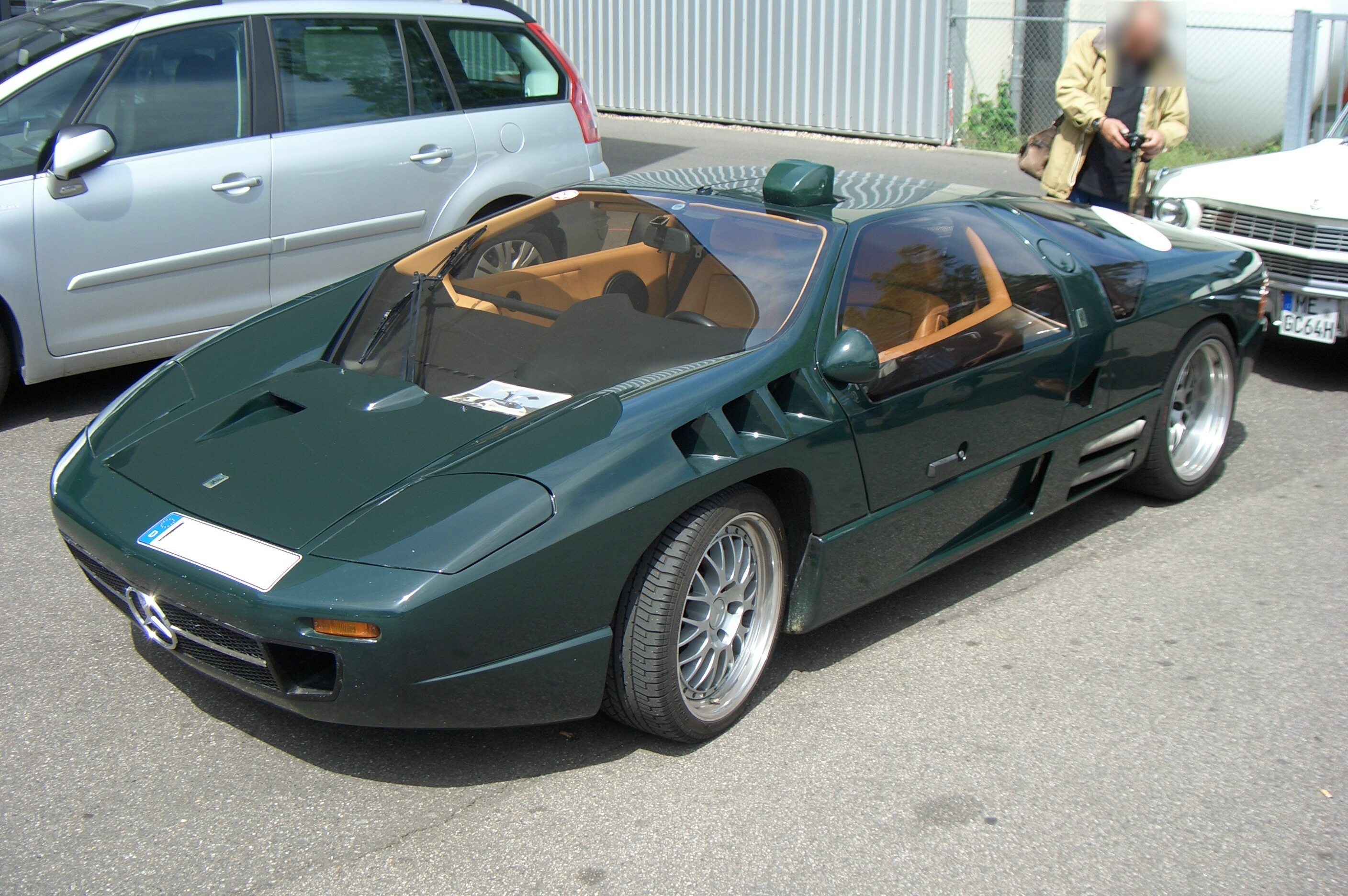
An Imperator 108i featuring the 1991 face-lift

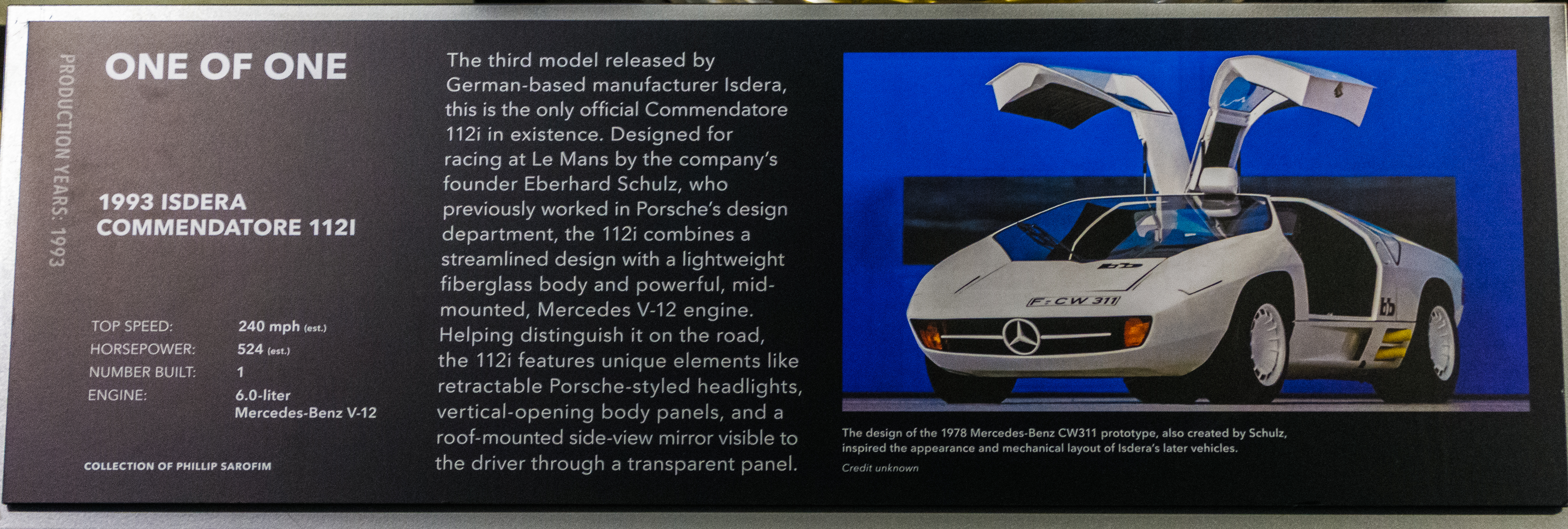
CW311 picture
