= Isdera =

German specialty automaker and design service provider

- Type: Private
- Industry: Automotive
- Founded: 1982; 44 years ago in Leonberg, West Germany
- Founder: Eberhard Schulz
- Headquarters: Shanghai
- Website: https://www.isdera.com/

Isdera or Ingenieurbüro für Styling, Design und Racing (English: Engineering Company for Styling, Design and Racing) was an exclusive small-series car builder and automotive service provider. The company was founded and formerly based in Leonberg, Germany. Each high-performance sports car was hand-built by a small team of craftsmen. Each vehicle was custom built for its original buyer.

== History ==
In order to seek a job at one of the automotive companies of Germany, Eberhard Schulz built his own car in the garage of his home in 1969 called the Erator GTE. He drove the Ford GT40 like car to Porsche's and Mercedes-Benz's headquarters and was subsequently offered a job at Porsche in the design department in 1970. With Zuffenhausen planning no successor to the 911, instead going with front engine 928 and 924, in 1978, Schultz left Porsche and joined bb-Auto of Rainer Buchmann where he would go on to design the Mercedes-Benz CW311 concept which was touted as the successor to the Mercedes-Benz 300SL. The concept was built and promoted by bb and had, somewhat illegal, Mercedes badging. After positive coverage in magazines that took limelight away from the new BMW M1, the badging gained approval from Mercedes.

Isdera was founded in 1982 in Leonberg, Germany with the intent to put the CW311 into production after a deal with Mercedes-Benz. Its first car, called the Spyder which was an open top sports car based on the CW311, was presented in the same year. The Spyder was powered by a modified Mercedes-Benz engine generating 185 PS (136 kW; 182 hp). A new variant having an uprated 3.0-litre Inline-6 engine was introduced in 1987. The Spyder was renamed as the Spyder 033i and the Spyder 036i to indicate the difference between the offered engines and the use of electronic fuel injection in the engines (with the "i" designation).

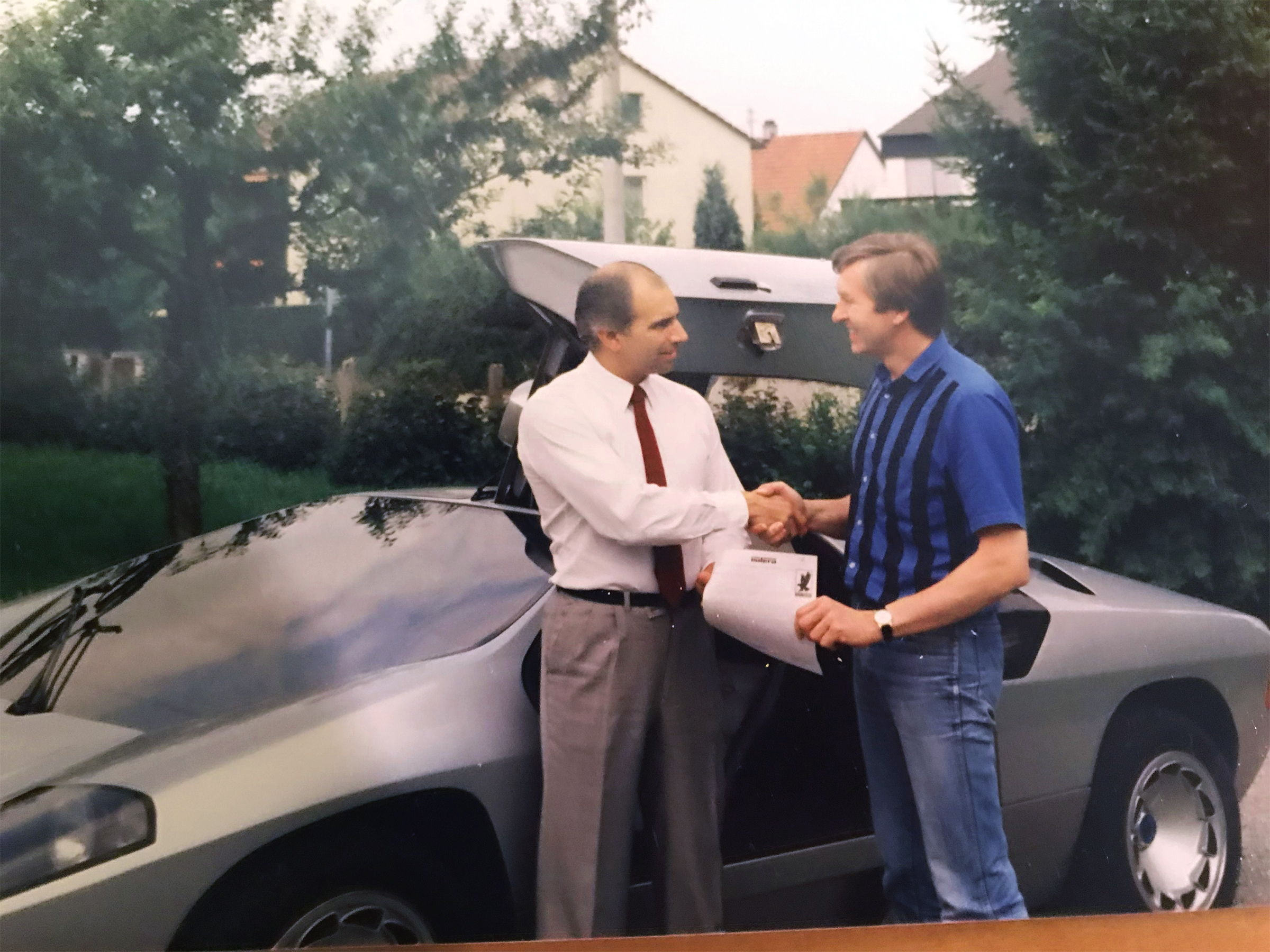
Eberhard Schultz and Fred Dellis standing in front of an Imperator 108i

The CW311 would finally see production in 1984 as the Imperator 108i. The Imperator 108i was offered with a choice of Mercedes-Benz V8 engines having different displacements, ranging from 5.0-litres to 6.0-litres. The car received a facelift in 1991 which added changes in ventilation to improve cooling, some visual changes and changes to the exhaust system to pass stringent safety tests. A total of 30 Imperator 108is would be made before production ended in 1993.

In 1993, Isdera introduced the Commendatore 112i. It had many advanced and unique features at the time such as two sets of gull-wing doors, and an automatic air brake. The Commendatore 112i could accelerate from 0 to 100 km/h in 4.0 seconds, and had a top speed of 342 km/h (213 mph). The car had a mid-mounted Mercedes-Benz 6.0L V12 engine generating 408 PS (300 kW; 402 hp) and a 6-speed manual transmission. The car weighed 1,450 kg (3,197 lb). The 112i was featured in the 1997 video game Need for Speed II.

Isdera planned a limited production run of the Commendatore 112i like its predecessor and quoted that each car would take six months to complete. The car was not functional when it was introduced. The development of the car reportedly cost a total of €4,000,000. This combined with the ongoing economic recession in South Asia, particularly the bursting of Japan's bubble economy, pushed the company into bankruptcy shortly after the car's introduction as the major investments came from Japan. The company was then bought by Swiss investors under whom Schultz completed the car in order to make it driveable on the road.

In 1999, the Commendatore 112i was updated and renamed to "Silver Arrow C112i" by the new management. On the exterior, the updated car had conventional side-view mirrors and had silver five-spoke Mercedes-Benz alloy wheels instead of the gold BBS units. The engine was a 6.9-litre Mercedes-Benz M120 V12 unit, which generated a total of 455 kW (619 PS; 610 hp). Interestingly, there was no Isdera badging on the car and it had Mercedes-Benz badging instead. The Silver Arrow C112i was unveiled at the 1999 Frankfurt Motor Show.

The Silver Arrow was bought by a Swiss businessman Albert Klöti at a price of €1,500,000 in 2000. Albert kept the car for 5 years after offering it on eBay for sale in October 2005 for US$3,000,000. The car failed to sell at the auction.

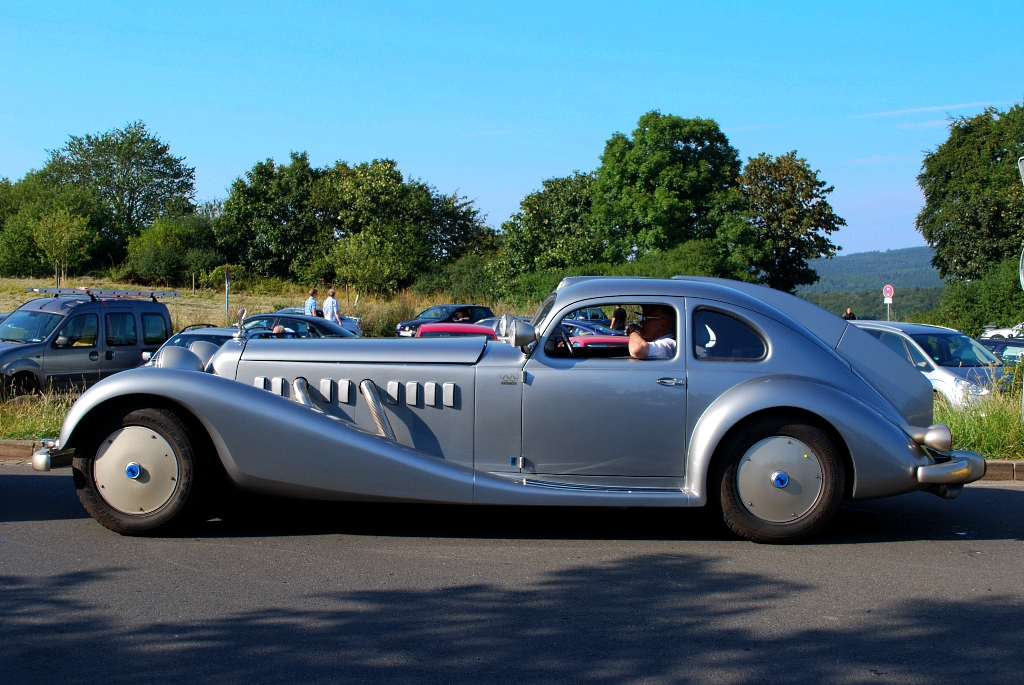
Isdera Autobahnkurier

In 2006, Eberhard Schulz introduced the Autobahnkurier AK116i as a private project, a retro-styled vehicle based on the Mercedes-Benz W126 S-Class and powered by two Mercedes-Benz V8 engines – one for each axle – from the W126 series 500 SE. The resulting power plant is a 10-litre unit rated at 600 PS (441 kW; 592 hp) and 900 N⋅m (664 lb⋅ft) of torque. The top speed was limit to 242 km/h (150 mph) due to excessive fuel consumption of the massive engine over speeds of 250 km/h (155 mph). The design which resembled a touring car from the 1930s, was inspired from the Bugatti Royale and the one-off 1936 Mercedes-Benz 540K Autobahn Kurier. The car featured a full leather interior with creature-comforts and a marble dashboard.

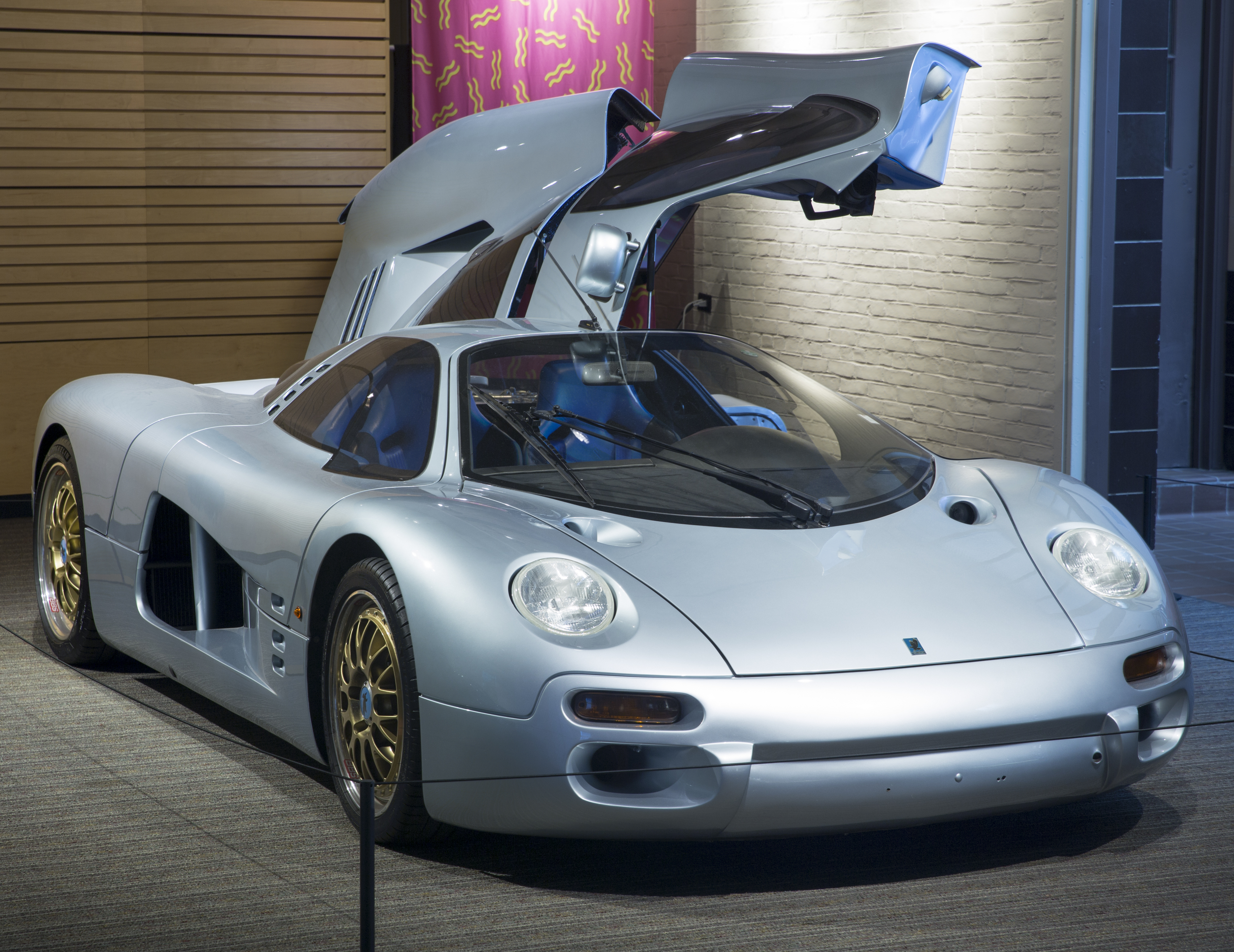
Isdera Commendatore 112i at the Saratoga Auto Museum

In 2016, the Silver Arrow C112i from Albert Klöti was bought back to Germany in was restored back to its original form and made appearances at selected car shows. Subsequently, on 13 February 2021, the Isdera Commendatore 112i was sold at auction at Sotheby's France in Paris for €1,113,125.

In 2017, Isdera entered into a partnership with Chinese electric vehicle startup WM Motor to design and produce electric cars. In 2018 the Isdera Commendatore GT was developed to support the marketing activities of WM Motors for the EX5 Pro which was designed by Isdera and co-branded Isdera. Both cars were unveiled together at the Auto China 2018. Like preceding Isdera automobiles, the GT also employs gull-wing doors. The co-branded Isdera EX5 Pro was produced in a small batch of only a few hundred cars and sold in the Chinese market. In 2020 the cooperation with WM Motor ended.

In 2021, the Isdera brand was fully acquired by Chinese Xinghui Automotive Group and given the official Chinese name 鹰兹.

In 2024, ISDERA had set up a new R&D center in TaiCang, China, as well a new construction center in Anhui, China.

In 2025, Isdera AG filed for bankruptcy.

This bankruptcy affected the German-registered company Isdera AG. However, the brand continues under a separate Chinese-owned entity, Isdera Automotive, which was not part of the insolvency proceedings. On June 30, 2025, Isdera Automotive, operated by Yingzi Automotive Technology (Anhui) Co., Ltd., held the global launch ceremony of its first in-house–developed model, the handmade super sports car L’AQUILA. The event took place at the New Energy Auto Parts Industrial Park in Yingjiang District, Anqing, and was attended by Zhang Zhao, chairman of Earth Moon Technology Group, and Song Wenfang, chairman of Yingzi Automotive. The two companies also discussed future cooperation in the Middle East market.

== Models ==
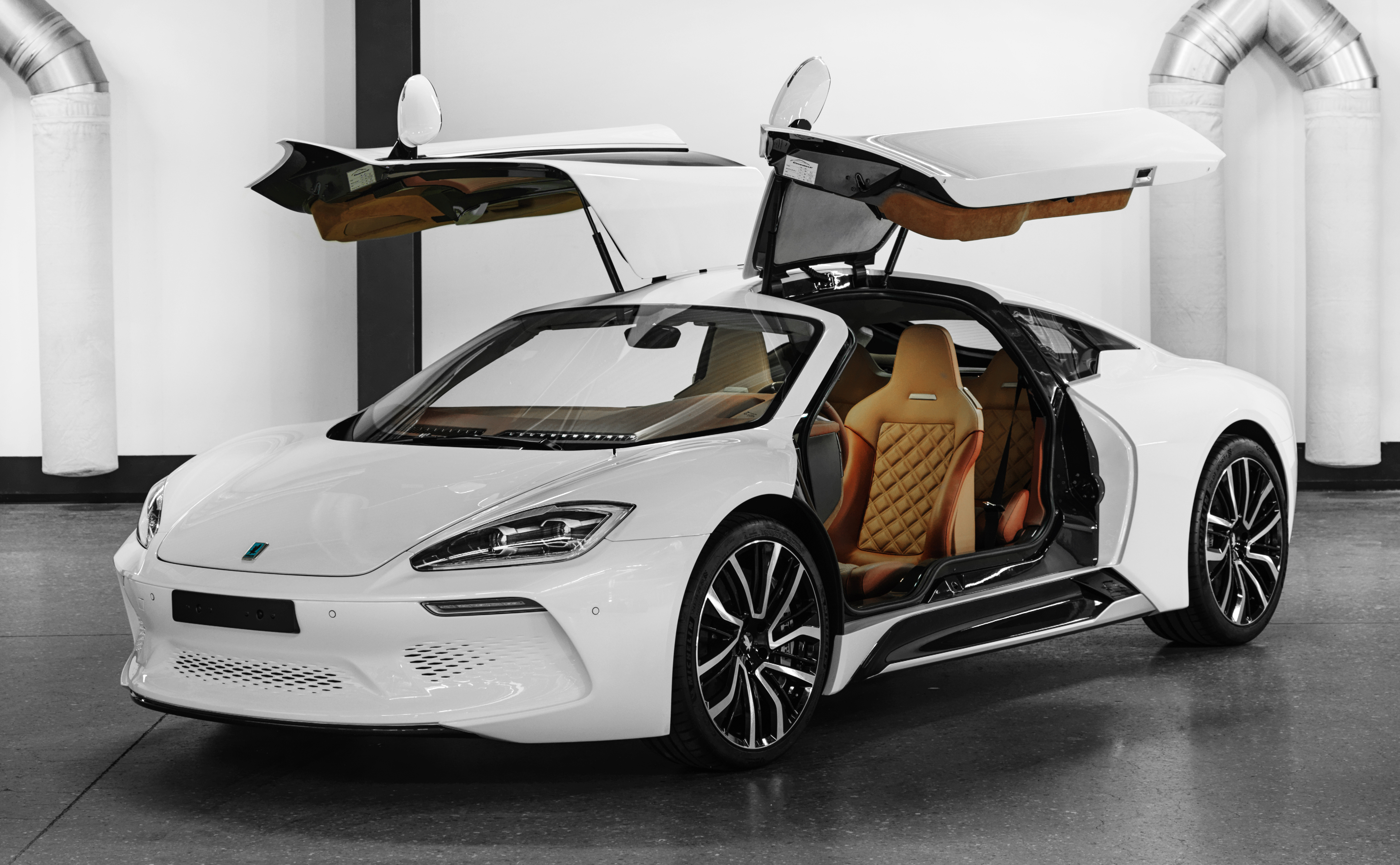
Isdera Commendatore GT (2018)

- 1969: Isdera Erator GTE
- 1982: Isdera Spyder 036i
- 1984: Isdera Imperator 108i
- 1993: Isdera Commendatore 112i
- 2006: Isdera Autobahnkurier AK116
- 2018: Isdera Commendatore GT
- 2025: Isdera L'Aquila

== See also ==
- Lotec
