= Isdera Commendatore 112i =

Mid-engine concept car developed by German automobile manufacturer Isdera GmbH

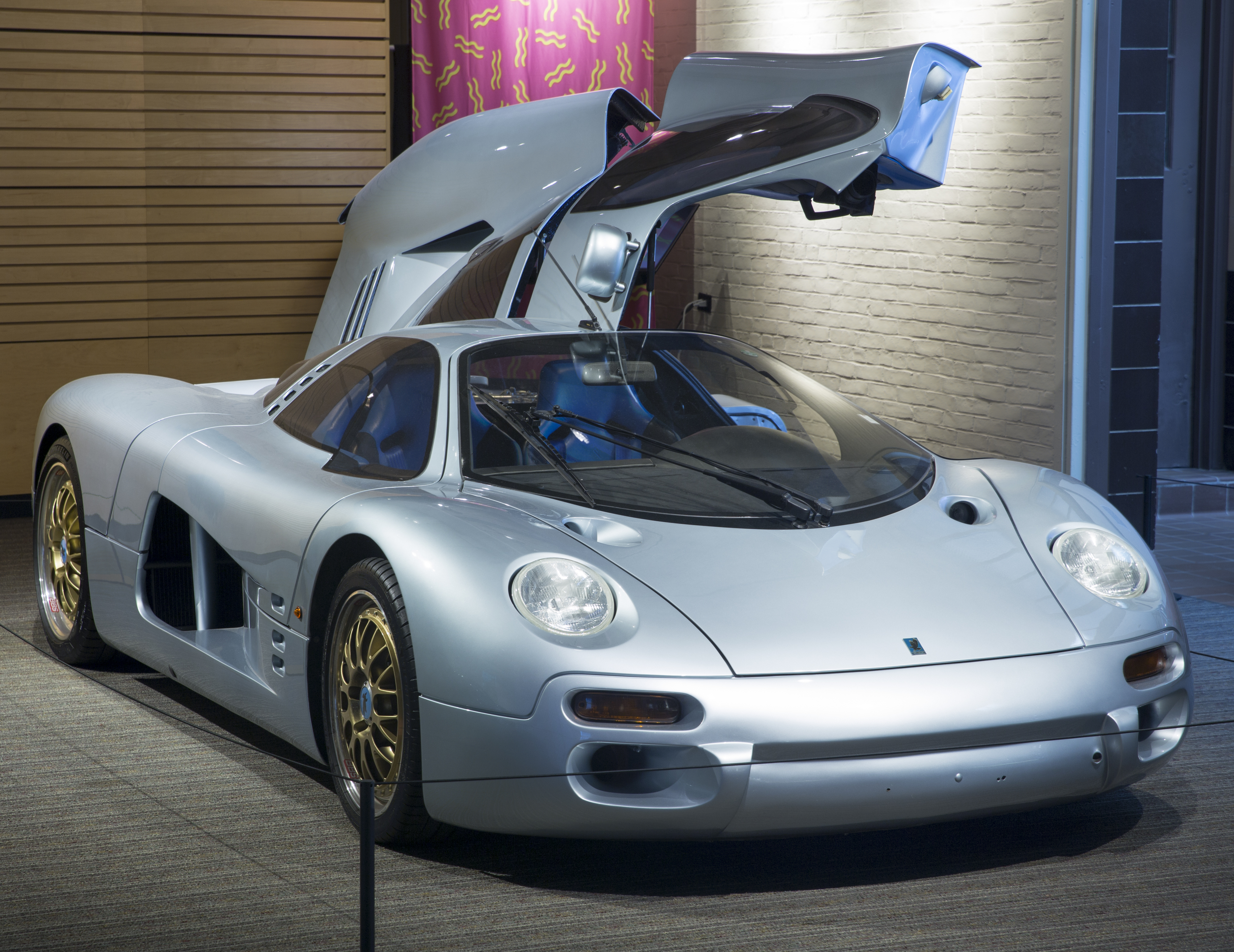
- The Commendatore 112i on display at the Saratoga Auto Museum, Radwood Exhibit

Overview
- Manufacturer: Isdera GmbH
- Production: 1993
- Assembly: Germany: Leonberg
- Designer: Eberhard Schultz

Body and chassis
- Class: Concept car (S)
- Body style: 2-door coupé
- Layout: Rear mid-engine, rear-wheel-drive

Powertrain
- Engine: 6.0 L Mercedes-Benz M120 V12; 6.9 L Mercedes-Benz M120 V12
- Transmission: 6-speed manual

Dimensions
- Length: 4,622.8 mm (182.0 in)
- Width: 1,866.9 mm (73.5 in)
- Height: 1,031.2 mm (40.6 in)
- Kerb weight: 1,477 kg (3,256 lb); 1,550 kg (3,417 lb) (Silver Arrow)

Chronology
- Predecessor: Isdera Imperator 108i
- Successor: Isdera Commendatore GT (spiritual)

The Isdera Commendatore 112i is a concept car conceived and developed by the German low-volume automobile manufacturer Isdera. Introduced at the 1993 Frankfurt Motor Show, the 112i featured a compact and sleek aerodynamic body. It was intended to be the successor to the Imperator 108i, but due to financial constraints, the company went bankrupt, and only one prototype was completed. However, there is one more example with white color had been built "unofficially".

== History and development ==
After the Imperator 108i had ended production in 1993, Isdera was working on the development of a new model. In 1991 a V12-powered Mercedes-Benz C112 was presented, but despite 700 deposits, the company did not produce it. In 1989, the first clay models took shape and development work was carried out through 1993. The new car, called the Commendatore 112i, was named in honour of Ferrari's founder Enzo Ferrari, who was called Il Commendatore, meaning the Knight Commander in Italian language.

The sleek design drew inspiration from the famous Group C race cars. Eberhard Schultz, the company's founder, engaged engineers and technicians from Mercedes-Benz with approval from the company in the development of the car. There were plans to enter the car in Le Mans racing, which was a reason for the car's elongated styling, but the idea never materialised.

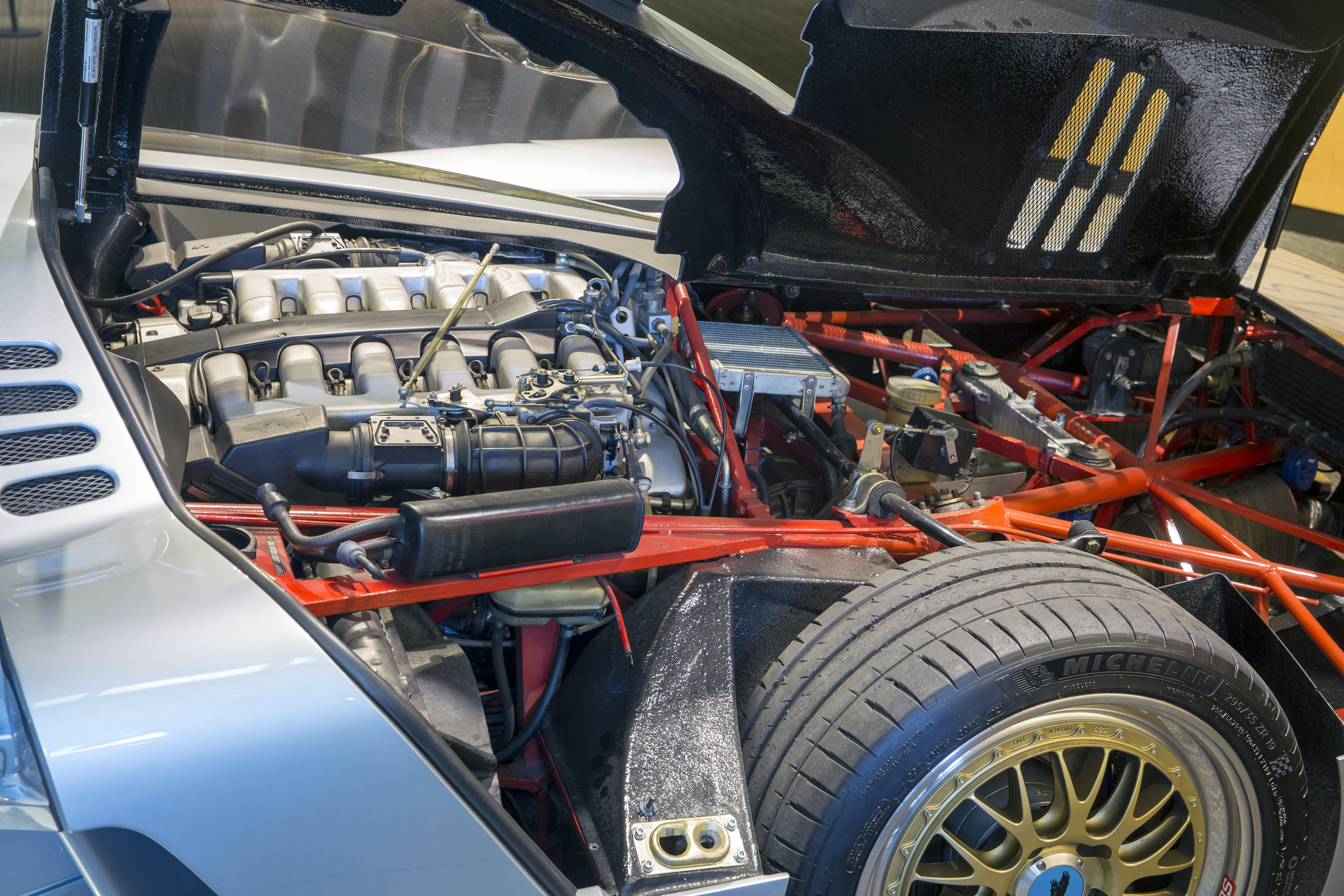
The Mercedes-Benz M120 engine used in the 112i

The 112i had a 6-speed manual transmission which is a modified 5-speed unit from Ruf Automobile, the ABS brakes (which measured 330 mm (13 in) and the front and 305 mm (12 in) at the rear) and the suspension system were shared with the Porsche 928 while the head lamps were shared with the Porsche 968. The car has handbuilt fibreglass body work on a tubular steel spaceframe chassis and has 18-inch gold BBS alloy wheels fitted with tyres measuring 255/35 ZR18 at the front and 295/35 ZR19 at the rear. The large side intakes help cool the engine. The engine is a 6.0-litre Mercedes-Benz M120 V12 unit (first used in the Mercedes-Benz C112 and later used in the Mercedes-Benz SL600 AMG and the Pagani Zonda S). It was modified to cope with the manual transmission as the original unit only came with an automatic gearbox. The modifications included an in-house developed flywheel and a Bosch ECU. The engine generated a maximum power output of 300 kW (408 PS; 402 hp) at 5,200 rpm and 580 N⋅m (428 lb⋅ft) of torque at 3,800 rpm.

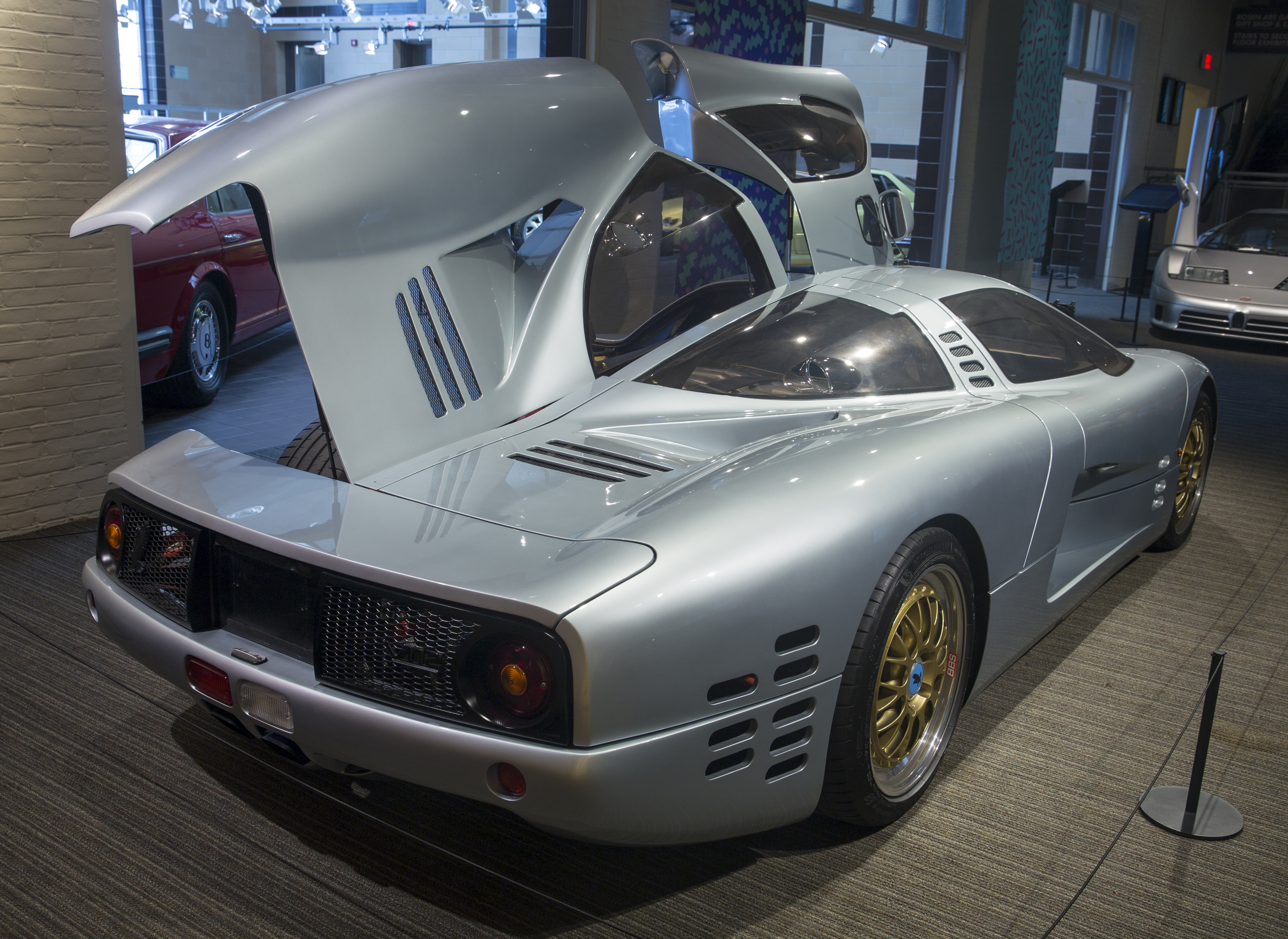
The gull-wing engine cover and doors were a special feature of the 112i

The 112i had advanced technologies at the time, including gull-wing doors, a gull-wing engine cover for easier access to the engine, a velocity sensitive chassis developed in collaboration with BBS and Bilstein which lowered the car by 76 mm (3 in) at high speeds, an active suspension system and an electronically controlled airbrake.

The 112i retained the periscope rear-view mirror from the Imperator 108i instead of conventional side-view mirrors. It has a flat underbody for improved aerodynamics. The long tail of the car also improved airflow over it. The airbrake raises in an upright position while braking, acting as a wind deflector to help slow the car down (similar to a parachute). The car had a drag coefficient of Cd=0.306 when tested in the Mercedes-Benz wind tunnel.

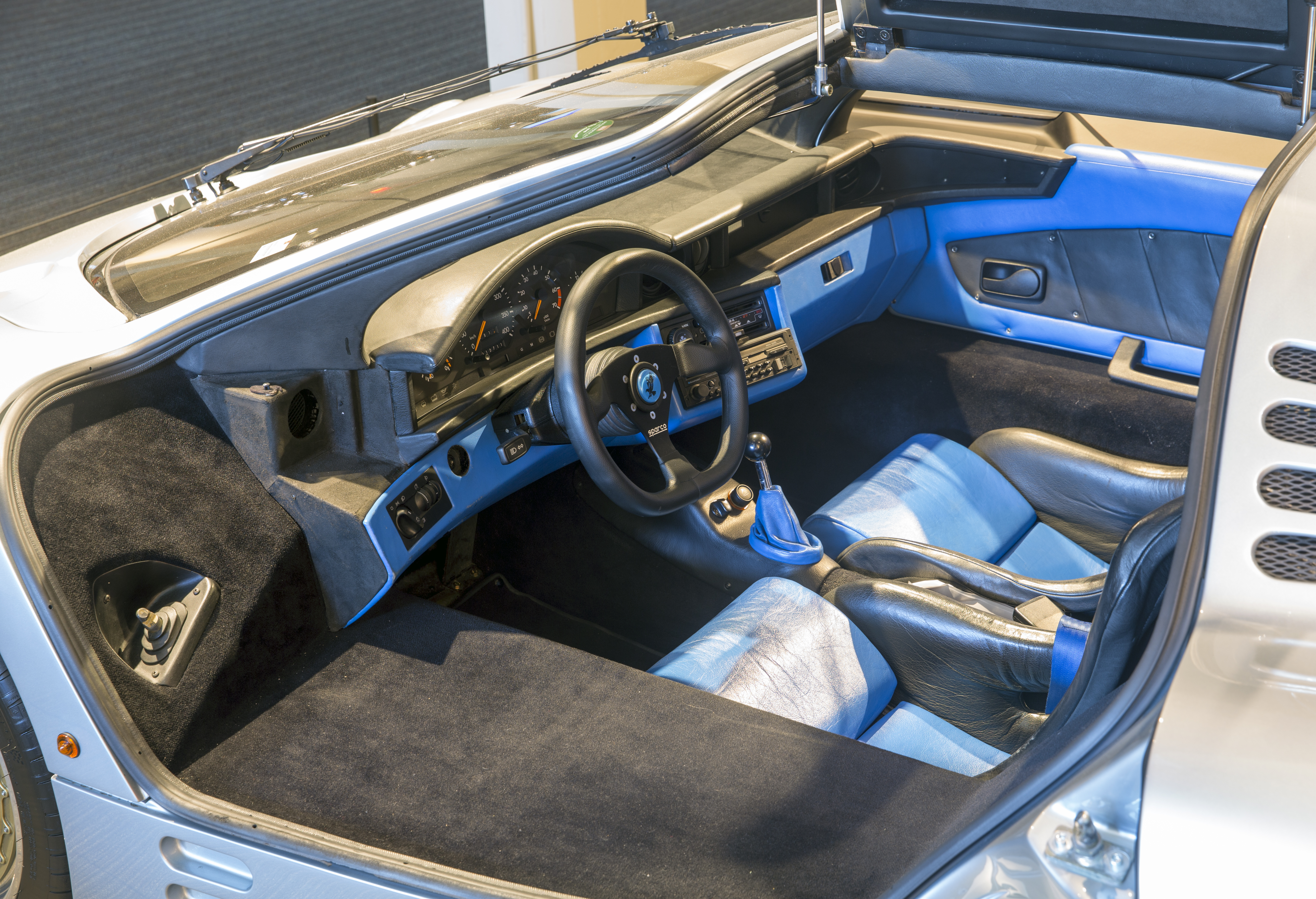
The 112i has custom made two-tone black and blue trimmed interior

The interior of the car was mostly custom made and contained two tone blue and black leather upholstery, along with RECARO leather sports seats. The car had wide door sills which housed the two fuel tanks. The dials and other instrumentation (excluding the steering wheel which was from OMP) were from Mercedes-Benz and the speedometer read up to 400 km/h (249 mph).

Isdera planned a limited production run of the 112i like its predecessor and quoted that each car would take six months to complete. The car was not functional when it was introduced. The development of the car reportedly cost a total of €4,000,000. This combined with the ongoing economic recession in South Asia, particularly the bursting of Japan's bubble economy, pushed the company into bankruptcy shortly after the car's introduction as the major investments came from Japan. The company was then bought by Swiss investors, under whom Schultz completed the car in order to make it driveable on the road.

Although officially only one car was completed, Isdera completed a second subframe before its closure which was bought by an enthusiast who also purchased the original body moulds and tooling to build another unit of the 112i in collaboration with Schultz. The project was completed within a span of six years. Schultz withdrew from the project over a dispute on proposed design changes and later a re-emerging Isdera would also deny its existence. The second car is finished in a shade of white called Light Ivory and has a light grey interior with most of the switch gear sourced from Porsche. The design of the exhaust system also differs from the original as the car has a side exit exhaust exiting from beneath the doors.

=== Later use ===
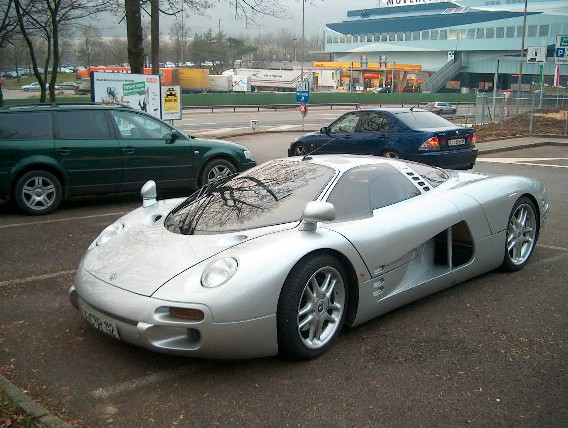
The 1999 "Silver Arrow C112i" modified from the Commendatore 112i. It featured conventional side-view mirrors instead of the original concept car's roof-mounted periscope rear-view mirror.

Six years later in 1999, the car was updated and renamed to "Silver Arrow C112i" by a Swiss businessman. On the exterior, the updated car had conventional side-view mirrors and had silver five-spoke Mercedes-Benz alloy wheels instead of the gold BBS units. The engine was a 6.9-litre Mercedes-Benz M120 V12 unit, which generated a total of 455 kW (619 PS; 610 hp). Interestingly, the car featured Mercedes-Benz badging instead of Isdera badging. The Silver Arrow was unveiled at the 1999 Frankfurt Motor Show.

The Silver Arrow was bought by Swiss businessman Albert Klöti at a price of €1,500,000. Klöti kept the car for 5 years after offering it for sale on eBay for US$3,000,000 in 2005. The car failed to sell, after which it was sold back to Isdera in 2016. The owner of the car, along with Schultz and the Isdera Classic team, then restored the car back to its original form and name and made appearances at motor shows. On 13 February 2021, the Isdera Commendatore 112i was sold at a RM Sotheby's auction in Paris, France for €1,113,125. Isdera AG as the owner of the brand Commendatore has introduced the Commendatore GT in 2018 applying modern tech and redefining the iconic design language of the Commendatore 112i.

== Performance ==
The Isdera Commendatore 112i was claimed to accelerate to 100 km/h (62 mph) in 4.7 seconds and having a top speed of 341 km/h (212 mph). The Silver Arrow C112i was claimed to have a top speed of 370 km/h (230 mph) during testing.

== Other media ==
The Isdera Commendatore 112i was featured in the 1997 Electronic Arts racing video game Need for Speed II. The Silver Arrow C112i was featured in a short documentary on Albert Klöti.
