= Commander Evans =

Commander Evans may refer to:

- Ernest E. Evans, commander of USN destroyer USS Johnston (DD-557)
- Edward Evans, 1st Baron Mountevans,
- Samuel Evans (naval officer), commander of USS Hornet (1805 sloop)
