= The American Presidency with Bill Clinton (TV series) =

2022 TV series

- Genre: Documentary
- Presented by: Bill Clinton
- Original language: English
- No. of seasons: 1
- No. of episodes: 6

Production
- Executive producer: Bill Clinton
- Camera setup: Multi-camera
- Production company: Category 6 Media

Original release
- Network: History
- Release: May 22 – June 20, 2022

The American Presidency with Bill Clinton is a 2022 historical documentary series by History hosted by Bill Clinton. It premiered on May 30, 2022, for six episodes concluding on June 6, 2022. The series explores the topics of race, extremism, economic issues, the struggle for rights, presidential vision, and global power. The series is also executive produced by Clinton. All episodes included commentary from Jon Meacham, Annette Gordon-Reed, Douglas Brinkley, Edna Medford Green, H. W. Brands, and George Takei. In May 2020, Clinton signed a deal with History to produce and host the show.

== Episodes ==
No.	Title	Original air date	US viewers (millions)
1	"Separate But Unequal"	30 May 2022	.515
How presidential action helped the United States have less racism.
2	"Presidential Vision"	6 June 2022	.291
How presidents and their visionary goals shaped the country and the world.
3	"Building the Economy"	6 June 2022	N/A
How presidential action can create greater opportunity for the people.
4	"Extremism"	13 June 2022	N/A
How presidents have reacted to extinguish and sometimes fan the flames of extremism. What we can learn about extremism from the past and how to avoid it in the future.
5	"We the people"	20 June 2022	N/A
Presidential decision-making in the face of turning points for many citizens who have been left out - the enslaved, Indigenous Americans, women, and immigrants.
6	"Becoming a Superpower"	20 June 2022	N/A
How well have we exercised our own power?
