= Mercedes-Benz Vision One-Eleven =

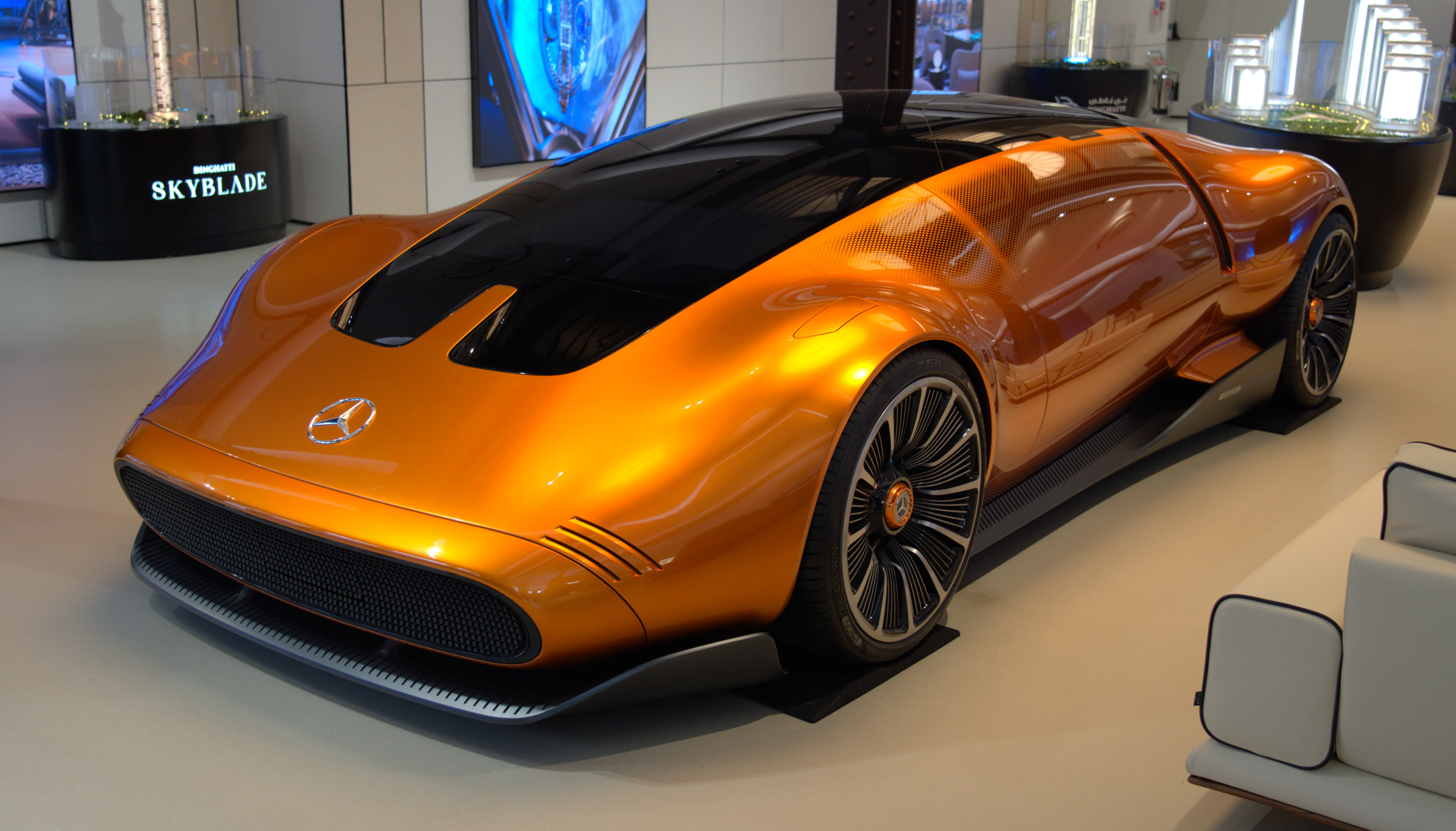

Overview
- Manufacturer: Mercedes-Benz
- Production: 2023

Body and chassis
- Class: Concept sports car
- Body style: 2-door coupé
- Layout: Mid-engine, all-wheel-drive
- Doors: Gull-wing

Powertrain
- Engine: Dual YASA axial flux motors

Mercedes-Benz Vision One-Eleven is a concept sports car by Mercedes-Benz. Featuring the so-called "one-bow" design, it drew inspiration from Mercedes-Benz C111. The car has lounge mode and race mode. In lounge mode, the seats are merged into the interior, where sills, centre tunnel and luggage compartment form a single unit. In race mode with the backrest upright, the interior is reduced.

The car debuted in 2023 at the Mercedes-Benz International Design Center in Carlsbad, California.
