= Bruno Sacco =

Italian-German automobile designer (1933–2024)

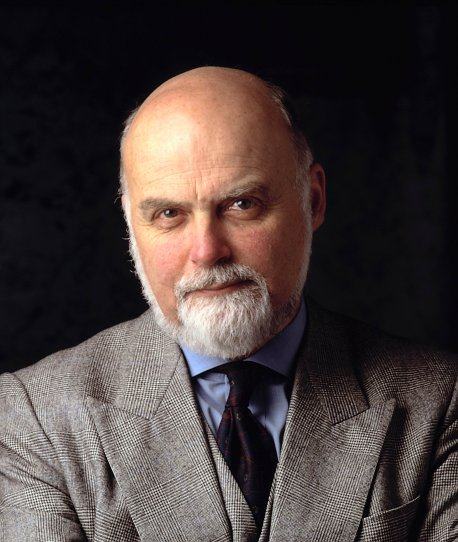
- Sacco in 2007
- Born: 12 November 1933; Udine, Italy
- Died: 19 September 2024 (aged 90); Sindelfingen, Baden-Württemberg, Germany
- Citizenship: Italian, German
- Education: Polytechnic University of Turin
- Spouse: Annemarie Sacco
- Engineering career
- Discipline: Automotive design
- Significant design: Mercedes-Benz W201; Mercedes-Benz W126; Mercedes-Benz SEC; Mercedes-Benz W124; Mercedes-Benz W210; Mercedes-Benz W140; Mercedes-Benz C111; Mercedes-Benz W123; Mercedes-Benz SL-Class (R129); Mercedes-Benz S-Class (W220); Mercedes-Benz SL-Class (R230)

Bruno Sacco (12 November 1933 – 19 September 2024) was an Italian-German automobile designer and chief engineer, who served as the head of styling at the Daimler-Benz AG, the German manufacturer of Mercedes-Benz automobiles and trucks, from 1975 to 1999. Since Bruno Sacco was hired as a Mercedes-Benz stylist in 1958, his career and contributions to their vehicles' industrial design spanned more than four decades.

== Biography ==
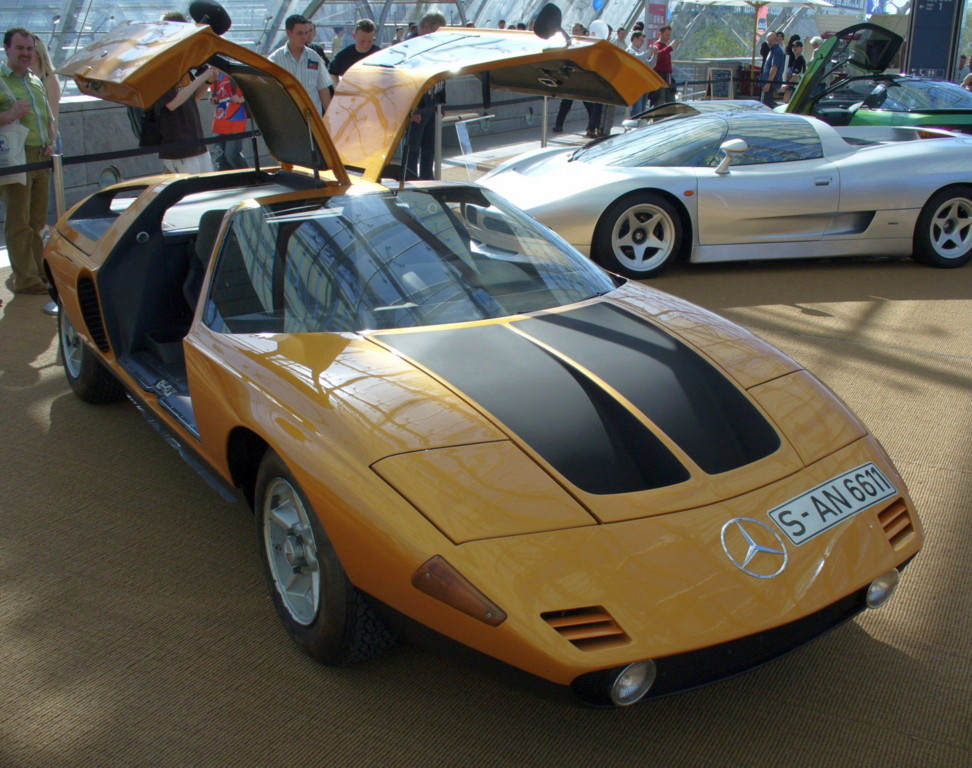
The Mercedes-Benz C111, with its gullwing doors ajar. This Wankel engined concept car was one of Sacco's projects prior to his ascension to chief stylist at Daimler-Benz.

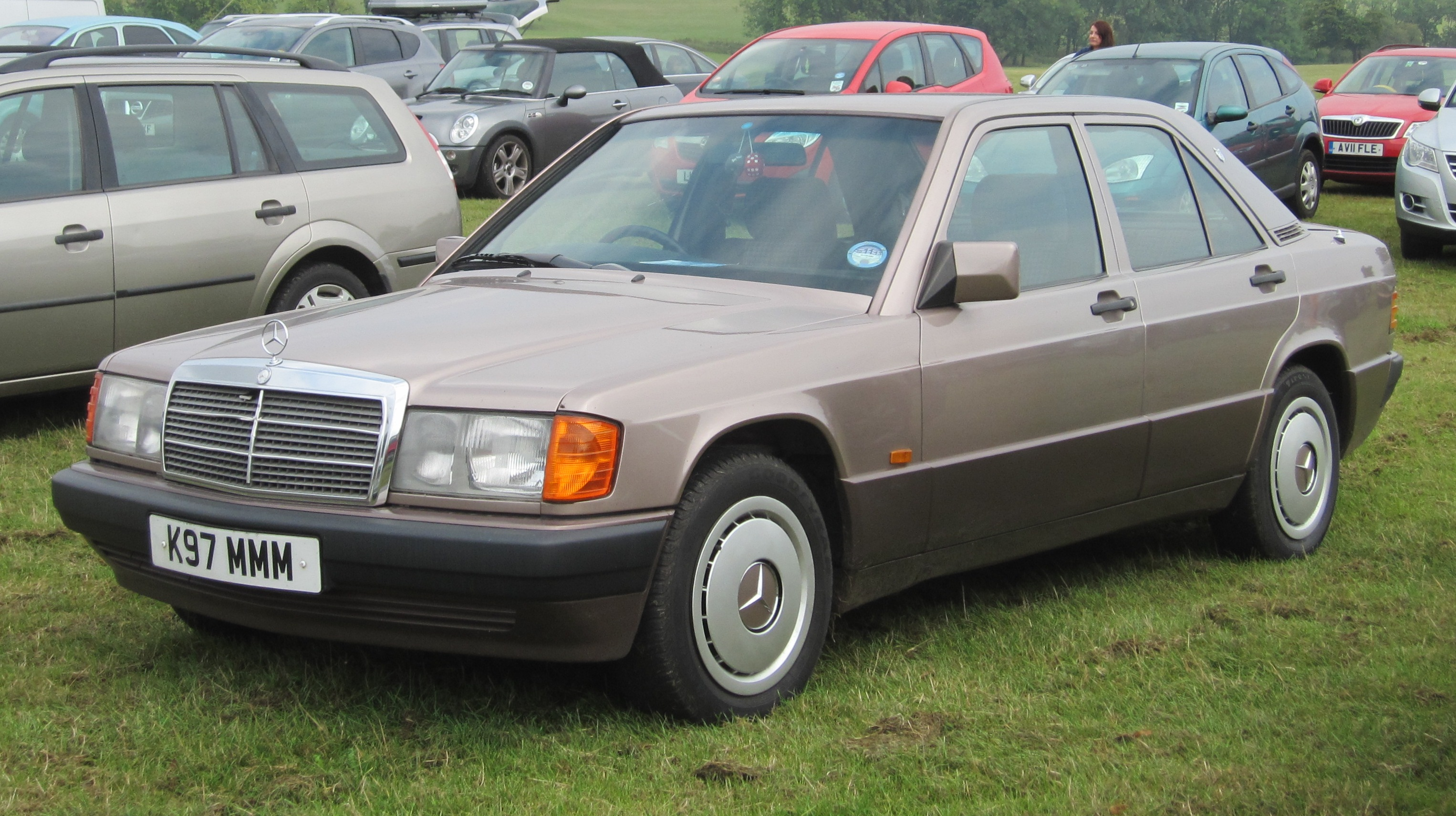
A Mercedes-Benz 190 (W201), Sacco's "most significant" design

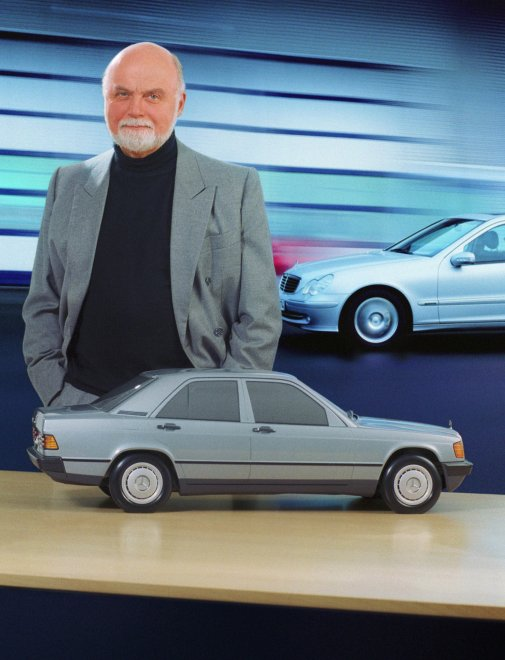
Bruno Sacco with a W201-model

According to Sacco himself, he was first inspired towards car design as an eighteen-year-old, after seeing a Raymond Loewy-styled 1950 Studebaker Commander Regal as he cycled through the streets of Tarvisio in 1951. Afterwards, he could not get the car out of his head, and "knew [his] life had been decided."

After studying mechanical engineering at the Polytechnic University of Turin, he first sought work at the renowned Ghia and Pininfarina carrozzerie (coachbuilders), but moved to Germany when his efforts proved unsuccessful. Daimler-Benz hired him as a stylist in 1958, and although he intended to stay only briefly, his marriage to Berlinerin Annemarie Ibe in 1959, and the birth of their daughter Marina the following year, made him reconsider his future.

Sacco rose through the corporate ranks at Daimler-Benz over the next fifteen years, becoming chief engineer in 1974, before taking over from Friedrich Geiger as head of the Daimler-Benz styling center at Sindelfingen in 1975. For the next quarter century, until he retired in 1999, he was responsible for the design of every Mercedes road car, bus, and truck. Among his numerous works are the C111 concept car, three successive generations of the S‑Class luxury saloons, (the W126, W140, and W220), the R129 SL convertible, the C-Class W202 compact executive car, the W124 and W210 versions of the E-Class sedan, the CLK and SLK sports cars, the M-Class luxury sport utility vehicle, and second generation C‑Class W203. Sacco made significant contributions to the design of the Mercedes W123, the best selling Mercedes-Benz ever, as well as his very last design, the R230 SL convertible (in 1997).

Sacco's favourite design, because of its significance to the company's history, is the Mercedes-Benz 190 introduced in 1982, while he confessed dissatisfaction with the 1991 W140 S-Class, of which he considered the 'greenhouse' (upper body) to be "four inches [10 cm] too tall". In his retirement he had given up his old red SLK convertible in favour of a dark blue Mercedes-Benz 560SEC (C126).

In addition to the 1989 C126 560SEC, he owned a 2019 C238 E-Class Coupé, also in dark blue.

Sacco died on 19 September 2024, at the age of 90, in Sindelfingen, a suburb of Stuttgart, where he had lived.

== Design themes ==
A Mercedes-Benz must always look like a Mercedes-Benz.

— Bruno Sacco.

It took several years for Sacco to fully understand the culture at Daimler-Benz, since by his own attestation, there were no "written [styling or design] laws".

He has long advocated "horizontal homogeneity" and "vertical affinity", terms he used to describe the continuity and homogeneity of Mercedes designs. Horizontal homogeneity is the common styling cue between different models in the manufacturer's range; there should be a strong visual relationship between the smallest and largest cars. Vertical affinity is the requirement for cars not to be rendered stylistically obsolete by their successors, ensuring greater timelessness of design. Sacco felt this was of special importance to Mercedes, whose cars' reputation for longevity meant that their typical life cycle was 20 to 30 years.

== Awards ==
Sacco accumulated numerous awards and honours during his career; his overall body of work has been acknowledged by Car Magazine's "Designer's Designer" (1996) as chosen by forty of his peers, the EyesOn Design Lifetime Design Achievement Award (1997), and the Raymond Loewy Foundation's Lucky Strike Designer Award (1997). He was shortlisted as one of the 25 Car Designers of the Century in 1999, and was inducted into the Automotive Hall of Fame in 2006 and the European Automotive Hall of Fame in 2007.

In his homeland, he was awarded the Grand Official Order of Merit of the Republic in 1991, and received an honorary doctorate from the University of Udine in 2002.

== Books ==
- Sacco, Bruno (1988). Mercedes-Benz design: a look at the past, a look at the present, and some incidental observations on the design of other automobiles. Montvale, New Jersey: Mercedes-Benz of North America.
