= Siva S160 Spyder =

Overview
- Manufacturer: Siva Engineering
- Also called: Siva S160 GT
- Production: From 1971

Body and chassis
- Body style: 2-door coupe
- Layout: RR layout
- Doors: Gullwing doors
- Related: Volkswagen Beetle

The Siva S160 Spyder is an automobile which was produced during the 1970s in Great Britain by Siva Engineering.

Conceived as a Hillman Imp-engined GT car for British sports car manufacturer Marcos, the car was ultimately re-designed to become the Siva S160 Spyder. The S160 debuted at the 1971 Racing Car Show, utilizing a Volkswagen Beetle floor pan and running gear and featuring a gullwing coupé body. It was offered as a complete car or as a bare bodyshell. A total of twelve S160s were produced.

== Siva Spyder in miniature ==
A model of the Siva Spyder was included as number 41 in the Matchbox Superfast range from 1973 to 1978.
