= Eagle Cars =

English automobile company

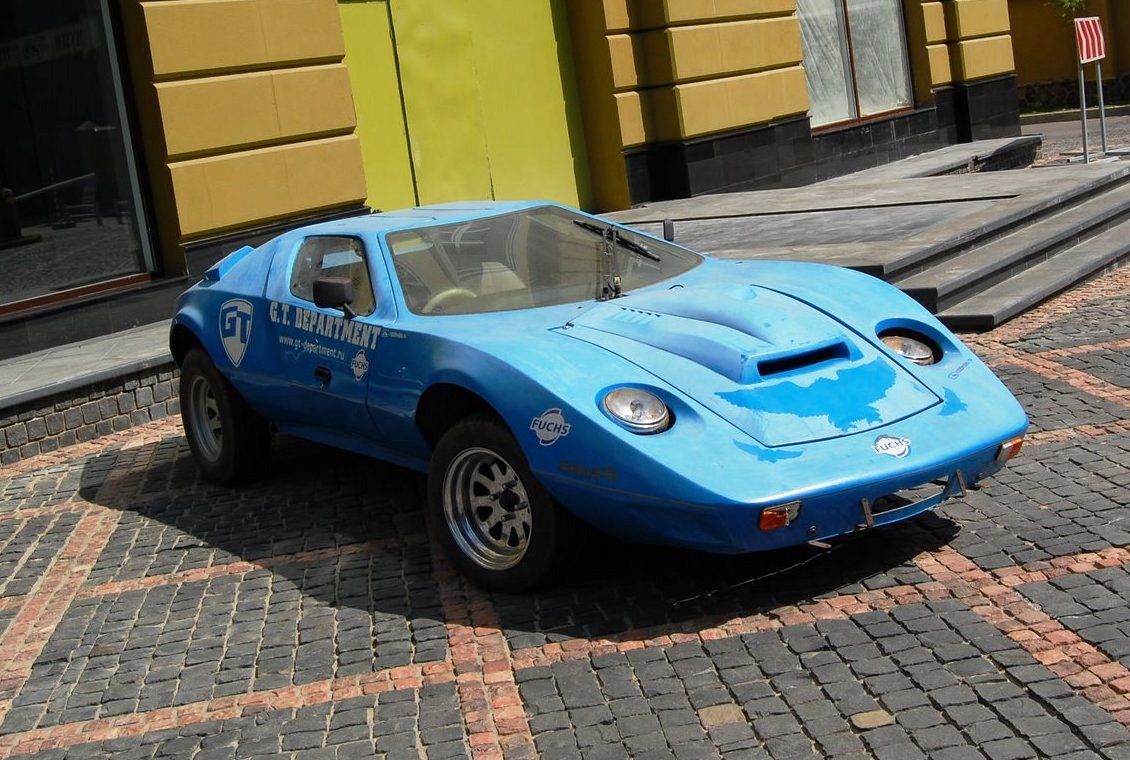
Later, front-engined Eagle SS

Eagle Cars Limited was an English company, based in Lancing, West Sussex, originally operated by Allen Breeze, although it has undergone a number of ownership changes since. Originally making a Jeep lookalike called the RV, between 1981 and 1998 they built several iterations of a gull-winged car called the Eagle SS. The SS was based on an American kit car called the Cimbria (itself based on the earlier Sterling, which in turn was a copy of the British Nova), and was brought to the UK by Tim Dutton (of Dutton Cars). In 1988 Eagle Cars moved inland, to nearby Storrington.

== Company history ==
Founded by Allen Breeze, the company was sold to trials motorcyclist Rob Budd in 1989. Eagle Cars Limited changed location again in the nineties, moving to Walberton (still in West Sussex).

The company officially ceased trading in 1998, but production had ended long before. The moulds and rights to Eagle's various cars are currently in the hands of a variety of other companies. The SS moulds were sold by Tim Naylor of TEAC Sports Cars in 2012 on eBay to a buyer from Wexford, and nothing more has been heard of them since. TEAC has ceased to exist and all trace of the SS moulds have disappeared. The RV moulds were apparently seized by bailiffs and have also vanished. All attempts to trace the whereabouts of the various Eagle moulds have drawn a blank as of November 2012. Anyone knowing where they are should contact the Eagle Owners Club.

== Eagle SS ==
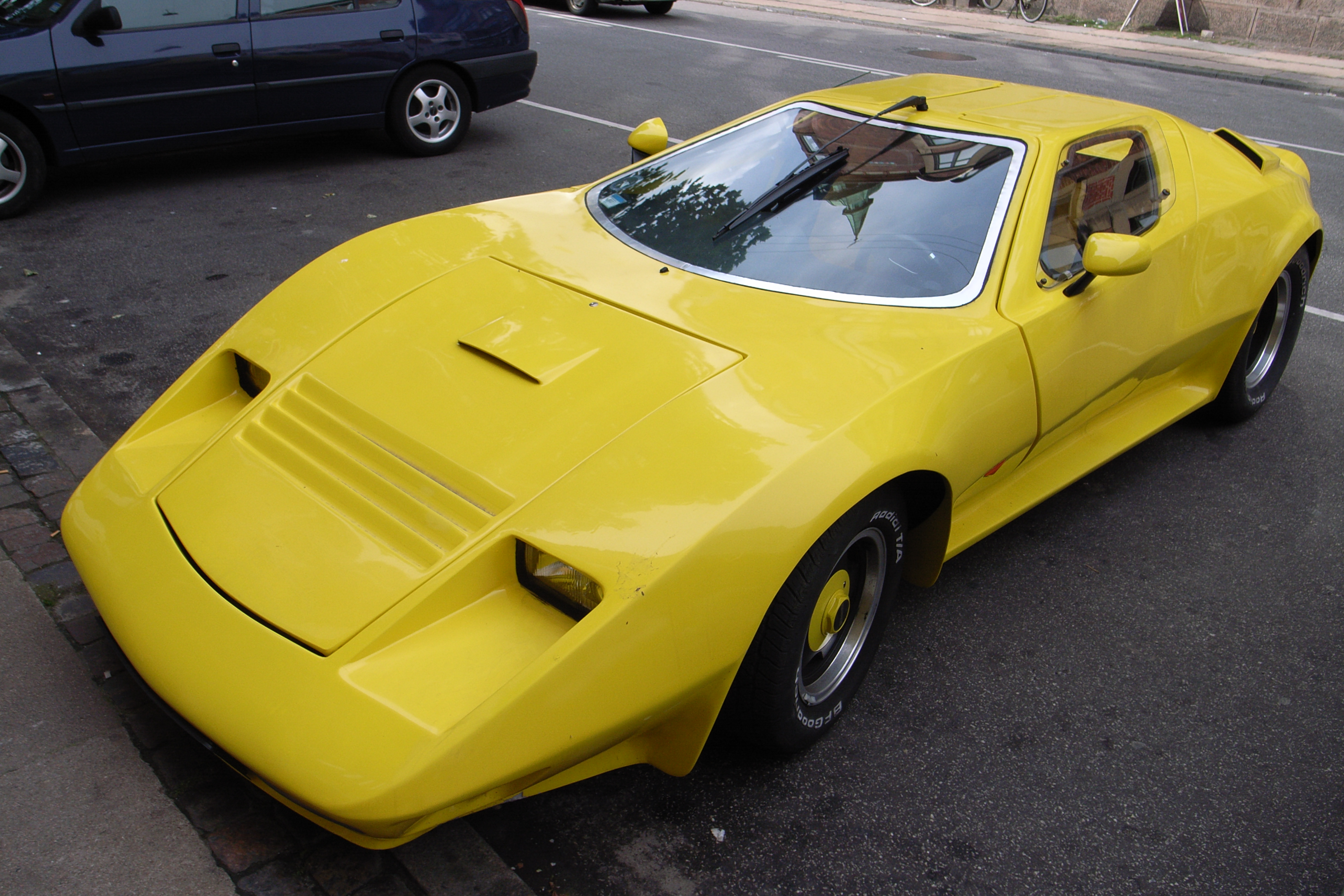
Late version with different headlights

As with so many of its kit car brethren, the dramatic bodywork of the Eagle SS hid humble VW Beetle underpinnings. The bodywork was from glass fiber-reinforced plastic (GFRP), molded in a single colour. The total weight of a finished SS was promised to be around 750 kg (1,653 lb), which meant performance was considerably improved over that of a standard Beetle. A top speed of 200 km/h (124 mph) with a tuned VW engine was also promised. The most obvious difference to the Cimbria, upon which the Eagle SS was based, was the Cimbria's flip-up headlights: Eagle chose to equip their version with round, rear-folding headlights in the style of the Porsche 928.

Three basic versions were produced:

- The MkI has a separate internal roll cage, long nose, windows hinged at the front edge. Both bonnet and boot lids had ribbed sections, boot lid ribs could be opened up as louvers for better air flow for the VW engine if desired.
- The MkII went through the most changes, receiving a shorter removable nose section, built-in roll cage on later models, longer side windows hinged from front bottom and top corners, and the addition of a Ford-based model. Ford versions have a bump on the bonnet to accommodate the engine and later version had smooth boot lids with the ribs removed.
- The MkIII reverted to a one piece nose, received a slightly higher roof, and both versions now had built-in steel bars to protect the cabin area. Side windows as per the MkII.

The chassis was an unshortened Volkswagen Type 1 platform with a 2,400 mm (94.5 in) wheelbase, while the car was 4,240 mm (166.9 in) long, 1,780 mm (70.1 in) wide, and a mere 1,040 mm (40.9 in) high. First mentioned in 1984, a targa-roofed 2+2-seater version called the 2 Plus was also available, with only a slight weight penalty.

=== Front-engined version ===
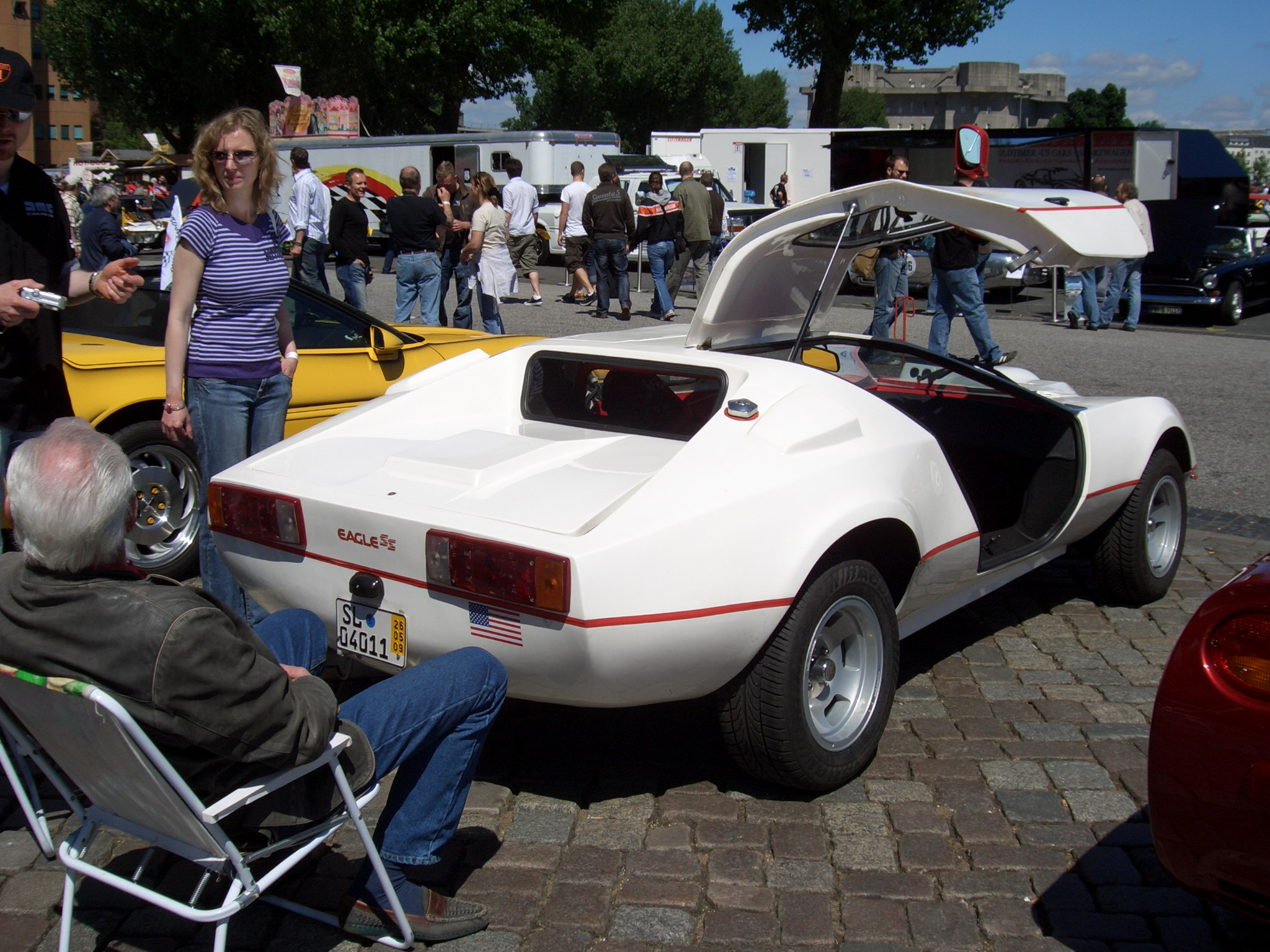
Late Eagle SS, rear view

Later, Eagle engineered a front-engined, tubular framed chassis for the SS. This used Ford Cortina running gear, and was easily recognized by its conspicuous (and odd-looking) bonnet bulge. Eagle also claimed it possible, and indeed it has been done, to fit this version of the SS with Rover's familiar 3.5-litre V8. At least one car was built on the Ford Sierra 4x4 running gear but the EOC has been informed it suffered in a roof collapse and is no longer a viable repair.

The Series 3 SS was somewhat taller, at 1,120 mm (44.1 in).

In 2005 the rights (and the dormant moulds) to the Eagle SS were rescued from a Kent boat yard by Tim Naylor of TEAC Sports Cars. Unfortunately, Tim was unable to raise sufficient interest in the revised mid-engine MkIV SS based on a Toyota MR2 donor which was exhibited at Stoneleigh in 2006, and the project has since been sold on eBay in 2010 to a buyer in Wexford.

Approximately only 340 of each version (VW and Ford) covering all three marks were made, a total of 680+ cars, of which 180 are accounted for on the E.O.C. register, and under a handful are currently on the road (DVLA January 2014).

== Other models ==
Eagle Cars' fibreglass-bodied Jeep-lookalike, the Jeep RV, was built around Ford Cortina parts. There was also an Eagle RV 4X4 (Range Rover, later also Daihatsu Fourtrak/Rocky based), unusual for kit cars in that it had four-wheel drive. The RV used an X-braced ladder frame and the expected Ford engines, although the Ford Capri's 3-litre V6 and the usual Rover V8 were also possible fitments, while the Eagle 4x4 was available with a whole host of different engines from Rover, Mercedes, Peugeot, or Ford. Later a Ford Sierra-based two-seater, two-door convertible (also available with a hardtop) called the Milan 2 Plus. This was first seen in 1988 and was co-developed with "Milan-Automobile" of Remscheid, Germany. Since it accepted all Sierra underpinnings, the Milan was available with engines ranging from 1.6 to 2.8 litres and with either rear-wheel drive or all-wheel drive. During the eighties, an RV Jeep Series II was developed, using more modern Ford Sierra parts.

Eagle also offered modified versions of the sporting 2-seater Dutton Phaeton using Ford Escort Mk I and Mk II parts, called the Eagle P21 and P25. These could accept a multitude of engines, ranging from the donor Escort's four-cylinder to a Rover V8. They were 3,530 mm (139.0 in) long, 1,574 mm (62.0 in) wide and 1,194 mm (47.0 in) tall.

Eagle's last development was the Stendetto, a Ferrari F40 lookalike sportscar based on the Pontiac Fiero.
