= Embeesea Kit Cars =

- Company type: British kit car manufacturer
- Industry: Automobiles
- Founded: 1975
- Founder: Michael B Carlton
- Headquarters: High Wycombe, Buckinghamshire, United Kingdom
- Products: Chepeko, Eurocco, Charger, Charger 2

Embeesea Kit Cars was a British kit car manufacturing company, based in High Wycombe, Buckinghamshire, operational 1975-1983.

== Background ==
Embeesea is the phonetic presentation of the initials of Michael B Carlton, who formed the business in 1975 to manufacture and market kits for the homebuilt car market. Carlton had been employed at Siva Cars, where he learned the trade of glass fibre laminating and mould-making, and where he was inspired by Neville Trickett's styling of the Siva Saluki. In 1983, Embeesea Kit Cars was incorporated into a new firm named MBC Car Company Ltd.

== Chepeko ==
The Chepeko was Carlton's first project to produce a kit car that was easy to build, and reasonably practical for everyday use. To this end, it was based on the floorpan (chassis) of a 1960s Volkswagen Beetle coupled with the available range of engines that would mate with the drivetrain. It was a two-seater, with gull-wing doors. The kit comprised a one-piece body shell, built from separate glass-fibre mouldings bonded together. Other parts included mouldings for the two doors and bonnet, plus door gas struts, hinges and catches, and four side windows in moulded acrylic sheet. The front and rear screens were not in the kit, but could be sourced as the rear screens of 1970s Vauxhall estate cars. The kit was produced from 1975 to 1976. The design changed several times throughout the production run of less than 20, including restyling of the rear end, and the provision of separate engine cover, headlight covers, instrument box, and sunroof panels. Length 166 in (4,216 mm), width 66 in (1,676 mm), height 45 in (1,143 mm), wheelbase 94.5 in (2,400 mm).

== Charger (later named Charger 1) ==
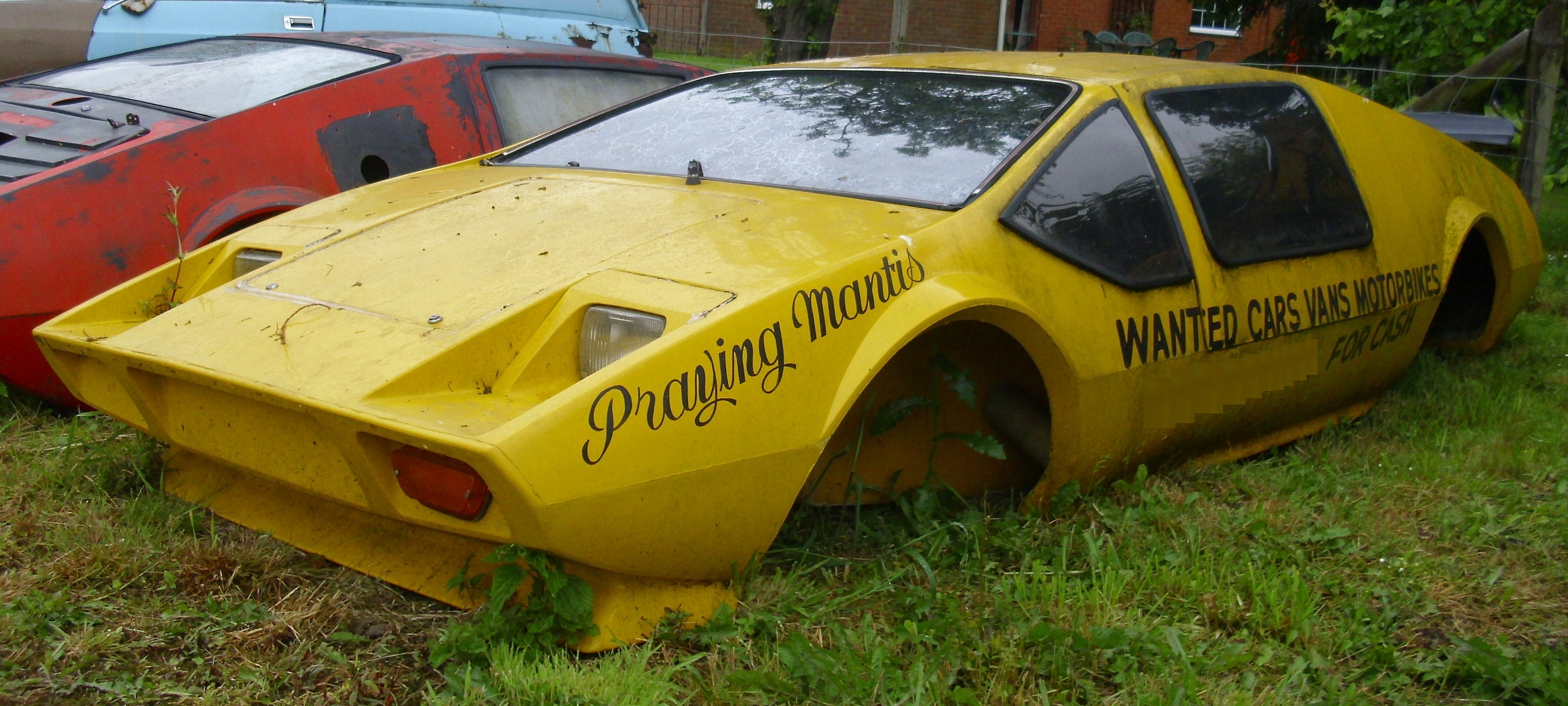
A completed Charger 1 body

In late 1976, the Chepeko was redesigned by Mike Carlton, with the bodyshell comprising a single moulding incorporating new front and rear styling, and an integrated front spoiler. Kits were first advertised in early 1977, as the Embeesea Charger, that included parts as previously supplied in the Chepeko kit. Over 150 kits were made. In 1984, the moulds were sold to DJ Sportscars, then to MDB Sportscars, and it was marketed as the Saratoga. Length 156 in (3,962 mm), width 64 in (1,626 mm), height 42 in (1,067 mm), wheelbase 94.5 in (2,400 mm).

== Eurocco (later named Comet, SN-1) ==
The first Eurocco design was an attempt by Mike Carlton to produce a kit car with 'family-friendly' features, such as conventional doors, 2+2 seating and front luggage compartment. It was based on the VW Beetle floorpan and engine, and required parts from Ford and Fiat production cars. Only about three kits were made, in 1981. Length 166 in (4,216 mm), width 66 in (1,676 mm), height 45 in (1,143 mm), wheelbase 94.5 in (2,400 mm). In 1981, the moulds were sold to Pulsar Cars, marketed as the Comet, later as the Steaney SN-1.

== Eurocco 1 (later named SR-1) ==
In about 1980, Carlton developed another 'Eurocco', that retained conventional doors but was more styled as a sports coupe. It required screens and door components from Ford and Citroen cars. About four kits were made in 1981. Length 166 in (4,216 mm), width 68 in (1,727 mm), height 46 in (1,168 mm), wheelbase 94.5 in (2,400 mm). In 1983, the moulds were sold to SR Sports Cars, and it was marketed as the SR-1.

== Eurocco 2 (later named SR-2) ==
In 1981, the Eurocco 2 was a redesign of the Eurocco 1, to incorporate side windows and door components from Ford Capri. About four kits were made in 1982. Length 166 in (4,216 mm), width 68 in (1,727 mm), height 46 in (1,168 mm), wheelbase 94.5 in (2,400 mm). In 1983, the moulds were sold to SR Sports Cars, and it was marketed as the SR-2.

== Charger 2 (later named Saturn, Dragonfly) ==
In 1982, the Charger 2 was developed, as a restyled gull-wing adaptation of the Eurocco 2. In total, 48 kits were made. Length 163 in (4,140 mm), width 68 in (1,727 mm), height 46 in (1,168 mm), wheelbase 94.5 in (2,400 mm). In 1984, the moulds were sold to DJ Sportscars, later to MDB Sportscars as the Saturn, and then offered by Viking Sports Cars as the Dragonfly.

== Bibliography ==
- Filby, Peter J. Spring 1979. Alternative Cars 79. Special Car Consultants
- Filby, Peter J. Summer 1980. Alternative Cars. Special Car Consultants
- The Complete Kit Car Guide 1983. Alternative Cars
- The Complete Kit Car Guide 1984. Alternative Cars
