= Siva Motor Car Company =

- Company type: Manufacturing Company
- Industry: Automobiles
- Founded: 1970; 56 years ago
- Headquarters: Aylesbury, England, UK
- Key people: Neville Trickett, Nick Jenke, Michael Saunders

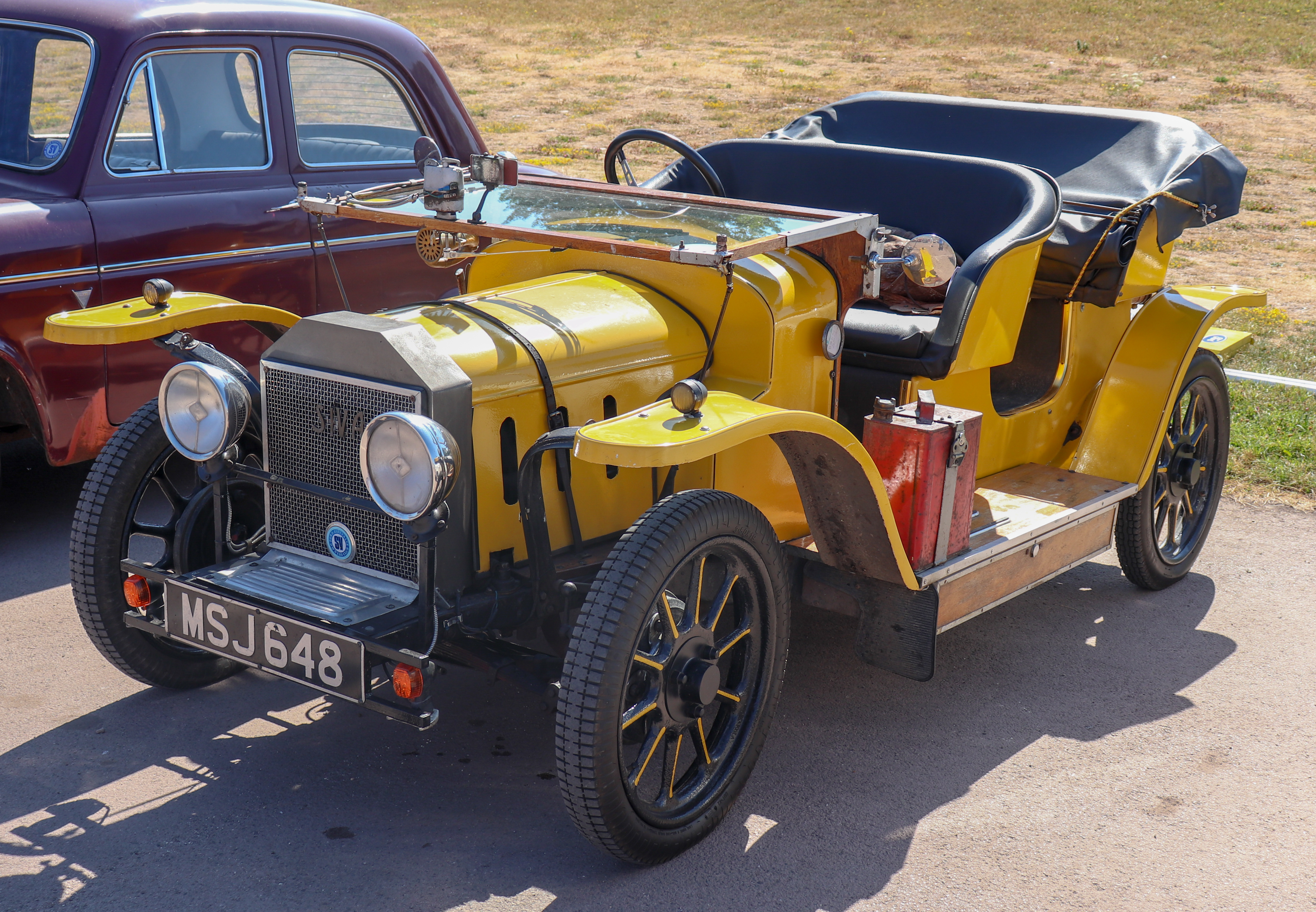
Siva Edwardian

The Siva Motor Car Company was a British manufacturer of automobiles active from 1970 to 1976.

== Company history ==
The designers Neville Trickett and Nick Jenke set up a company called Neville Tricket (Design) Ltd in April 1967 based in Blandford Forum, Dorset. At the suggestion of Michael Saunders, who ran a company called Siva Engineering in Bournemouth, the pair set out to design a series of Edwardian-looking cars, and founded the Siva Motor Car Company in 1969. A sales company, Siva Motor Car Co. Ltd was based in Aylesbury, Buckinghamshire. Production ended in 1976. In total, about 185 cars were made.

== Vehicles ==
The Edwardian series had bodies largely made of glass fibre that could be fitted to a chassis supplied by the customer. The first in 1969, pre-dating the founding of the Siva company, was the two seat Roadster and four seat Tourer on a Ford Popular chassis. For GBP125 the builder received a body, scuttle and bonnet, four wings, wheel covers and a basic instruction sheet. Extras included a windscreen, weather equipment and upholstery. Complete cars were also available at GBP355. The last cars were made in 1974 after around 80 Tourers and 25 Roadsters had been made. The first Edwardians were followed by the Raceabout and San Remo on a VW Beetle frame and Parisienne on a Citroen 2CV. 126 Edwardian kits were produced.

A more successful model was the Mini Buggy similar to VW beach buggies, but based on the Mini. The kit with chassis and body cost GBP 195. By 1976, 95 had been made. The project was sold to Euromotor in Amsterdam who continued production until 1976 when a fire destroyed their factory. The Mule was similar to the Mini Moke. A steel tube frame with Mini subframes formed the basis. Between 1970 and 1975 Siva made 12 of them.

The S160 coupé was based on a stillborn Hillman Imp-powered car exhibited at the 1969 Racing Car Show. At the 1971 show an incomplete and now Volkswagen powered S160 was displayed. The closed body has gullwing doors and rectangular pop-up headlamps and a fully trimmed bodyshell was priced at GBP895 rising later to GBP1,225. A bare bodyshell was however also available at GBP525. At least one open version was made. The similar S530 was produced for the 1971 London Motor Show and sponsored by the Daily Telegraph newspaper. It was a larger car; 8 in (203 mm) longer and 11 in (279 mm) wider and used a 3 Litre Ford V6 engine. An Aston Martin V8 engined version did not get beyond the prototype stage and was replaced in 1974 by the Siva V8 with a Chrysler 7.2 litre engine. Twelve of the coupés were made.

Following on from the coupés, the Siva Saluki was launched at the 1973 Racing Car Show. The VW base was retained, but both the front and headlights and the windscreen were changed from the S160 and in front of the doors additional windows were fitted. The kits were priced at GBP450 and included the glass fibre body tub, gullwing doors, nose and tail sections, seats and dashboard. The car is 164 in (4,166 mm) long, 63 in (1,600 mm) wide and 41 in (1,041 mm) high. Produced from 1973 and 1976 around 20 were made. The Saluki was later built by another company, Embeesea Kit Cars.

The Llama was the successor to the Mule and was based on the rear-engined Hillman Imp. It could be made as a two or four-seater, open or closed or as a van and came in a standard colour of ivory. The dimensions are: length 136 in (3,454 mm), width 57 in (1,448 mm) and height 57 in (1,448 mm). Between 1974 and 1976 around 50 were made.

Less successful was the 1976 Jeep-like Sierra based on the Ford Escort; only three were made.

== In popular culture ==
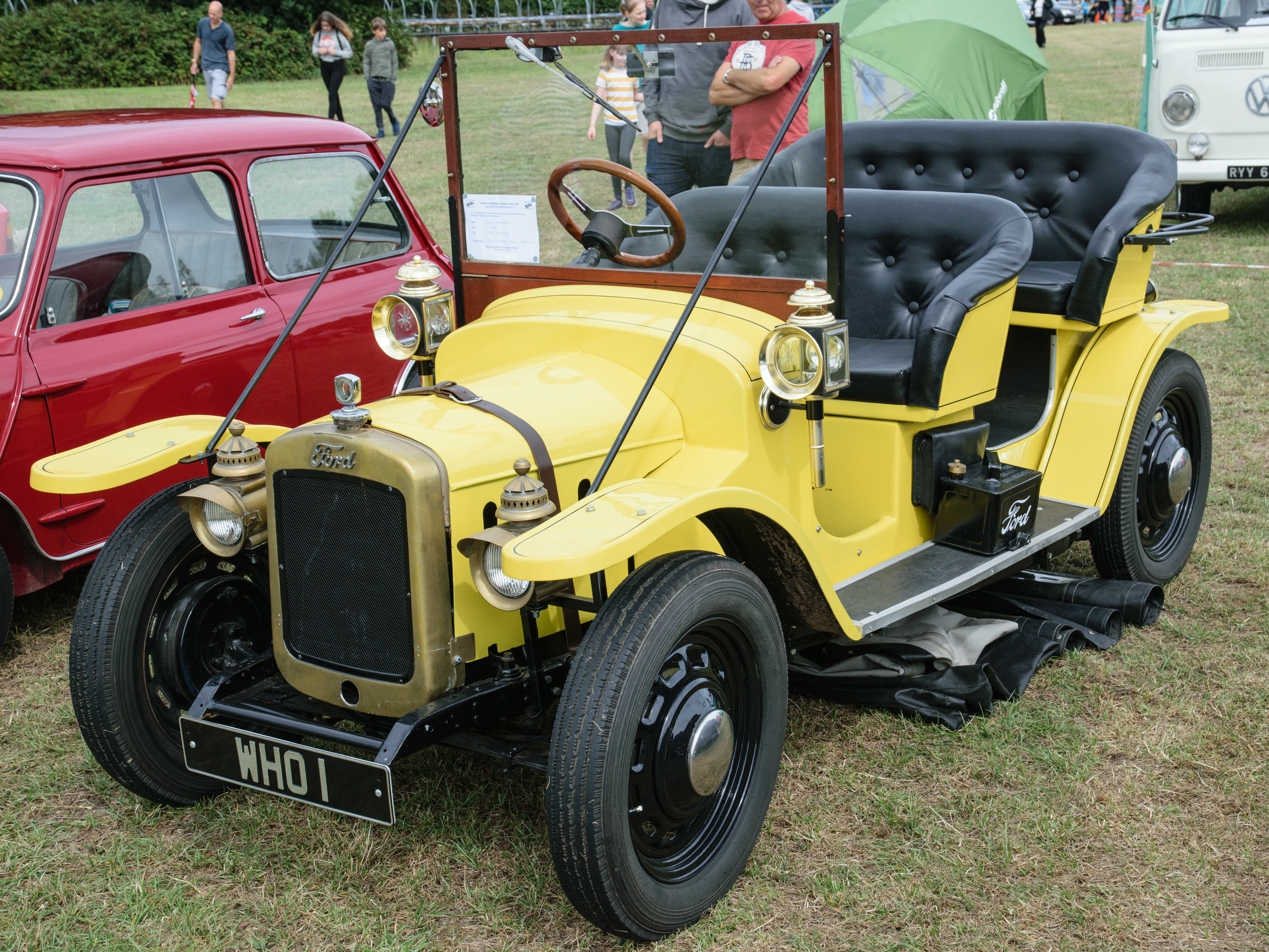
Edwardian Tourer WHO 1 (Bessie), which appeared in Doctor Who in the 1970s

An Edwardian Tourer body, constructed around a 1954 Ford Popular chassis, bearing the registration number WHO 1 and dubbed "Bessie", was used in the BBC television series Doctor Who, making her first appearance in Doctor Who and the Silurians (1970). She provided a transport solution throughout the era of the Third Doctor, but was also used by the Fourth, and by the Seventh. Since 2017, Bessie has been exhibited in the On-Screen Cars collection of the National Motor Museum, Beaulieu.
