= Mercedes-Benz M 950 =

- M 950/4 engine in C111-II

Overview
- Manufacturer: Daimler-Benz AG
- Designer: Wolf-Dieter Bensinger
- Production: 1969–1970

Layout
- Configuration: 3-rotor; 4-rotor
- Displacement: M 950 F: 3,600 cc (220 cu in); M 950/4: 4,800 cc (293 cu in)
- Compression ratio: 9.3

Combustion
- Operating principle: Wankel
- Supercharger: Naturally aspirated
- Fuel system: Mechanical petrol direct injection
- Management: Helix-controlled inline injection pump, 3D-cam
- Fuel type: Petrol
- Oil system: Wet-sump; Intake manifold oiler
- Cooling system: Water-cooler

Output
- Power output: 205 kW (280 PS); 260 kW (350 PS)

Chronology
- Predecessor: M 170
- Successor: M 951

The Mercedes-Benz M 950 is a prototype Wankel rotary engine made by Daimler-Benz. It was first described in Wolf-Dieter Bensinger's 1969 essay Der heutige Entwicklungsstand des Wankelmotors, published in January of 1970. The engine was developed by Daimler-Benz's Wankel engine department, headed by Bensinger. About 100 units were built, of which some 3- and 4-rotor units were installed in the Mercedes-Benz C 111 experimental sports car, from 1969 until 1970, as a mid-engine. Although scheduled for commercial introduction in 1970 as a two-rotor engine, the M 950 had not reached the series production stage by 1972. Daimler-Benz then developed a successor to the M 950, the M 951, but Daimler-Benz's Wankel engine development was abandoned in 1976.

== Design ==
The M 950 is a prototype engine family with a working chamber volume of 600 cc, designed for automobile use and had, by 1972, not reached the series-production stage. Designed as an engine family, the M 950 was meant to be easily expandable; Wolf-Dieter Bensinger briefly mentions designs with up to six rotors, and notes that a five-rotor design would have very favourable eccentric shaft bearing conditions. Eventually, the engine was made in three- and four-rotor versions. It has peripheral intake and exhaust porting, a mechanical petrol direct injection system, and single spark plugs.

The housing is made of aluminium, and has, at the combustion chamber, a Mahle-made Nikasil coating. The engine has, instead of rotors made of malleable cast iron, rotors made of forged aluminium, which reduces the rotor mass by about 50 per cent when compared with rotors made of cast iron. The rotors were designed by Daimler-Benz, and made by Mahle.

The eccentric shaft is a single piece and has no hirth joints. It is forged of heat-treated and specially induction-hardened CK 45 steel with a UTS of 800–900 MPa. In the three-rotor version, the eccentrics have a 120° spacing, and in the four-rotor version, a 90° spacing. In the four-rotor version, eccentric 1 and 2 as well as 3 and 4 are opposed (180°), meaning that the eccentrics for rotors 2 and 3 are only 90° apart from one another, causing significant stress on the centre bearing. However, by designing the eccentric shaft with a bigger diameter, this problem was resolved.

The standard oil pump for the wet-sump pressure lubrication system needs to provide only half the volumetric flow rate of a comparable piston engine's oil pump. However, the oil cooler needs a higher cooling power than a comparable piston engine's cooler.

For rotor lubrication, the engine is fitted with a small nutating-disc oil-metering pump that provides 0.6 mm^{3} (0.0006 ml) of oil per rotor and engine output shaft rotation. It is driven by the eccentric shaft, and has a reduction in the range of 1:45 until 1:60. The pump's main variation of volumetric flow rate is controlled by the gas pedal linkage, but the pump also allows the aforementioned range in reduction, as well as a reduction in pumping stroke to adapt to several engine conditions. It is tuned to provide an oil film on the housing with a thickness of 30 nm. Due to the engine's petrol direct injection, the oil cannot be injected through the fuel injector, because that would result in mixture formation and eventually combustion. Therefore, the oil is introduced into the throttle valve bushing near the intake port, from where it enters into the engine's chambers.

== Technical specifications ==
Technical specifications
	3-rotor engine (M 950 F)	4-rotor engine (M 950/4)
Eccentricity $e$	15 mm	
Generating radius $R$	99 mm	
Equidistant $a$	4 mm	
Width $B$	75 mm	
Chamber volume $V_k$	600 cc	
Displacement $V_h$	3600 cc	4800 cc
Compression $\varepsilon$	9.3	
Rated power $P_e$	205 kW (280 PS)	260 kW (350 PS)
Rated speed $n_e$	7,000 rpm	6,000 rpm
BMEP $p_e$	10.5 bar (1.05 MPa)	11.0 bar (1.10 MPa)
Mass $m$	150 kg	180 kg
Source		

Power diagram of the M 950/4
Power (kW) by Eccentric shaft speed (rpm). View chart definition.
