= Volvo YCC =

Female-designed Your Concept Car (2004)

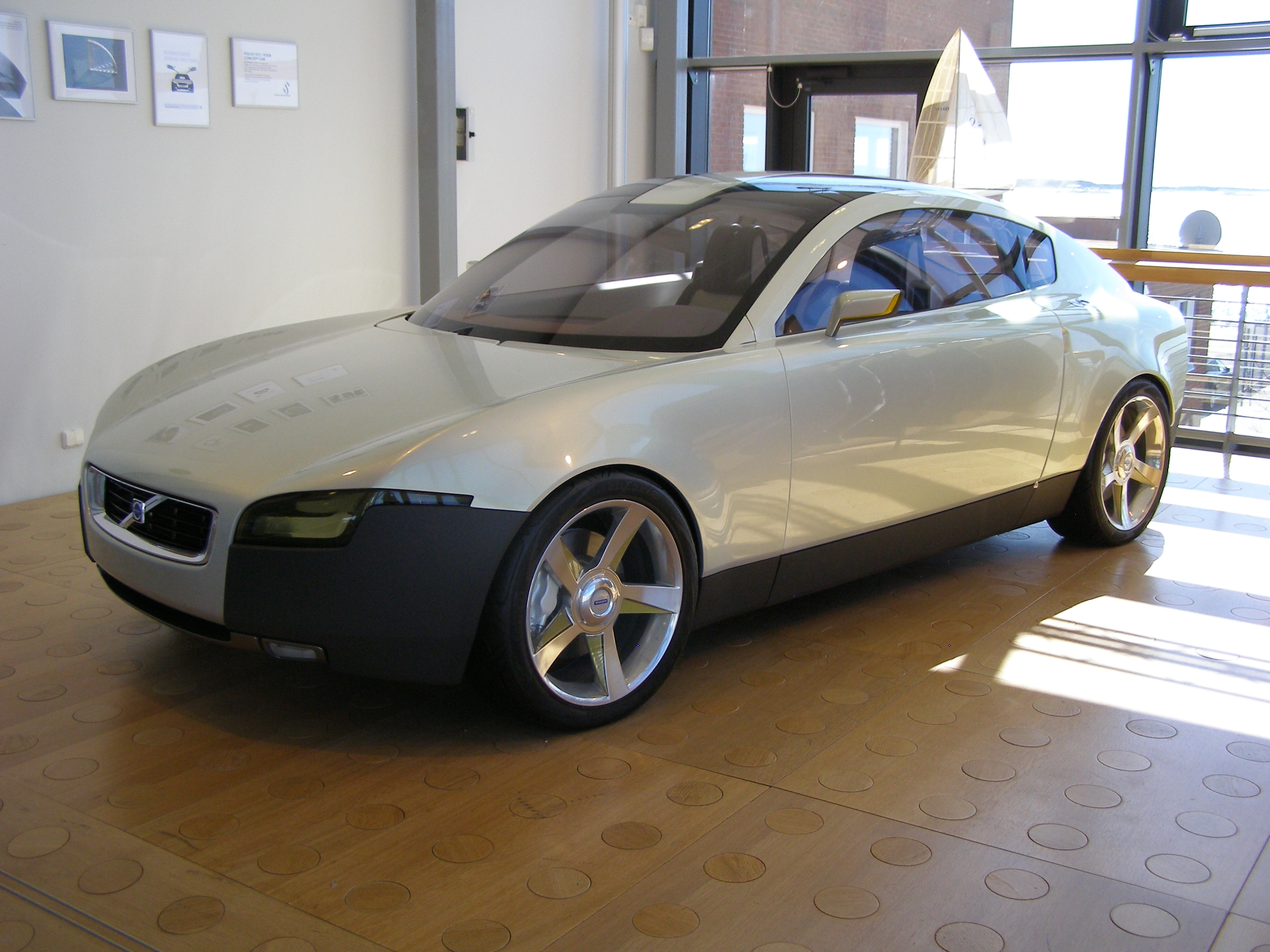

Overview
- Manufacturer: Volvo Cars
- Also called: Volvo Your Concept Car
- Production: 2004 (concept car)
- Designer: Anna Rosén

Body and chassis
- Class: Concept car
- Body style: 3-door coupe
- Layout: FR layout
- Doors: Gull-wing
- Related: Volvo SCC

Powertrain
- Engine: 2.5 L R5
- Transmission: 6-speed Powershift

The Volvo YCC ("Your Concept Car") is a concept car made by Volvo Cars presented at the 2004 Geneva Motor Show, with the stated goal of meeting the particular needs of female drivers. In order to do so, Volvo assembled a design team entirely made up of women, around October 2001. It was an exercise in ergonomics from the perspective of a female driver. Those who were involved during the several stages of the project were: Maria Widell Christiansen, Eva-Lisa Andersson, Elna Holmberg, Maria Uggla, Camilla Palmertz, Cynthia Charwick, Anna Rosén, Lena Ekelund, and Tatiana Butovitsch Temm.

The concept is a three-door, four-seat coupe design, with two gull-wing doors for entry into the car. It also has an upwards-opening hatchback door giving access to the trunk and cargo area. All three doors are motorized for a sensor-based “keyless” entry. Pressing on a single button on the keychain automatically opens the nearest door, making it easy for somebody holding bags of groceries or other sundries to get the things in the car without putting anything down.

The interior was designed for easy storage and good looks. All of the textile panels or textile parts such as the seat pads or the door sides can be removed easily to change the color schemes and vary textures. The headrests have indentations to accommodate ponytails. The shifting column and the hand brake were removed from the center console to give the front-seat passengers easier access to the large storage compartments located within the dashboard. The rear seat can fold up, making it easy for the driver to get a fairly big item in the car without opening the hatchback.

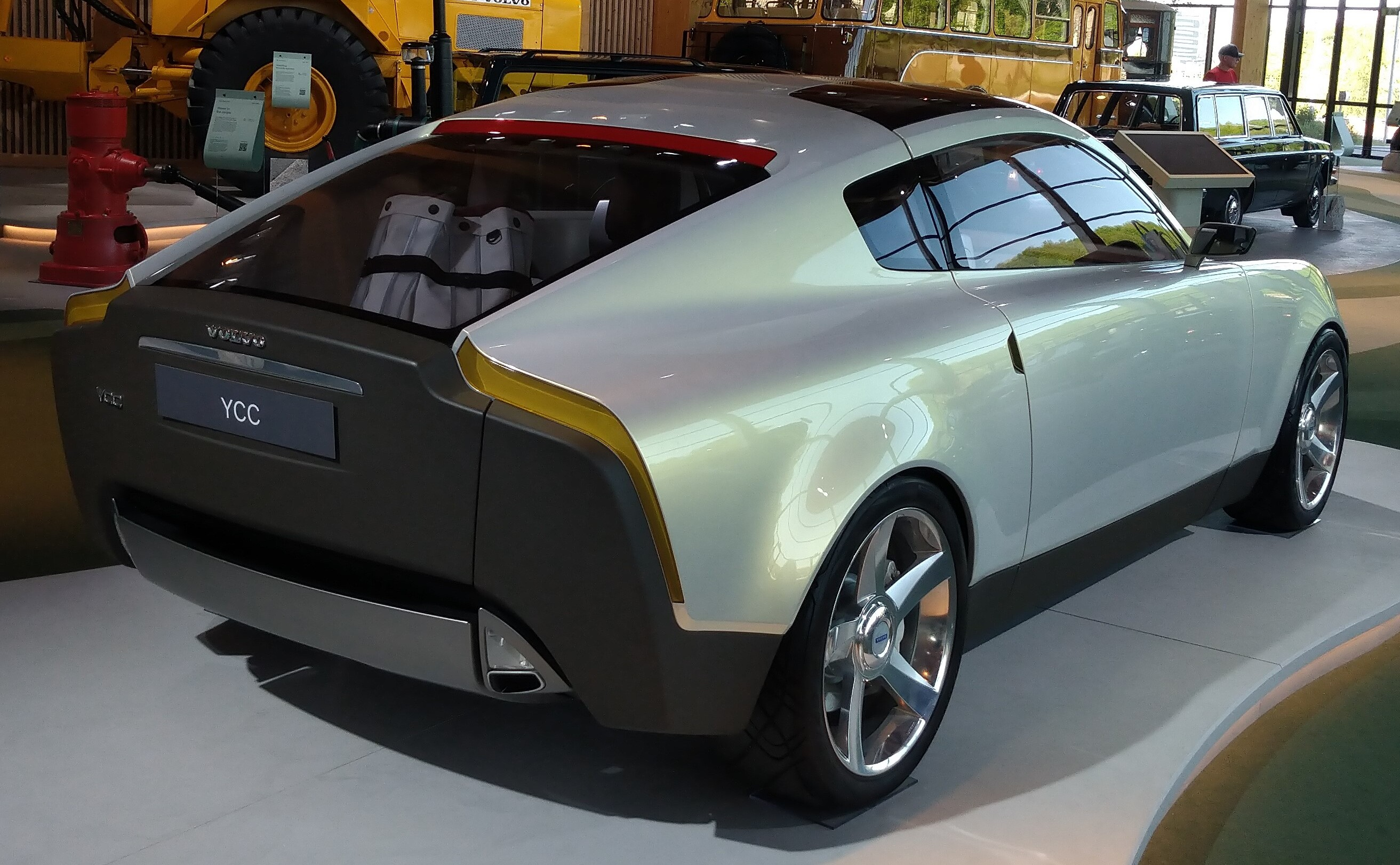
Rear view

The bumpers and body cladding were made from tough, dent-resistant materials. The low-emission 215 bhp (160 kW; 218 PS) five-cylinder PZEV engine features an Integrated Starter-Generator (ISG), "[complying] with the toughest emission standards in certain American 'green' states such as California." The car featured run-flat tires in order to be able to drive all the way to a garage after a puncture and thus avoid having to change a tire by the side of the road.

Unlike most cars, the YCC features no hood or openable access panel permitting access to the car's engine. Engine maintenance requires taking out the whole front end of the car body, preferably in some establishment with the required space and equipment. This was not supposed to happen often, as the engine was designed to need an oil change only after 50,000 km (31,000 mi) and to automatically send a radio message to a garage a short time before any required maintenance.

Filling the windshield washer tank is done by a capless ball valve, right next to the capless gas tank ball valve. Volvo surveys had found (among many other things) that female drivers considered caps to be a major nuisance.
