= Mercedes-Benz SLK-Class =

Compact executive roadster

Mercedes-Benz SLK-Class Mercedes-Benz SLC-Class
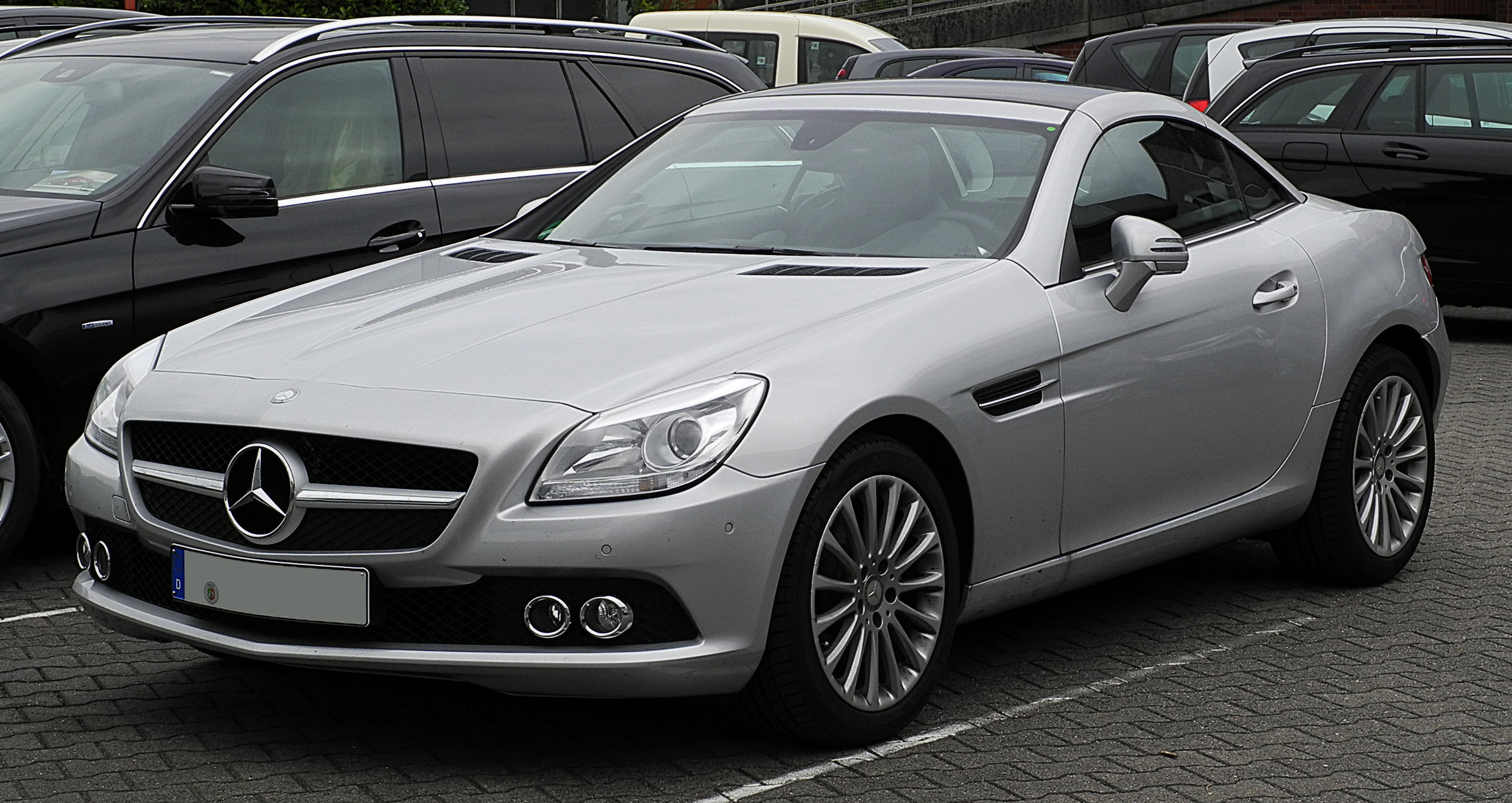

Overview
- Manufacturer: Daimler-Benz (1995–1998); DaimlerChrysler (1998–2007); Daimler AG (2007–2020)
- Production: 1996–2020

Body and chassis
- Class: Sports car (S); Grand tourer (AMG models)
- Body style: 2-door roadster
- Layout: Front-engine, rear-wheel-drive

The Mercedes-Benz SLK-Class is a compact executive roadster, produced by Mercedes-Benz. It was released in 1996 and was manufactured at the Mercedes plant in Bremen, Germany, until 2020.

The former name "SLK" was derived from sportlich (sporty), leicht (lightweight), and kurz (short). With the release of the facelift R172 in 2016, the SLK-Class was renamed to SLC-Class in accordance with the revised nomenclature adopted by Mercedes. Under this scheme, roadsters use the base name "SL", followed by the model's placement in Mercedes-Benz hierarchy, the letter "C", being the roadster equivalent to the C-Class.

== First generation (R170; 1995–2004) ==
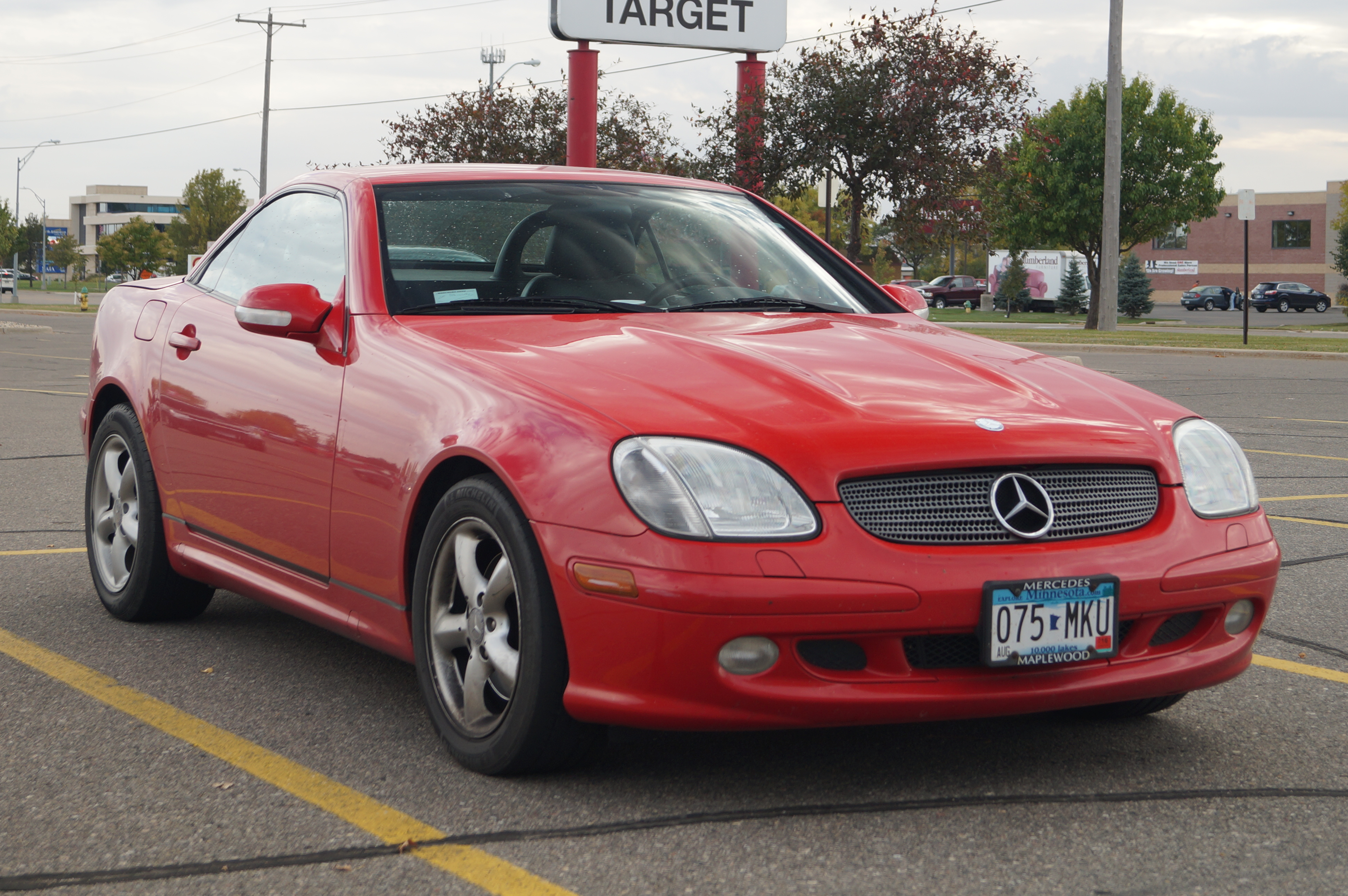
R170 SLK-Class

The R170 Mercedes SLK was the first generation compact roadster manufactured and marketed by Mercedes, from 1995 to 2004. It was designed from late 1991 under Bruno Sacco, with a final design being completed in early 1993 and approved by the board, with a German design patent filed on September 30, 1993. The production SLK-Class was introduced at the Turin Motor Show on 22 April 1996, appearing as a modern incarnation of the 1950s Mercedes-Benz 190SL, by returning to four cylinders and with an identical 94-inch (2,400 mm) wheelbase. A facelift was introduced to all models in 2000, featuring an updated design and updated engines.

== Second generation (R171; 2004–2010) ==
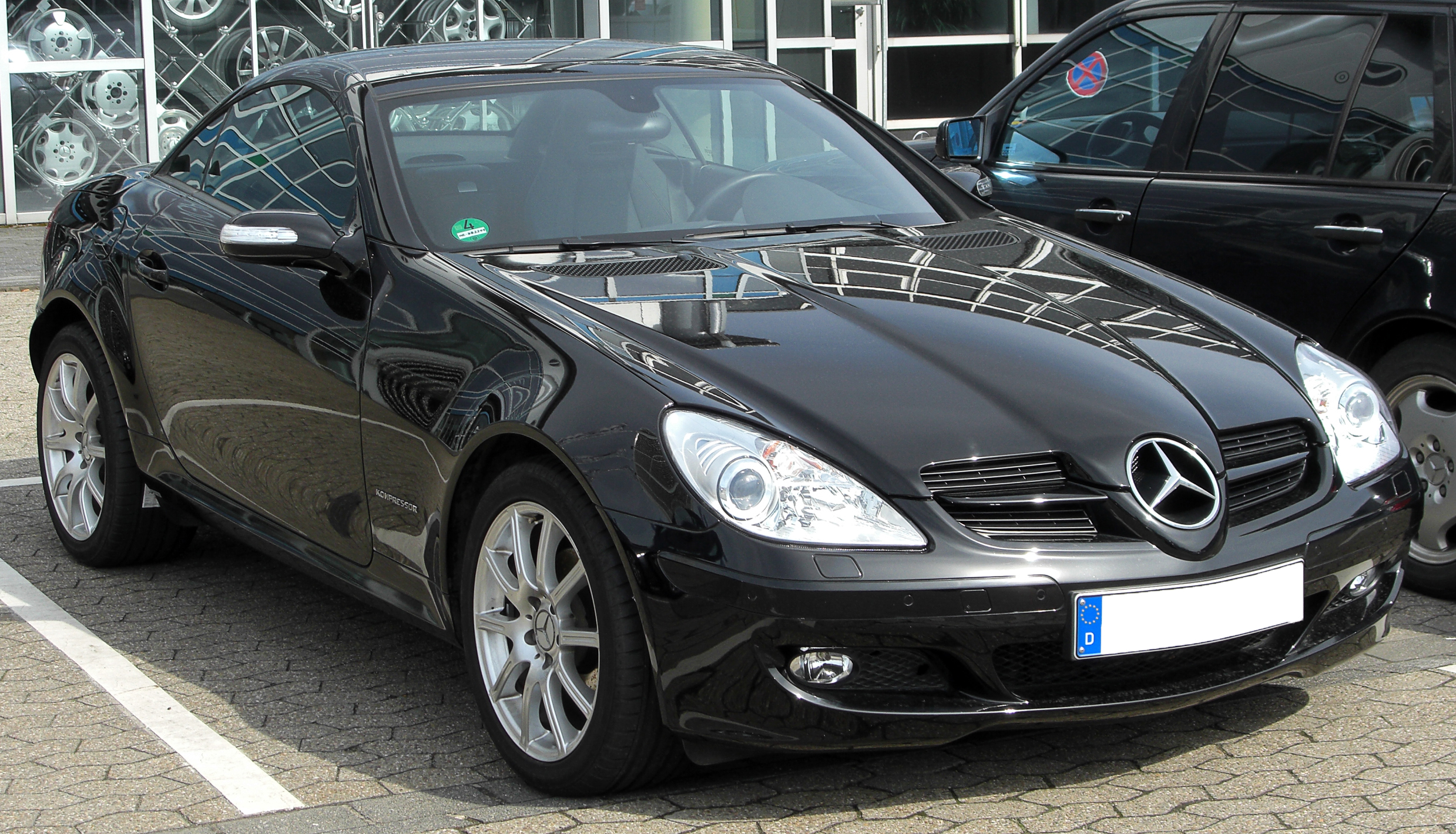
R171 SLK-Class

The R171 SLK was unveiled at the 2004 Geneva Motor Show. It features increased use of high-strength steel, and improvements to the car's torsional strength and aerodynamic efficiency. Models feature a more compact, revised roof mechanism that is operated in 22 seconds (previously 25 seconds), resulting in an increase in boot capacity by 63 liters (2.2 cu ft). The R171 also introduced the Airscarf system that integrates neck-level heating system into the headrests of the car. The front-end design of the car was inspired by the noses found in Formula One cars. It was facelifted in 2008 and featured new engines and minor exterior design changes.

== Third generation (R172; 2011–2020) ==
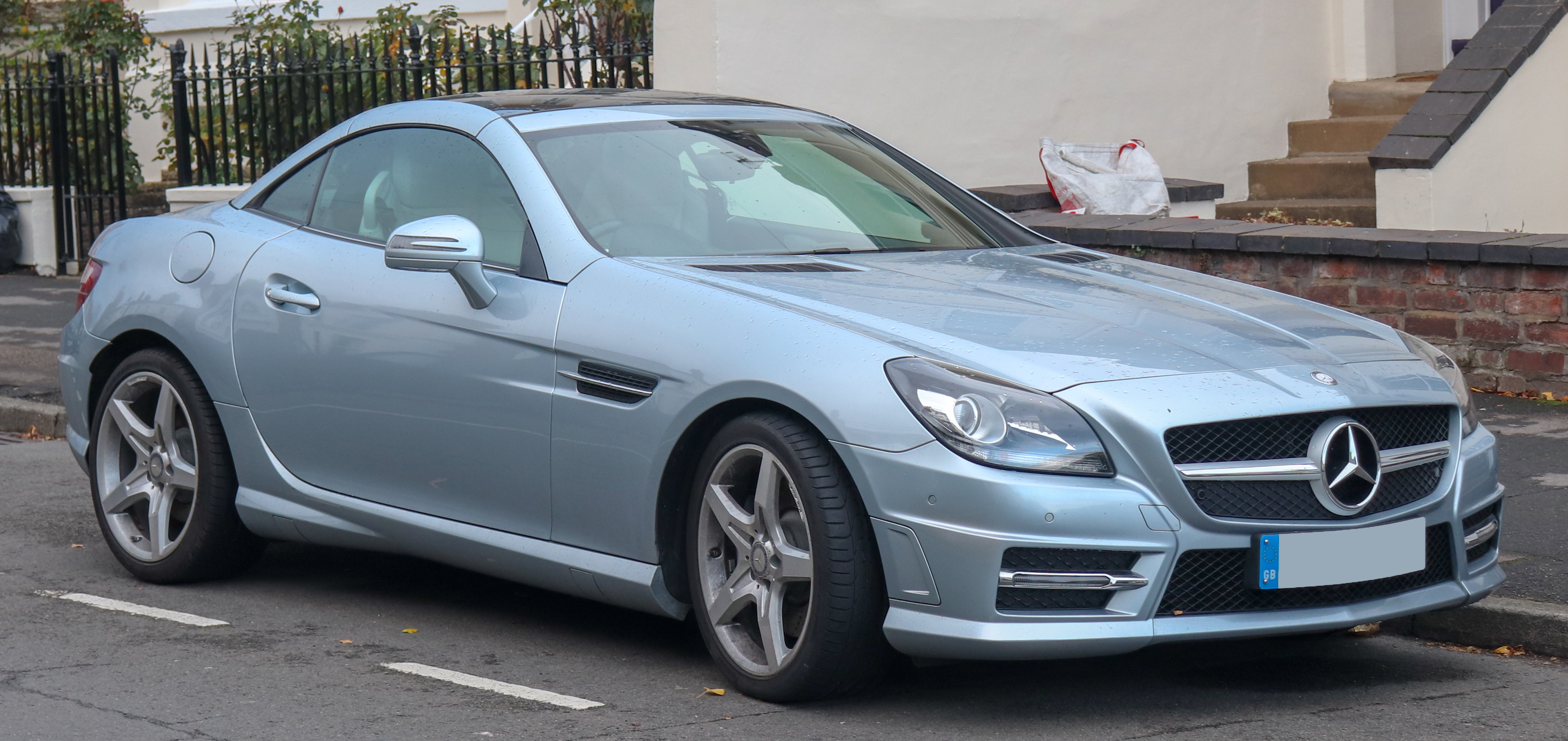
R172 SLK-Class

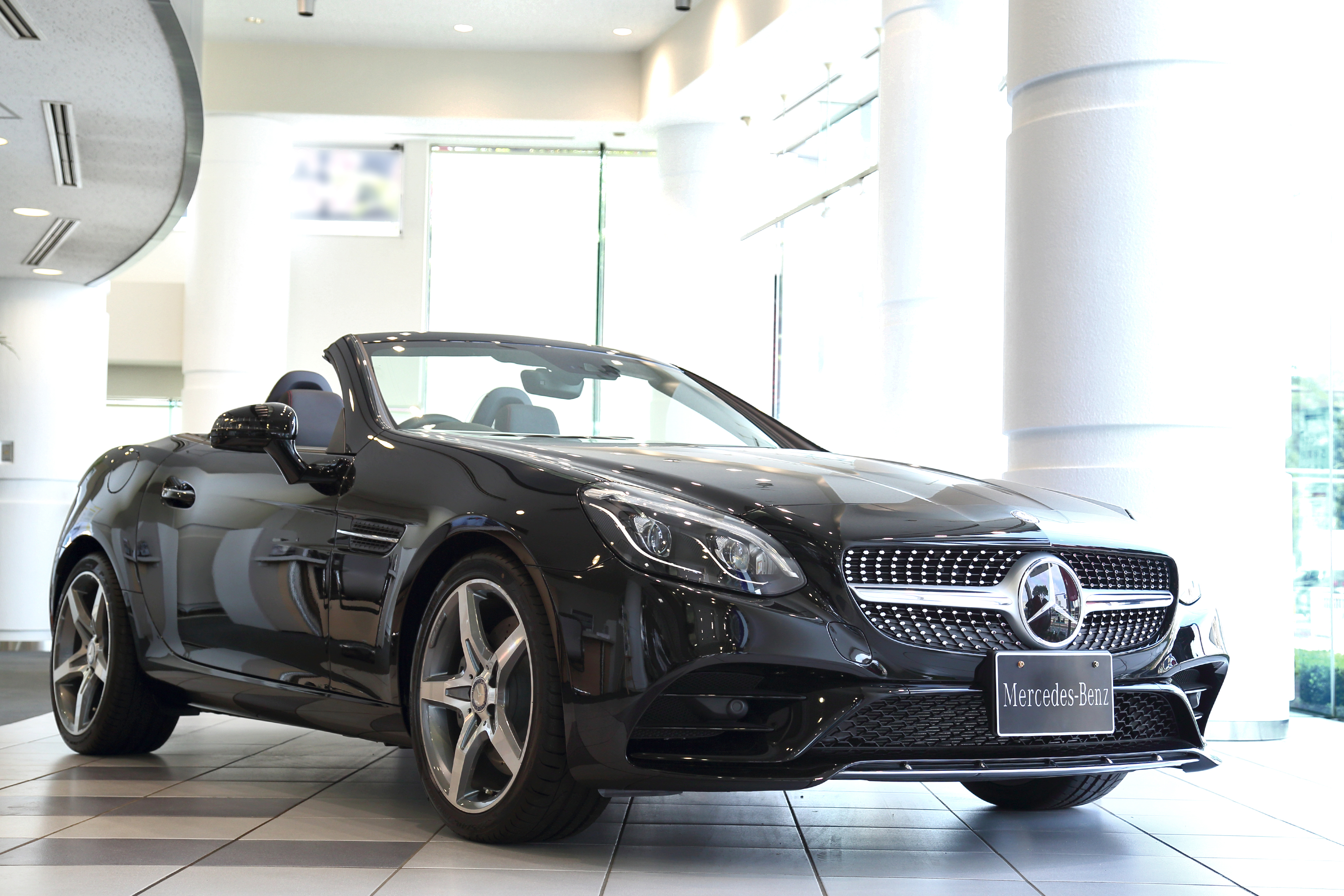
Mercedes-Benz SLC-Class Front (left)

The R172 SLK was released in 2011. It was available with a range of inline-four, V6, and V8, diesel and petrol engines, and introduced an electronically operated window tint shade for the sunroof, called Magic Sky Control. A facelift was released for vehicles produced from March 2016, to coincide with the 20th anniversary of the SLK-Class. The model range was also renamed to SLC-Class to conform to the new Mercedes nomenclature, and introduced new engines and a revised design. In 2020, Mercedes-Benz released a Final Edition to commemorate the end of the car's production run.

== Sales figures ==
The following are the sales figures for the SLK-Class since 2001:

Year	EU sales	US sales
2001	27,734	11,268
2002	19,039	7,784
2003	14,629	6,023
2004	38,417	7,360
2005	36,823	11,278
2006	27,128	10,410
2007	20,834	7,270
2008	18,529	4,941
2009	10,805	2,566
2010	8,779	1,980
2011	17,729	3,220
2012	17,731	4,595
2013	12,594	4,757
2014	11,114	4,737
2015	10,369	4,182
2016	8,909	3,397
2017	8,421	2,860
2018		1,993
2019		1,840
