= Mercedes-Benz C111 =

Mercedes-Benz C111/II
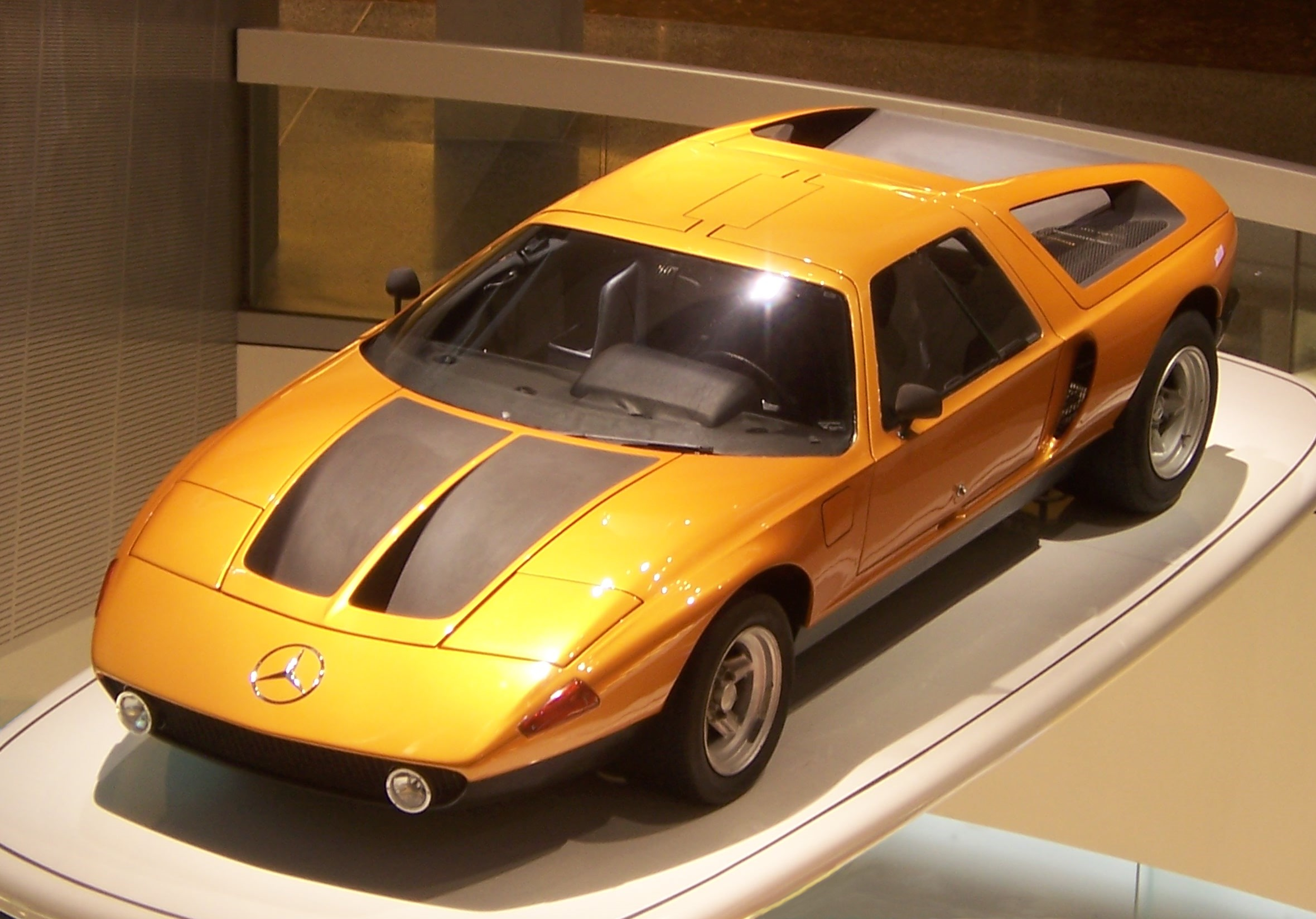
- Mercedes-Benz C111/II at the Mercedes-Benz Museum

Overview
- Manufacturer: Daimler-Benz
- Production: 1970–1979 (17 cars produced)
- Assembly: West Germany: Untertürkheim
- Designer: Bruno Sacco

Body and chassis
- Class: Sports car
- Body style: 2-door berlinetta
- Layout: Longitudinal, Rear mid-engine, rear-wheel drive
- Doors: Gullwing doors

Powertrain
- Engine: C111 I: 3600 cc M 950 F 3-rotor Wankel; C111 II: 4800 cc M 950/4 4-rotor Wankel; C111 II-D and III: 3005 cc OM 617 turbo-diesel I5); C111 IV: 4520 cc M 117 twin-turbo V8)
- Transmission: 5-speed manual

Dimensions
- Wheelbase: 2,620 mm (103.1 in)
- Length: 4,440 mm (174.8 in)
- Width: 1,800 mm (70.9 in)
- Height: 1,120 mm (44.1 in)

Chronology
- Predecessor: Mercedes-Benz SL-X
- Successor: Mercedes-Benz CW311; Mercedes-Benz C112

The Mercedes-Benz C111 was a series of experimental automobiles produced by Daimler-Benz in the 1960s and 1970s. The company was experimenting with new engine technologies, including Wankel engines, diesel engines, and turbochargers, and used the basic C111 platform as a testbed. Other experimental features included multi-link rear suspension, gull-wing doors and a luxurious interior with leather trim and air conditioning. The model inspired later Mercedes-Benz Vision One-Eleven from 2023.

== History ==
The first version of the C111 was completed in 1969, and presented at the 1969 IAA in Frankfurt. The car used a fiberglass body shell and with a mid-mounted three-rotor direct fuel injected Wankel engine (code named M950F). The next C111 appeared in 1970; it was shown at the 1970 Geneva International Motor Show. It used a four-rotor engine producing 260 kW (350 PS; 350 bhp). The car reportedly could reach a speed of 300 km/h (186 mph).

The company decided not to adopt the Wankel engine and turned to diesel experiments for the second and third C111s. The C111-IID's engine was a Mercedes-Benz OM 617, and produced 140 kW (190 PS; 187 bhp) at 4200 rpm. It was based on the Mercedes-Benz 85 kW (115 PS; 113 bhp) variant of the OM 617 used in the Mercedes-Benz W 116 S-Class, but had a different turbocharger without a wastegate, which allowed an increased pressure ratio of 3.3. Daimler-Benz also added an intercooler that significantly improved the engine's thermal efficiency.

The C111 III prototype that was completed in 1978, had a more aerodynamic bodywork that gave it an air drag coefficient of 0.195. It had a modified 3-litre version of the Mercedes-Benz OM 617 five-cylinder Diesel engine; its power output was 169 kW (230 PS; 227 bhp), and its torque output was 401 N⋅m (296 lb⋅ft) at 3600 rpm. It enabled the C111 III to reach a top speed of 338 km/h (210 mph) at the 12.5 kilometres (7.8 mi) long Nardò Ring in 1978, and also to average a 16 l/100 km fuel consumption at an average speed of 325 km/h (202 mph). The engine was fitted with an M-type inline injection pump of Bosch's PE series with a maximum injection pressure of 40 MPa.

The C111 IV had a 4.5 L twin KKK-turbocharged V8 engine that produced 368 kW (500 PS; 493 bhp) at 6000/min. This set another record at the Nardò Ring in 1979, with an average speed of 403.78 km/h (250.90 mph), driven by Hans Liebold.

Total production was 17 cars: one test chassis with a temporary body, 13 first and second generation Wankel-engined cars, two diesel-engined, third generation cars used in the Nardò record attempt, and a single, V8-engined fourth generation car.

=== Afterwards ===
A total of 17 C111s were built, of which 13 were retained. All were kept by Mercedes-Benz until 2026, when the company announced that one C111-II (chassis 33) would go up for auction in April 2027 to help fund a museum project. The company has also announced a moratorium on selling any further C111s for 25 years, helping to boost the value of this example. Mercedes-Benz introduced the C112 at the Frankfurt Motor Show in 1991 as a proposed production sports car. The car used a mid-mounted 6.0 L V12 engine. After accepting 700 deposits, the company decided not to proceed with production.

== Gallery ==
C111-I

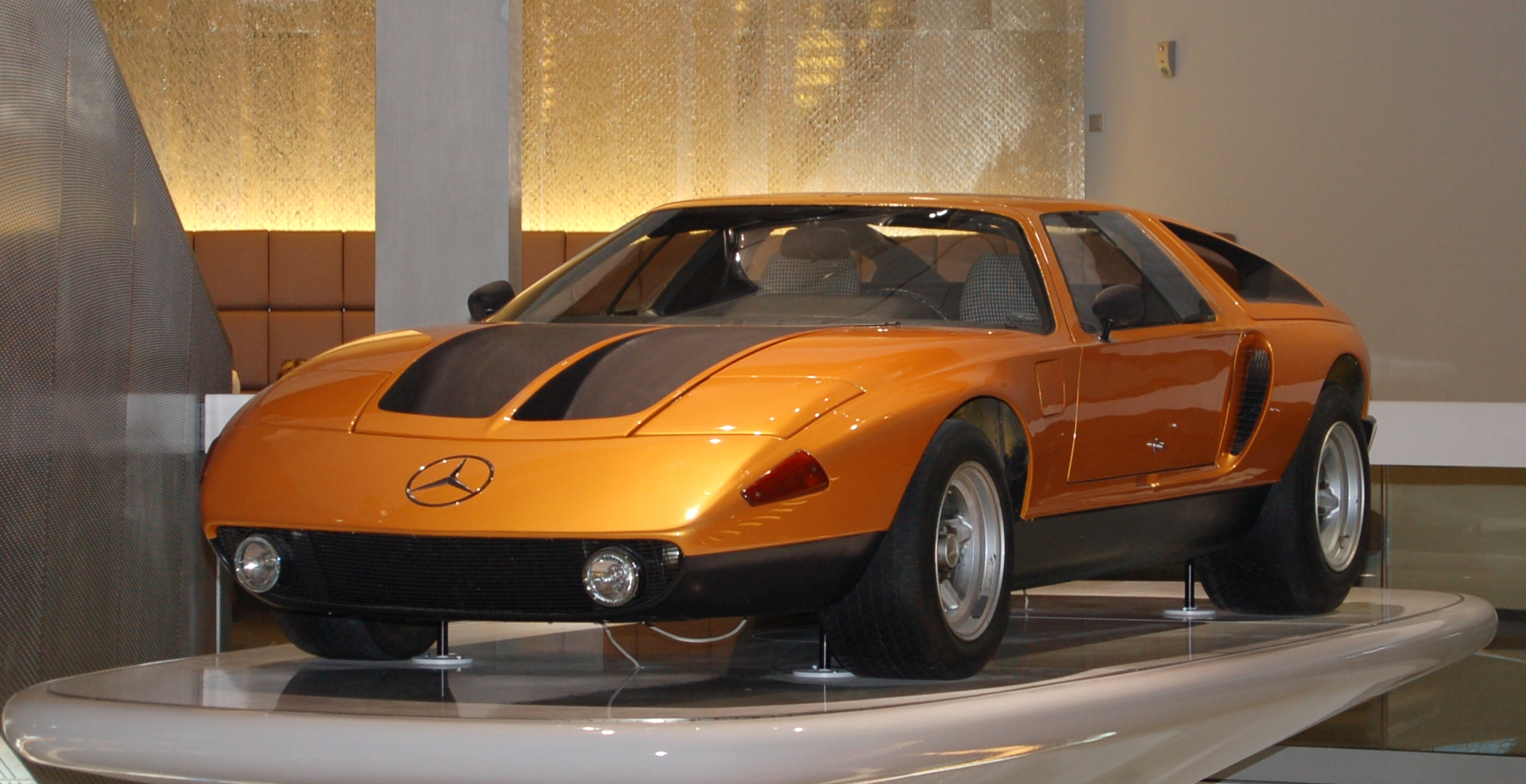
C 111-II

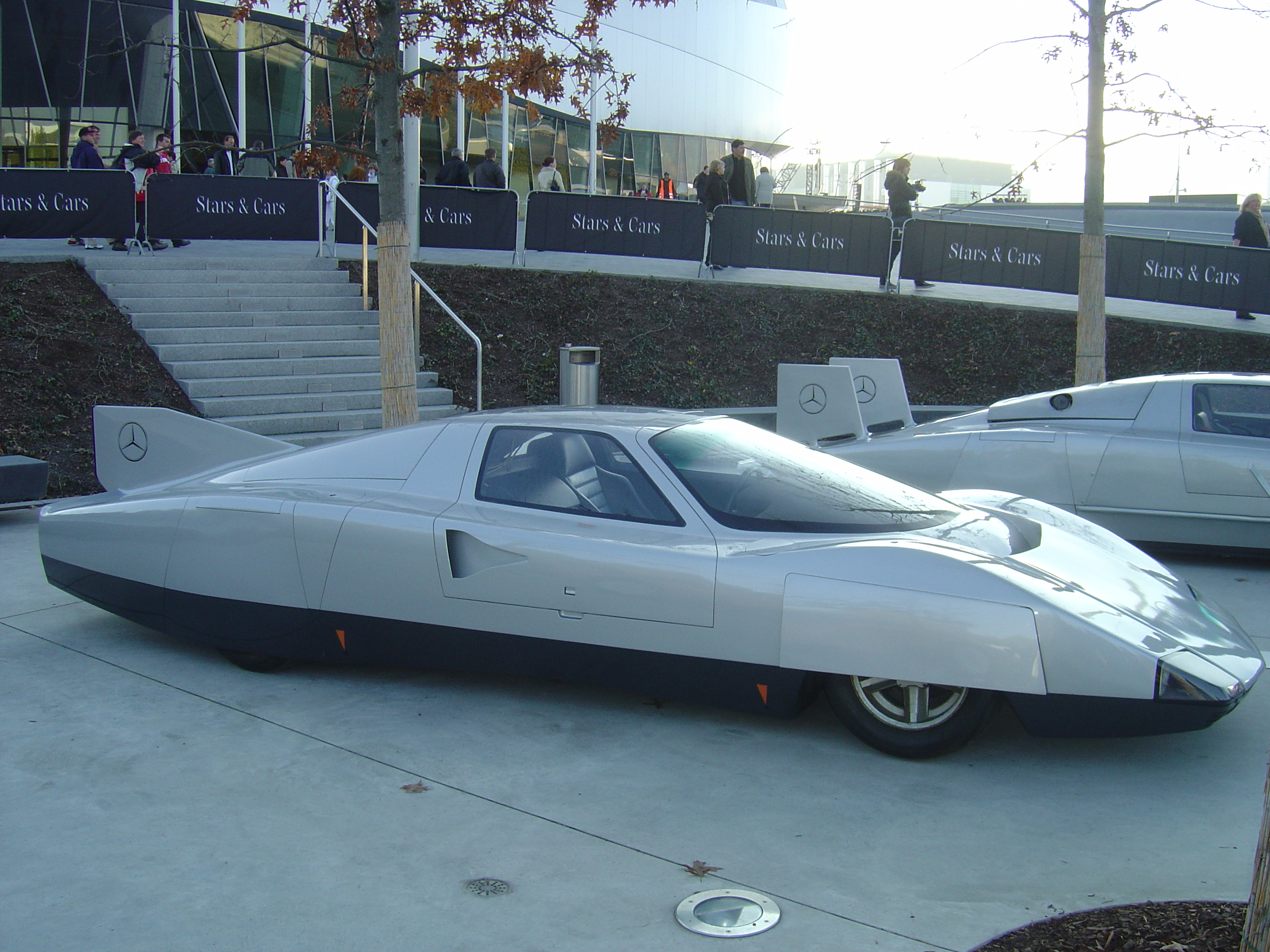
C 111-III

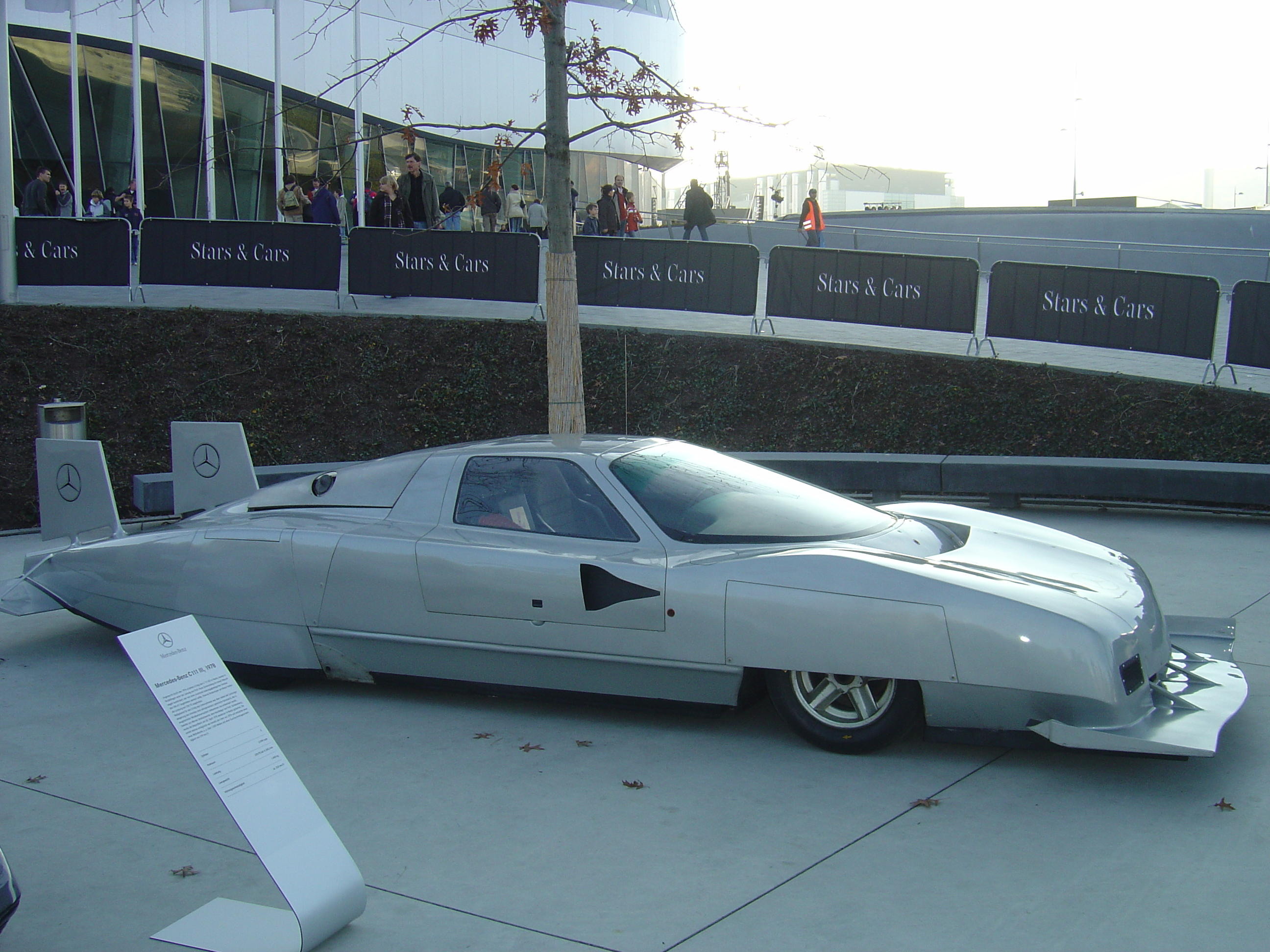
C 111-IV

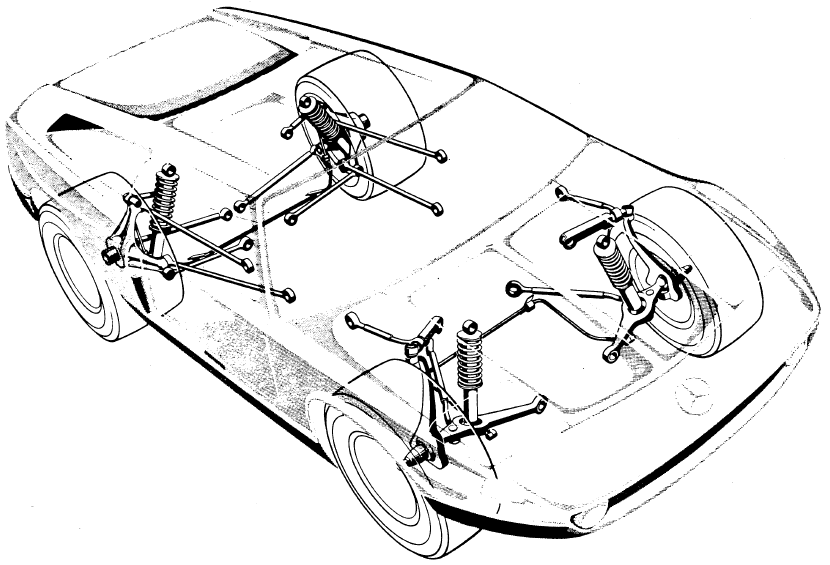
Suspension layout of the Mercedes-Benz C111 with independent multi-link on the rear axle
