= Hofstetter Turbo =

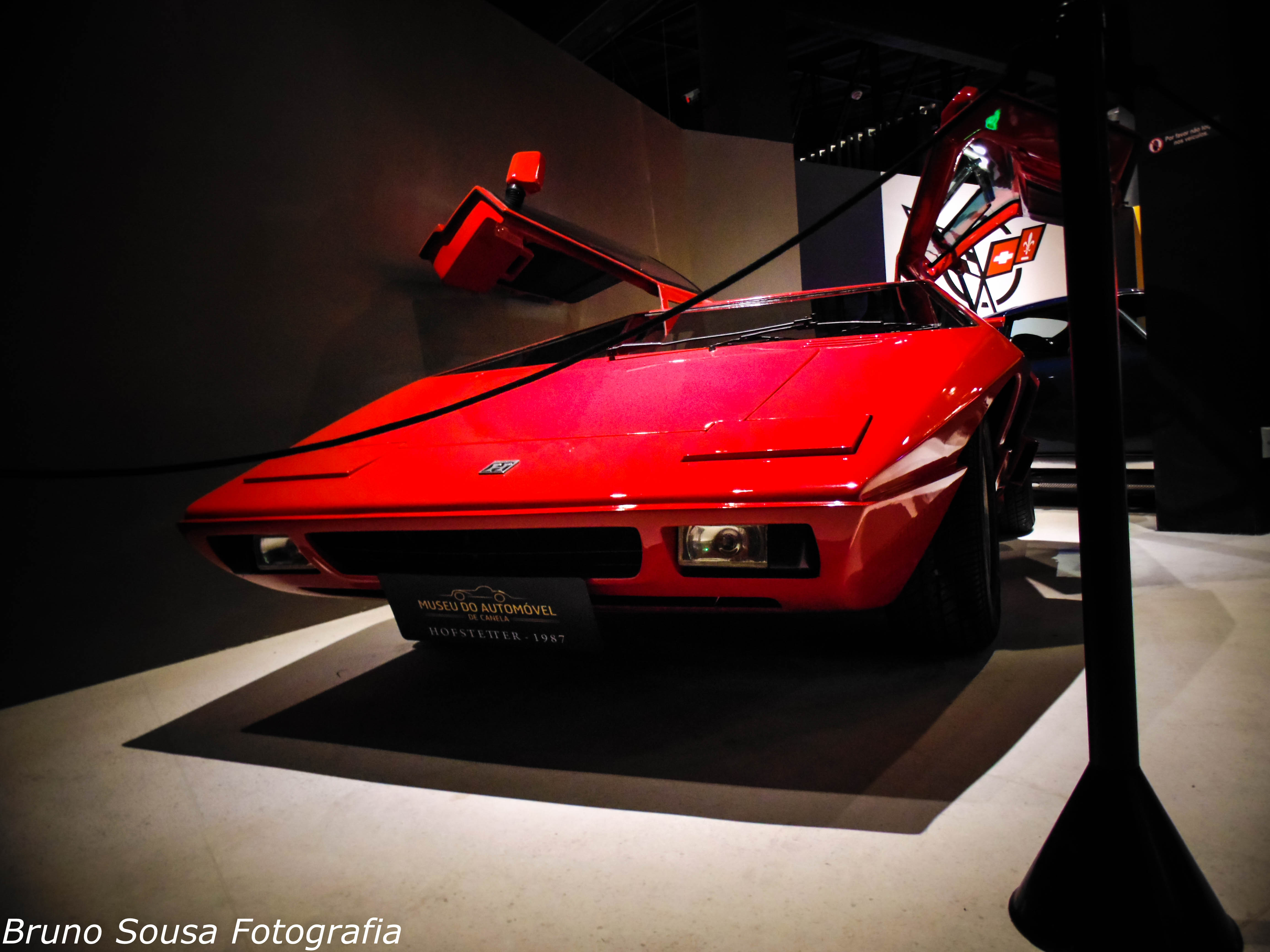
- 1987 Hofstetter Turbo in the Museu do Automóvel de Canela in Brazil

Overview
- Manufacturer: Hofstetter
- Also called: Hofstetter Cortada
- Production: 1984
- Model years: 1986-1991 (18 produced)
- Designer: Mario R Hofstetter

Body and chassis
- Layout: Rear mid-engine, rear-wheel-drive layout
- Doors: Gull-wing

Powertrain
- Engine: 1.8 L turbocharged I4; 2.0 L turbocharged I4
- Transmission: 4-speed manual

Dimensions
- Wheelbase: 2,380 mm (94 in)
- Length: 4,170 mm (164 in)
- Width: 1,740 mm (69 in)
- Height: 1,070 mm (42 in)
- Curb weight: 1,120 kg (2,470 lb)

The Hofstetter Turbo is a Brazilian sports car created in the 1980s by Mario Richard Hofstetter. In 1980, Hofstetter started to draw a prototype of the car. The idea was to produce a domestically built sports car, since the Brazilian government had strict policies on importing foreign cars at the time. In 1982, he started to put the mid-engined car together with some other workers, and began the Hofstetter company in 1984. Hofstetter was only able to sell 18 cars between 1986–1991.

== Performance ==
The Turbo featured a fiberglass body with gull-wing doors that were reportedly inspired by the Alfa Romeo Carabo concept car. The interior was upholstered in leather and featured an early digital dash. Early models of the Turbo were powered by a 1.8 L Inline-four engine from the Volkswagen Passat, which was then equipped with a Garrett turbocharger and coupled to a 4-speed manual gearbox. These engines reportedly produced 140 hp (104 kW) at 5,000 rpm, allowing the car to accelerate from 0–60 mph (0–97 km/h) in 9.3 seconds and reach a top speed of 120 mph (193 km/h). Later models used a 2.0 L inline-four engine out of a Volkswagen Santana that was also turbocharged with a Garrett turbo. This engine reportedly produced 210 hp (160 kW) and increased the top speed to 147 mph (237 km/h).
