= Gull-wing door =

Car door hinged at the roof

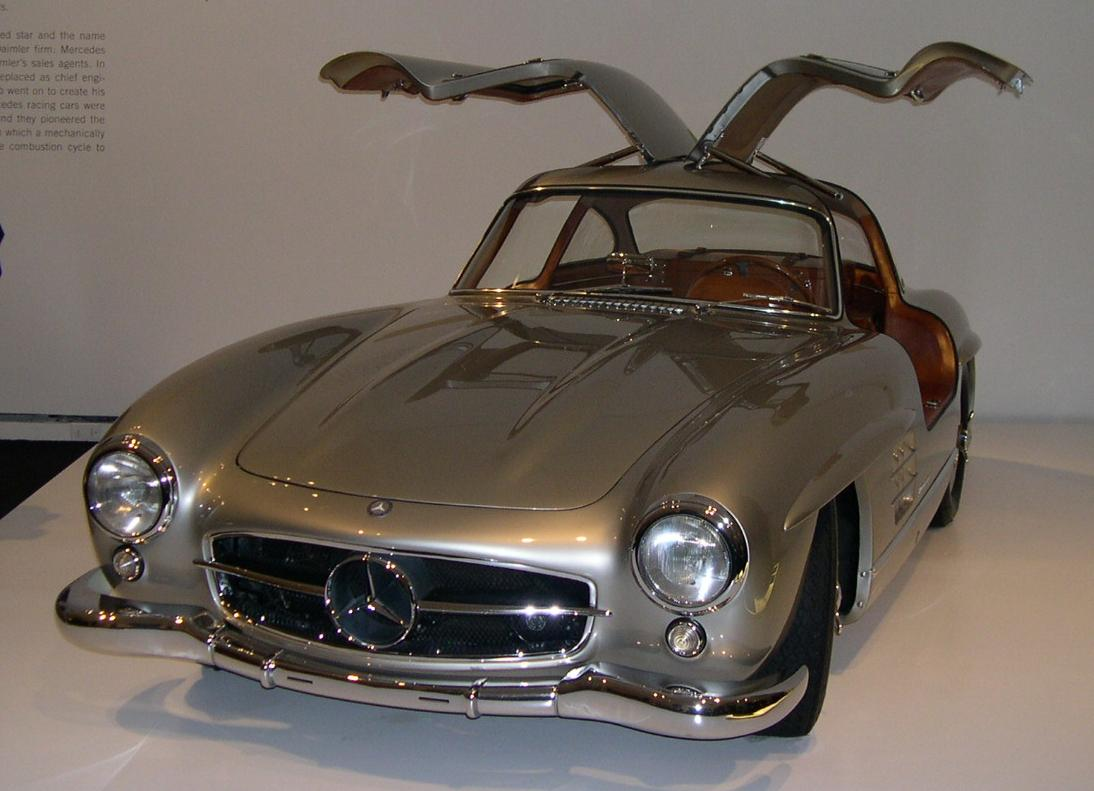
Mercedes-Benz 300 SL coupé with its doors open

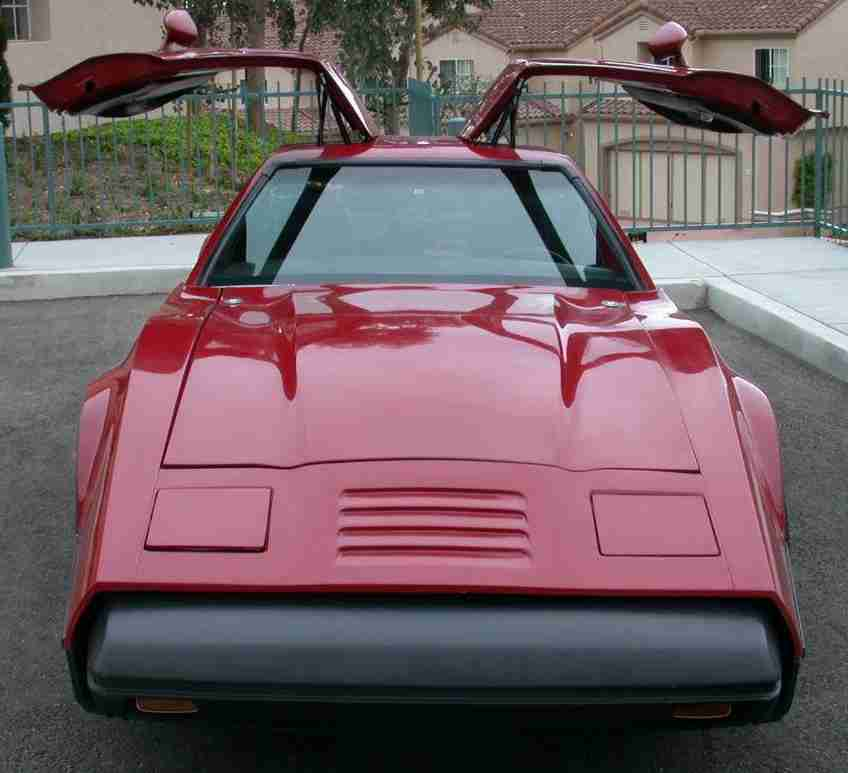
A Bricklin SV-1 with its doors open

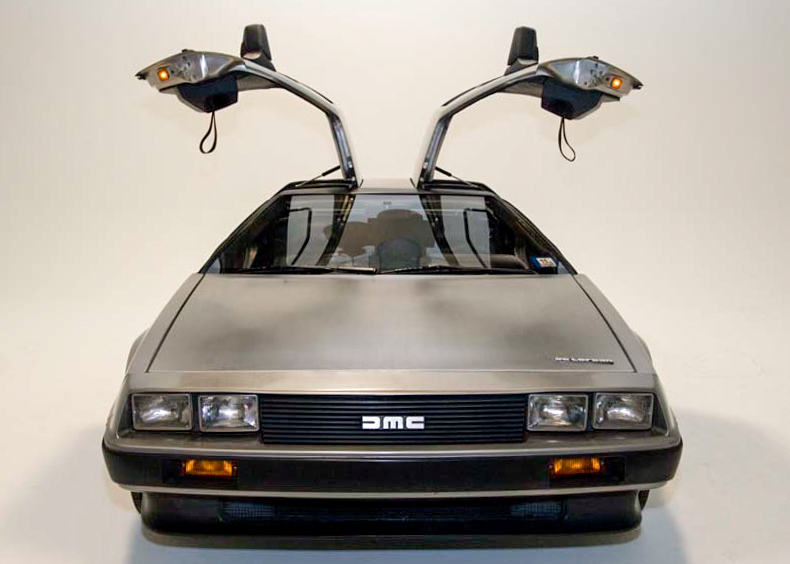
A DMC DeLorean with its doors open

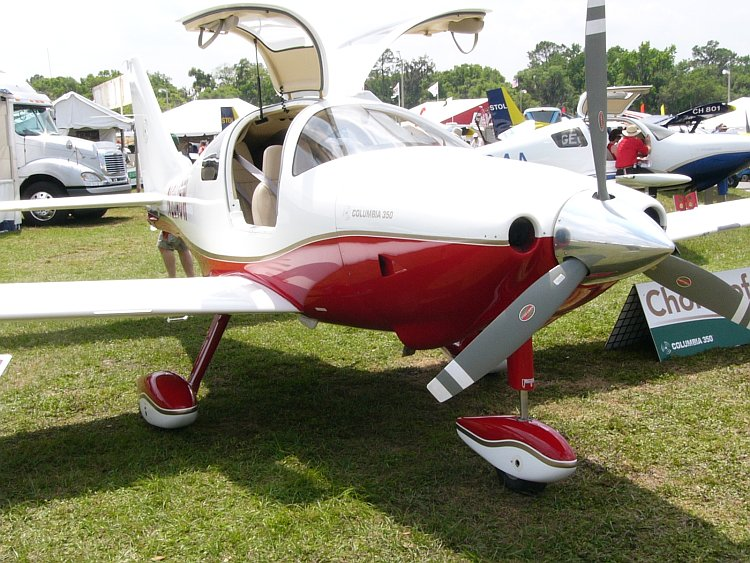
A Cessna 350 light aircraft with its gull-wing doors open

A gull-wing door, also known as a falcon-wing door or anhedral door, is a car door hinged at the roof rather than the side. It was pioneered by Mercedes-Benz 300 SL, first as a race car in 1952 (W194) and then as a production sports car in 1954.

Opening upwards, the doors evoke the image of a seagull's wings. In French, they are called portes papillon ("butterfly doors"), although the term butterfly doors usually refers to a different design that opens both upward and forward. The papillon door was designed by Jean Bugatti for the 1939 Type 64, 13 years before Mercedes-Benz produced its similar, famous 300 SL gullwing door. The papillon door is a precursor to the gullwing door, and is slightly different in its architecture, but is often overlooked when discussing gull-wing design. Conventional car doors are typically hinged at the front-facing edge of the door, with the door swinging outward horizontally.

Apart from the Mercedes-Benz 300 SL of the mid-1950s and the Mercedes-Benz SLS AMG, the best-known examples of road-cars with gull-wing doors are the DMC DeLorean from the 1980s and the Tesla Model X of the 2010s. Gull-wing doors have also been used in aircraft designs, such as the four-seat single-engine Socata TB series built in France.

While a gull-wing design is typically used for doors into the passenger compartment, some cars have used a similar design on the engine compartment doors, such as the De Tomaso Mangusta, as well as for the door windows only, such as the BMW Nazca C2 and Chevrolet Corvette Moray concept cars.

== Practical considerations ==
The design can be a very practical one in a tight urban parking space. When properly designed and counterbalanced, they require little side-clearance to open (about 27.5 cm or 11" in the DeLorean) and allow much better entrance/egress than conventional doors. The most obvious downside to having gull-wing doors is that, were the car to roll over and come to rest on its roof, exit by the doors would be impossible, requiring a large window opening to escape. The Mercedes SLS solved this problem by fitting explosive bolts in the hinges, which would blow up if the car rolled over, causing the door to fall off altogether.

The Volvo YCC, a concept car designed by and for women, had gull-wing doors as part of its design. Gull-wing doors make it easier to lift a bag to store it behind the driver's seat, increase visibility over the driver's shoulder, and make it easier to get in and out of the car.

The Tesla Model X, introduced in 2015 and discontinued in 2026, has double-hinged gull-wing doors, called falcon-wing doors by Tesla. The Model X has several design considerations to make the doors more practical. Being double-hinged allows them to open with less clearance (horizontal and vertical) than would otherwise be required. The vehicle also has sensors to determine ceiling height and the presence of potential obstacles and to determine how the hinges will operate to open the doors and avoid obstacles, if possible.

== Design challenges ==
Gull-wing doors have a blemished reputation, largely because of early examples like the Mercedes and the Bricklin. The 300 SL used the gullwing design because its tubular frame race car chassis had a very high door sill, and originally a side sill without any door, similar to NASCAR race cars having their doors welded shut and drivers having to enter and exit through the side windows only. In combination with the low roof of the SL race car, this made its side window openings very small, but Mercedes engineers solved the problem by opening a part of the roof. Thus, in its first races, the 300 SL doors were basically only gullwing windows that opened above the side sill. For the 1952 24 Hours of Le Mans, scrutineers demanded larger doors, and new chassis had to be made, with doors that cut half way into the sides. This design was used for the 1954 300 SL Gullwing road cars that were discontinued already in 1957 in favour of the 300 SL Roadster similar to the smaller Mercedes-Benz 190 SL.

The small series of Porsche 906 Carrera 6 street-legal sportscar racing cars made in early 1966 had introduced lightweight fiberglass bodies, and gullwing doors with hinges on the roof that had issues with remaining properly closed at high speed. Already in mid 1966, the updated Porsche 910 had doors that hinged forward at the A-pillar, which also allowed that the center of the roof could be removed.

The 1970s Bricklin had a more conventionally sized door, but the actuation system was unreliable in day-to-day use until an aftermarket air-door upgrade was installed in all Bricklins. In addition, there was speculation that in making the doors as light as possible, they wouldn't provide adequate protection in side-impact accidents.

The 1980s DeLorean solved these problems by using a patented cryogenically set stainless steel torsion bar spring (manufactured by Grumman Aircraft Engineering Corporation) to partially counterbalance a full-sized door, and then added a gas-pressurized (pneumatic) strut similar to those found in hatchback cars. The combination of the torsion spring and strut provided the necessary torque to offset the torque of the door, as it opened through a rotational angle of about 80 degrees. The torsion bar is most important in the first foot of movement from the bottom, where the geometry of the strut is pointed at the hinge and therefore at a mechanical disadvantage. The spring relaxes as the door rotates open, and the strut gains a better moment arm and gradually takes over the effort. A correctly balanced door opens fully on its own by simply activating the door latch from the interior, exterior, or from an aftermarket wireless release.

Other disadvantages of the system were not so easy to address. For example, the gull-wing design for a convertible version of a car is not possible, as the hinges would be removed with the roof, and standard doors would be needed for a convertible. Mercedes did so when replacing the gullwing coupe altogether with the 300SL roadster for 1958. It was never a concern for DeLorean, since no convertible version was ever planned.

Sealing the car against water leaks and snow intrusion is more difficult because of the shape and movement path of the door itself.

== List of models ==
This is a (partial) list of cars with gull-wing doors:

=== Production cars ===
- Apollo Intensa Emozione
- Aston Martin Valkyrie
- Autozam AZ-1 (Suzuki Cara)
- Bricklin SV-1
- Bristol Fighter
- Bugatti Type 64
- De Tomaso Mangusta (engine compartment)
- DMC DeLorean
- Gumpert Apollo
- HiPhi X (rear passenger doors only)
- Hofstetter Turbo
- Hyptec HT (rear passenger doors only)
- Isdera Imperator 108i
- Marcos Luton Gullwing
- Marcos Xylon GT
- McLaren W1
- Melkus RS 1000
- Melkus RS 2000
- Mercedes-Benz 300SL
- Mercedes-Benz SLS AMG
- (NSU) Thurner RS
- Pagani Huayra
- Porsche 906
- Tesla Model X (rear passenger doors only)
Automobiles with gull-wing doors

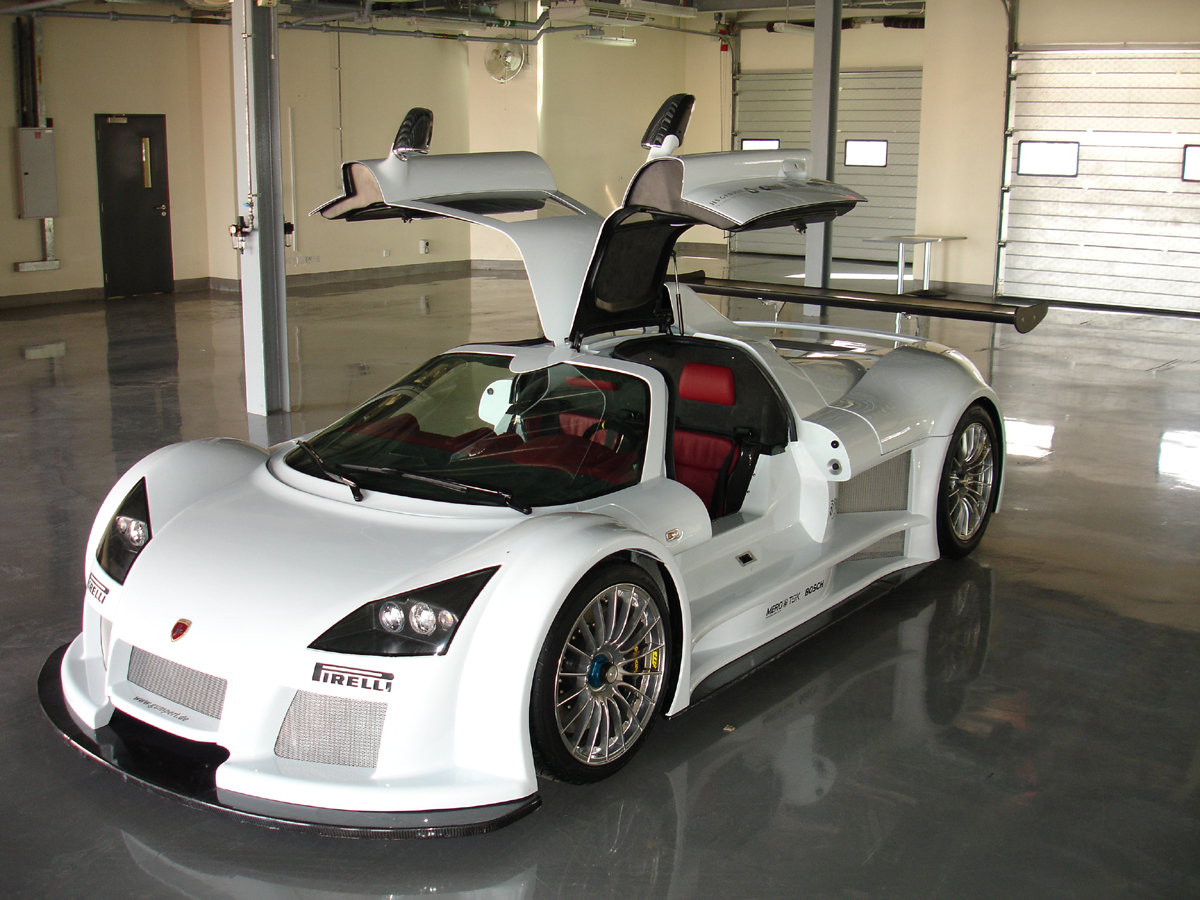
Gumpert Apollo

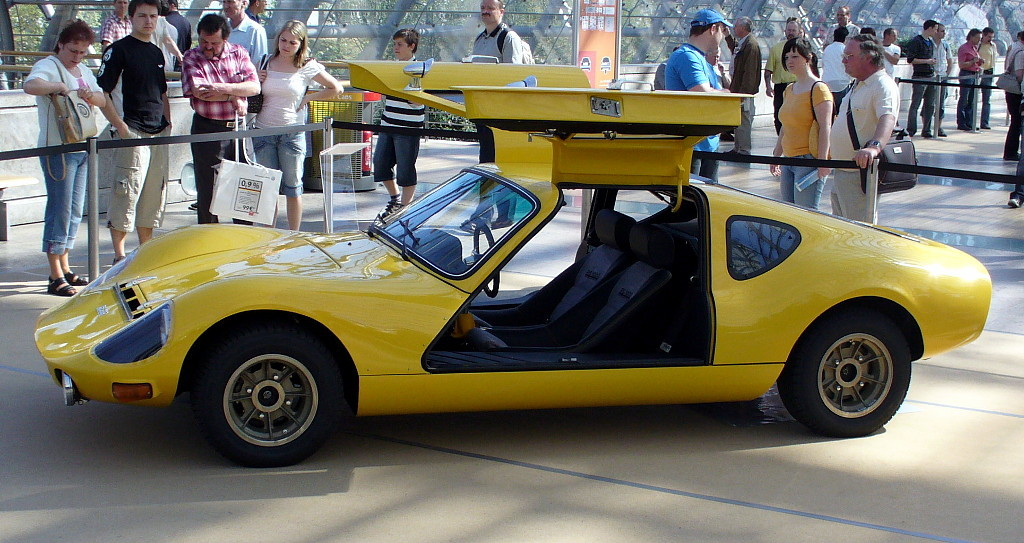
Melkus RS 1000

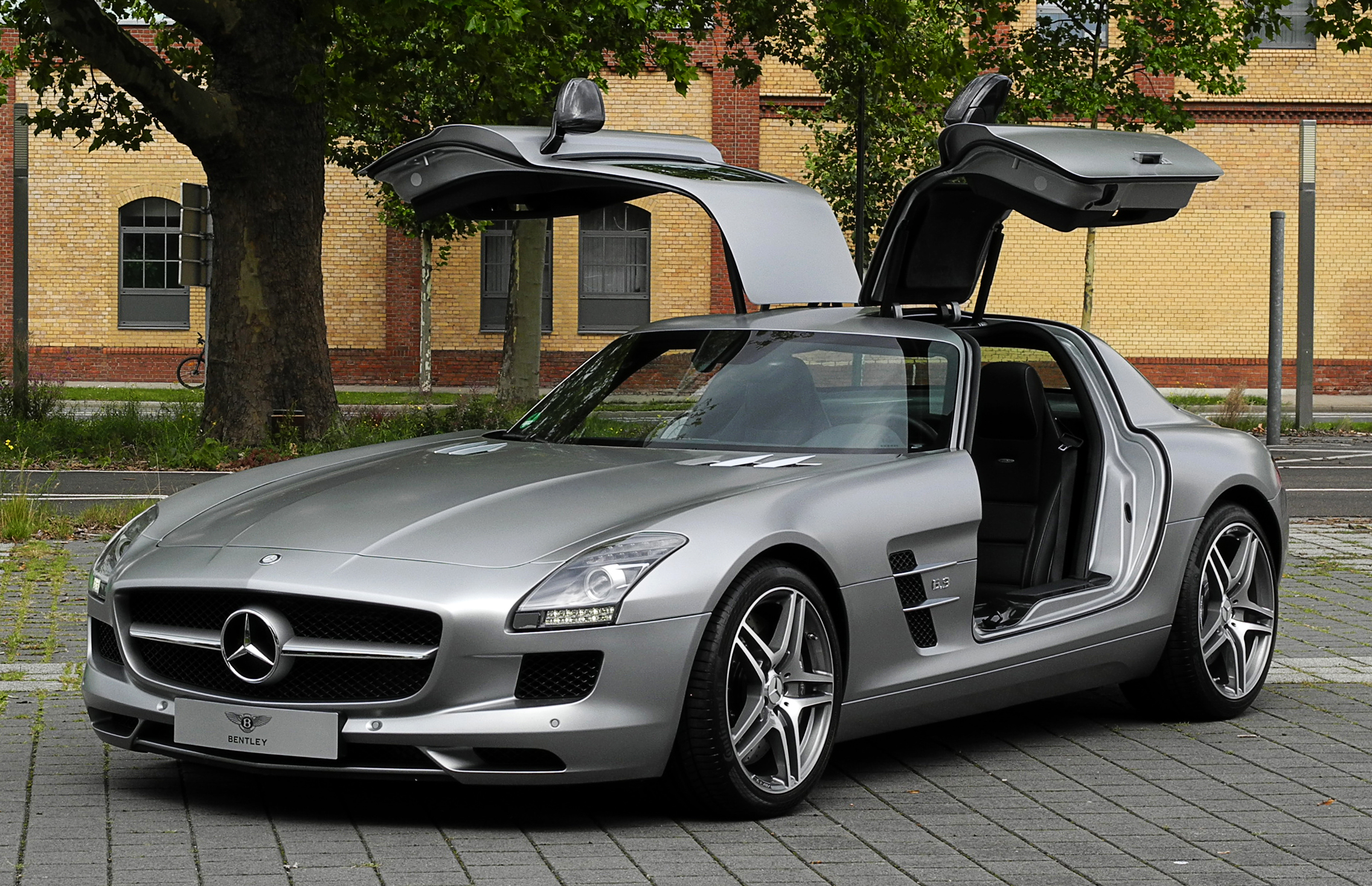
Mercedes-Benz SLS AMG, a modern homage to the 300SL

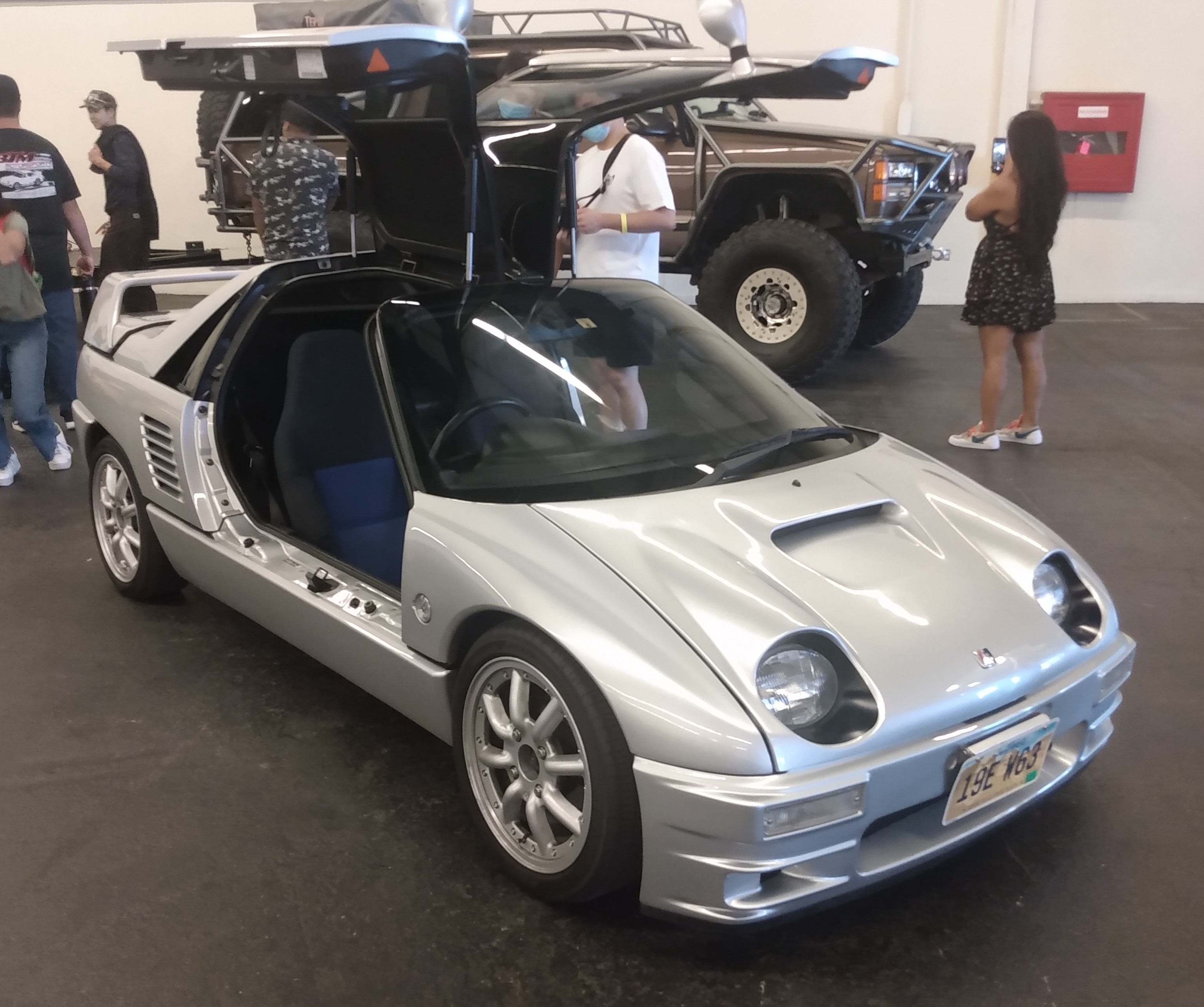
Autozam AZ-1

=== Kit cars ===
Gullwing doors are common in kit cars, and many are not included on this list:

- AMT Piranha
- Bradley GTII
- Dare DZ
- Eagle SS Mk1
- Elite Enterprises Laser 917, inspired by the Porsche 917
- Embeesea Charger
- Fiberfab Aztec 7, an American replica of the Italian Alfa Romeo Carabo concept car.
- Fiberfab Caribee/Banshee
- Illuminati Motor Works Seven
- Innes Lee Scorpion K19
- Pelland Sports
- Replicar Cursor
- RPB GT
- Burton Car Company hardtop
- Siva S160 Spyder
- Ultima Mk1
- Ultima Mk2
- Ultima Mk3
- Ultima Sport
- Ultima GTR

=== Concept and non-production cars ===
- Aston Martin Bulldog
- BMW Nazca C2 (windows only)
- BMW Turbo
- Chevrolet Aerovette
- Ford Cougar 406
- Ford Evos (concept)
- Isdera CW311
- Isdera L'Aquila
- Isdera Commendatore 112i (doors and engine compartment)
- Isdera Commendatore GT
- Isdera Erator GTE
- Lamborghini Marzal
- Lexus LF-30
- Lincoln Navigator Concept (2018)
- Mercedes-Benz C111
- Mercedes-Benz C112
- Mercedes-Maybach 6
- Mercedes Vision One-Eleven
- Pontiac Trans Sport concept (rear doors only)
- Porsche Tapiro
- Quant E
- Quant F
- Volvo YCC

== Aircraft ==
- Cessna 350
- Diamond DA62
- Socata TB
- Beriev Be-103
- Stoddard-Hamilton Glasair II
- Dornier Seastar

== See also ==
- Butterfly doors
- Canopy door
- Car door
- List of cars with non-standard door designs
- Scissor doors
- Sliding doors
- Suicide doors
- Swan doors
