= Ford Cougar 406 =

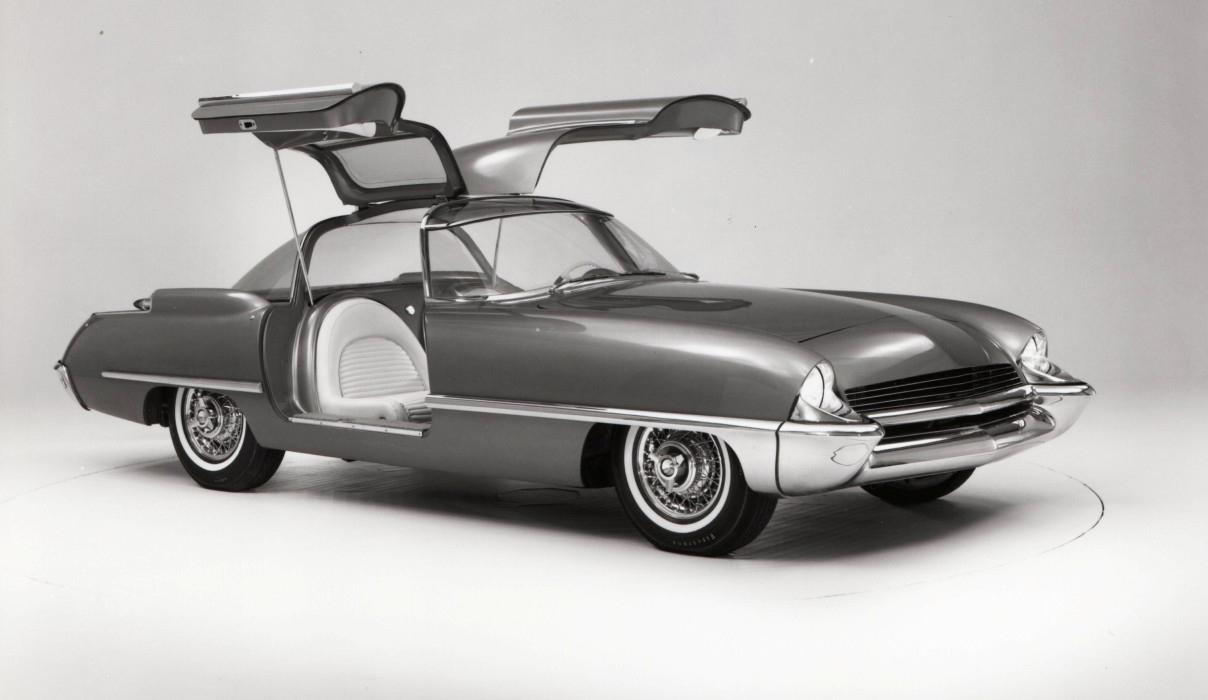

Overview
- Manufacturer: Ford
- Also called: Cougar I
- Production: 1962

Body and chassis
- Class: Concept car
- Layout: Front engine, rear-wheel-drive

Powertrain
- Engine: 6,647 cc (405.6 cu in; 6.647 L) (4.13 in × 3.785 in (104.9 mm × 96.1 mm)) Ford 406 V8
- Power output: 405 bhp (411 PS; 302 kW) at 5,800 rpm 607 N⋅m (448 lbf⋅ft) at 3,500 rpm
- Transmission: 4-speed manual

Dimensions
- Wheelbase: 102.0 inches (2,590 mm)
- Length: 180.0 inches (4,570 mm)
- Width: 75.72 inches (1,923 mm)
- Height: 49.50 inches (1,257 mm)
- Curb weight: 2,500.0 pounds (1,134.0 kg)

The Ford Cougar 406 is a concept car for the Ford Thunderbird built by Dean Jeffries for Ford. The Cougar featured Mercedes 300 SL-type gullwing doors, and was originally painted in Candy Apple Red. The car was unveiled at the 1962 Chicago Auto Show. The original was a 3/8-scale model from 1956. This was the second car to be under the Cougar nameplate. The car has 405 horsepower. On the car there was swing-up headlights on the front fenders.

In 1963, the Cougar was used in Frederick Brisson's film version of his Broadway comedy hit "Under the Yum Yum Tree".
