= American used vehicle exporting =

Grey market international trade

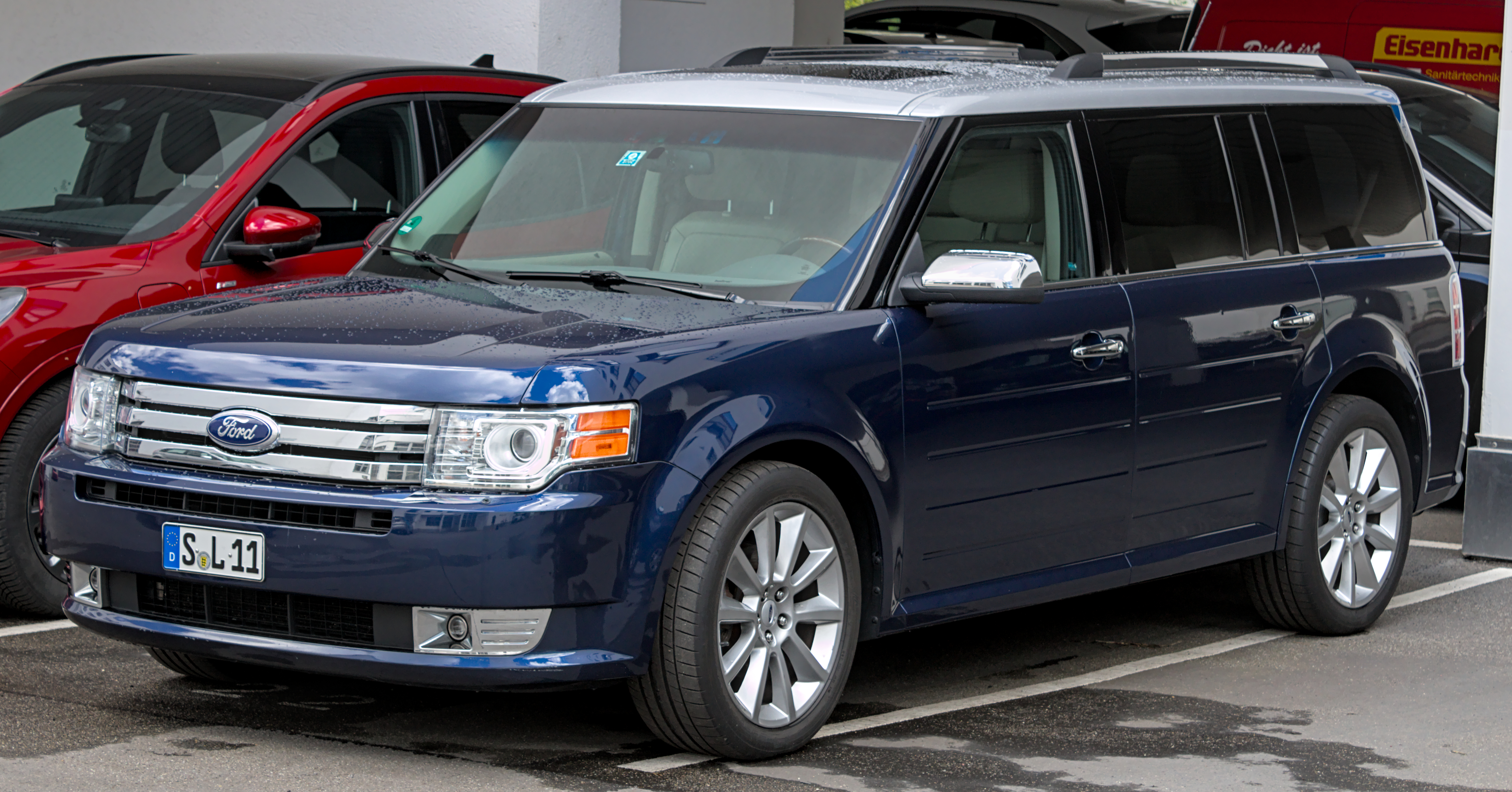
A Ford Flex in Stuttgart-Vaihingen, Germany.

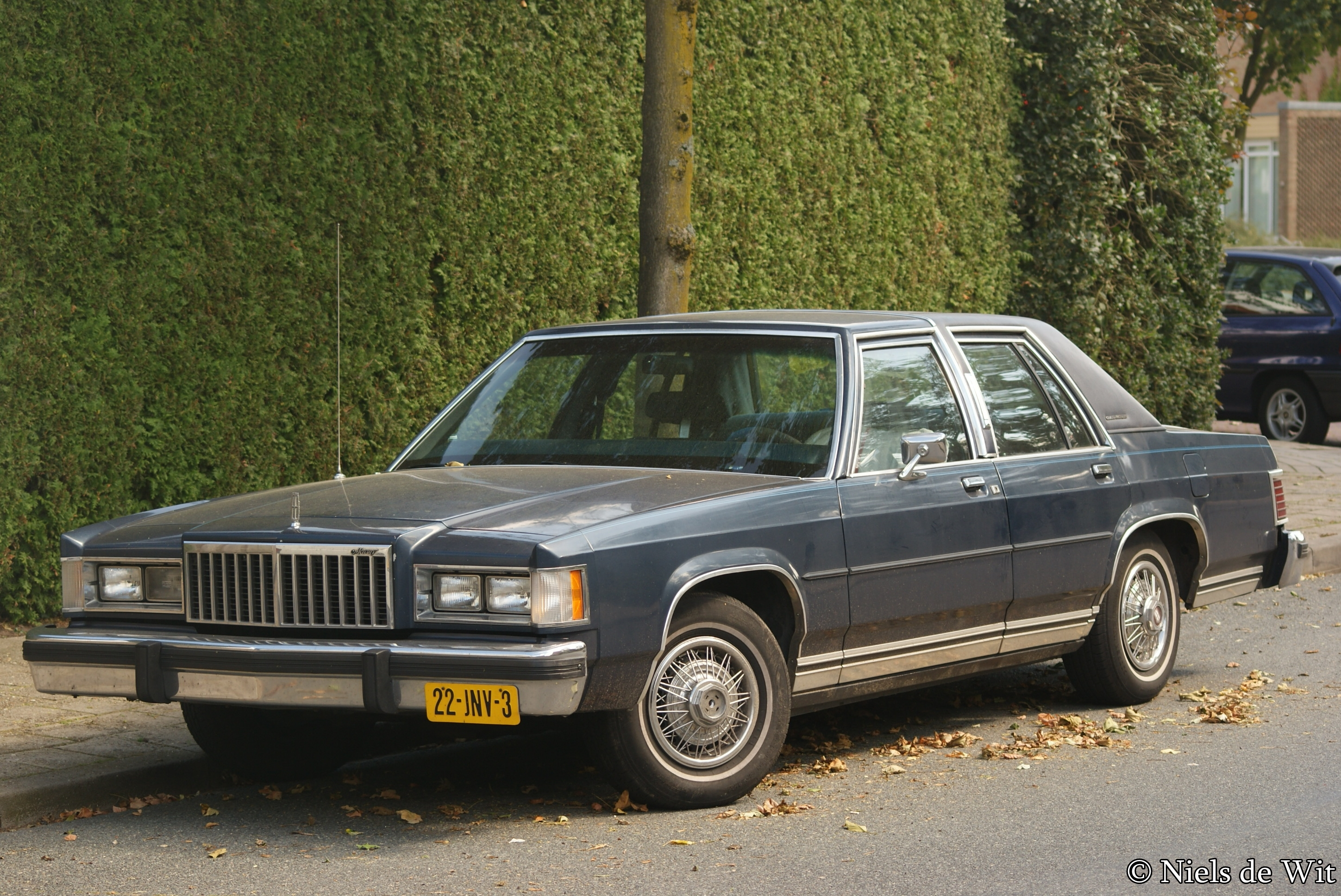
A US imported Mercury Grand Marquis registered in the Netherlands.

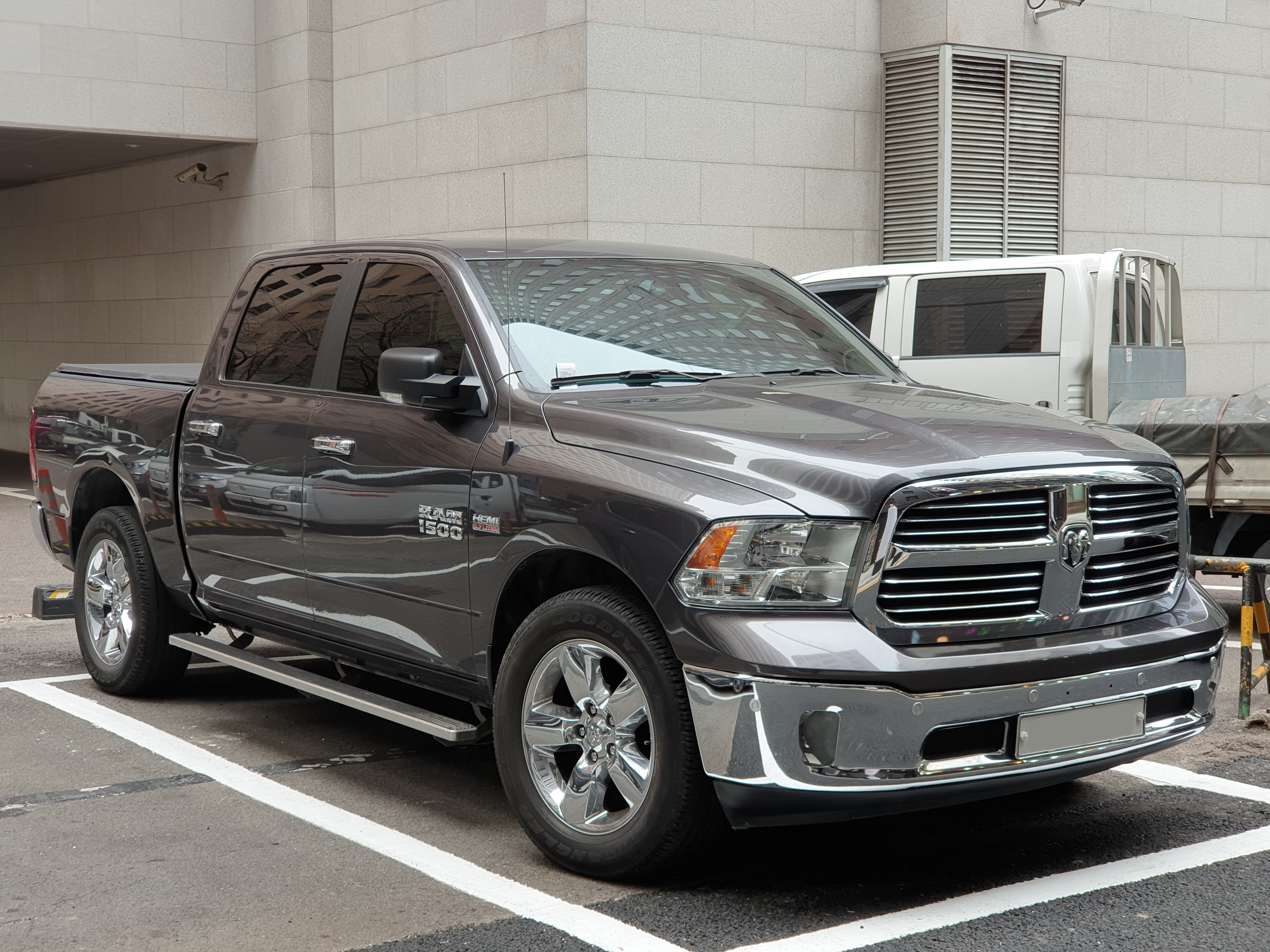
A Ram 1500 in South Korea.

American used vehicle exporting is a grey-market international trade involving the exporting of used vehicles from the United States to international markets.

It's reported that $8 billion worth of used American vehicles were exported in 2021.

== History ==
In 2015, Carfax issued a warning that used American vehicles exported to Europe may have questionable conditions. Many of them, however, were exported to Lithuania with repairs made there because of the cheap price prior to being sold elsewhere in the EU.

In October 2020, it was reported that most used American-made vehicles are exported to United Arab Emirates as the top export market, followed by Nigeria, Georgia, Mexico, Jordan, Ukraine, Cambodia and the Dominican Republic. In 2021, American vehicles were also exported to Oman, Guatemala, Lithuania and Germany.

Due to sanctions placed on Russia after the start of the Russian-Ukrainian War in 2022, Russians have opted to purchase American vehicles in Georgia since car plants in the country were closed in order to comply with sanctions.

== Restrictions ==
=== Cayman Islands ===
The Cayman Islands government announced on May 1, 2023 that the cabinet approved, on April 25, 2023, changes in Customs and Border Control (Prohibited Goods) (Amendment) Order, 2023 that restrict the importation of used vehicles from 2016 to 2023. Exceptions are made for classic/antique vehicles and vehicles meant for agricultural work, construction, maintenance or engineering vehicles older than 8 years.

=== Ukraine ===
The Verkhovna Rada, in 2006, prohibits imports of used cars that are more than eight years old, except if they're used for humanitarian purposes. Vehicles have to meet at least Euro 2 emission standards and above.
