= EUCD =

EUCD may refer to:

- European Union Copyright Directive, one of the intellectual property directives of the European Union, especially the Copyright and Information Society Directive 2001
- European Union of Christian Democrats, a predecessor of the current European People's Party
- Ford EUCD platform, a midsize car automobile platform launched in 2006
