= Ford Taurus (China) =

Full-size car

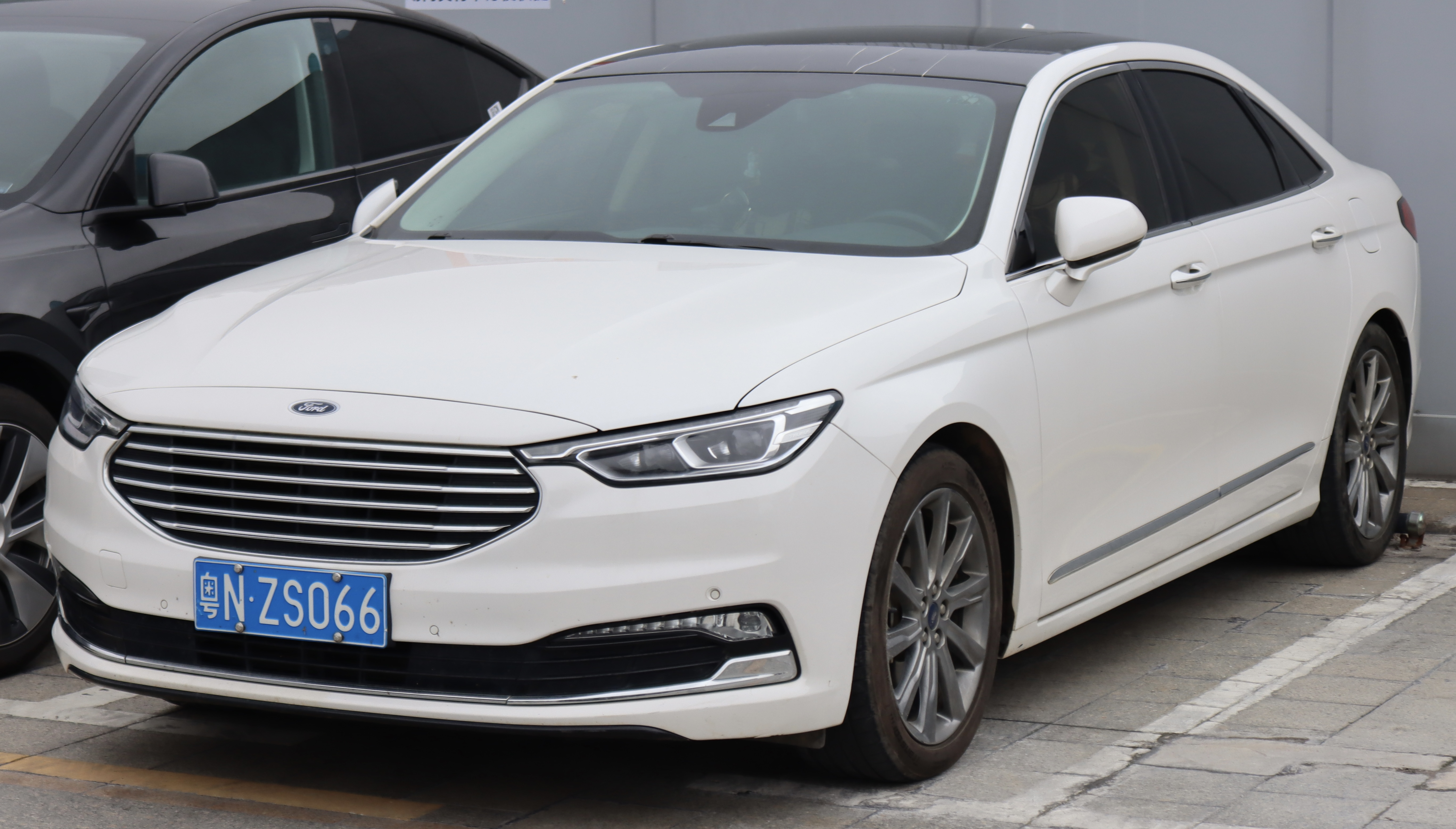
- Ford Taurus VII facelift

Overview
- Manufacturer: Changan Ford
- Production: 2015–2022
- Model years: 2016–2022
- Assembly: Hangzhou, Zhejiang, China (Changan Ford Hangzhou Plant)
- Designer: Bogusław Paruch, Berk Keskin, Andrea di Buduo, Dillon Blanski, Ernesto Rupar

Body and chassis
- Class: Full-size car
- Body style: 4-door sedan
- Layout: Front-engine, front-wheel drive
- Platform: Ford CD4 platform
- Related: Lincoln Continental; Ford Fusion/Mondeo; Lincoln MKZ

Powertrain
- Engine: 1.5 L CAF479QA3 I4; 2.0 L EcoBoost I4; 2.7 L EcoBoost V6
- Transmission: 6-speed automatic 8-speed automatic (2019)

Dimensions
- Wheelbase: 116.1 in (2,949 mm)
- Length: 196.7 in (4,996 mm)
- Width: 73.9 in (1,878 mm)
- Height: 59.2 in (1,503 mm)

Chronology
- Predecessor: Ford Taurus (sixth generation) (exports)
- Successor: Ford Mondeo (fifth generation)

The Ford Taurus (Chinese: 福特金牛座) is a full-size car produced by Ford in China through the Changan Ford joint venture for the Chinese and Middle Eastern markets. Sharing only its nameplate with its 1986-2019 American namesake, the Taurus was developed in conjunction with Ford Australia.

== Model overview ==
Produced by Changan Ford in its Hangzhou facility, exports of the Chinese Ford Taurus model line did not begin until 2020, when GCC (Middle East) exports commenced, replacing the American-produced Taurus.

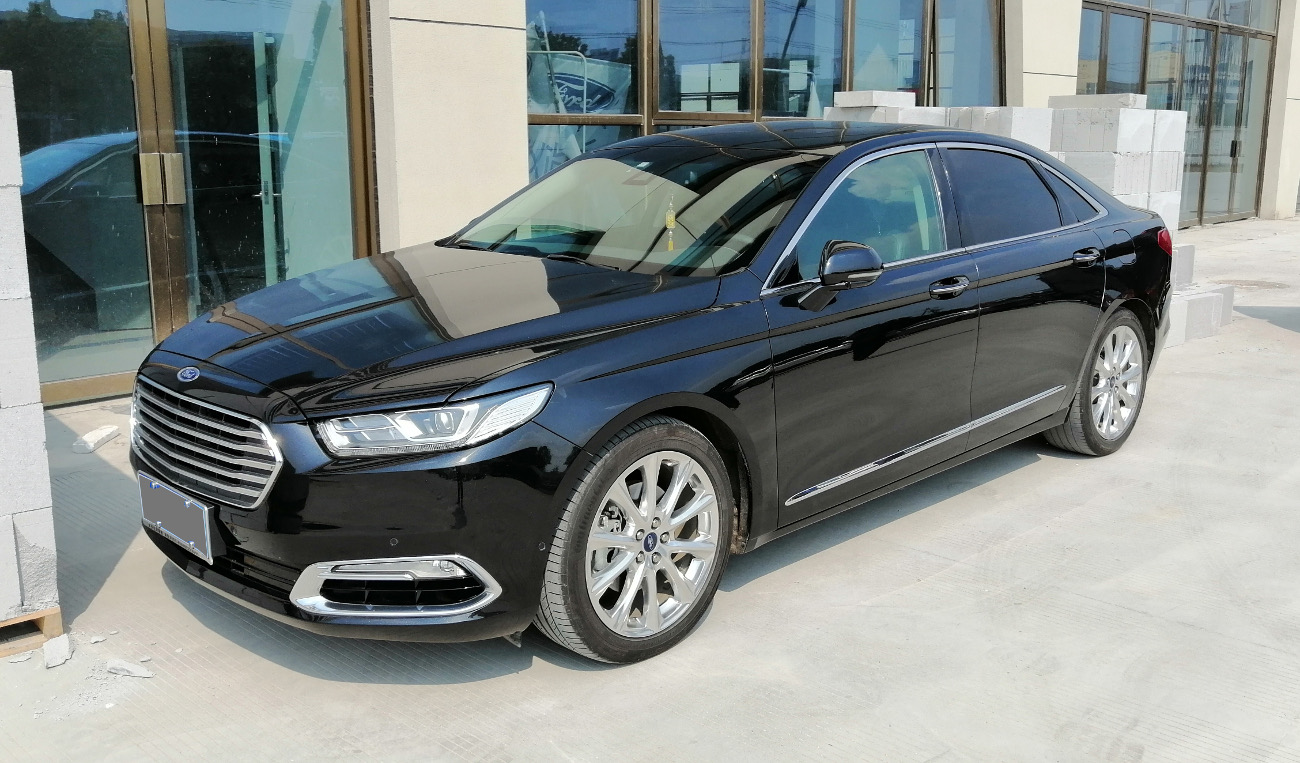
Ford Taurus VII front

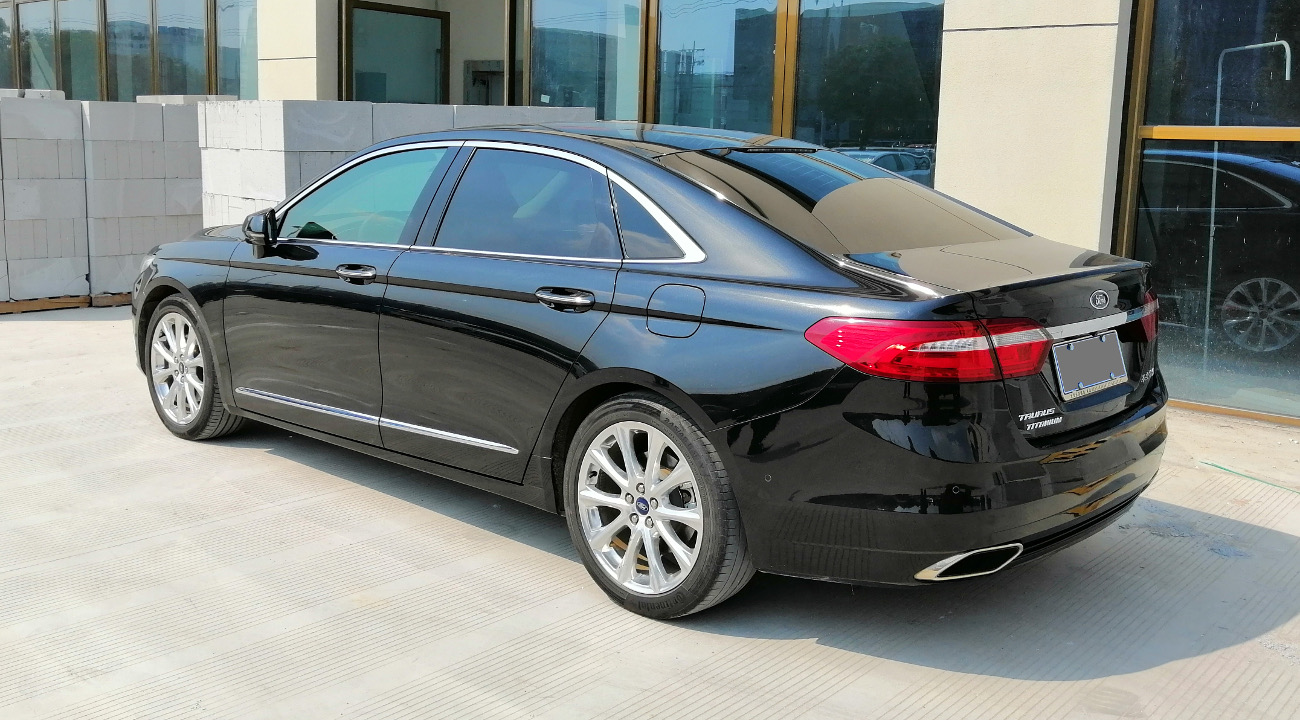
Ford Taurus VII rear

The Changan Ford Taurus is derived from the Ford CD4 platform while adding 3.9 inches (9.9 cm) to the wheelbase of the Ford Fusion/Ford Mondeo. The Changan Ford Taurus also shares its platform architecture with the Lincoln Continental, making the Taurus the flagship Ford sedan for Chinese markets. While sharing similar front and rear fascia designs with the Mondeo, the Taurus was styled with a formal rear roofline.

At its launch, a 2.0L EcoBoost inline-4 engine (an option for the sixth-generation Taurus) producing 245 hp (183 kW; 248 PS) and 350 N⋅m (258 lb⋅ft) is standard, with an optional 2.7L EcoBoost V6 engine (used in the Fusion and Lincoln Continental) producing 325 hp (242 kW; 330 PS) and 475 N⋅m (350 lb⋅ft). During 2016, a 1.5L inline-4 engine was added. A 6-speed automatic is the sole transmission offering.

== 2019 facelift ==
A facelift for the Changan Ford Taurus was introduced in August 2019, featuring restyled front and rear end designs and a new powertrain with a 2.0 liter turbo engine with 245 hp (183 kW; 248 PS) and 390 N⋅m (288 lb⋅ft) mated to an 8-speed automatic transmission.

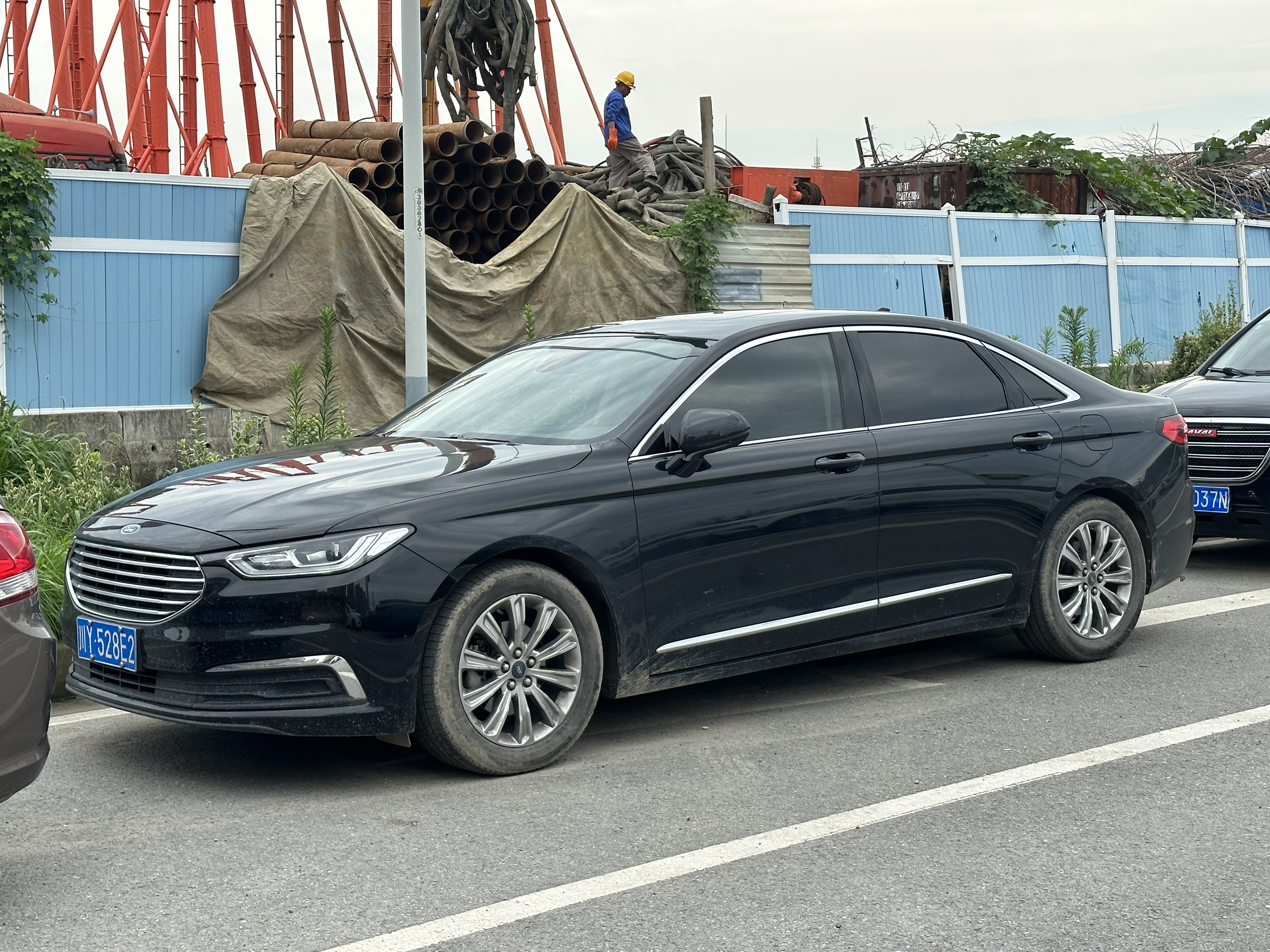
Ford Taurus VII facelift front

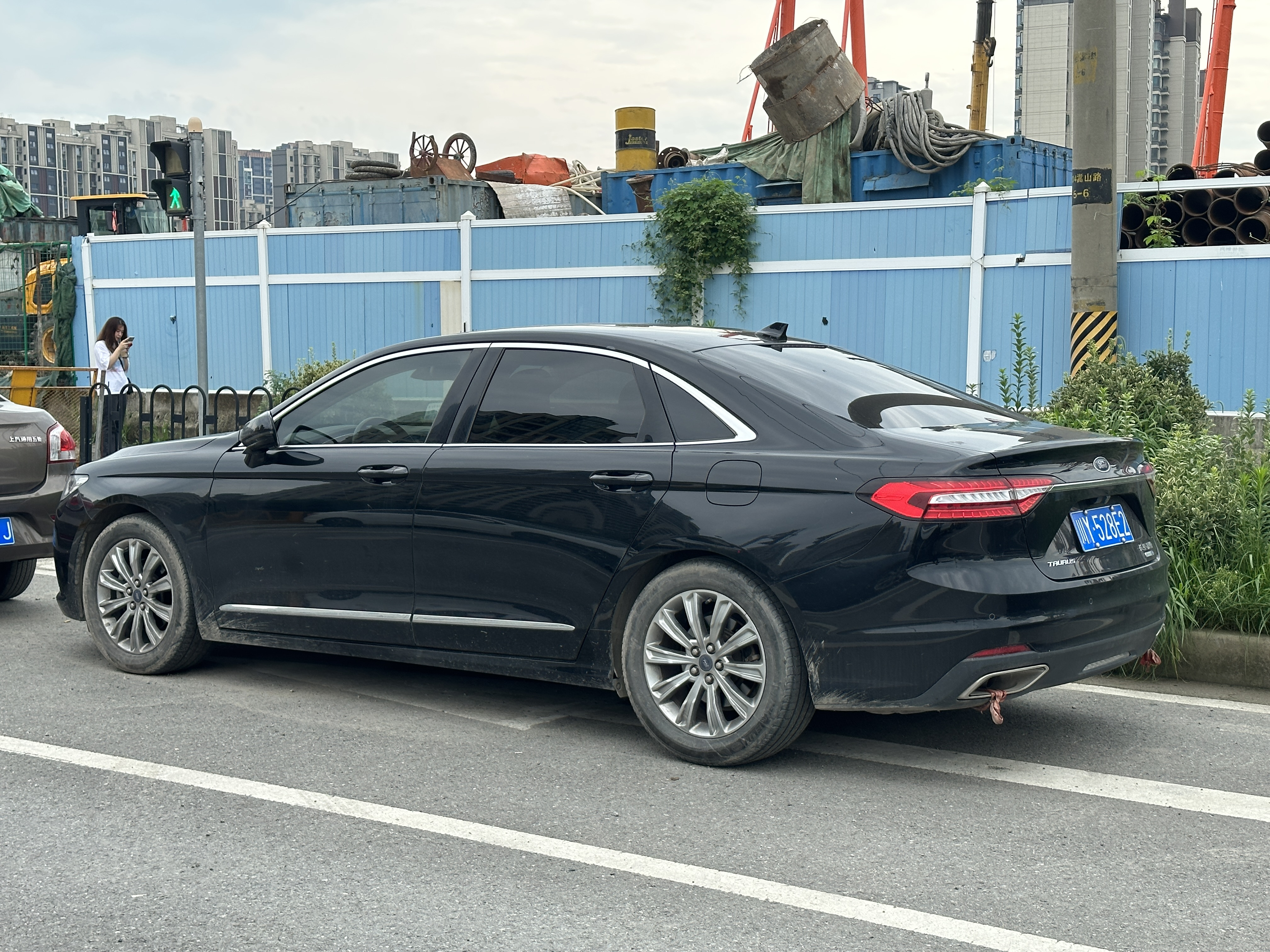
Ford Taurus VII facelift rear
