= Ford CD4 platform =

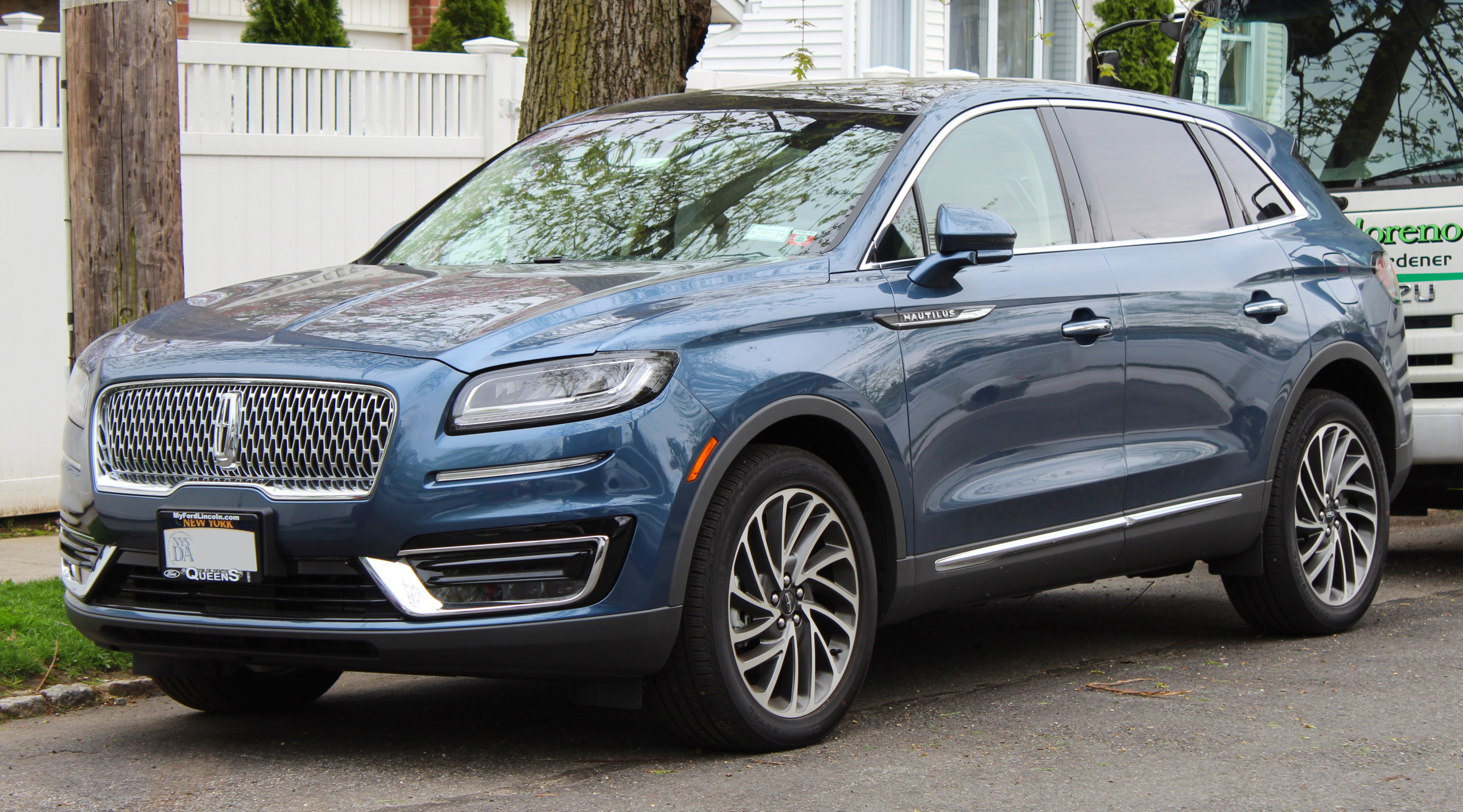

Overview
- Manufacturer: Ford Motor Company
- Production: 2012–2024

Body and chassis
- Class: Mid-size (D) (CD4.1); Mid-size crossover SUV/Large MPV (M) (CD4.2); Full-size (E) (CD4.3)
- Related: Ford EUCD platform Ford C1 platform

Chronology
- Predecessor: Ford CD3 platform Ford EUCD platform Ford D3 platform (Continental)
- Successor: Ford C2 platform (CD4.1 mid-size cars)

The Ford CD4 platform is a Ford global midsize/fullsize automobile platform. The transverse engine platform is designed for either front or all-wheel drive and Ford's hybrid powertrain. Ford Motor Company developed the CD4 platform, as part of the One Ford strategy, to allow it to cut months of development time, reduce costs and bring vehicles to market faster.

CD4 is split into various variants:

- CD4.1: For mid-size cars.
  - 2013–2022 Ford Fusion/Mondeo (CD391)
  - 2013–2020 Lincoln MKZ (CD533)
- CD4.2: For CUVs and MPVs.
  - 2015–2024 Ford Edge (CD539N / CD539X / CD539C / CD389)
  - 2015–2018 / 2019-2023 Lincoln MKX/Nautilus (U540)
  - 2016–2023 Ford S-Max (CD539E / CD389)
  - 2016–2023 Ford Galaxy (CD390)
- CD4.3: Stretched version for full-size cars.
  - 2016–2022 Ford Taurus (China) (D568C)
  - 2016–2020 Lincoln Continental (D544)
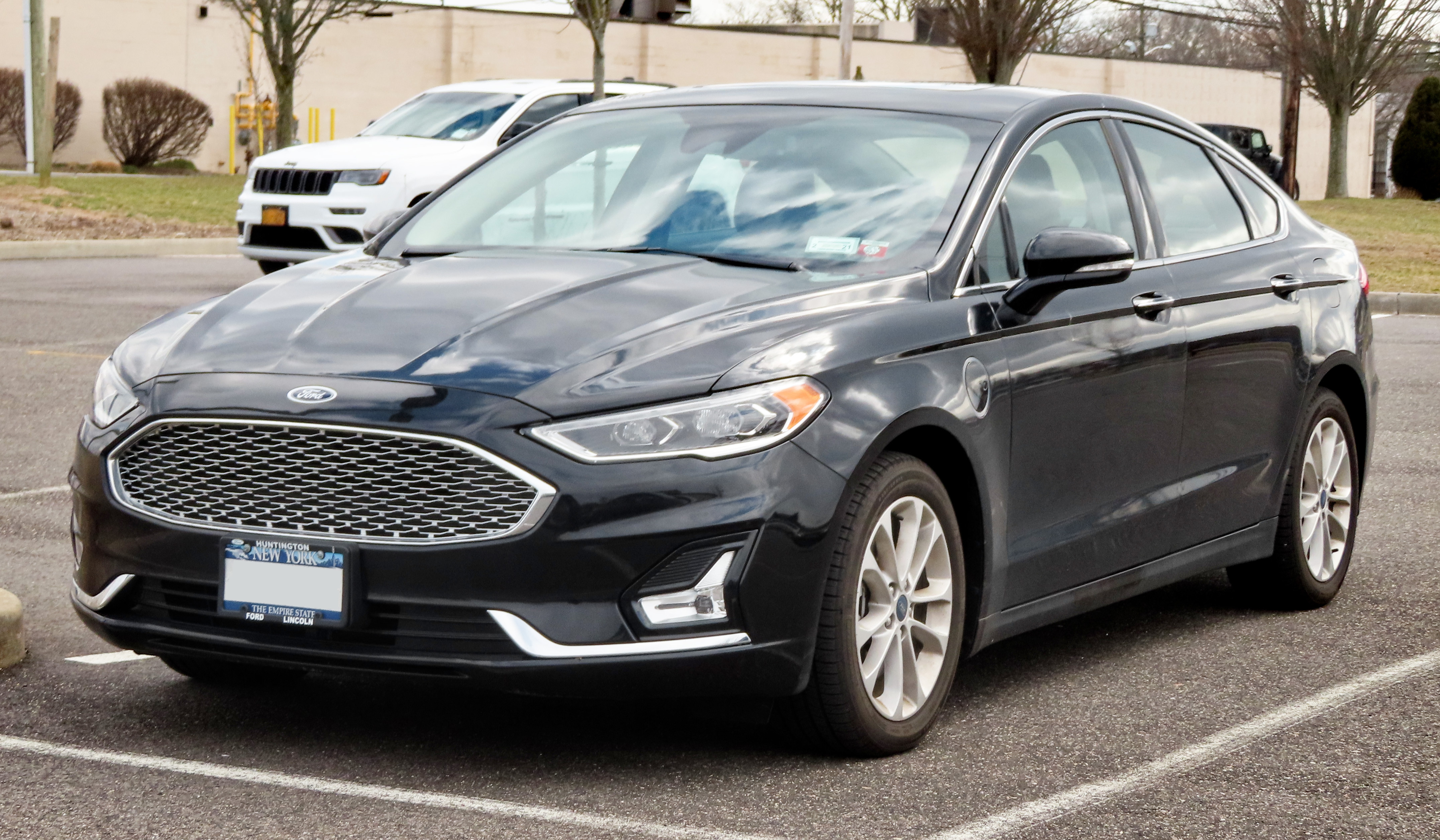
Ford Fusion

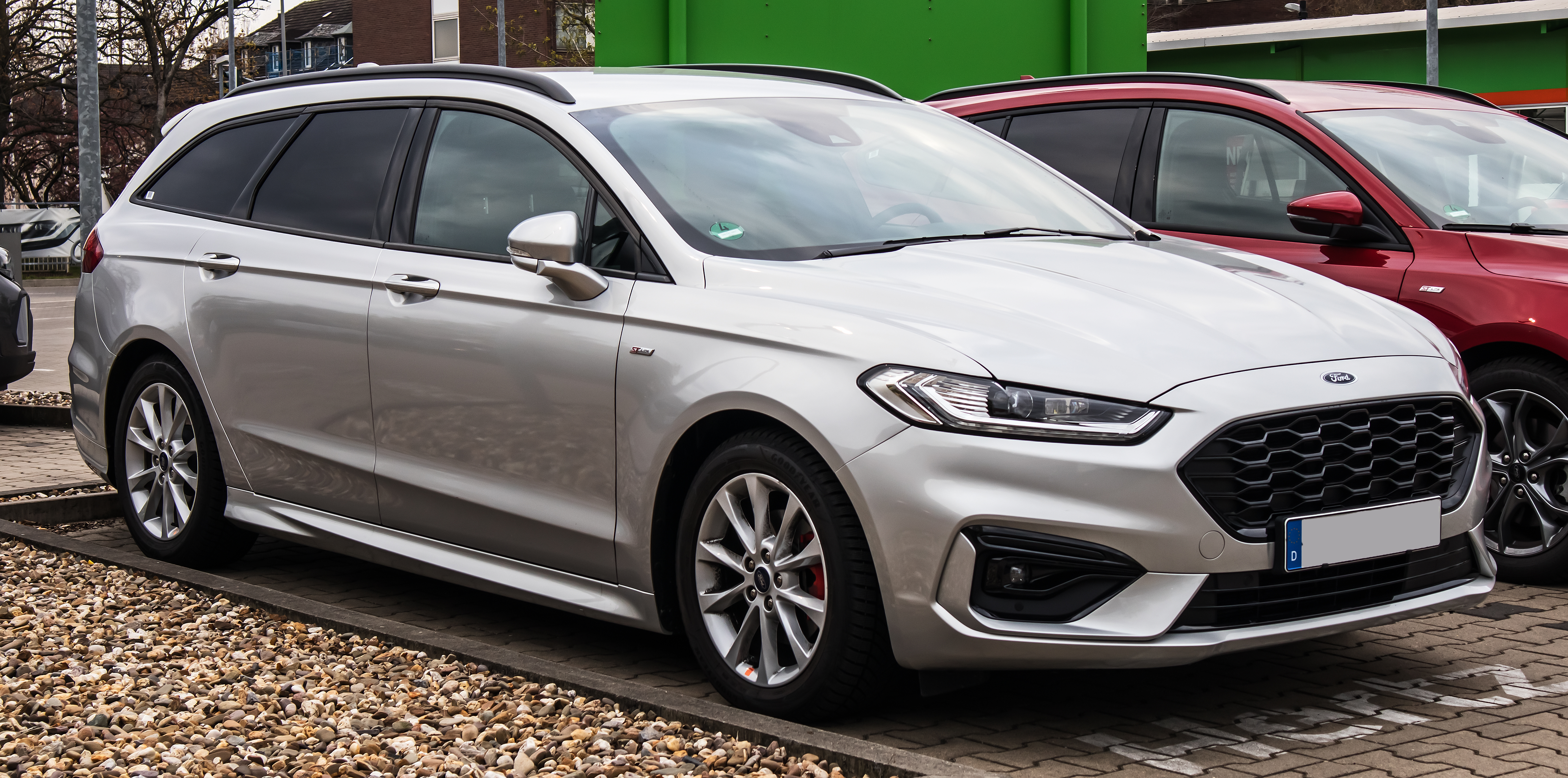
Ford Mondeo

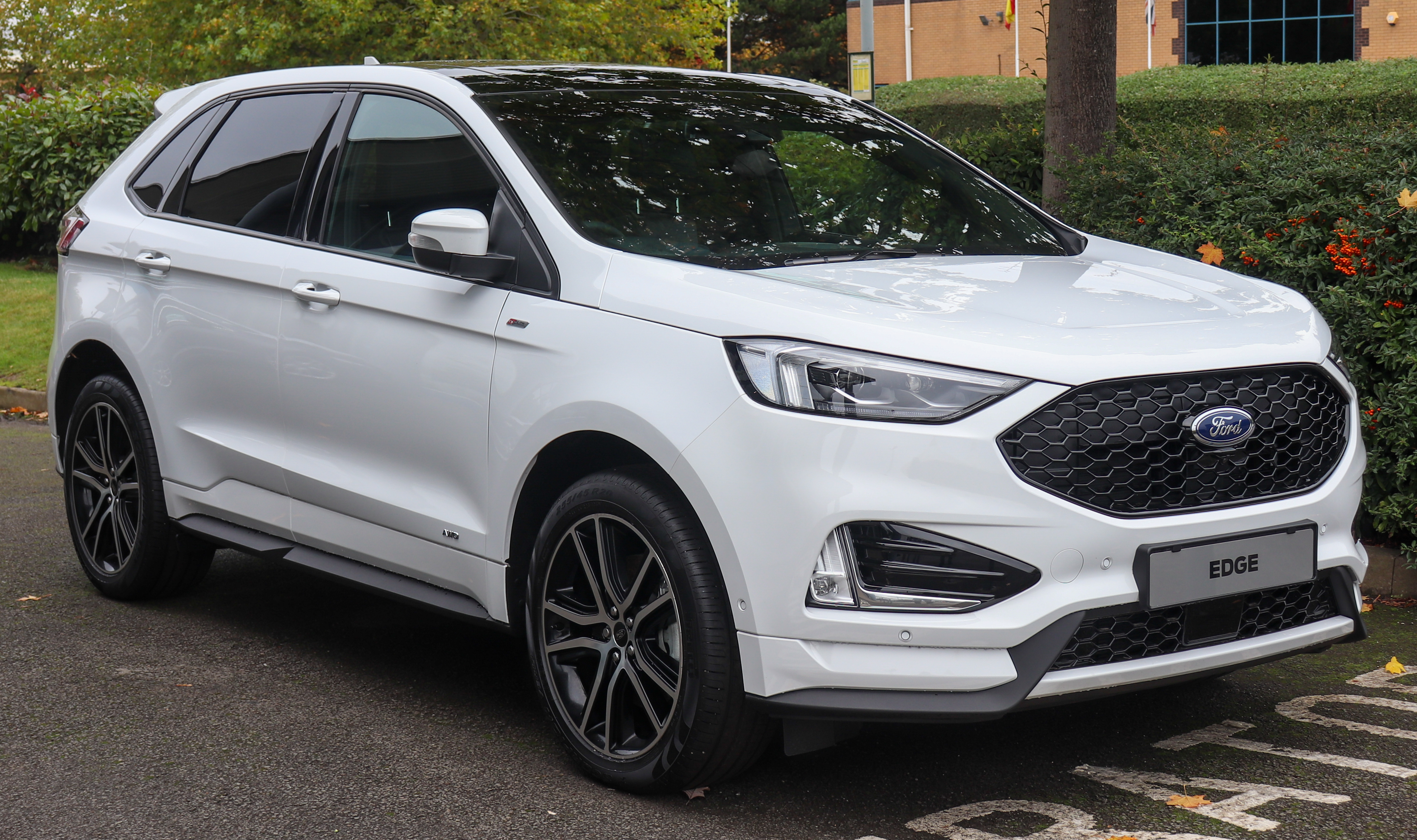
Ford Edge

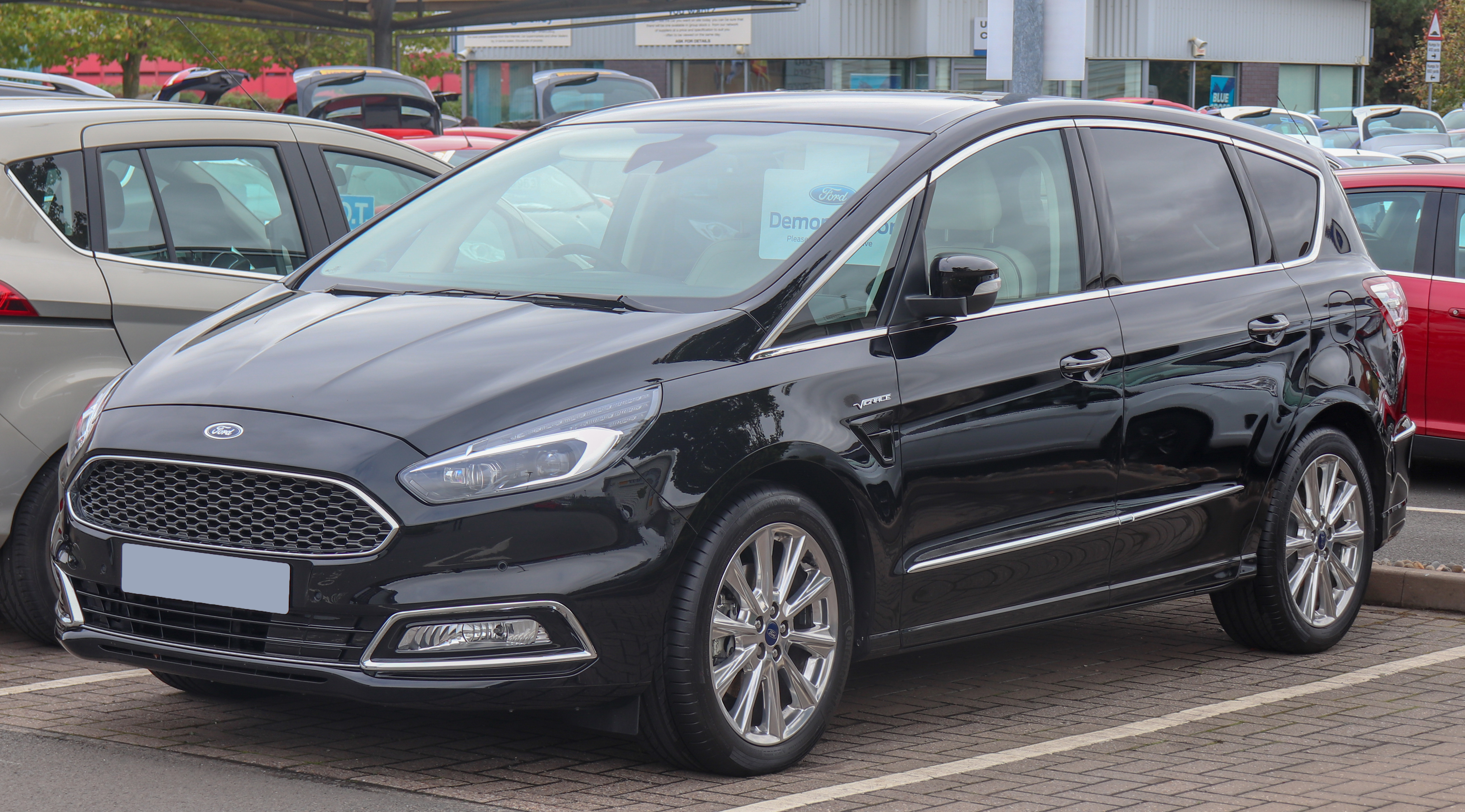
Ford S-Max

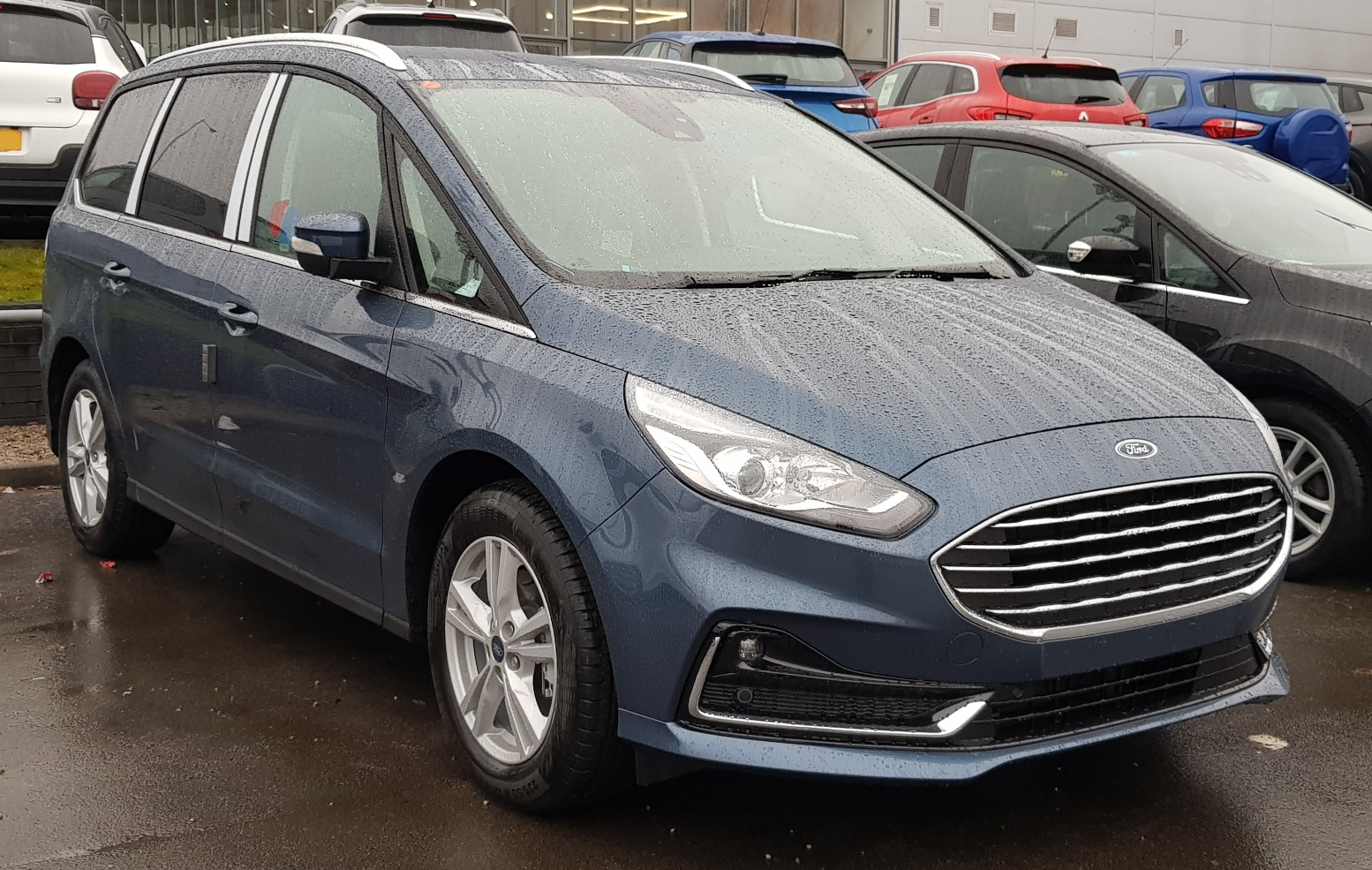
Ford Galaxy

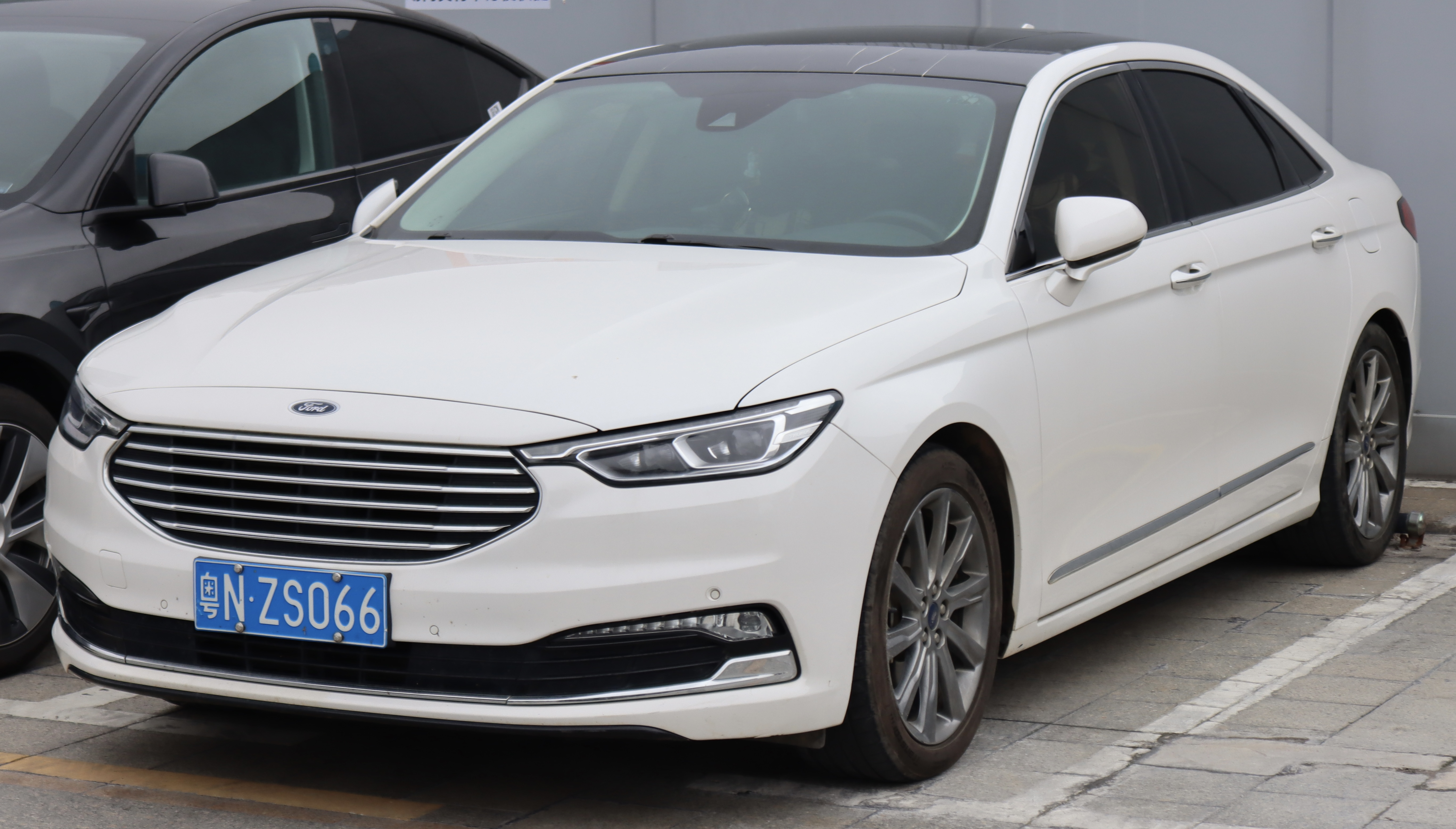
Ford Taurus

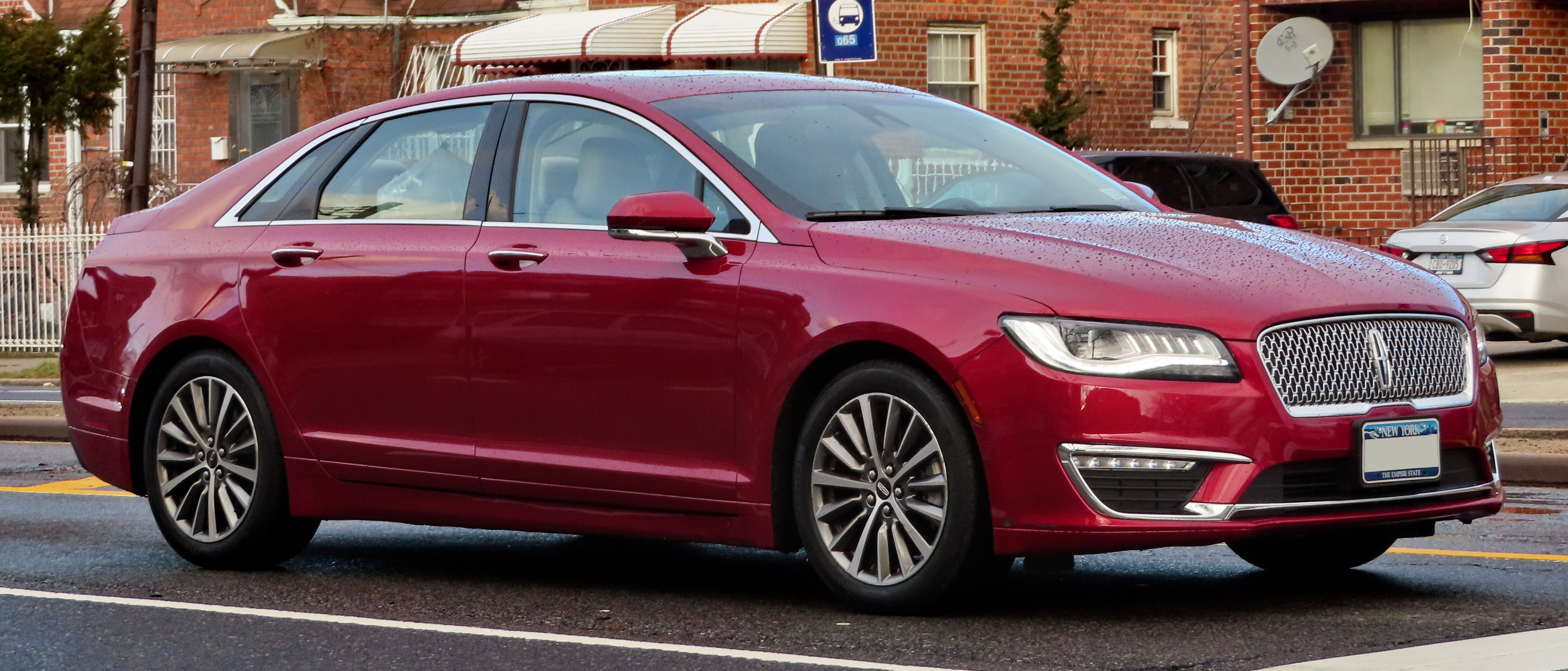
Lincoln MKZ

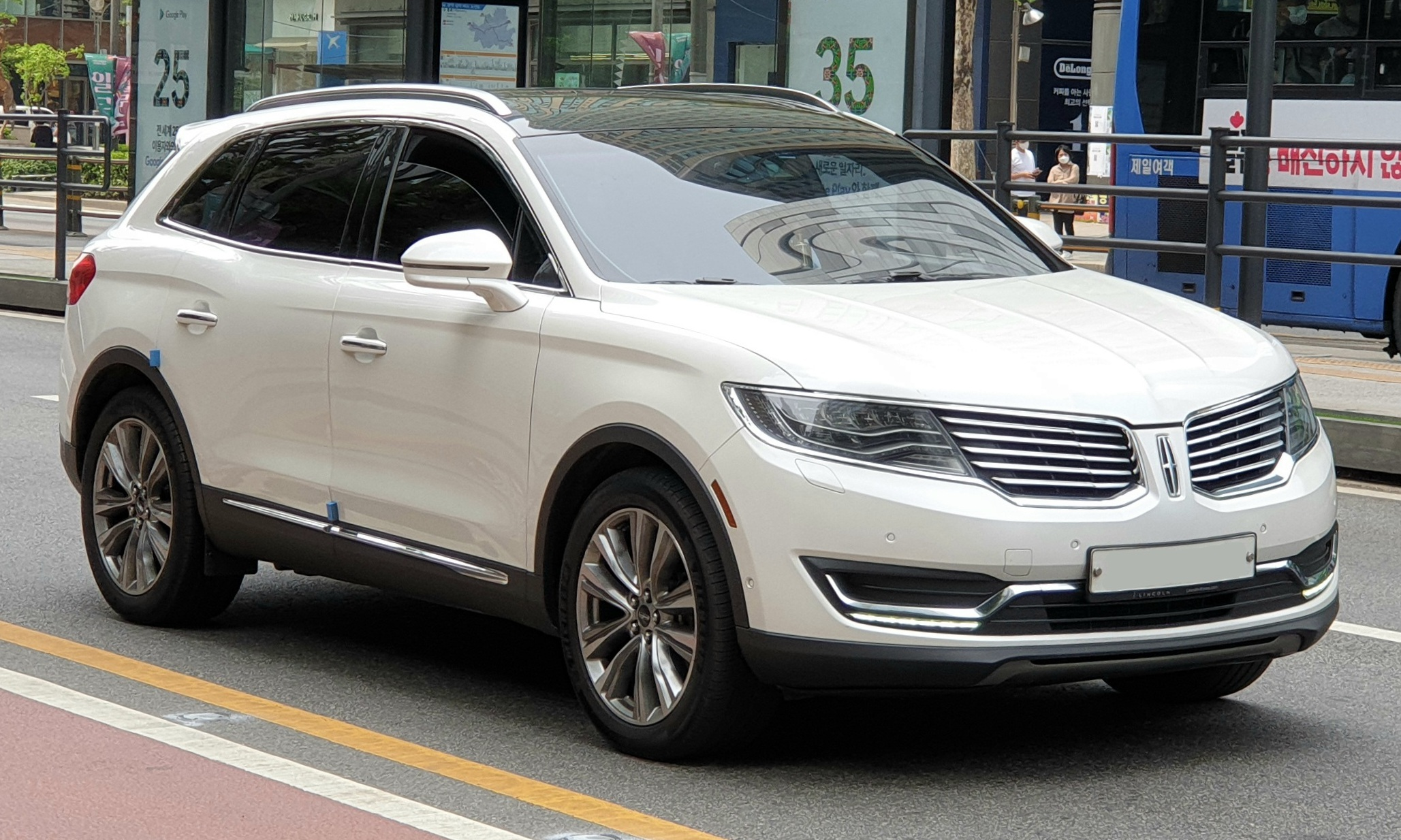
Lincoln MKX

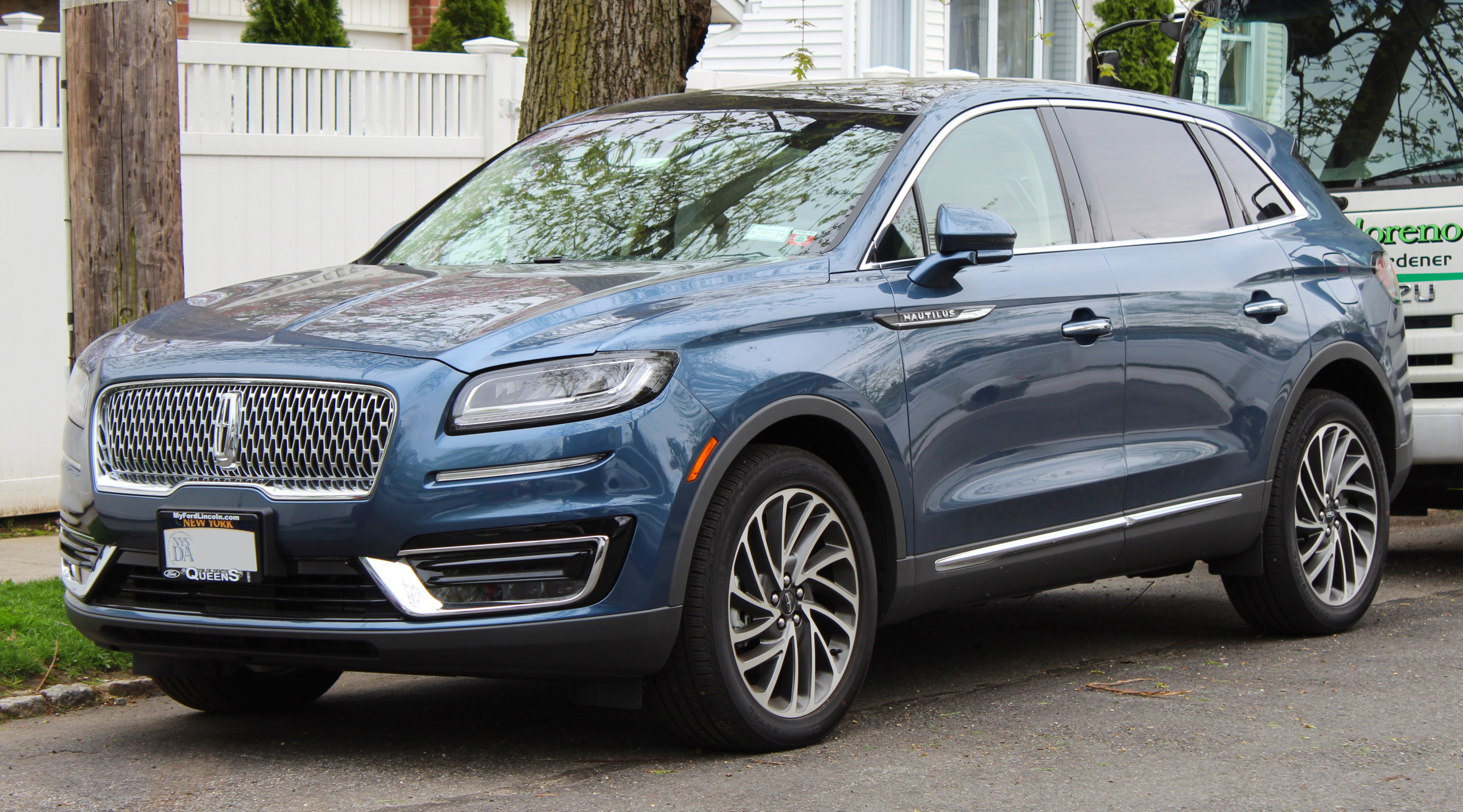
Lincoln Nautilus

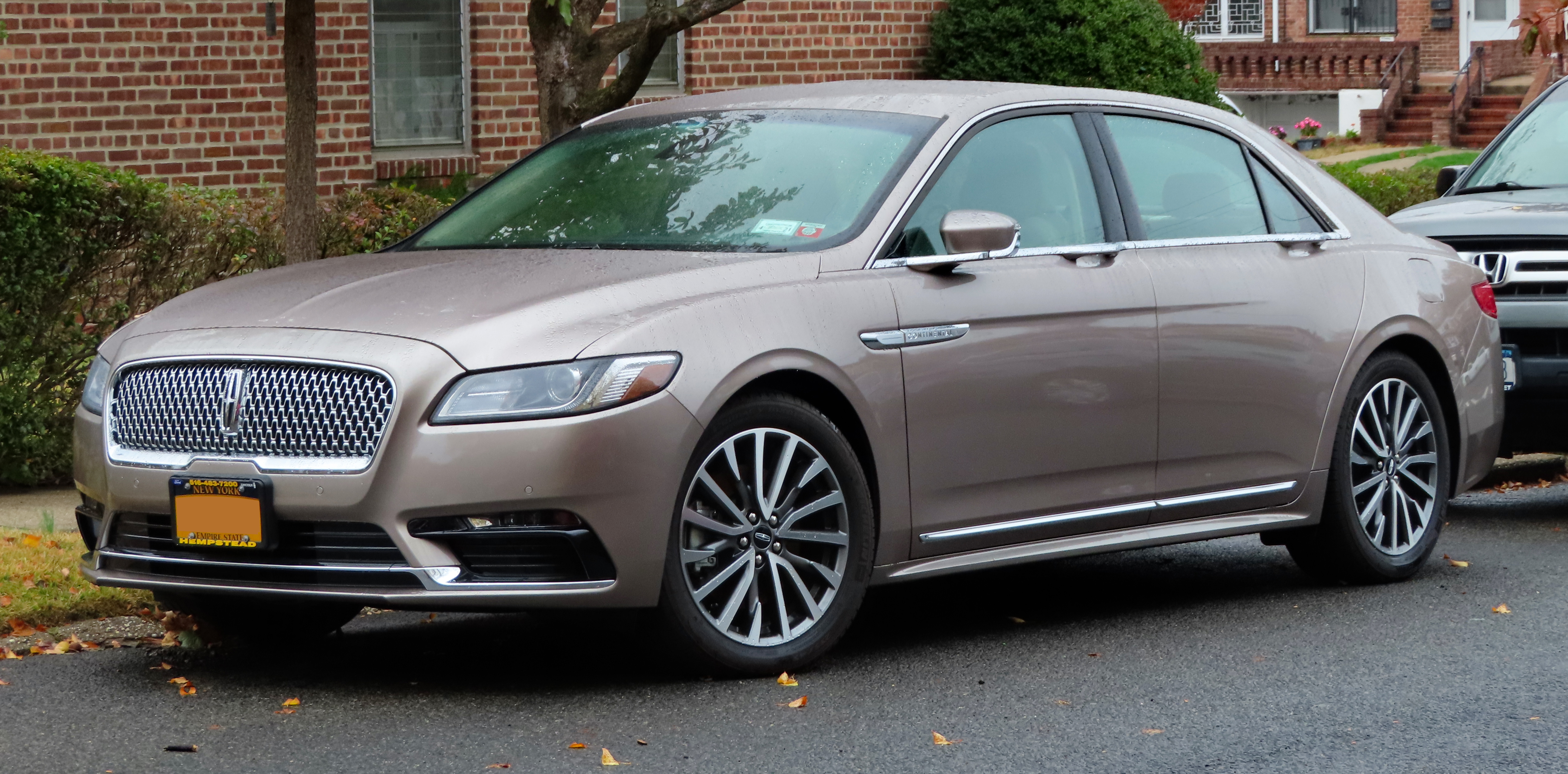
Lincoln Continental
