= Ford EUCD platform =

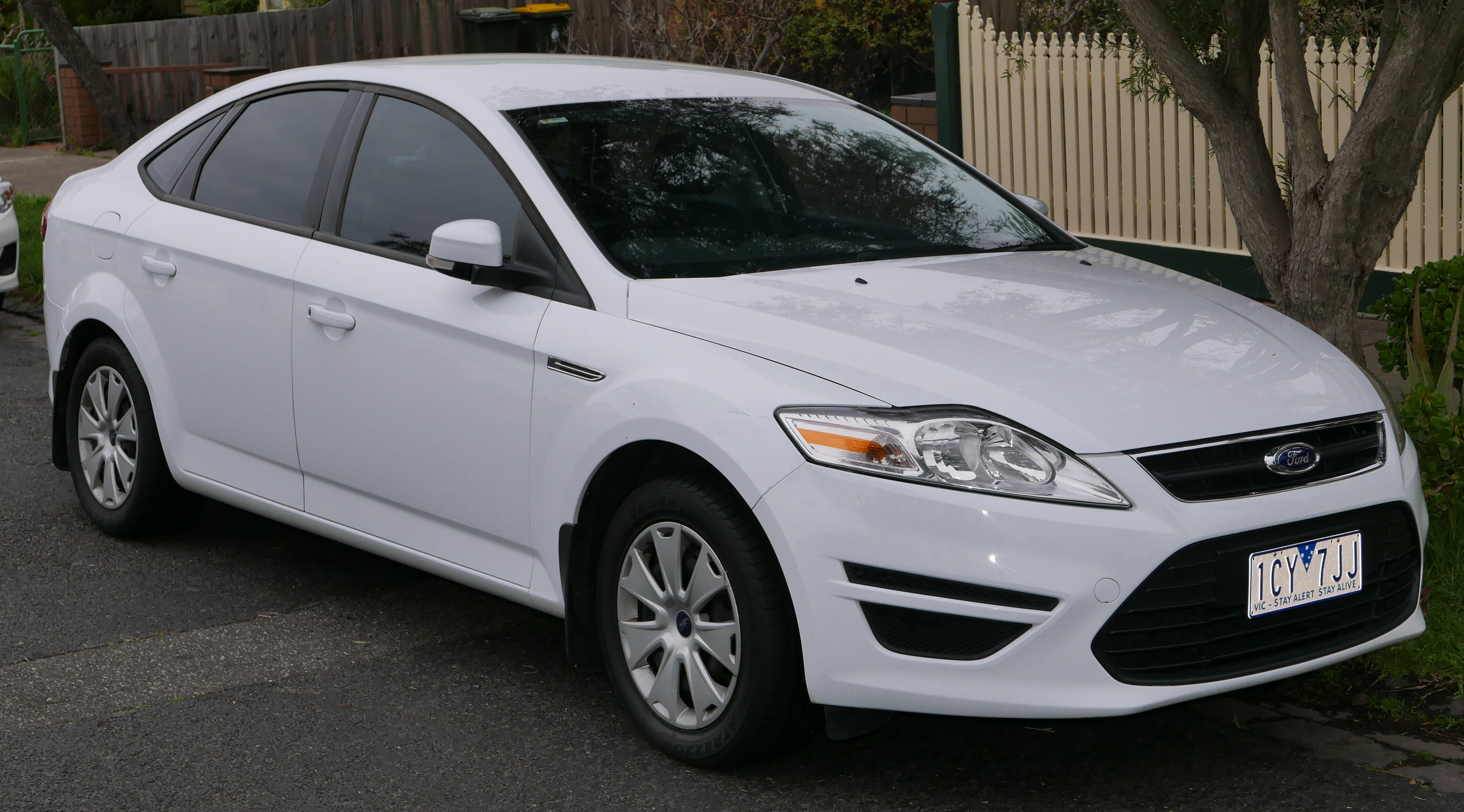

Overview
- Manufacturer: Ford Motor Company; Land Rover; Volvo Cars
- Also called: Volvo P3 platform
- Production: 2006–2018
- Assembly: Ford Motor Company: Belgium: Genk; Volvo Cars: Sweden: Torslanda; Belgium: Gent; Land Rover: United Kingdom: Halewood

Body and chassis
- Class: Mid-size car
- Layout: Transverse front engine; front-wheel drive or four-wheel drive
- Related: Ford C1 platform Ford CD4 platform

Powertrain
- Engines: I4; I5; I6; V8
- Transmissions: 5-speed manual; 6-speed manual; 6-speed automatic; 8-speed automatic; 9-speed automatic

Chronology
- Predecessor: Ford: Ford CD132 platform; Volvo: Volvo P2 platform
- Successor: Ford: Ford CD4 platform; Jaguar Land Rover: JLR D8; Volvo: Volvo SPA platform

The Ford EUCD platform (for "European Class D") is Ford's global midsize car automobile platform launched in 2006.

EUCD was chosen by Ford's European operations instead of the Ford CD3 platform due to the large number of components shared with the smaller C1. Another factor was reportedly the inability of the CD3 to accept Volvo's straight-5 engines.

The first EUCD cars were introduced at the 2006 Geneva Motor Show: Volvo's S80 (Volvo P3 platform) and Ford's S-MAX and Galaxy share about half of their total parts; for example, the steering columns on the Galaxy, S-Max and S80 share 80 percent of their parts.

The Jaguar Land Rover D8 platform is a heavily modified derivative of the EUCD.

== Vehicles ==
EUCD platform vehicles
Vehicle Name	Image	Production	Bodystyle(s)	Model Code	Notes
Ford
Ford S-MAX		2007–2016	5-door MPV	CD340	
Ford Galaxy		2007–2016	5-door MPV	CD340	
Ford Mondeo		2007–2014	4-door saloon; 5-door fastback; 5-door estate	CD345	
Land Rover
Land Rover Freelander 2; Land Rover LR2		2007–2014	5-door SUV	L359	
Volvo
Volvo S80		2006–2016	4-door saloon	Y286; 124	facelift model shown
Volvo S80L		2010–2016	4-door saloon	Y483	China-only
Volvo V70		2007–2016	5-door estate	Y285; 135	facelift model shown
Volvo XC70		2007–2016	5-door estate	Y381; 136	
Volvo XC60		2008–2017	5-door SUV	Y413; (K413); 156	facelift model shown
Volvo S60		2010–2018	4-door saloon	Y283; 134	facelift model shown
Volvo S60L		2014–2018	4-door saloon	L421; 138	
Volvo S60 Cross Country		2015–2018	4-door saloon	V429; 137	
Volvo V60		2010–2018	5-door estate	Y352; 155	facelift model shown
Volvo V60 Cross Country		2015–2018	5-door estate	V423; 157	
Volvo XC90		cancelled	5-door SUV	Y305	project was cancelled; during development

After separation from Ford, Jaguar Land Rover (JLR) continued to develop the EUCD platform; deriving the heavily modified LR-MS/JLR D8 platforms from it. Variations of the D8 are used for the 2011 Range Rover Evoque, the 2015 Land Rover Discovery Sport and the 2017 Jaguar E-Pace.

== Ford's new global CD-segment platform ==
For the 2013MY, the Fusion mid-size (C/D) car migrated to the Ford CD4 platform, a new common global platform. Its European counterpart, the Mondeo, made the transition to CD4 when the fifth generation hit the market for the 2015MY.
