= Ford Flex =

Full-size crossover SUV by Ford, 2009–2019

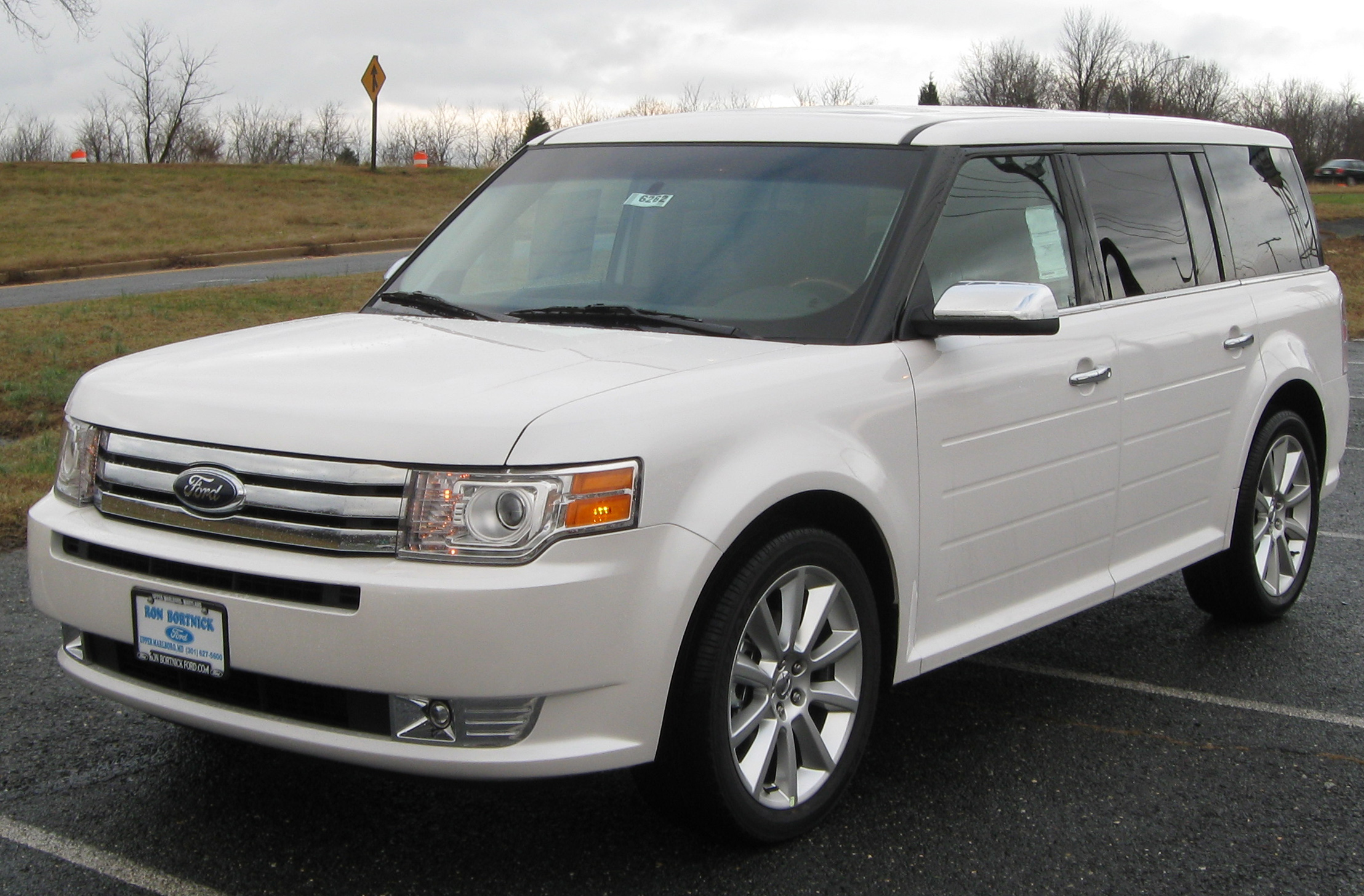
- 2010 Ford Flex Limited

Overview
- Manufacturer: Ford Motor Company
- Production: June 3, 2008–2019
- Model years: 2009–2019
- Assembly: Canada: Oakville, Ontario (Oakville Assembly)
- Designer: Peter Horbury

Body and chassis
- Class: Full-size crossover SUV
- Body style: 4-door SUV
- Layout: FF layout / AWD layout
- Platform: Ford D4 platform
- Related: Ford Explorer (2011-2019); Ford Taurus (sixth generation); Ford Taurus (fifth generation); Lincoln MKS; Lincoln MKT

Powertrain
- Engine: 3.5 L Duratec V6; 3.5 L EcoBoost V6
- Transmission: 6-speed 6F50 automatic 6-speed 6F55 automatic

Dimensions
- Wheelbase: 117.9 in (2,995 mm)
- Length: 201.8 in (5,126 mm)
- Width: 75.9 in (1,928 mm)
- Height: 68 in (1,727 mm)
- Curb weight: 4468 lb. (FWD); 4640 lb. (AWD)

Chronology
- Predecessor: Ford Taurus X/Ford Freestyle; Ford Freestar

The Ford Flex is a full-size crossover SUV manufactured and marketed by Ford over a single generation for the 2009–2019 model years, having entered production in 2008. It is the successor to the Ford Taurus X.

The Flex was introduced in 2005 as a concept vehicle based on the Ford D4 chassis architecture, a variant of the Ford D3 platform shared with the 2011-2019 Explorer and the Lincoln MKT; the latter a rebadged variant of the Flex.

From June 2008 until its discontinuation in 2019, the Ford Flex was manufactured by Ford Canada at Oakville Assembly (Oakville, Ontario); the Flex and the Lincoln MKT were produced alongside the Ford Edge and Lincoln MKX (today, Lincoln Nautilus). The Flex was marketed in the United States, Canada, Mexico, and the Middle East — with production reaching just over 300,000.

== Background ==
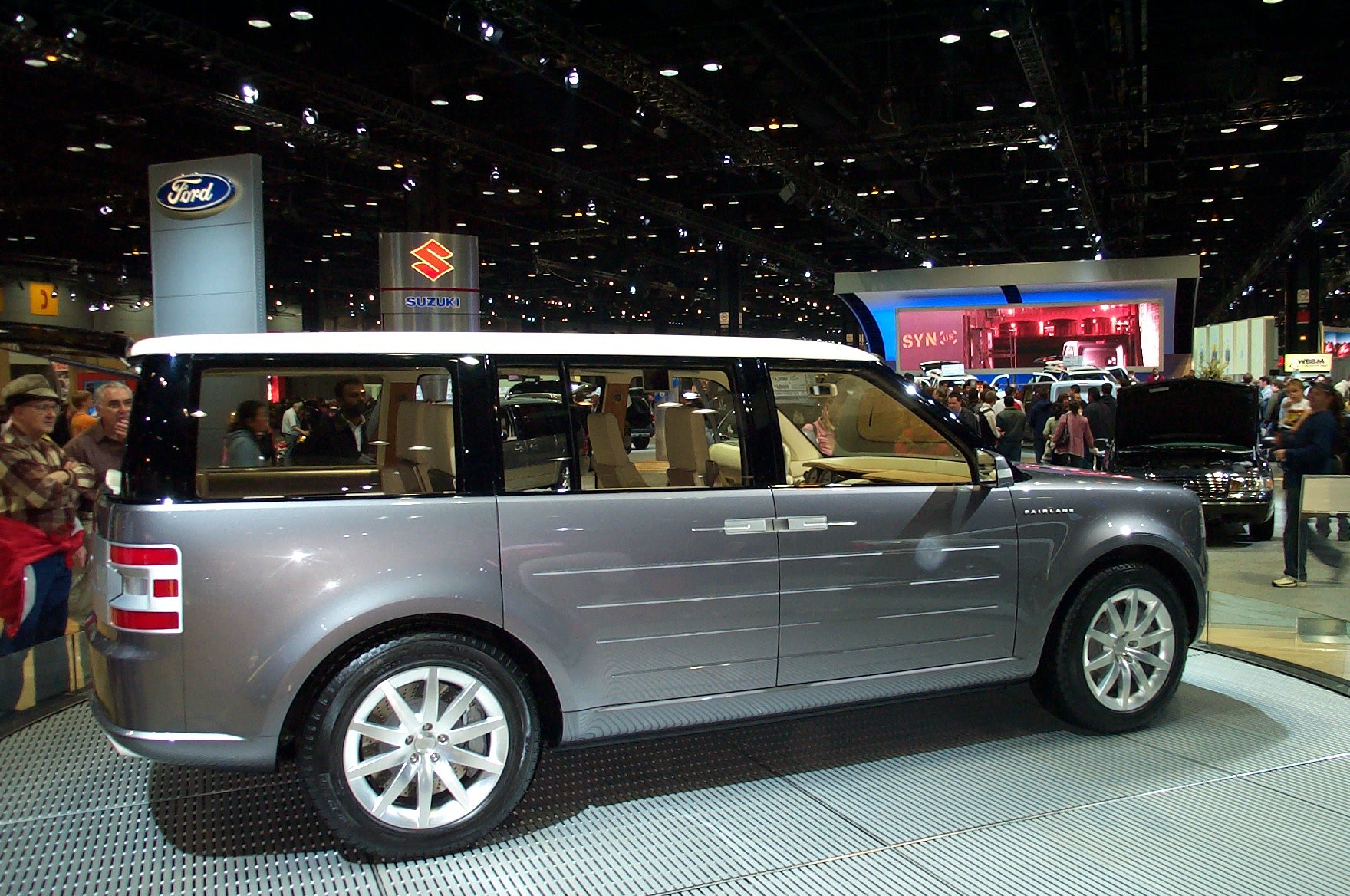
2005 Ford Fairlane concept at the 2005 Chicago Auto Show

At the 2005 Chicago Auto Show, Ford unveiled the Ford Fairlane concept vehicle. Derived from the mid-size Ford CD3 platform (to be used by the 2006 Ford Fusion sedan), the vehicle was a 3-row MPV with several distinctive styling elements. The rear passenger doors of the Fairlane were rear-hinged; this configuration was chosen to provide better interior views when on display. When the doors were closed, the configuration appeared similar to a production minivan.

The concept vehicle was approved for 2009 production as the Ford Flex. Along with the name change, several extensive changes were made from the Fairlane concept, while the styling was largely left intact. The vehicle was increased in size, shifting from the CD3 chassis to the full-size D4 platform. While replacing the Freestar minivan, the design abandoned sliding doors for front-hinged doors, in line with a station wagon.

Styled by former Volvo designer Peter Horbury, the Flex featured horizontal grooves in the doors and tailgate, evoking the design of classic Woodies. Car Design News said the styling referenced "a previous era without resorting to obvious retro styling cues."

== Design overview ==
The Ford Flex was based on the Ford D4 chassis architecture, a version of the D3 platform re-engineered for use for multiple wheelbases. The model line was offered with front-wheel drive as standard, with all-wheel drive as an option. The Flex was designed with an independent rear suspension system and a traction control system called AdvanceTrac.

=== Powertrain ===
The Ford Flex was powered by two different 3.5 L V6 engines, both paired to a 6-speed automatic transmission. The standard engine was a naturally-aspirated Duratec V6; initially producing 262 hp (195 kW), the engine was increased in output to 287 hp (214 kW) for 2013.

Optional on all-wheel drive vehicles, Ford offered a twin-turbocharged EcoBoost V6 producing 355 hp (265 kW), increased to 365 hp (272 kW) for 2013.

When properly equipped, the Ford Flex had a towing capacity of 4,500 lb (2,040 kg). The all-wheel drive system was capable of transferring up to 100% of torque to the front or rear axle as needed.

== Model history ==
=== 2009–2012 ===
At its 2009 launch, trim levels included the SE base model, mid-level SEL, and top-trim Limited — in six- or seven-passenger seating configurations, the latter having a second row bench seat. Ford offered four alternatives for the roof paint: silver, black, white/cream, and body-color.

In 2010, a second engine was available, as a 355 hp twin-turbocharged EcoBoost V6 became available on SEL and Limited models with all-wheel drive standard. On US models, reverse cameras were restricted to Limited-trim models.

For 2012, an automatic parking system was added as option for upper-trim models.

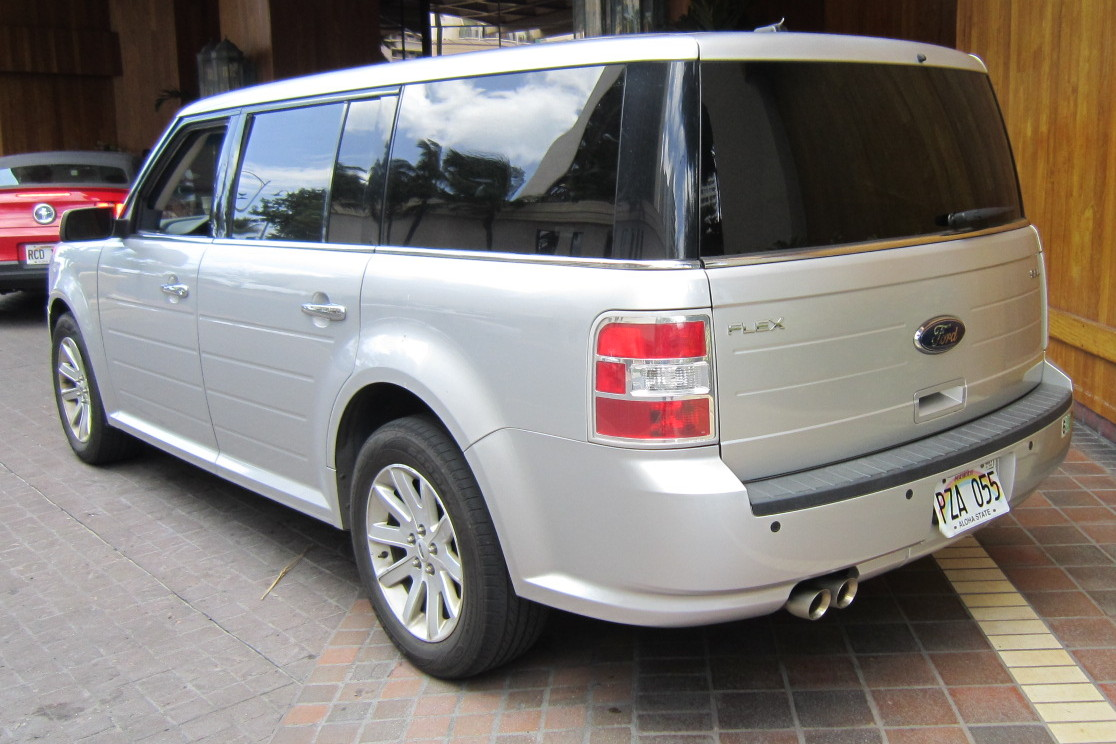
2009–2012 Ford Flex rear

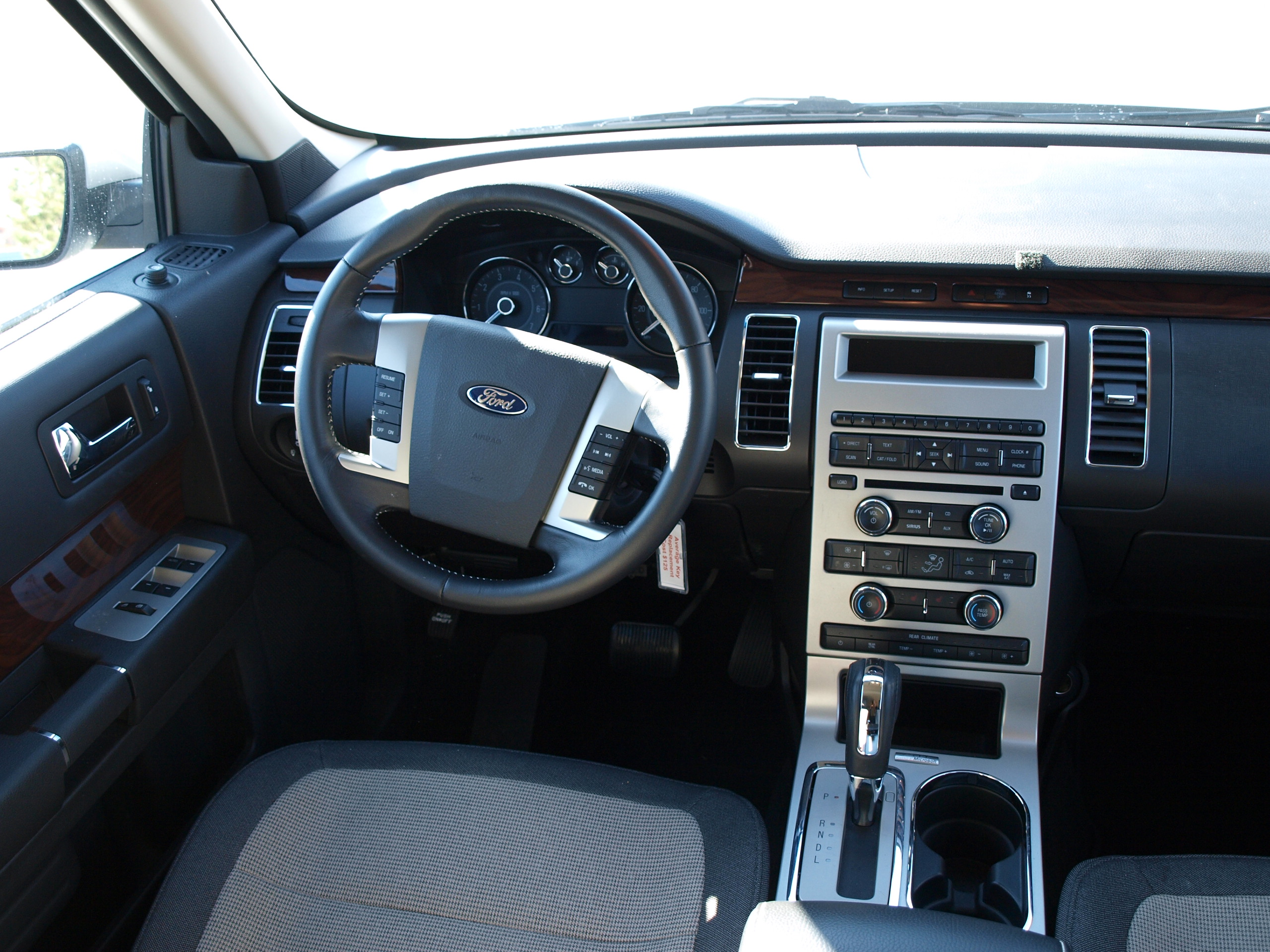
2009–2012 Ford Flex dashboard

=== 2013–2019 ===
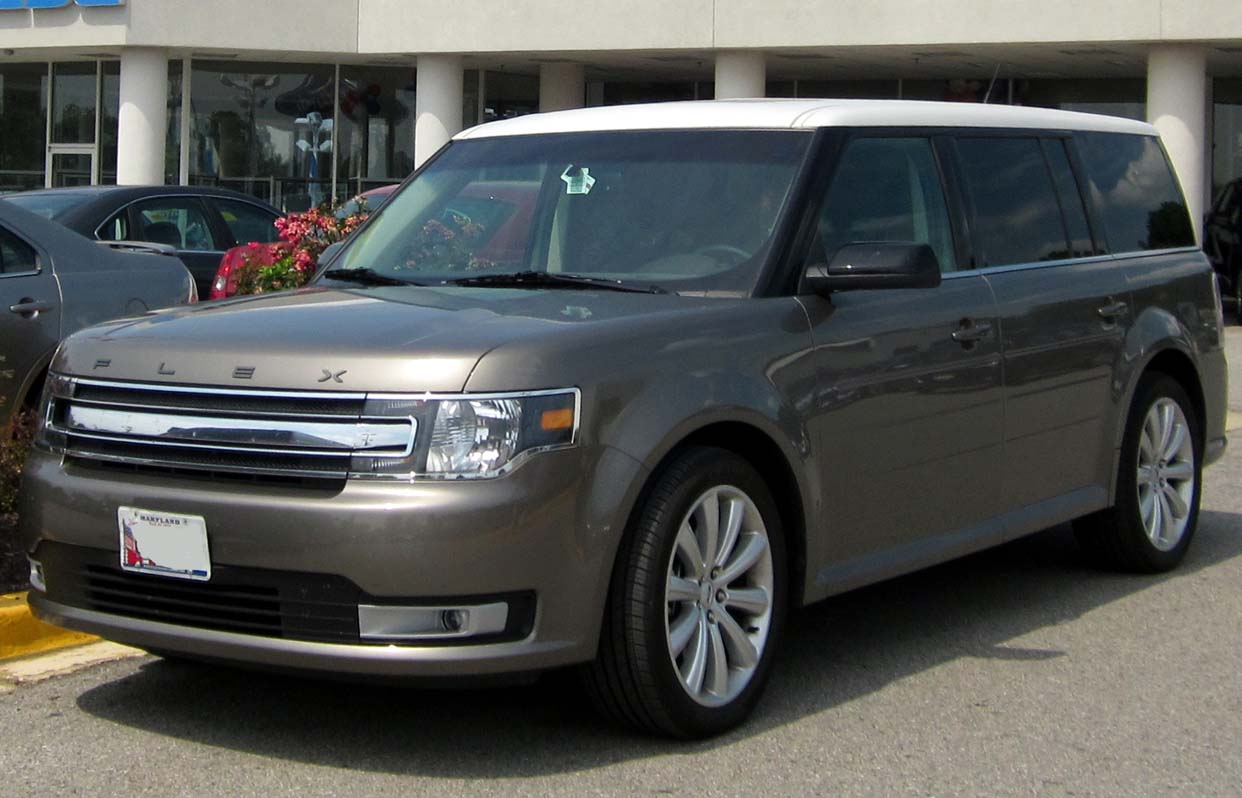
Ford Flex Facelift

Introduced at the 2011 LA Auto Show, the MY 2013 Flex received a mid-cycle facelift, where the roofline and doors were retained and the front and rear were revised. The model name was spelled out on the hood above the revised grille, without a Ford emblem on the car's face. On the tailgate, the Ford emblem was decreased in size and moved to the bottom right corner. Inside, the dashboard was updated, with a new 3-spoke steering wheel. Starting in 2013, the previous up/down gear selection buttons on the main gear selector were updated with steering wheel mounted paddle shifters.

The 2019 model year Flex only had minor changes, and was the final year for the vehicle.

== Trim levels ==
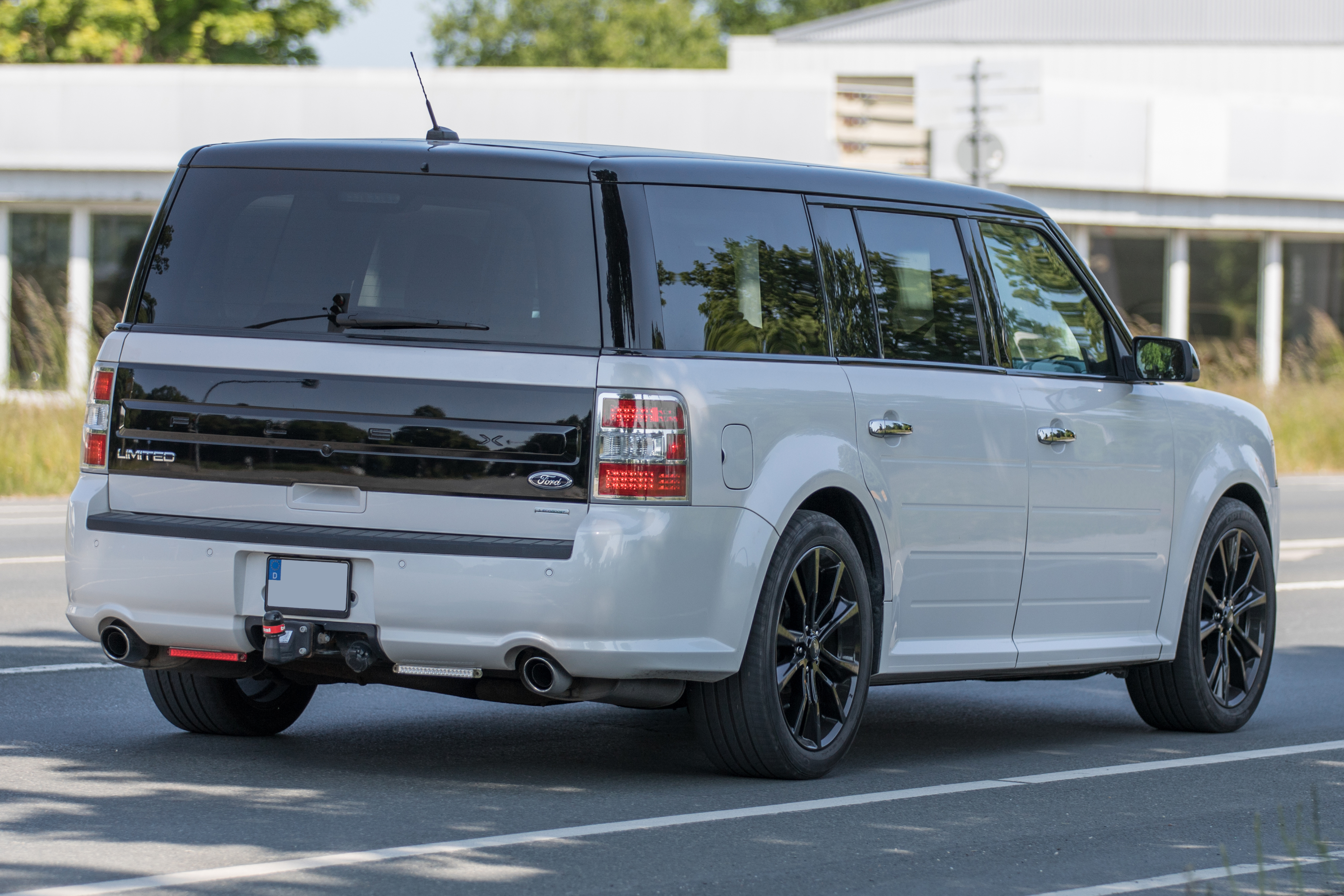
Ford Flex Limited

Across its production, the Flex was offered in three trim levels:

The base SE, only available with front-wheel-drive (FWD), offers the following features as standard equipment: a 3.5 L "DuraTec" V6 engine, a six-speed automatic transmission, seventeen-inch aluminum wheels, an AM/FM stereo with a single-disc CD/MP3 player and an auxiliary audio input jack (later, Ford SYNC also became standard equipment on this trim level), a six-speaker audio system, cloth seating surfaces, aluminum interior trim panels, keyless entry, power windows, power door locks, black side mirrors and door handles, and manually controlled two-row air conditioning.

The mid-level SEL, available with either FWD OR all-wheel-drive (AWD), all-wheel drive equipped SELs had the EcoBoost V6 as an option (only for the 2010 model year), added eighteen-inch wheels, Ford SYNC, an AM/FM stereo with satellite radio, a six-disc, in-dash CD/MP3 changer and an auxiliary audio input jack (later, MyFord Touch or SYNC 3 became standard equipment on this trim level), a seven-speaker premium audio system with external amplifier and rear-mounted subwoofer, a power front driver's seat, a security system, color-keyed door handles, and automatically controlled two-row air conditioning.

The top-of-the-line Limited, available with either FWD OR AWD, added nineteen-inch chrome-plated wheels, a GPS navigational system (later with MyFord Touch or SYNC 3), leather-trimmed seating surfaces, dual power front seats, heated and ventilated dual front seats, a driver's memory system, push-button ignition and remote start with keyless access (on later models ONLY), a dual-panel panoramic moonroof, a Sony audio system, rear-mounted subwoofer, and external surround-sound amplifier, and chrome-plated side mirrors (in 2013 it was changed to body color mirror caps) and door handles.

On 2011 and 2012 models, an additional Titanium trim level was available, which was the Limited with blacked out headlights, tail lights, rear appliqué, 3 bar grille without the Ford logo, blacked out beltline trim, foglamp bezels, and mirror caps. It had different interior trim, upholstery and was only available in Black, White, Red and Silver.

A Sport Appearance Package was available on the SEL and Limited, which featured gloss black side mirrors, door handles, and fascia inserts, twenty-inch wheels, a two-tone black-and-gray leather-trimmed interior, and aluminum interior trim panels.

== Marketing ==
As part of the "electrifying the night" campaign, Ford partnered with Esquire magazine with a cover using E Ink.

== Sales in the United States ==
| Year | Sales |
|---|---|
| 2008 | 14,457 |
| 2009 | 38,717 |
| 2010 | 34,227 |
| 2011 | 27,428 |
| 2012 | 28,224 |
| 2013 | 25,953 |
| 2014 | 23,822 |
| 2015 | 19,570 |
| 2016 | 22,668 |
| 2017 | 22,389 |
| 2018 | 20,308 |
| 2019 | 24,484 |
| 2020 | 4,848 |
| Total | 307,145 |

== Reception ==
In 2010, the Flex was listed as the third-best affordable mid- or full-sized SUV in US News, behind the Buick Enclave and Chevrolet Traverse. The Flex Ecoboost is also the first ranked large affordable SUV according to Consumer Reports. It is also ranked the most reliable large sized SUV and Ford's most reliable vehicle as ranked by Consumer Reports. Ford Flex AWD was ranked highest of large SUVs by the percentage of owners who would definitely purchase that same vehicle again.

The Flex reached less than half its annual sales target of 100,000. vehicles that Ford had expected to sell each year, with sales of 38,717 in 2009.
