= Ford CD3 platform =

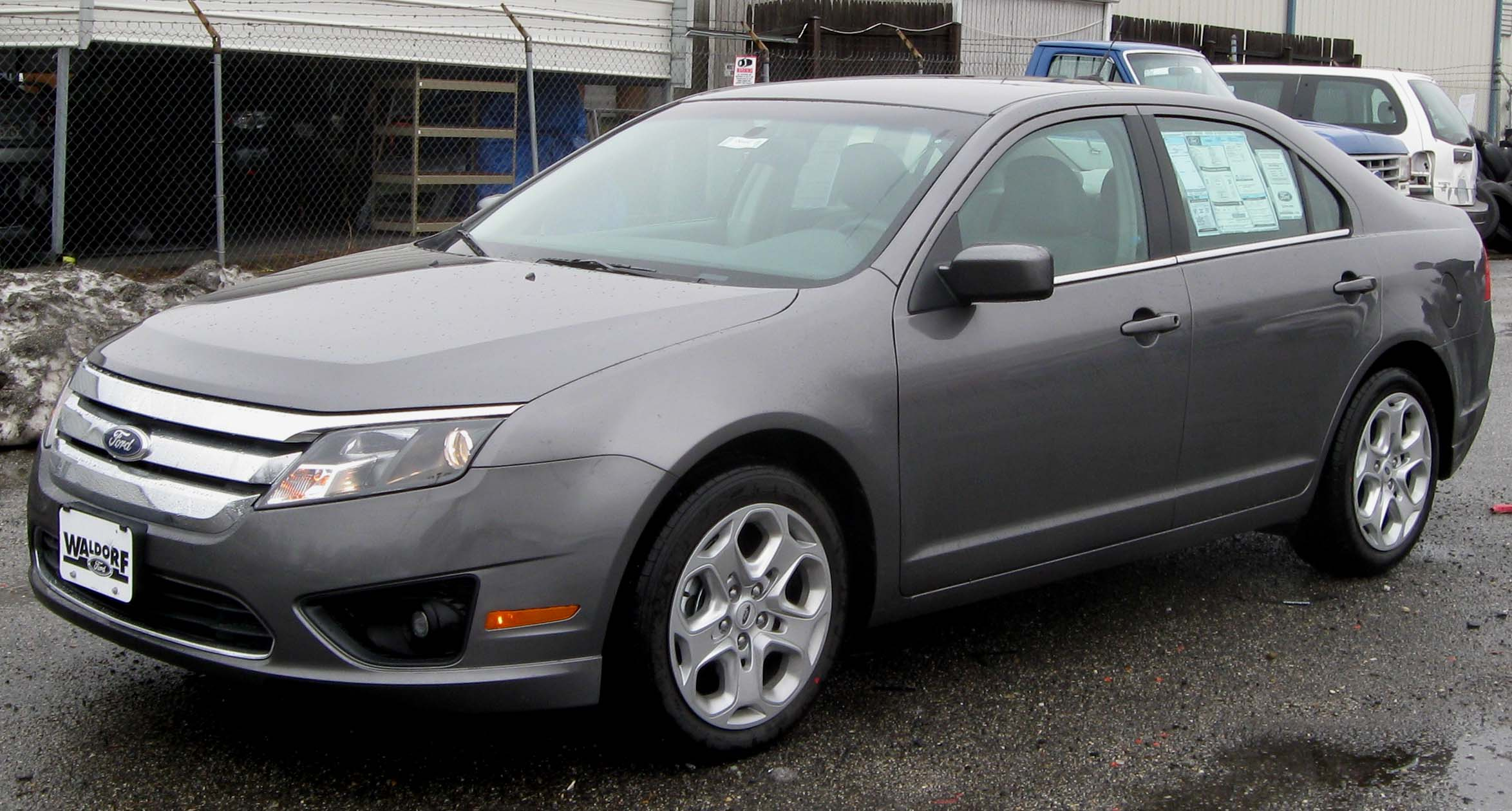
- 2010 Ford Fusion SE

Overview
- Manufacturer: Mazda
- Production: 2002–2019

Body and chassis
- Class: Mid-size (C/D) platform

Chronology
- Predecessor: Ford CD2 platform
- Successor: Ford CD4 platform

The Ford CD3 platform (for "C/D-class") is a Ford midsize car automobile platform, originally designed by Mazda, which was partially owned by Ford. The platform is designed for either front, all-wheel drive or Ford's hybrid powertrain.

The platform is based on a unitized welded steel body (monocoque) with an independent short long arms (SLA) double wishbone front suspension with stabilizer bar and an independent multi-link twist blade rear suspension with stabilizer bar.

Ford Motor Company uses the CD3 platform design from the Mazda partnership as its first fully "digital" car, allowing the company to cut months of development time, saving money and bringing the vehicles to market more quickly. Engineers were able to virtually build an entire car prior to initiating construction, thereby improving vehicle fit and finish, tool clearances and production line ergonomics.

Vehicles using this platform include:

- 2002–2008 Mazda 6 (GG)
- 2006–2019 Besturn B70
- 2006–2012 Ford Fusion (CD338)
- 2006–2012 Lincoln Zephyr/MKZ (CD378)
- 2006–2011 Mercury Milan (CD338)
- 2007–2015 Mazda CX-9
- 2007–2014 Ford Edge crossover SUV (U387)
- 2007–2015 Lincoln MKX crossover SUV (U388)
- 2008–2012 Mazda 6 (GH) (Note: modified platform)
- 2009–2019 Besturn B50
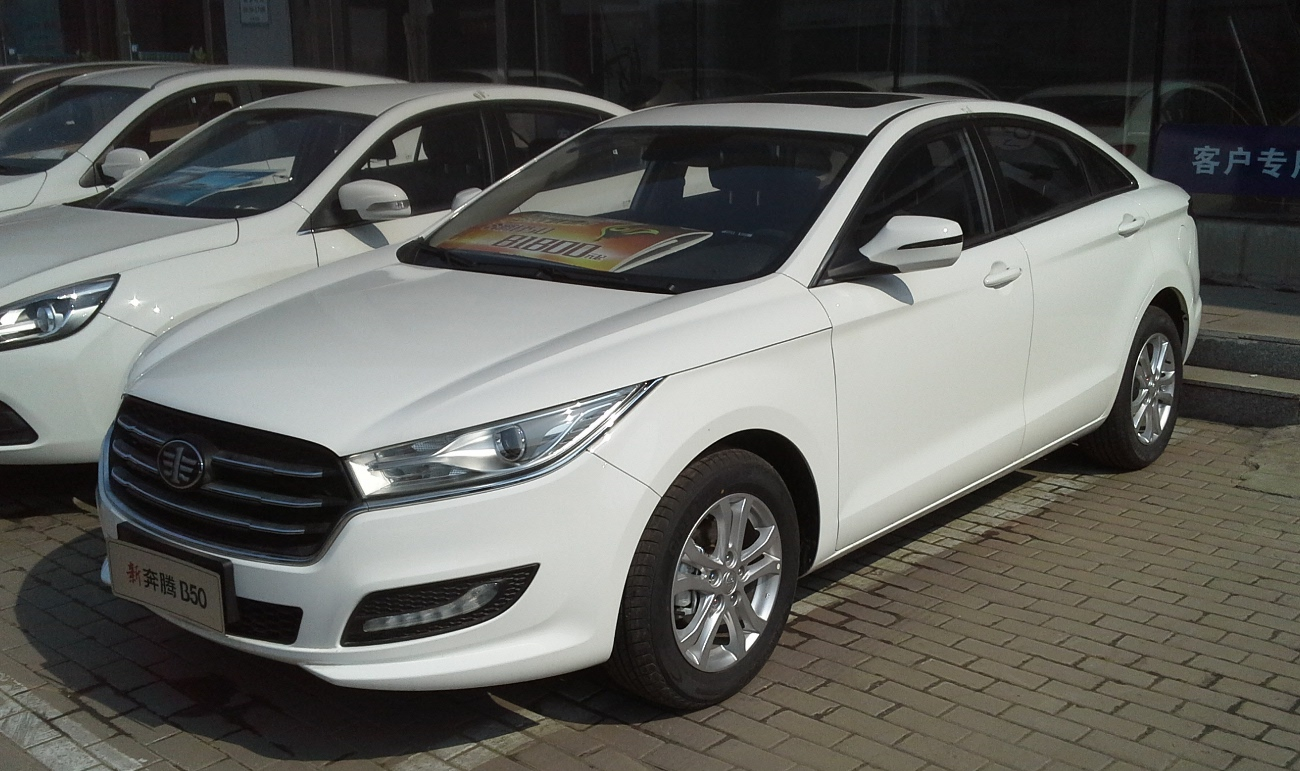
Besturn B50

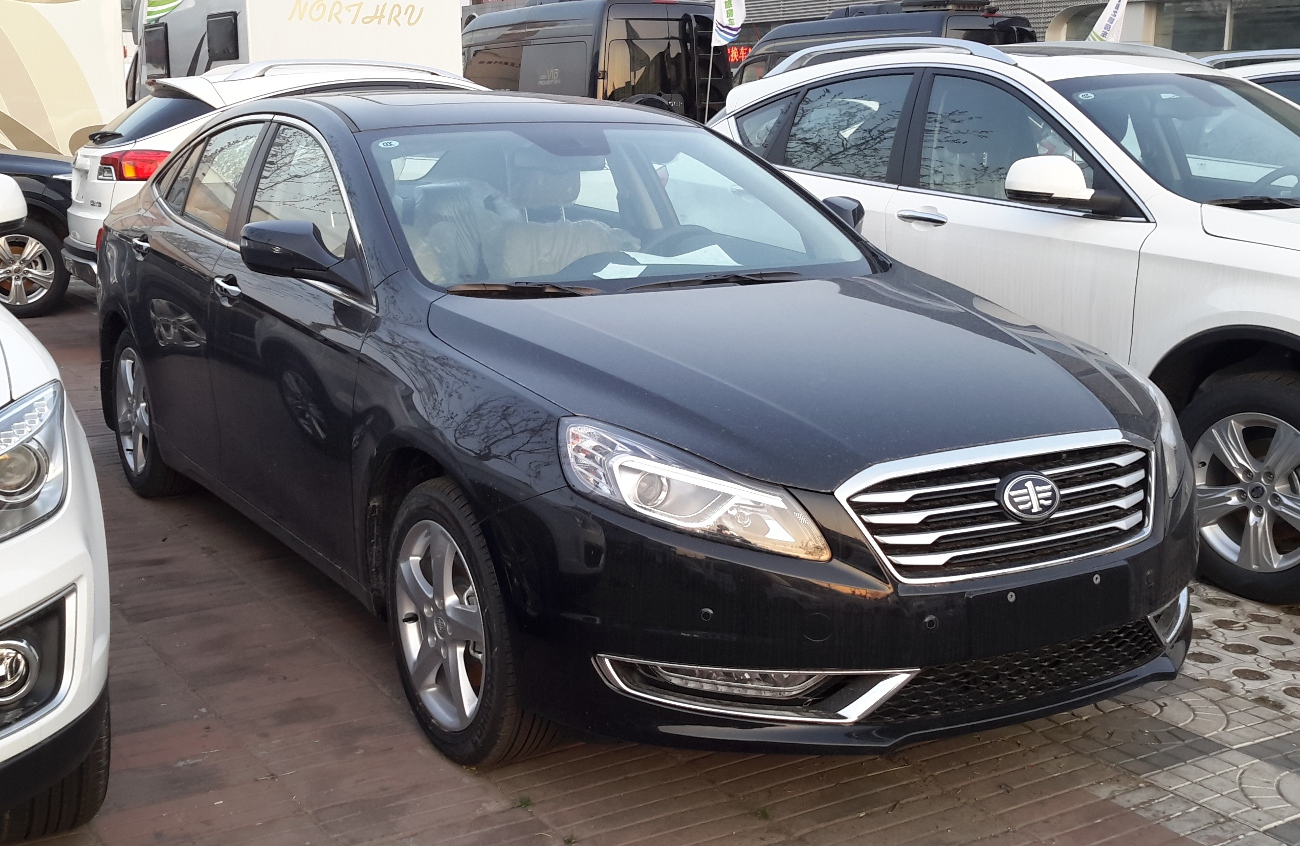
Besturn B70

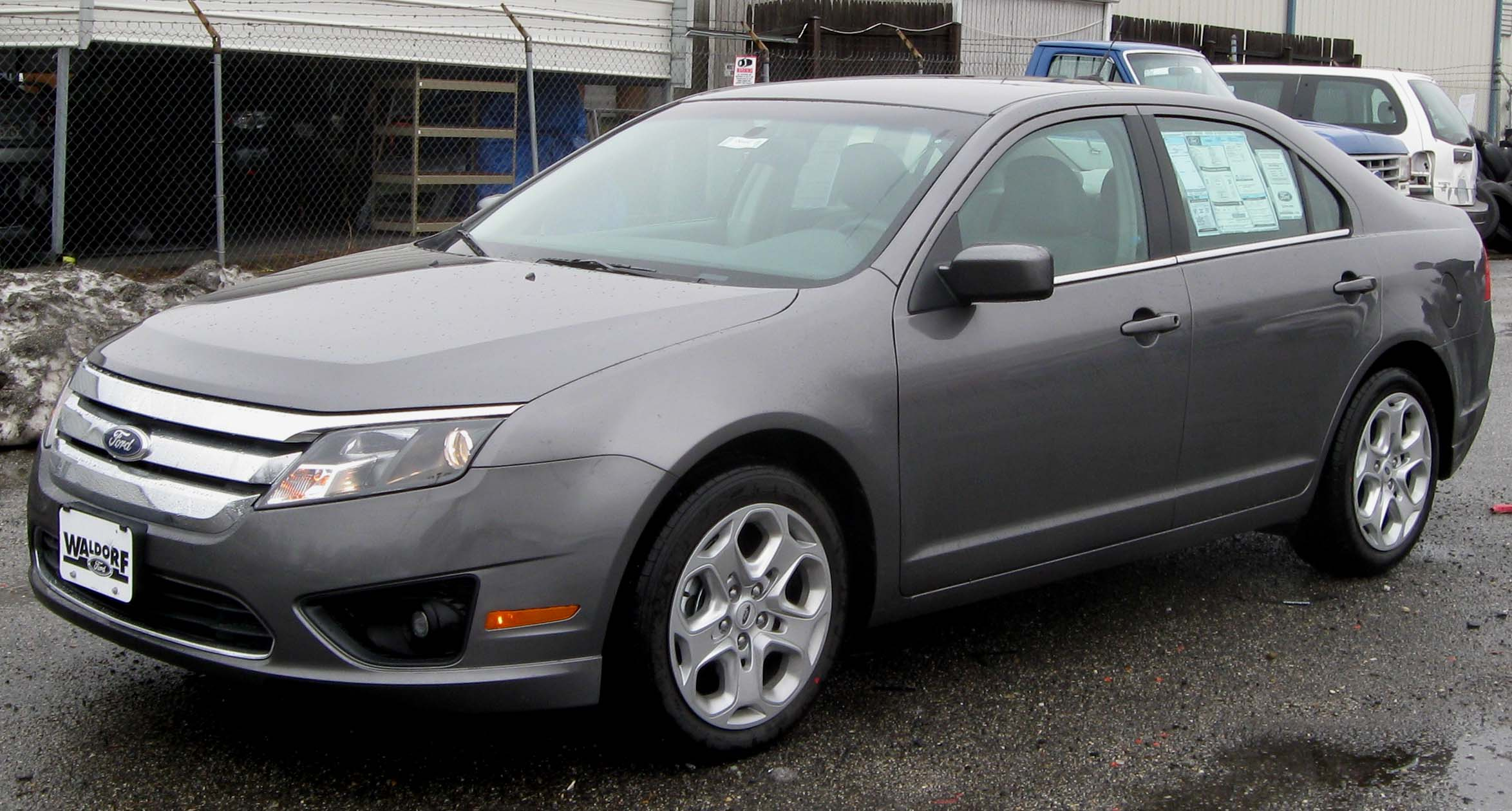
Ford Fusion

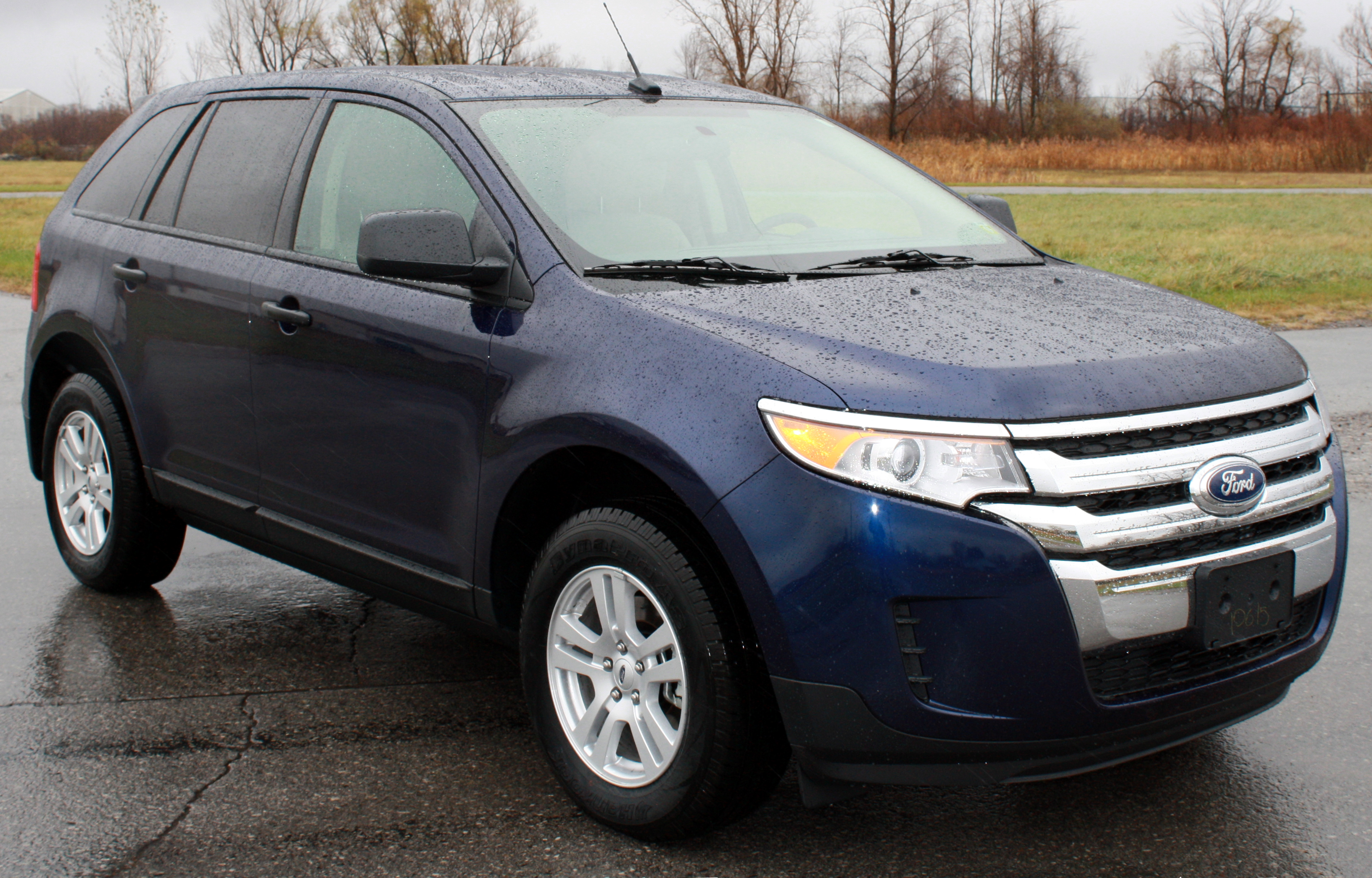
Ford Edge

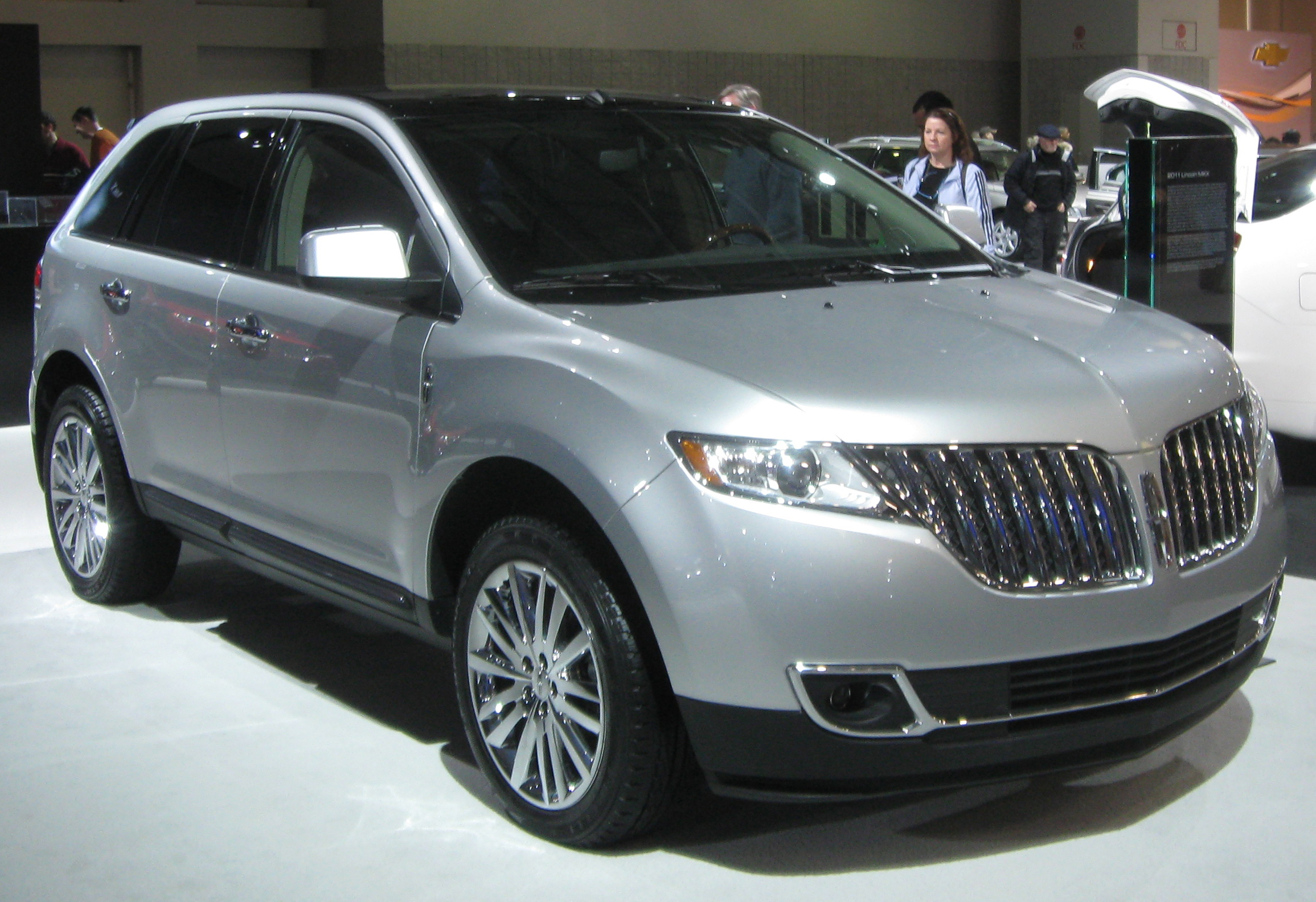
Lincoln MKX

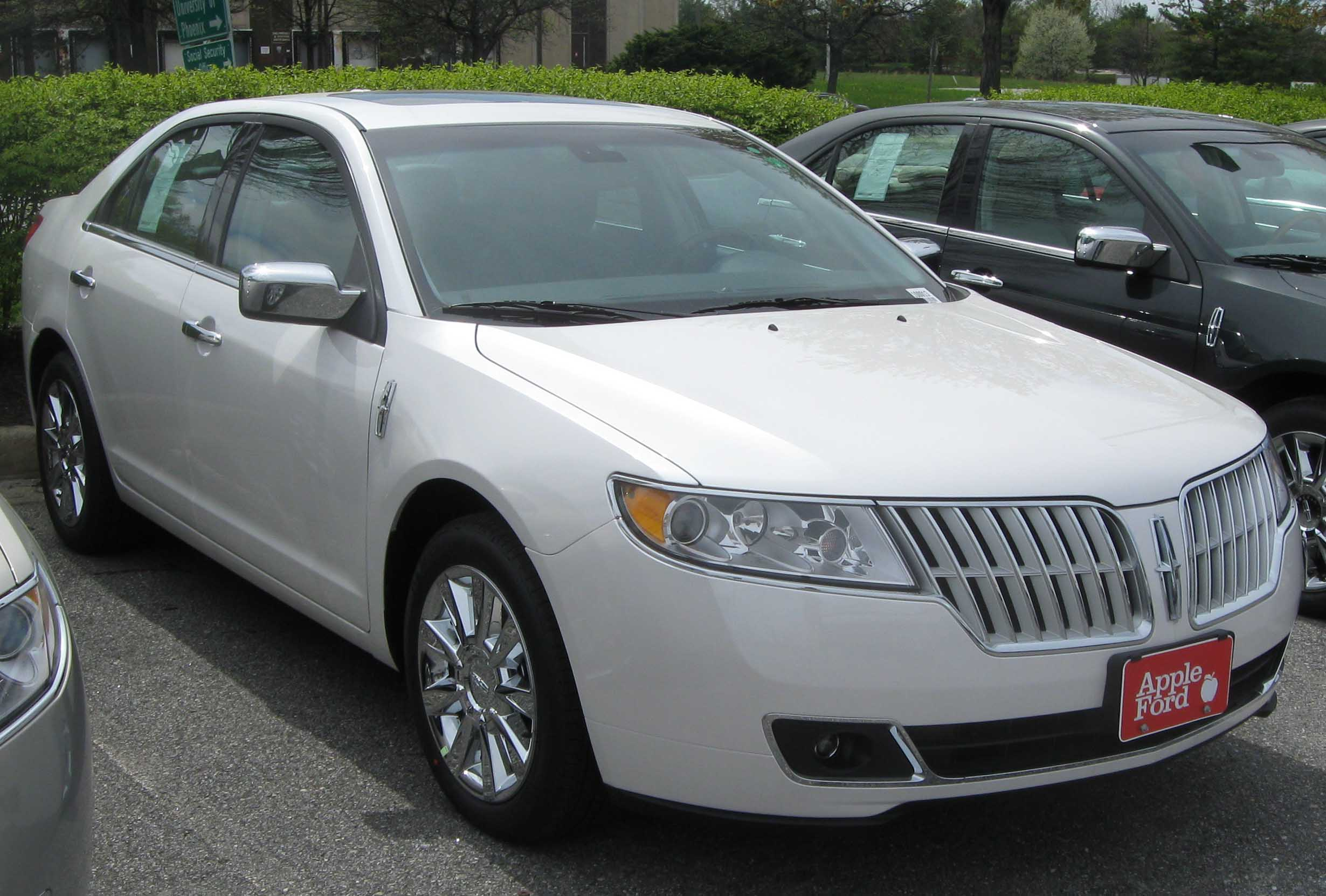
Lincoln Zephyr/MKZ

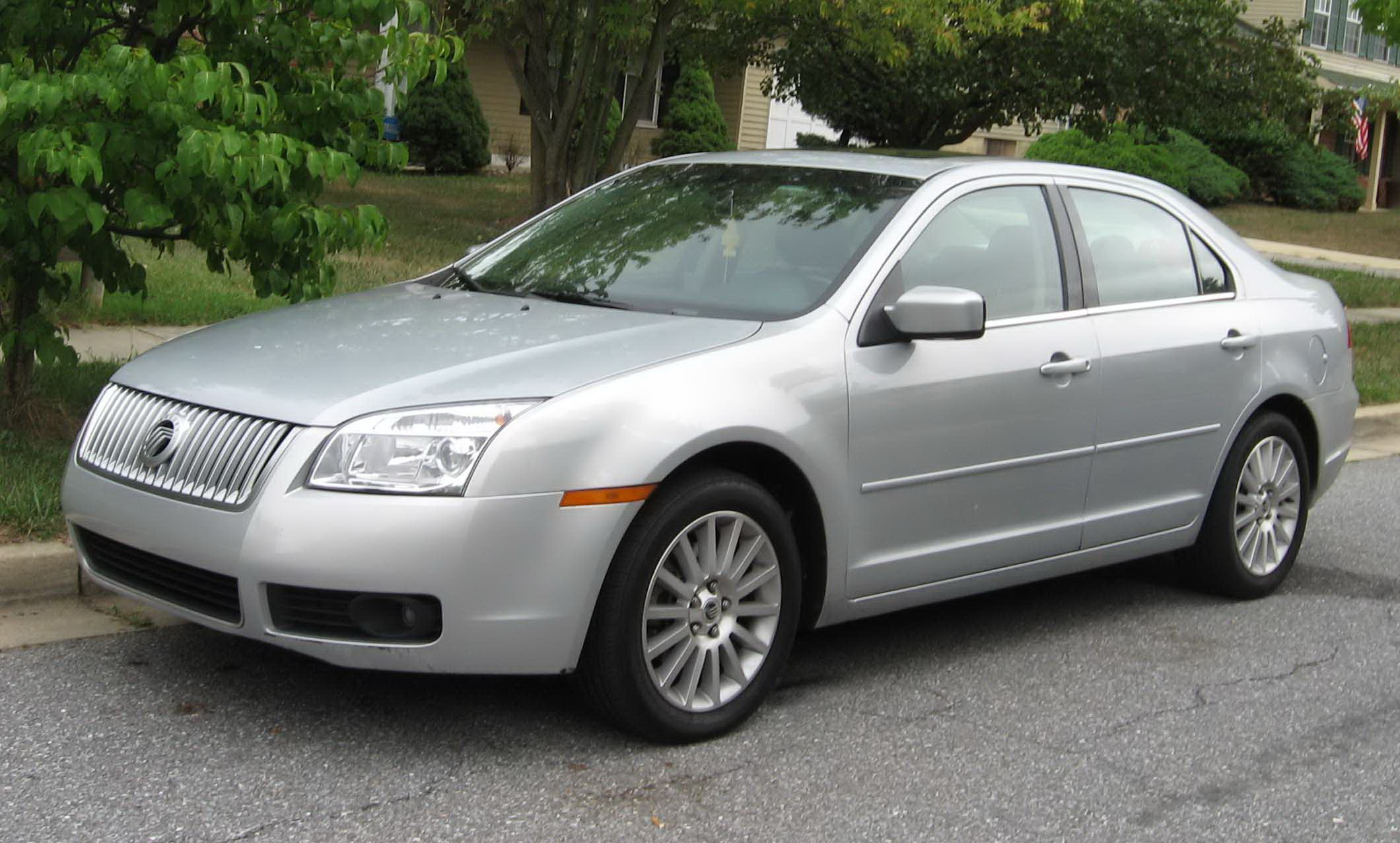
Mercury Milan

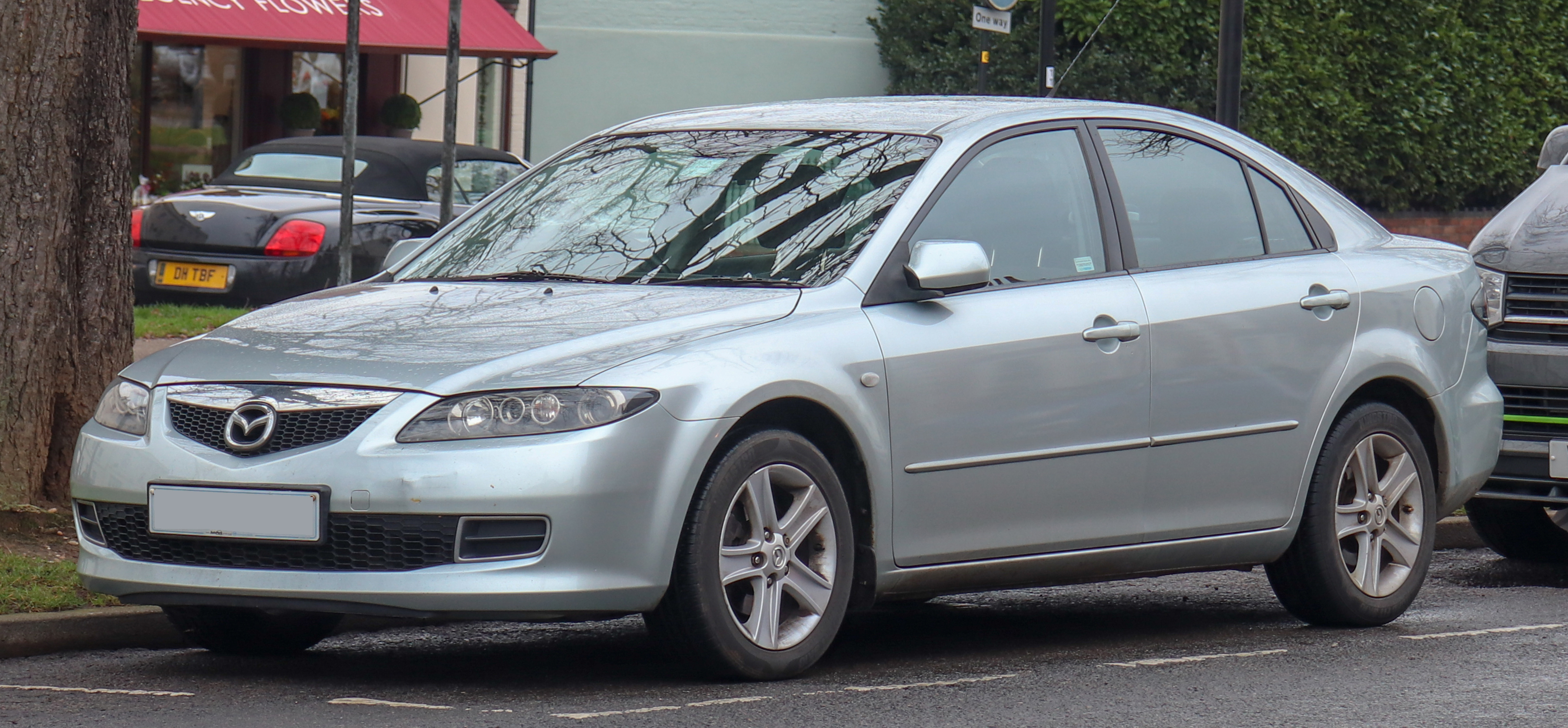
Mazda 6 (GG)

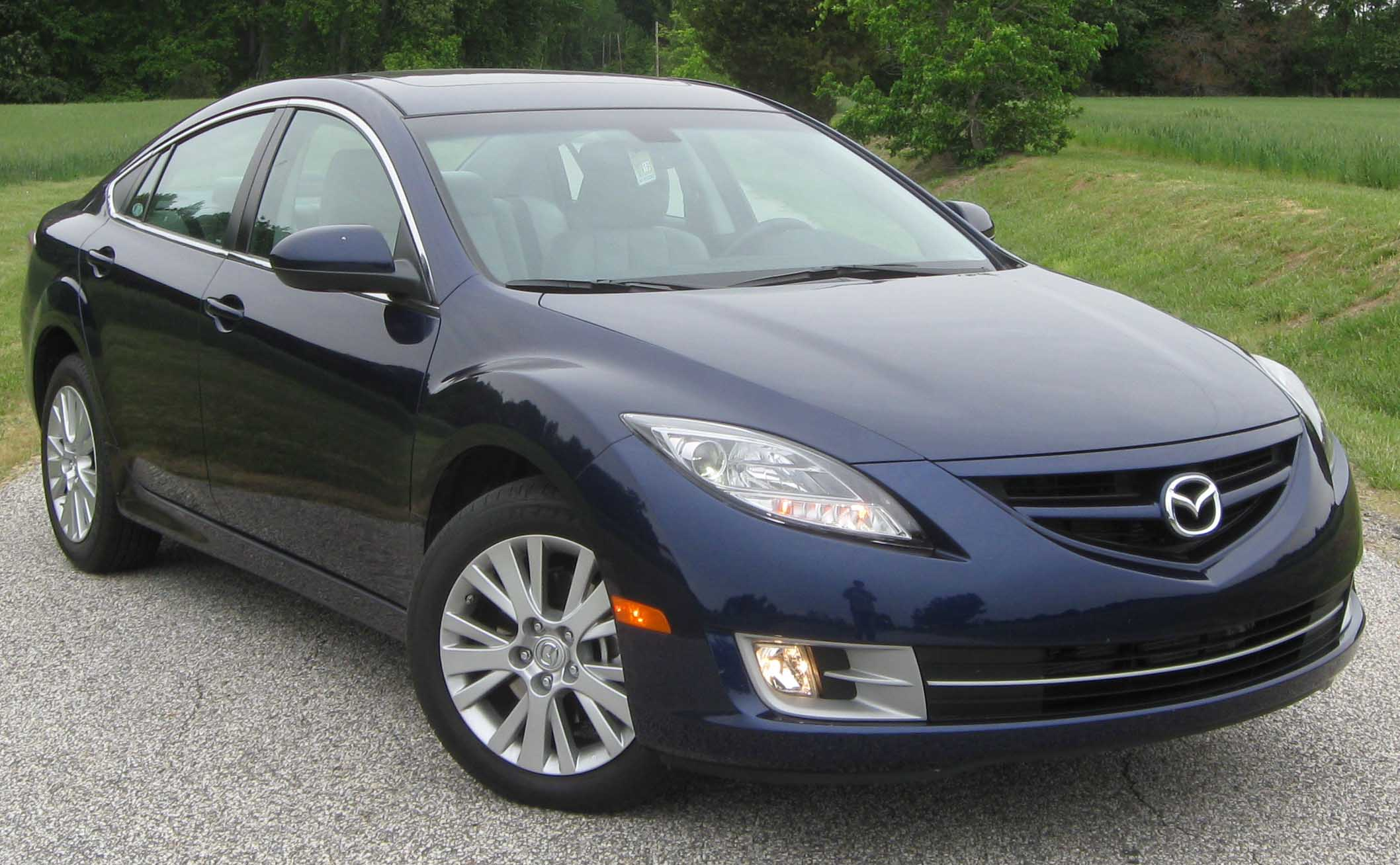
Mazda 6 (GH)

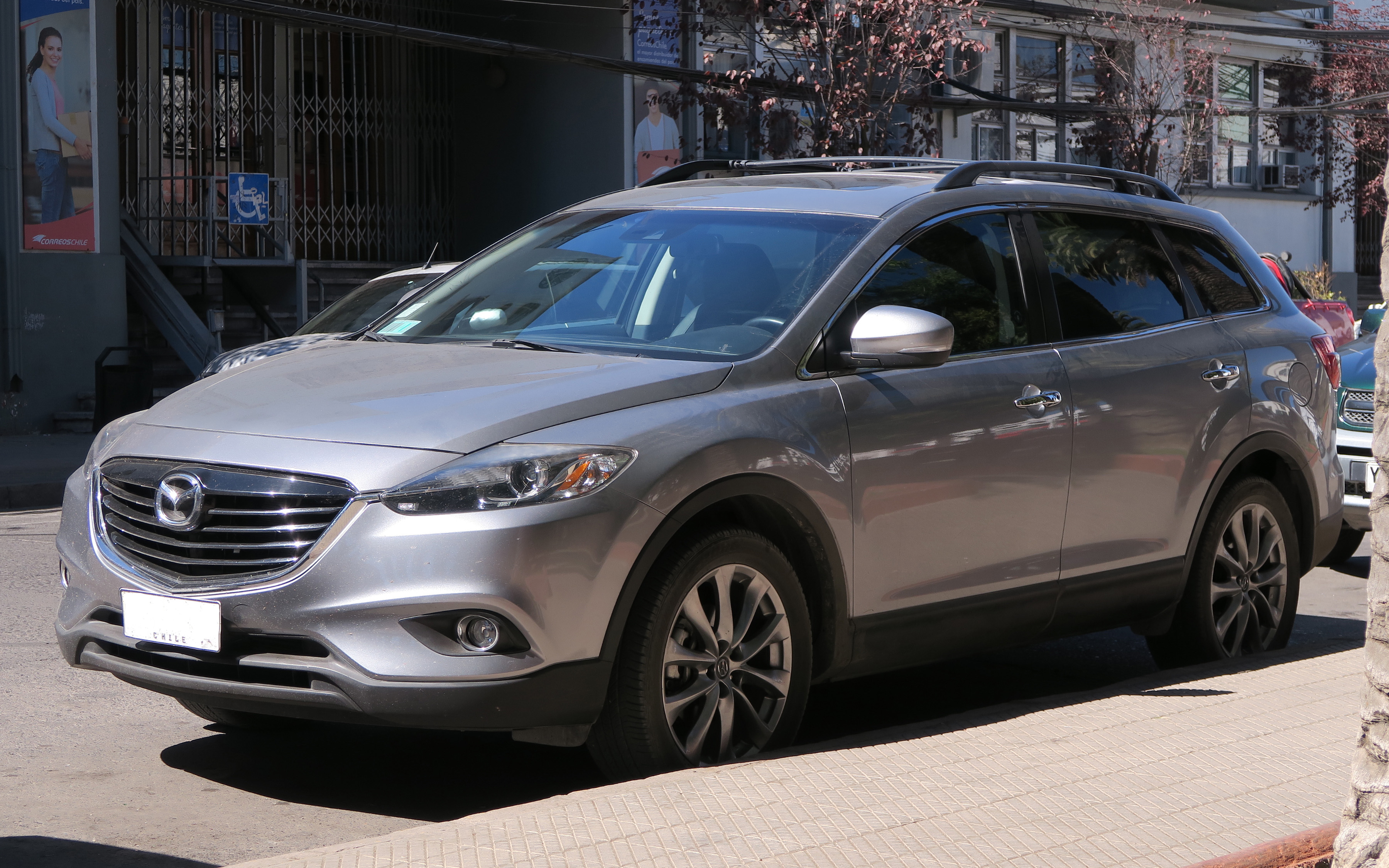
Mazda CX-9

Cancelled CD3 products:

- 2009 Ford Flex crossover SUV (switched to D4)

== See also ==
- Ford D3 platform
