= Lincoln MKT =

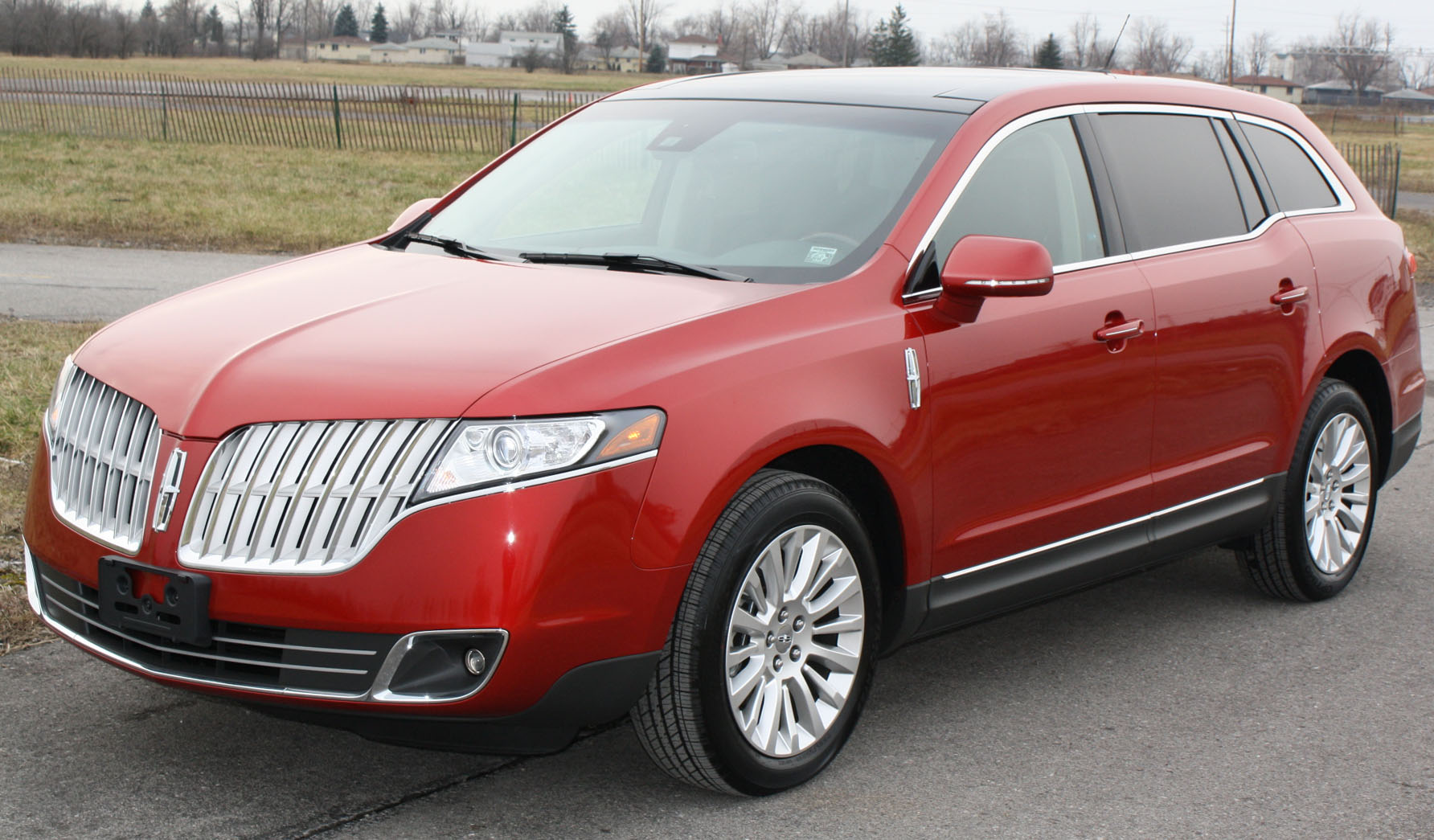
- 2010-2012 Lincoln MKT

Overview
- Manufacturer: Lincoln (Ford)
- Also called: Lincoln MKT Town Car (fleet only)
- Production: July 6, 2009–October 2019
- Model years: 2010–2019
- Assembly: Oakville, Ontario, Canada (Oakville Assembly)
- Designer: Andrea di Buduo, John Caswell

Body and chassis
- Class: Full-size luxury crossover SUV
- Body style: 5-door SUV
- Layout: FF layout All-wheel drive
- Platform: Ford D4 platform
- Related: Ford Explorer (2011–2019); Ford Flex; Ford Taurus (2010–2019); Lincoln MKS

Powertrain
- Engine: 2.0 L EcoBoost I4 (Town Car fleet); 3.7 L Ti-VCT V6; 3.5 L EcoBoost/Twin-turbo GTDI V6
- Transmission: Ford 6F 6-speed automatic

Dimensions
- Wheelbase: 120.7 in (3,066 mm)
- Length: 2010–12: 208.4 in (5,293 mm); 2013–: 207.6 in (5,273 mm)
- Width: 78.7 in (1,999 mm); 2013–: 76.0 in (1,930 mm)
- Height: 63.9 in (1,623 mm); 2013–: 67.4 in (1,712 mm)

Chronology
- Predecessor: Lincoln Aviator (first generation); Lincoln Town Car (livery/limousine version)
- Successor: Lincoln Aviator (2020) (mid-size); Lincoln Continental (Livery)

The Lincoln MKT is a full-size luxury crossover SUV with 3-row seating marketed by the Lincoln division of Ford Motor Company over a single generation from 2010-2019. Marketed between the Lincoln MKX (renamed the Lincoln Nautilus) and the Lincoln Navigator, the MKT shared its Ford D4 chassis with the Ford Flex CUV and the 2011-2019 Ford Explorer.

After the 2019 model year, Ford stopped using its D3/D4 chassis, discontinuing the MKT and counterparts. Within the Lincoln model range, the MKT was not directly replaced.

The MKT was assembled by Ford of Canada at its Oakville Assembly facility at Oakville, Ontario, Canada.

== 2008 concept ==
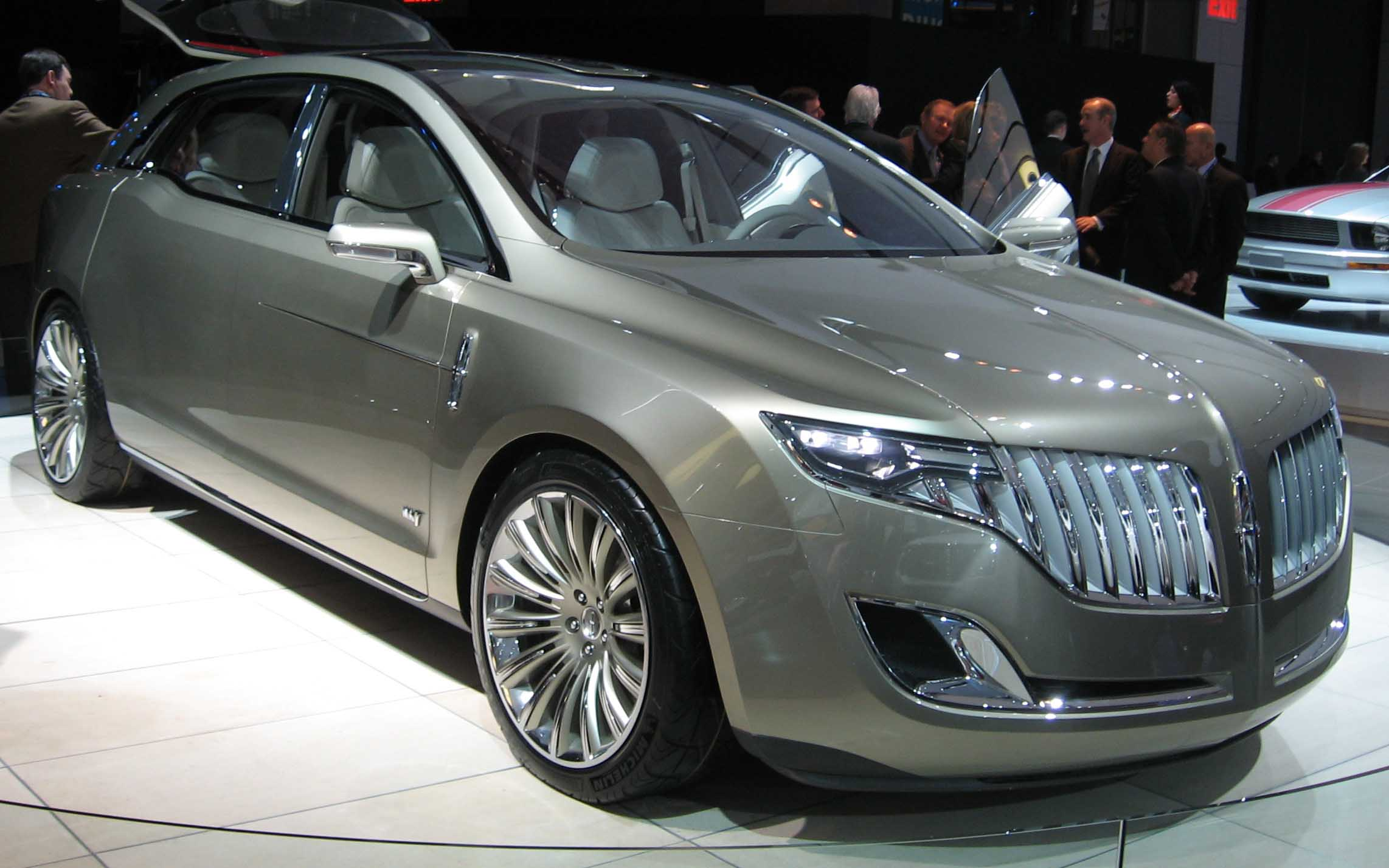
Lincoln MKT concept

The Lincoln MKT was presented as a concept vehicle at the 2008 North American International Auto Show in Detroit, MI. Largely a preview of the upcoming production vehicle, it featured a full-length glass roof and a 2+2 seating layout. The MKT concept vehicle was announced to have the 415 hp 3.5 L Cyclone 35 V-6 variant of Ford's new EcoBoost engine family, which uses turbocharging and direct injection technologies to offer the power of larger displacement engines with the fuel economy of smaller engines.

== Model overview ==
The MKT entered production at the Oakville Assembly plant in July 2009 for the 2010 model year. While the Lincoln division was shifting from SUVs towards crossover SUVs, the MKT had no direct predecessor. Developed as a competitor against the Acura MDX, Audi Q7, and Mercedes-Benz R-Class, the MKT was designed as one of the largest and fastest luxury crossovers in its price range.

=== Chassis ===
The Lincoln MKT uses Ford's D4 platform, a variant of the Volvo-derived Ford D3 platform designed for SUVs and crossovers. With a 120.7-inch wheelbase, the Lincoln MKT is the longest-wheelbase D4 vehicle and the third-longest wheelbase Lincoln currently produced (only the Navigator/Navigator L are longer). While sharing no common body panels, the Lincoln MKT is mechanically related to the Ford Flex and the fifth-generation Ford Explorer (though the Explorer remains marketed as an SUV and retains a greater degree of off-road driving capability).

Sharing its powertrain with the Lincoln MKS and sixth-generation Ford Taurus, the standard engine for a Lincoln MKT is a 3.7L V6. From 2010 to 2012, the engine produced 268 hp; after 2013, the 3.7L V6 produced 303 hp. As an option, a 3.5L twin-turbocharged V6 is offered. Initially producing 355 hp in the MKT, in 2013, the 3.5L engine was retuned for 365 hp. Both engines are mated to a Ford 6F 6-speed automatic transmission. A front-wheel drive configuration is fitted to two-wheel drive versions, with all-wheel drive fitted as an option; the latter is standard on versions fitted with the 3.5L V6.

In 2013, a 2.0L turbocharged inline-4 became available for the Town Car livery variant as a special-order option.

The MKT features electric power steering over more-traditional hydraulic power steering. The electric steering system is combined with ultrasonic sensors to form a hands-off "Active Park Assist" system that steers the vehicle into parallel parking slots. According to Lincoln's website, the MKT was discontinued for the 2020 model year.

=== Body ===
In the shift from the 2008 concept to the production MKT, relatively few changes were made, with the most notable exception of larger rear quarter windows, the addition of wraparound headlamp units, and a revised lower grille. Retained from the concept, the vertically slatted split grille was a feature first introduced on the 2007 Lincoln MKR concept (along with the use of the Lincoln star emblem as fender side vents).

In the interest of fuel economy, Lincoln adapted several weight-saving measures in the construction of the MKT body. The liftgate is constructed using an inner panel of cast magnesium and an outer panel of stamped aluminum. Other places where magnesium replace steel include the radiator support frame and the frames of the rear seatbacks and lower seat cushions.

Although sharing no external body panels with its Ford D4 counterpart Ford Flex, the MKT and the Flex offer the same two seating configurations. A seven-passenger (2-3-2) configuration is standard, with an optional six-passenger (2-2-2) configuration; a second row of bucket seats replaces the three-passenger split bench seat with a full-length center console as an option.

During its production, the Lincoln MKT saw relatively few changes, primarily limited to adjustments in color offerings and option packages. In 2013, in line with the MKZ and MKS, the front fascia of the MKT was redesigned, with the widely slatted grille replaced by a more narrowly spaced design and a redesign of the lower grille. For 2016, a new Sync 3 infotainment system replaced the previous MyLincoln Touch. In 2017, the front fascia saw a second update, with the vertical grille layout replaced by a widely spaced horizontal design, shared with the Lincoln MKC and 2016-2018 MKX.

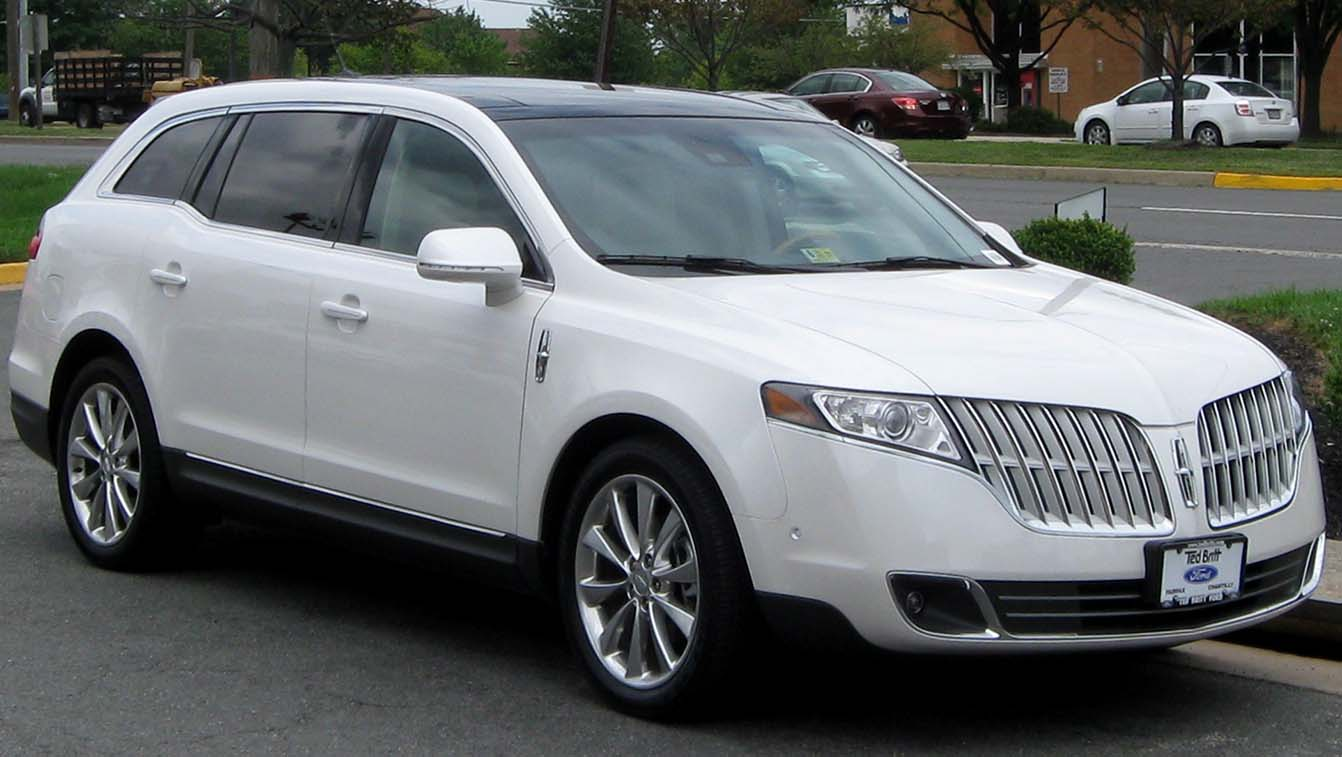
2010 Lincoln MKT

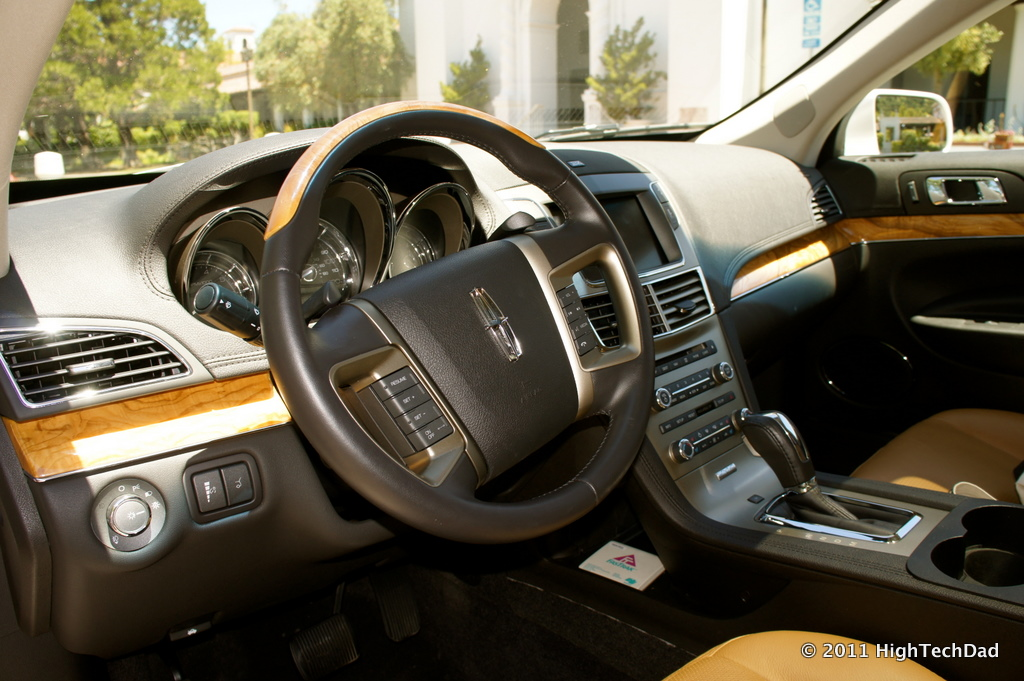
2010-2012 Lincoln MKT dashboard

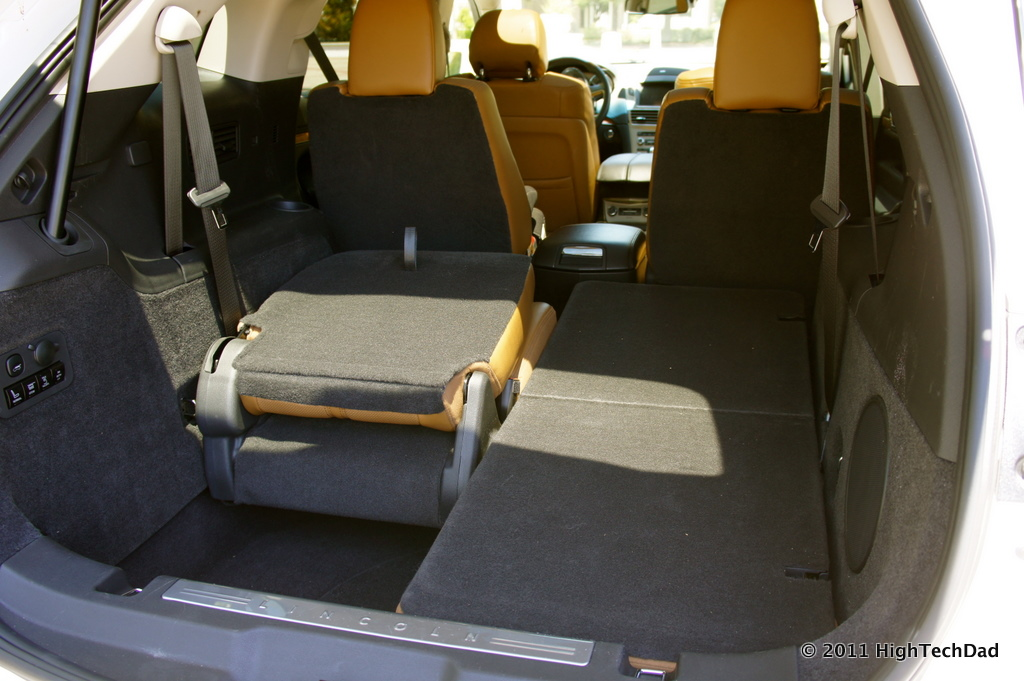
6-passenger Lincoln MKT, third row seats folded and stowed

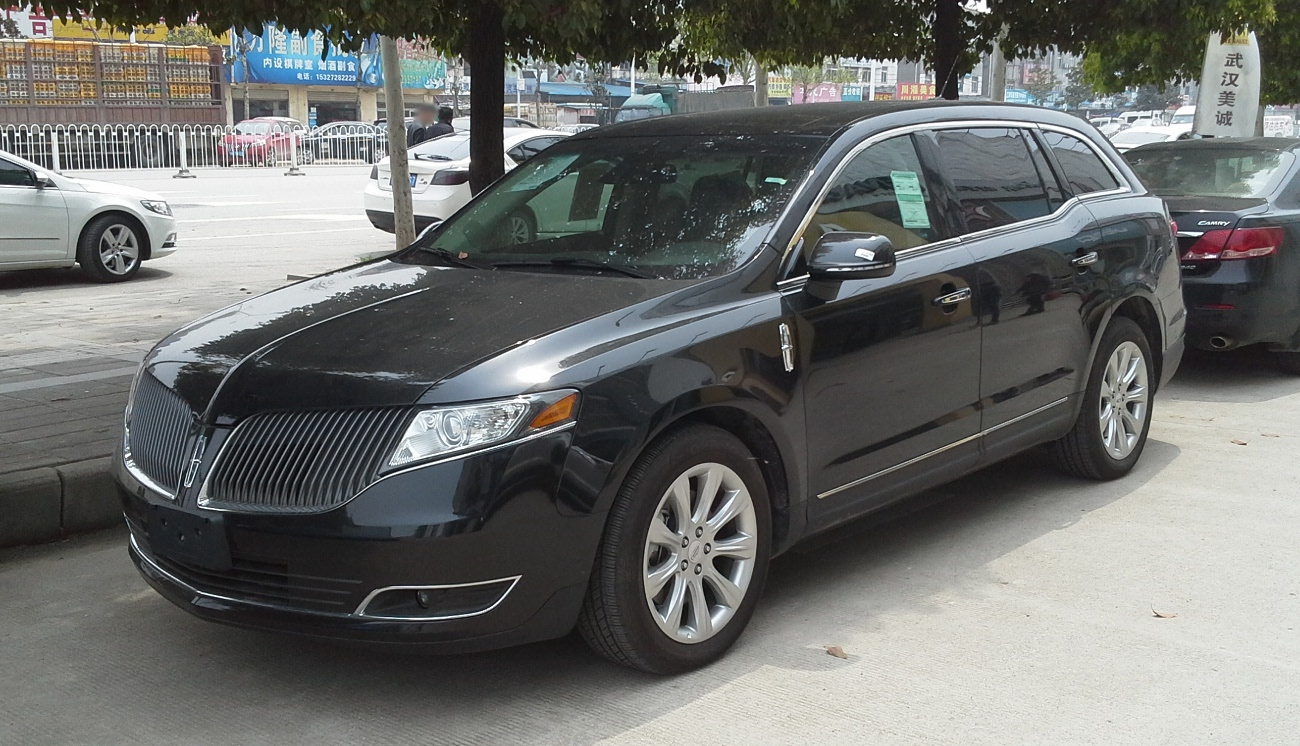
2013-2016 Lincoln MKT (China export)

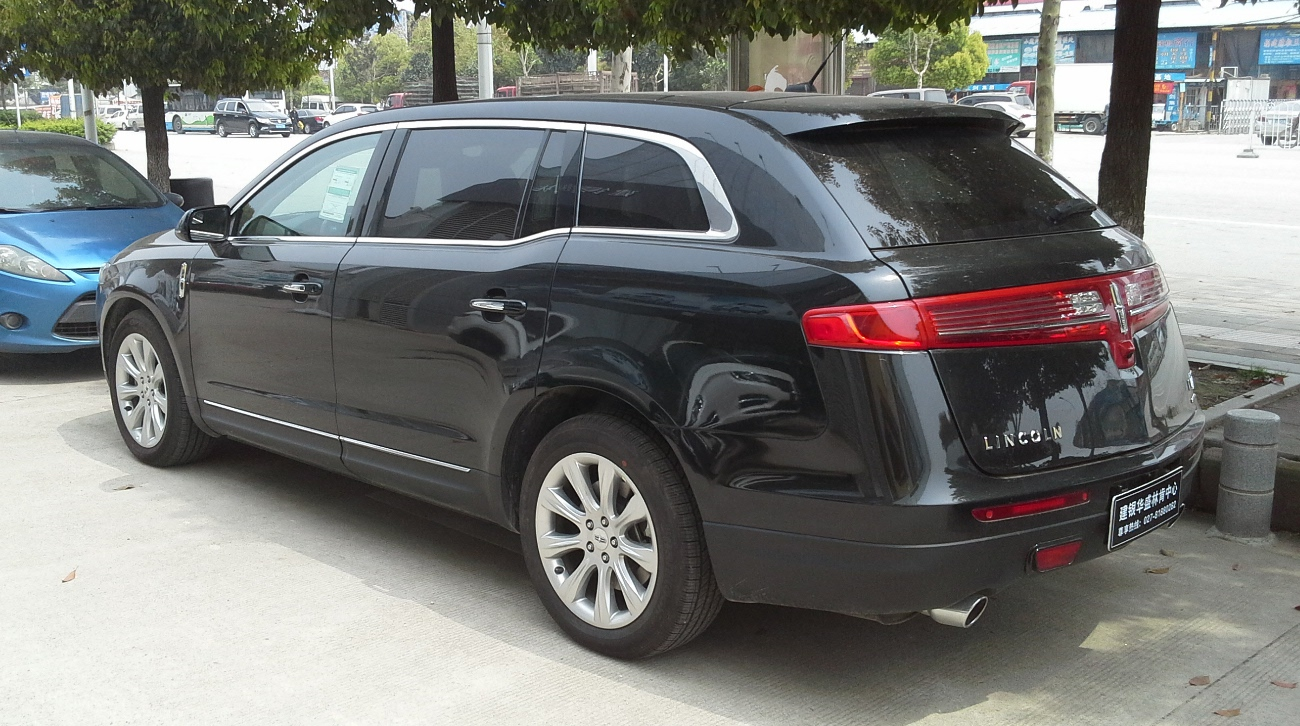
2013-2016 Lincoln MKT (China export)

=== Trim ===
From 2010 to 2016 (with the exception of the Town Car livery variants) the Lincoln MKT was not sold by trim level, with examples largely identified by their engine and drivetrain configuration. To bring the MKT in line with other Lincoln vehicles, for 2017, the MKT adopted a Premiere base model, with the Reserve as the top-trim model.

For the 2019 model year, Lincoln dropped the naturally aspirated 3.7L V6 Duratec engine from the trim lineup making the Twin-Turbocharged 3.5L V6 EcoBoost the sole engine.

=== Safety ===
2015 Lincoln MKT on IIHS
Category	Rating
Moderate overlap frontal offset	Good
Side impact	Good
Roof strength	Good^{2}

2 strength-to-weight ratio: 4.29

The MKT has a rollover risk of 15.1% for the 4-wheel drive version, and 16.4% for the front-wheel drive version.

== Sales ==
Calendar year	American sales	Ref
2009	2,580	
2010	7,435	
2011	5,024	
2012	7,094	
2013	6,014	
2014	4,800	
2015	4,696	
2016	4,028	
2017	3,005	
2018	2,324	
2019	3,388	
2020	329	

== Livery use ==
In October 2010, Ford announced the development of livery and limousine variants of the MKT as potential replacements for the Lincoln Town Car. In February 2011, Ford unveiled the Lincoln MKT Town Car to the limousine and livery trade. To accommodate the weight of the heavier vehicle, the all-wheel drive powertrain is fitted to all limousines, along with heavy-duty brakes, suspension, and electric power steering.

Serving as a replacement for the long-running Town Car sedan, the MKT Town Car uses the same body as the production vehicle, with several changes made to the interior. In place of the three-row seating, the rear row of seating is removed; the three-passenger bench seat is moved several inches rearward to increase rear legroom while the third-row seating area is converted to additional luggage space.

The MKT Limousine uses the rear seating configuration of the MKT Town Car, but is designed for conversion to a stretch limousine. As with the previous Lincoln Town Car, Ford Motor Company allows the MKT Limousine to be stretched to a maximum of 120 inches over its original length.

Through a Ford QVM (Quality Vehicle Modifier), the Lincoln MKT is also available for conversion to a hearse, involving many of the same chassis modifications used for a livery vehicle.

In 2013, the 2.0L EcoBoost inline-4 became available for the MKT Town Car, available only through special order; it is not available on a standard production MKT.

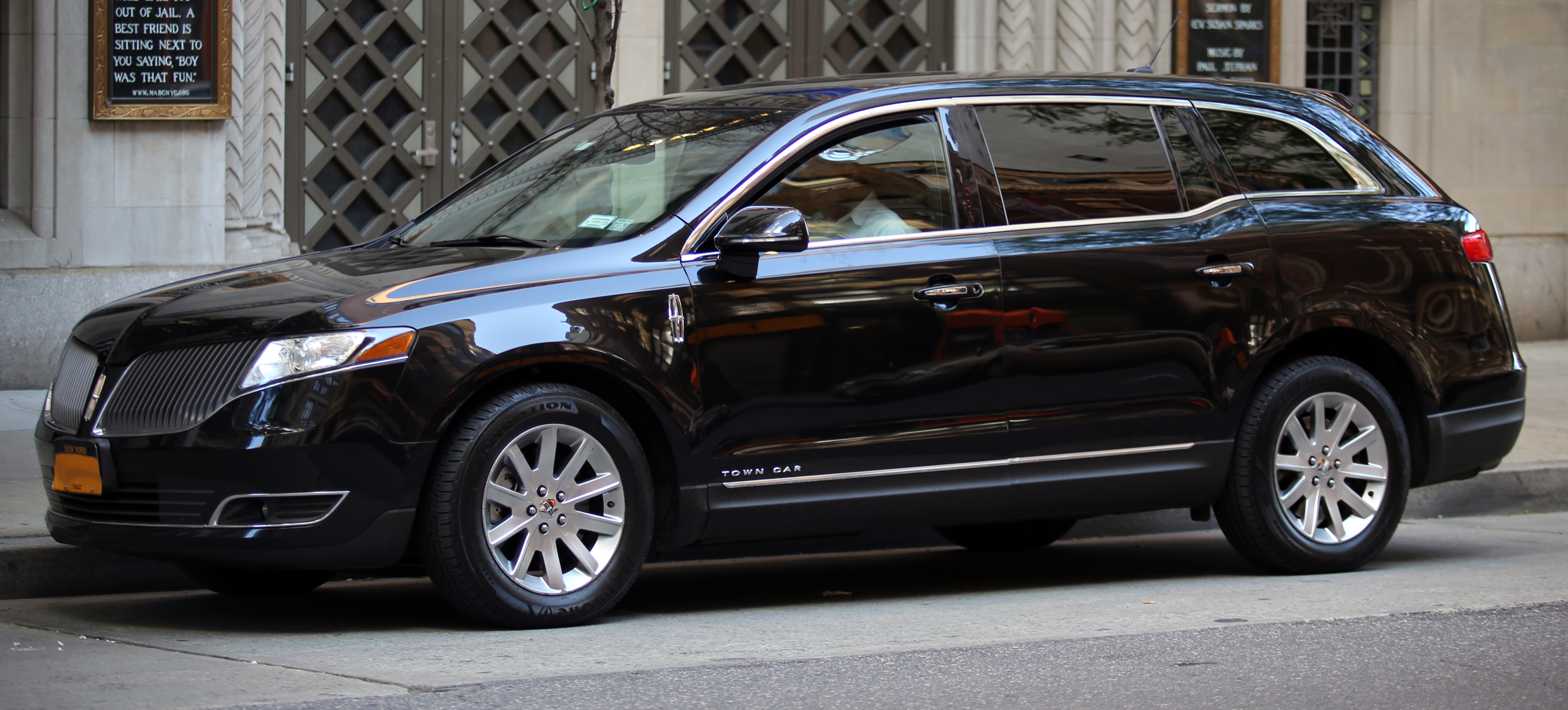
Lincoln MKT Town Car (New York City)

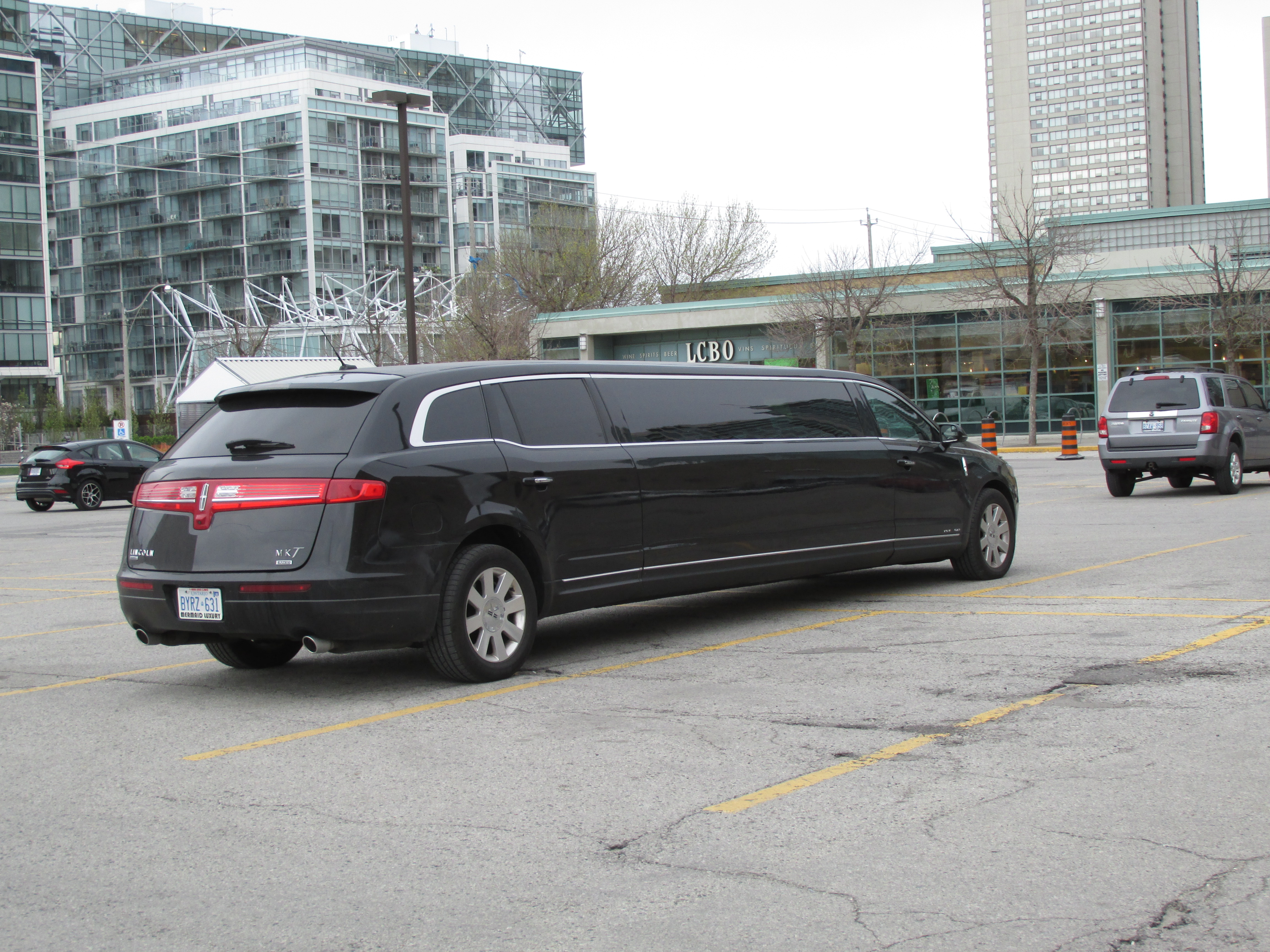
Lincoln MKT stretch limousine (Toronto)

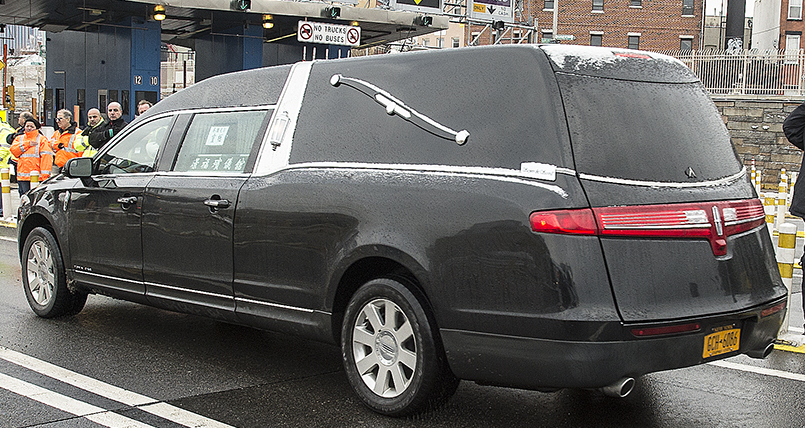
Lincoln MKT hearse

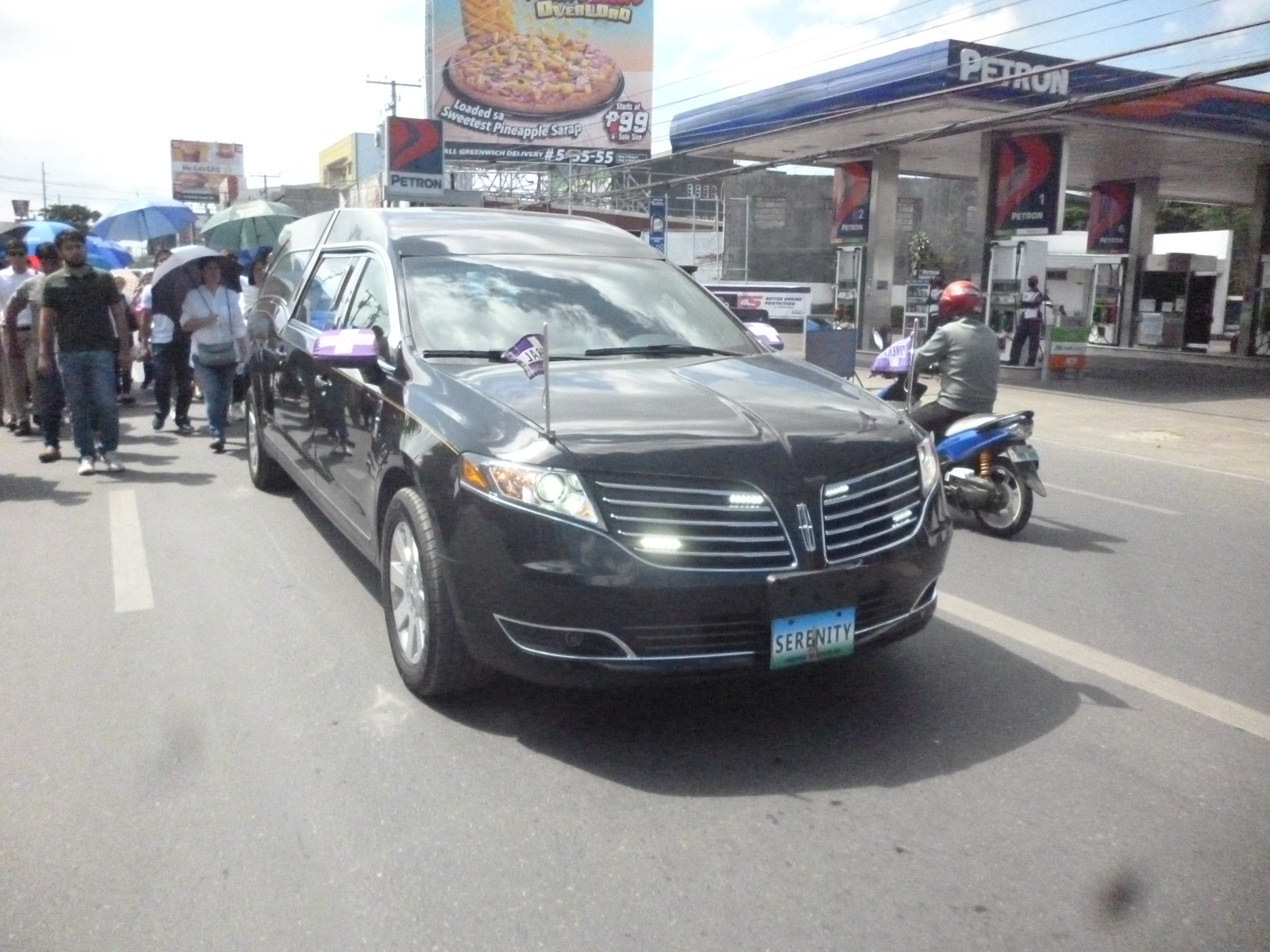
Lincoln MKT hearse in the Philippines
