= Oakville Assembly =

Automobile factory in Oakville, Ontario, Canada

Oakville Assembly Complex
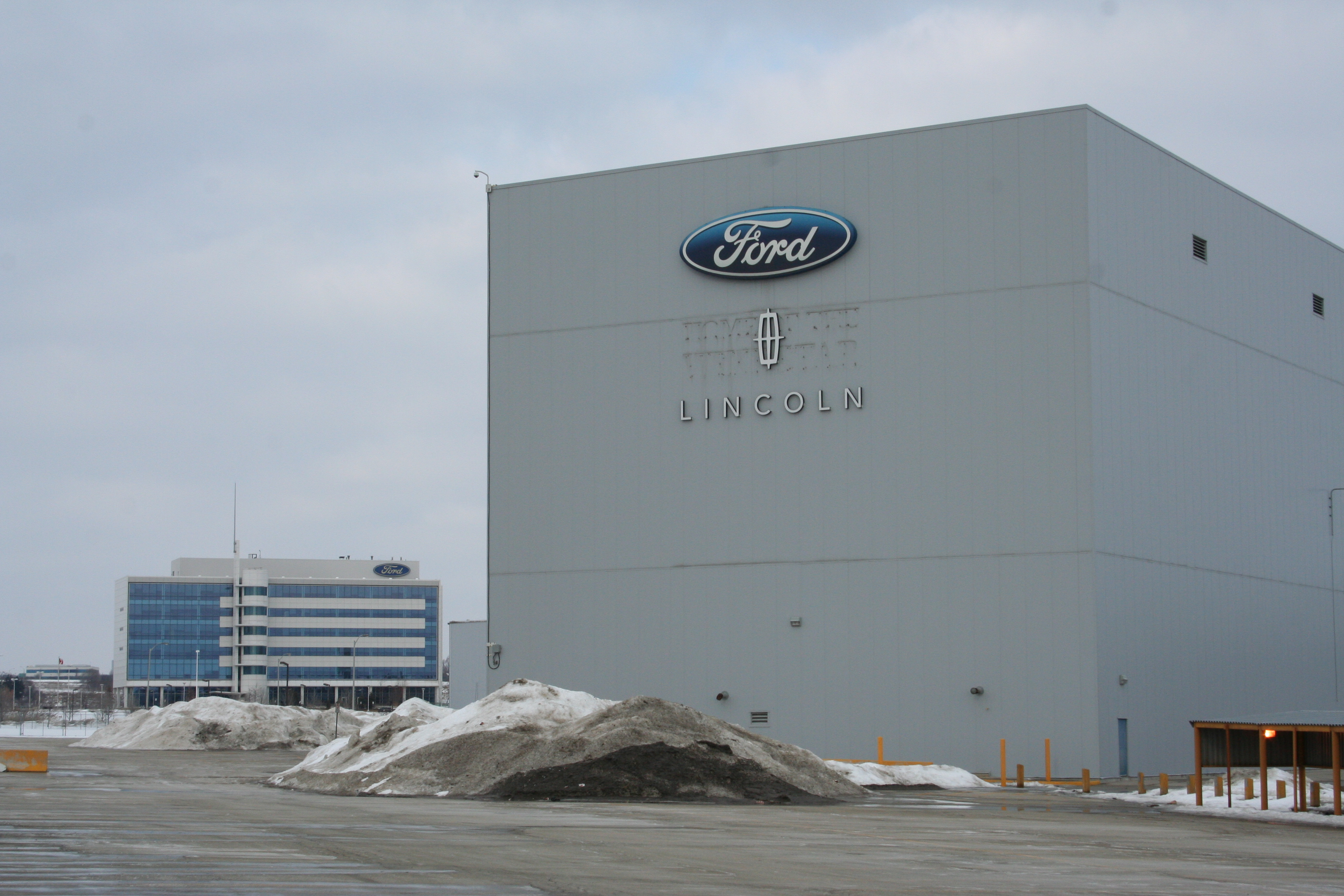
- Site of Oakville Assembly Complex
- Built: 1953
- Operated: 1953–present
- Location: 1400 The Canadian Road; Oakville, Ontario, Canada
- Coordinates: 43°28′57.81″N 79°40′6.51″W
- Industry: Automotive
- Employees: 3,400
- Area: 487 acres (197 ha)
- Volume: 5,460,000 square feet (507,000 m^{2})
- Owner: Ford Motor Company of Canada

The Oakville Assembly Complex is a Ford Motor Company of Canada automobile factory in Oakville, Ontario, spanning 487 acres. This landmark occupies the same site as, and combines, the former Ontario Truck plant and Oakville Assembly Plant. Clearly visible from the Queen Elizabeth Way and the Lakeshore West GO Train line, it relies on the nearby railway service to transport parts and vehicles throughout the country.

== History ==
The first car plant on this site opened in 1953, and produced nearly all of the vehicles for Ford in Canada until 1966. It was the site of production for the company's minivans but was renovated with a CA$1 billion investment to produce crossover CUVs by 2006. Phase one was completed with the launch of the Edge and the MKX in the fall of 2006 and phase two was completed by spring of 2008 with the launch of the Ford Flex. In addition to the human workers, 440 robots help to assist in the production of new automobiles. The company has two different shifts that last from 8–10 hours (depending on the economy and the demand for new automobiles). As of 2002, up to 211,000 new vehicles can be manufactured and assembled within a typical year.

In 2013, Ford announced an investment of CA$700 million to upgrade the plant to manufacture vehicles of global platform with the assistance from the governments of Canada and Ontario of CA$140 million worth to the project. The plant assembled 255,924 vehicles in 2012, and 258,358 vehicles in 2013.

Ford ended the production of the Lincoln MKT in October 2019 and the Ford Flex the following month, the company laid off 450 of its 4,200 plant workers in early 2020.

The plant planned to produce electric vehicles and assemble batteries, starting from 2025, after a major retooling from 2024. Government of Canada and the province of Ontario are responsible to contribute a total of CA$500 million. Following the cancellation of the Ford Explorer EV and Lincoln Aviator EV models, Ford announced that the plant would instead build Ford Super Duty trucks starting in 2026.

== Products ==
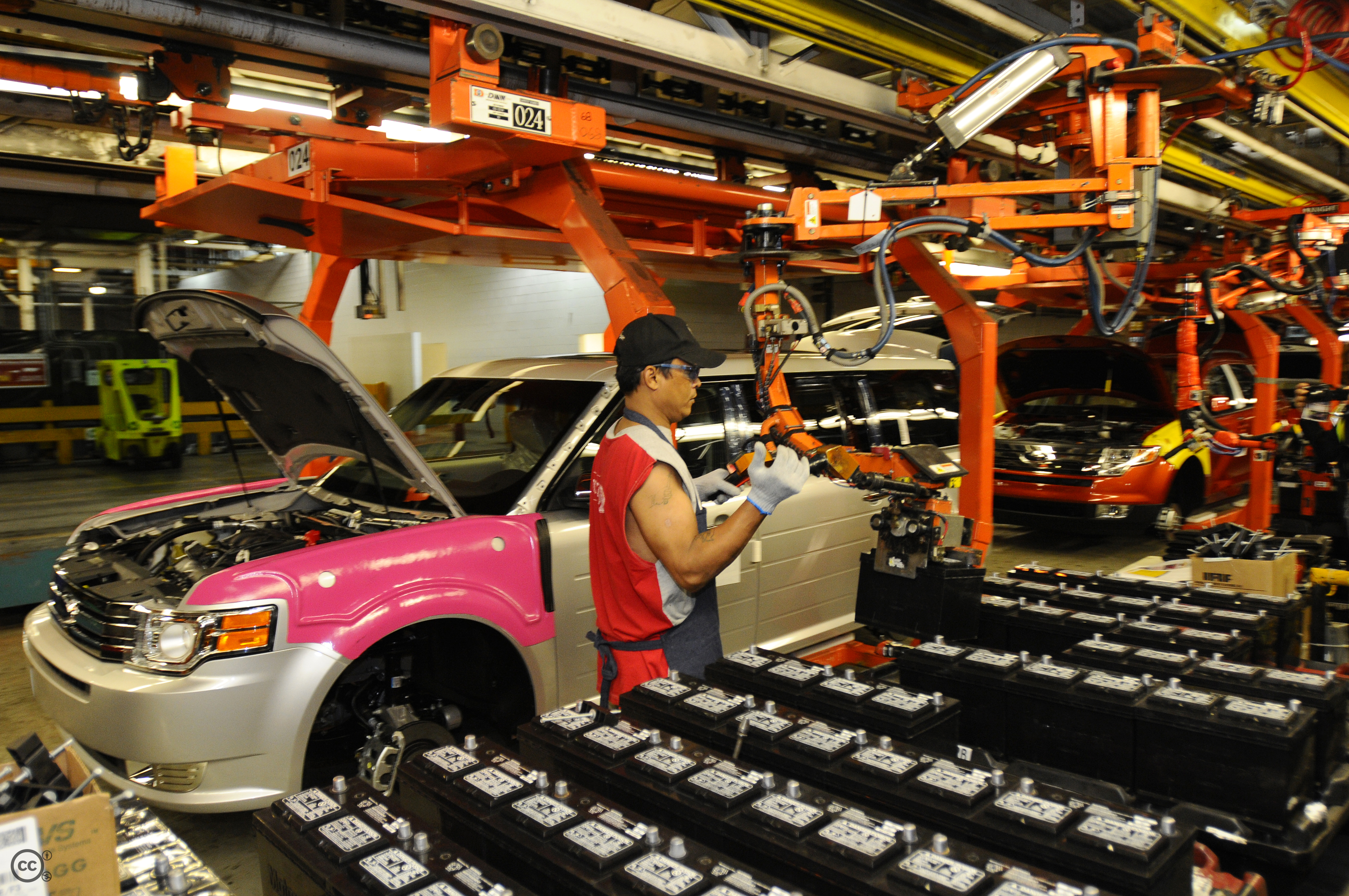
A worker on the line installs a battery on a Ford Flex.

=== Current ===
- Ford Super Duty (2027–present)

=== Former ===
- Edsel Citation (1958)
- Edsel Pacer (1958)
- Edsel Corsair (1958–1959)
- Edsel Ranger (1958–1959)
- Ford Falcon (1959–1963)
- Frontenac (1960)
- Mercury Comet (1962–1967)
- Ford F-Series (1965–2004)
- Ford Custom 500 (1973–1981)
- Ford LTD (1975–1982)
- Mercury Lynx (1981–1987)
- Ford Escort (1981–1990)
- Ford Tempo (1984–1994)
- Mercury Topaz (1984–1994)
- Ford Windstar (1995–2003)
- Ford Freestar (2004–2007)
- Mercury Monterey (2004–2007)
- Lincoln MKX (2007–2018)
- Ford Edge (2007–2024)
- Ford Flex (2009–2019)
- Lincoln MKT (2010–2019)
- Lincoln Nautilus (2019–2023)

== See also ==
- List of Ford factories
