= Ford Cyclone engine =

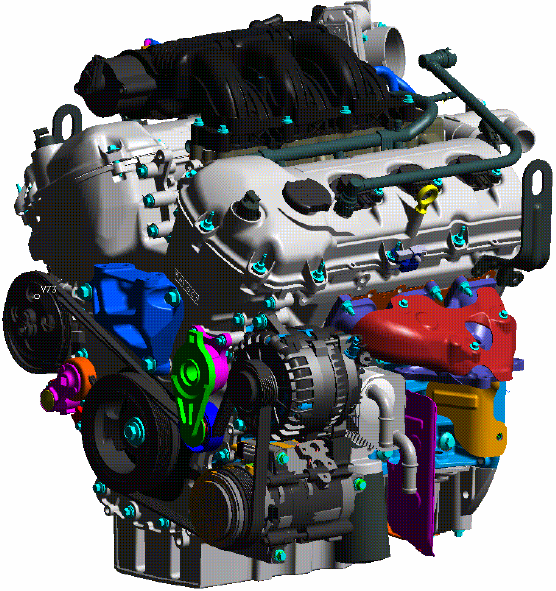

Overview
- Manufacturer: Ford Motor Company
- Also called: Duratec; MZI (Mazda); EcoBoost
- Production: 2006–present

Layout
- Configuration: 60° V6
- Displacement: 3.3 L; 203.8 cu in (3,339 cc); 3.5 L; 213.3 cu in (3,496 cc); 3.7 L; 227.4 cu in (3,726 cc)
- Cylinder bore: 90.4 mm (3.56 in); 92.5 mm (3.64 in); 95.5 mm (3.76 in)
- Piston stroke: 86.7 mm (3.41 in)
- Cylinder block material: Aluminum
- Cylinder head material: Aluminum
- Valvetrain: DOHC four valves per cylinder with VCT and Ti-VCT (later models)
- Valvetrain drive system: Timing chain

Combustion
- Turbocharger: Twin-turbo (on Ecoboost engine)
- Fuel system: Sequential fuel injection Direct injection (turbocharged models)
- Fuel type: Gasoline
- Cooling system: Water-cooled

Output
- Power output: 262–350 hp (195–261 kW)
- Torque output: 248–320 lb⋅ft (336–434 N⋅m)

Chronology
- Predecessor: Ford Duratec V6
- Successor: Ford Nano V6

The Cyclone engine, also branded Duratec, is a DOHC family of gasoline V6 engines introduced in 2006 by Ford Motor Company. The Cyclone succeeds Ford's previous V6 engine families, including the Canadian-built Ford Essex engine introduced in 1982, the Ford Vulcan engine introduced in 1985, the original Duratec V6 introduced in 1993, and the Ford Cologne V6 engine, whose design dates back to 1962. The first version of the Cyclone engine, a 3.5 L V6, appeared in the 2007 Ford Edge and the Lincoln-badged luxury variant, the Lincoln MKX, as well as the Lincoln MKZ. Mazda badges its versions of the Cyclone MZI, as it did with its versions of the Duratec V6.

Although Ford continues to use the Duratec name, the Cyclone shares no components or design with the previous Duratec and was entirely new.

Notable Cyclone features include a capacity for displacements ranging up to 4.0 L, DOHC four valves per cylinder, direct-acting mechanical bucket (DAMB) camshaft tappets, variable cam timing (iVCT) on the intake camshafts, and twin-independent variable cam timing (Ti-VCT) on some later versions. Features such as gasoline direct injection and turbocharging were considerations in the design phase and have been added to the engine as part of EcoBoost. The 3.5 L is ULEV-II compliant and is capable of meeting the PZEV requirement.

== 3.3 L ==
The Duratec 33 3.3 L; 203.8 cu in (3,339 cc) is a downsized version of Duratec 35 with both port and direct injection starting in 2018 model year for Ford F-150, serving as the new base engine.

Vehicle	Horsepower	Torque	Notes
2018–2023 Ford F-150	290 hp (216 kW) at 6,500 rpm	265 lb⋅ft (359 N⋅m) at 4,000 rpm	Naturally Aspirated
2020–present Ford Police Interceptor Utility	285 hp (213 kW) at 6,500 rpm	260 lb⋅ft (353 N⋅m) at 4,000 rpm	Naturally Aspirated
2020–present Ford Explorer Hybrid	285 hp (213 kW) 318 hp (237 kW) combined at 6,500 rpm	260 lb⋅ft (353 N⋅m) 322 lb⋅ft (437 N⋅m) combined at 4,000 rpm	318 hp (237 kW) and 322 lb⋅ft (437 N⋅m) combined

== 3.5 L ==
The Duratec 35 displaces 3.5 L; 213.3 cu in (3,496 cc) with a 92.5 mm × 86.7 mm (3.64 in × 3.41 in) bore and stroke. Due to packaging differences in transverse (FWD) applications, the water pump is relocated to the valley behind the timing cover and is driven by the timing chain. The 3.5 L engine will fit into any engine bay the smaller Duratec 3.0 L will, and replaced it in some applications (notably the Ford Taurus) in the 2008 model year. Production began in 2006 for the Ford Edge, Lincoln MKX, and Lincoln MKZ.

Official SAE certified engine output is 265 hp (198 kW) and 250 lb⋅ft (339 N⋅m) on 87 octane gas. This is a substantial upgrade in power from the Duratec 30 and bested all comparable 87 octane-rated V6 engines at the time of its launch. For 2011, the 3.5 L received Ti-VCT, helping to boost output to 285 hp (213 kW) and 253 lb⋅ft (343 N⋅m). The 3.5 L's highest output to date is 290 bhp (216 kW; 294 PS). This version was used in the redesigned 2011 Ford Explorer.

The engine is assembled at Lima Engine in Lima, Ohio, with expansion planned in Cleveland Engine Plant #1.

The 3.5 L was on the Ward's 10 Best Engines list for 2007.

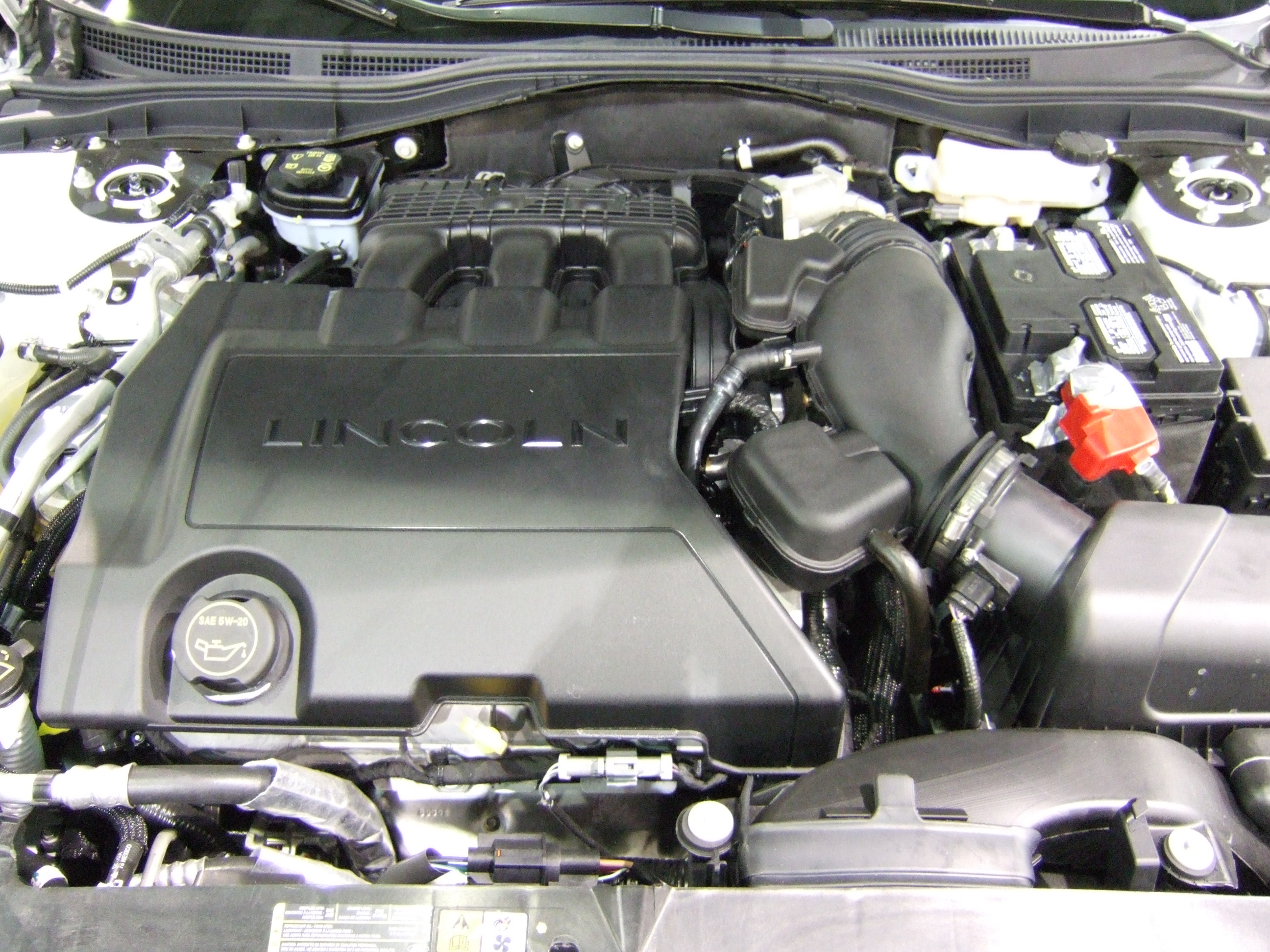
The 3.5 L Duratec 35 installed in a 2007 Lincoln MKZ

=== Applications ===
Vehicle	Horsepower	Torque	Cam Phasing
2007–2010 Ford Edge 2007–2010 Lincoln MKX	265 hp (198 kW) at 6,250	250 lb⋅ft (339 N⋅m) at 4,500	iVCT
2007–2012 Lincoln MKZ 2007 Mazda CX-9 (MZI) 2008–2012 Ford Taurus 2008–2009 Ford Taurus X 2008–2009 Mercury Sable 2010–2012 Ford Fusion Sport	263 hp (196 kW) at 6,250	249 lb⋅ft (338 N⋅m) at 4,500	iVCT
2009–2012 Ford Flex	262 hp (195 kW) at 6,250	248 lb⋅ft (336 N⋅m) at 4,500	iVCT
2015–2017 Ford F-150	282 hp (210 kW) at 6,500	253 lb⋅ft (343 N⋅m) at 4,000	Ti-VCT
2011–2014 Ford Edge	285 hp (213 kW) at 6,500	253 lb⋅ft (343 N⋅m) at 4,000	Ti-VCT
2015–2018 Ford Edge	280 hp (209 kW) at 6,500	250 lb⋅ft (339 N⋅m) at 4,000	Ti-VCT
2013–2019 Ford Flex	287 hp (214 kW) at 6,500	254 lb⋅ft (344 N⋅m) at 4,000	Ti-VCT
2013–2019 Ford Taurus	288 hp (215 kW) at 6,500	254 lb⋅ft (344 N⋅m) at 4,000	Ti-VCT
2013–2019 Ford Police Interceptor Sedan	288 hp (215 kW) at 6,500	254 lb⋅ft (344 N⋅m) at 4,000	Ti-VCT
2011–2019 Ford Explorer	290 hp (216 kW) at 6,500	255 lb⋅ft (346 N⋅m) at 4,000	Ti-VCT

== EcoBoost ==
It is a twin-turbocharged, gasoline direct injected (GTDI) version of the 3.5 L. This engine is used in the 2013-2019 Ford Explorer Sport, 2010-2019 Ford Taurus SHO, 2014-2019 Ford Flex Limited EcoBoost, 2010-2019 Lincoln MKT EcoBoost, and 2010-2016 Lincoln MKS, and is optional for both the 2014-2019 Ford Police Interceptor sedan and Ford Police Interceptor Utility, which are based on the Taurus and Explorer, respectively.

== 3.7 L ==
The Duratec 37 is a 3.7 L; 227.4 cu in (3,726 cc) version of the Cyclone V6 intended to power heavier or premium vehicles. The 3.7 L's additional displacement comes from an increase in bore diameter to 95.5 mm (3.76 in), stroke remains identical to the 3.5 L at 86.7 mm (3.41 in). Ford Power Products sells this engine as the CSG-637 for industrial uses starting in mid-2015, which replaced the 4.2 L Essex and is manufactured under license by Engine Distributors Inc.

A Hiroshima, Japan-assembled Mazda MZI 3.7 was installed in the 2008 Mazda CX-9 and was the first 3.7 L Cyclone V6 to see production. The first Ford application of the 3.7 L was the 2009 Lincoln MKS.

A few days before the 2009 Los Angeles International Auto Show, Ford unveiled a new version of the 3.7 L for the 2011 Mustang, making it the first Duratec-badged V6 since the Lincoln LS to be used in a production rear-wheel drive car. This version of the 3.7 L (3,726 cc) features twin independent variable cam timing (Ti-VCT), delivers 31 mpg_{‑US} (7.6 L/100 km; 37 mpg_{‑imp}) highway mileage in the Mustang, and was the first production engine to deliver in excess of 300 hp (224 kW) and 30 mpg_{‑US} (7.8 L/100 km; 36 mpg_{‑imp}).

=== Applications ===
Vehicle	Horsepower	Torque	Cam Phasing
2008–2015 Mazda CX-9 (MZI)	273 hp (204 kW) at 6,250	270 lb⋅ft (366 N⋅m) at 4,250	iVCT
2009–2013 Mazda 6 (MZI)	272 hp (203 kW) at 6,250	269 lb⋅ft (365 N⋅m) at 4,250	iVCT
2009–2012 Lincoln MKS	275 hp (205 kW) at 6,250	276 lb⋅ft (374 N⋅m) at 4,250	iVCT
2010–2012 Lincoln MKT	268 hp (200 kW) at 6,250	267 lb⋅ft (362 N⋅m) at 4,250	iVCT
2011–2014 Ford F-150	302 hp (225 kW) at 6,500	278 lb⋅ft (377 N⋅m) at 4,000	Ti-VCT
2011–2014 Ford Mustang 2011–2015 Lincoln MKX 2011–2014 Ford Edge Sport	305 hp (227 kW) at 6,500	280 lb⋅ft (380 N⋅m) at 4,250	Ti-VCT
2012-2019 Morgan Roadster 3.7	280 hp (209 kW) at 6,000	280 lb⋅ft (380 N⋅m) at 4,500	Ti-VCT
2013–2016 Lincoln MKZ	300 hp (224 kW) at 6,500	277 lb⋅ft (376 N⋅m) at 4,000	Ti-VCT
2013–2016 Lincoln MKS	304 hp (227 kW) at 6,500	279 lb⋅ft (378 N⋅m) at 4,000	Ti-VCT
2013–2018 Lincoln MKT	300 hp (224 kW) at 6,500	275 lb⋅ft (373 N⋅m) at 4,000	Ti-VCT
2013–present Radical RXC V6	350 hp (261 kW) at 6,750	320 lb⋅ft (434 N⋅m) at 4,250	Ti-VCT
2012–2015 Ginetta G60	310 hp (231 kW) at 6,500	288 lb⋅ft (390 N⋅m) at 4,500	Ti-VCT
2015–2019 Ford Transit	275 hp (205 kW) at 6000	260 lb⋅ft (353 N⋅m) at 4,000	Ti-VCT
2015–2017 Ford Mustang	300 hp (224 kW) at 6,500	280 lb⋅ft (380 N⋅m) at 4,000	Ti-VCT
2016 AM General MV-1	275 hp (205 kW) at 6,250	260 lb⋅ft (353 N⋅m) at 4,000	Ti-VCT
2016–2018 Lincoln MKX	303 hp (226 kW) at 6,500	278 lb⋅ft (377 N⋅m) at 4,000	Ti-VCT
2017–2020 Lincoln Continental	305 hp (227 kW) at 6,500	280 lb⋅ft (380 N⋅m) at 4,000	Ti-VCT
2015–present CSG-637 by Ford Power Products			
2013-2019 Ford Police Interceptor Utility	304 hp (227 kW) at 6,500	279 lb⋅ft (378 N⋅m) at 4,000	Ti-VCT
2013–2019 Ford Police Interceptor Sedan	305 hp (227 kW) at 6,500	279 lb⋅ft (378 N⋅m) at 4,000	Ti-VCT

=== Water pump issues ===
Water pumps on transversely mounted 3.5 L V6, 3.5 L EcoBoost V6, and 3.7 L V6 engines have a tendency to fail and potentially ruin the engine when they do. The water pumps on these engines are internally mounted and driven by the timing chain. As a result, when they fail, antifreeze is dumped directly into the crankcase, mixing with engine oil and potentially damaging the head gaskets and connecting rod bearings. Many of these water pump failures occur without warning and repairs often cost thousands of dollars, as the engine needs to be disassembled or removed from the vehicle to access the water pump. In some cases, the engine needs to be replaced outright. A class-action lawsuit was started against Ford as a result of this issue, but it was dismissed and no recall was given. All longitudinally mounted versions of the 3.3, 3.5, 3.5 EcoBoost, and 3.7 V6 use an external water pump.

=== Affected vehicles ===
- 2008-09 Mercury Sable
- 2008-09 Ford Taurus X
- 2007-18 Ford Edge
- 2009-19 Ford Flex
- 2010-12 Ford Fusion Sport
- 2007-16 Lincoln MKZ
- 2009-13 Mazda 6 3.7L V6
- 2007-15 Mazda CX-9
- 2008-19 Ford Taurus (including SHO)
- 2017-20 Lincoln Continental
- 2007-18 Lincoln MKX
- 2010-19 Lincoln MKT
- 2011-19 Ford Explorer
- 2013-19 Ford Police Interceptor Sedan
- 2013-19 Ford Police Interceptor Utility
- 2009-16 Lincoln MKS

== See also ==
- List of Ford engines
