= Lincoln Nautilus =

Mid-size luxury crossover SUV

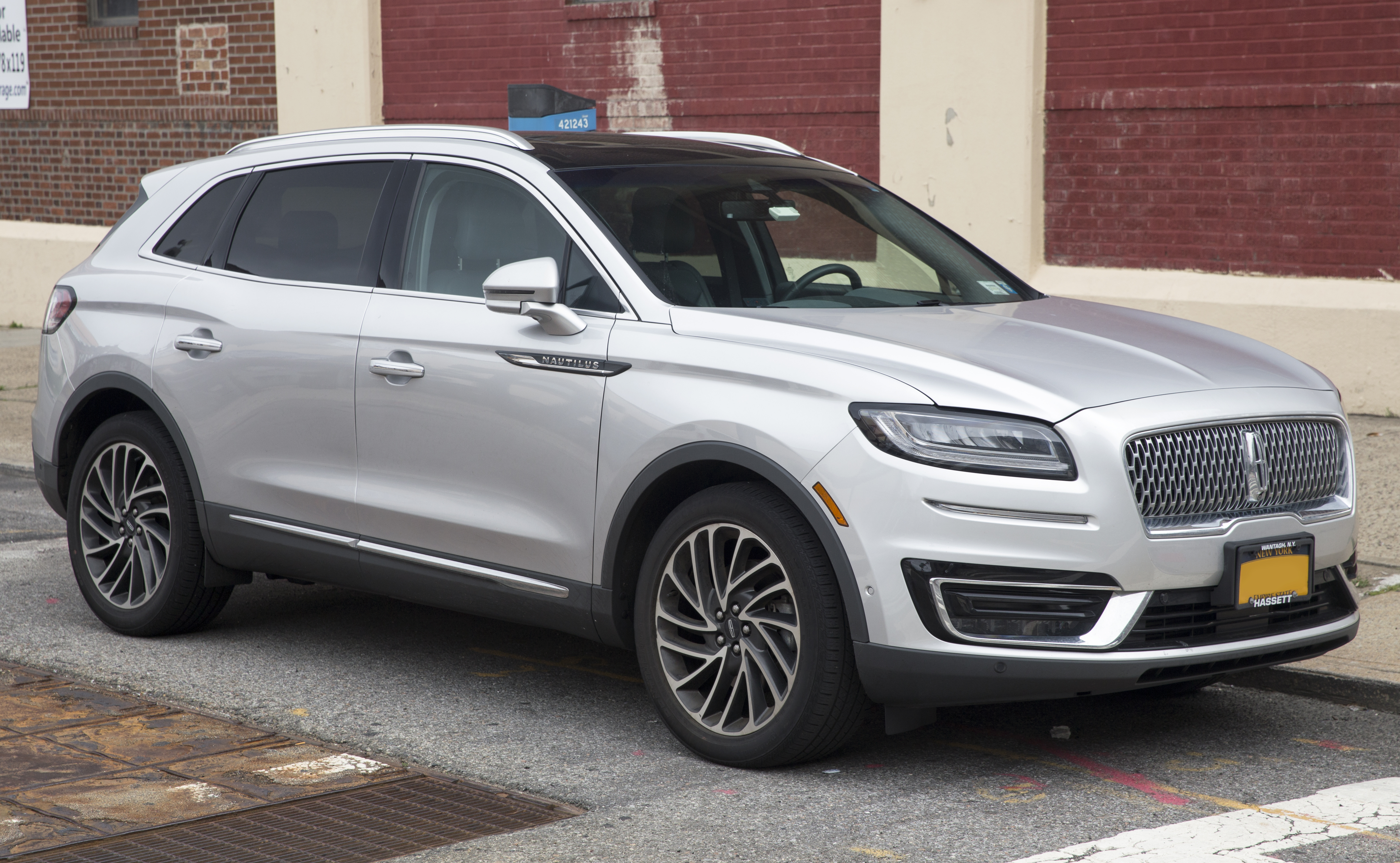
- 2019 Lincoln Nautilus

Overview
- Manufacturer: Ford Motor Company
- Production: 2018–present
- Model years: 2019–present

Body and chassis
- Class: Mid-size luxury crossover SUV
- Body style: 5-door SUV
- Layout: Front-engine, front-wheel-drive; Front-engine, all-wheel-drive
- Related: Ford Edge

Chronology
- Predecessor: Lincoln MKX

The Lincoln Nautilus is a mid-sized luxury crossover SUV marketed over two generations by Ford Motor Company's Lincoln luxury brand. The Nautilus was initially renamed from the MKX as part of a midcycle update in 2018 for the 2019 model year, as Lincoln phased out its use of "MK" model names. The name Nautilus is derived from the ancient Greek word nautes, meaning "sailor", as in nautical or astronaut.

The first generation is based on the CD4 platform and was manufactured at Oakville Assembly in Oakville, Ontario, Canada, alongside the Ford Edge, Ford Flex, and Lincoln MKT and manufactured in Hangzhou Assembly in Zhejiang, China, by joint venture Changan Ford from 2021 to 2023.

The second generation is solely produced by Changan Ford in China, as Ford was retooling the Oakville Assembly plant to produce electric vehicles. The Nautilus has been Lincoln's best-selling model since 2024.

On August 13, 2026, Ford announced it will discontinue importing the Chinese-made Lincoln Nautilus for the U.S. market by 2030, shifting production to the United States.

== First generation (U540; 2019) ==
First generation
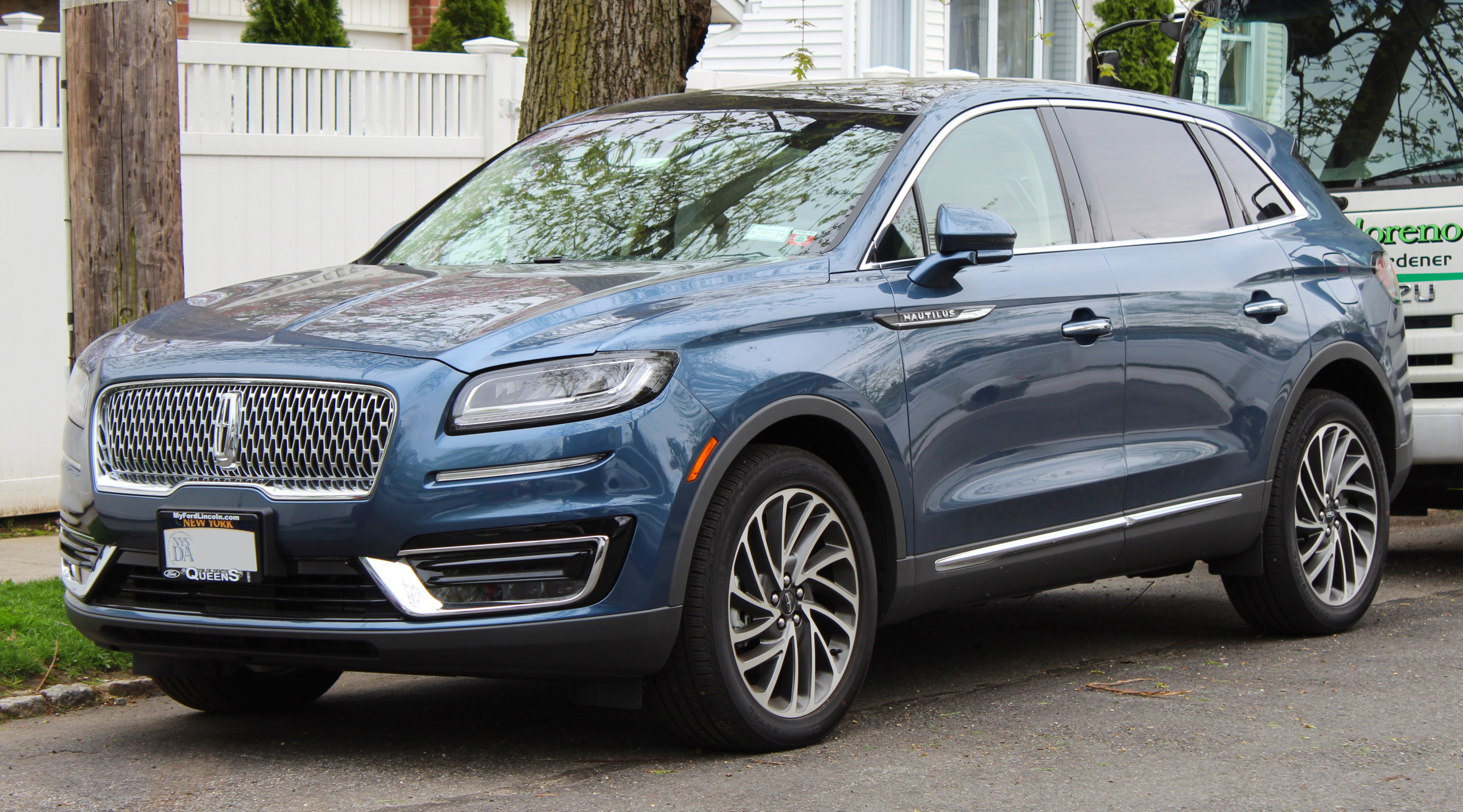

Overview
- Model code: U540
- Also called: Lincoln MKX (2015–2018); Lincoln Legacy/Grand Legacy (hearse)
- Production: 2018–2023
- Model years: 2019–2023
- Assembly: Canada: Oakville, Ontario (Oakville Assembly); China: Hangzhou, Zhejiang (Changan Ford)
- Designer: Kemal Curić

Body and chassis
- Platform: Ford CD4 platform
- Related: Ford Edge (second generation); Ford Fusion/Mondeo; Lincoln MKZ (second generation)

Powertrain
- Engine: Gasoline: 2.0 L EcoBoost I4; 2.7 L EcoBoost V6
- Transmission: 8-speed 8F35 automatic

Dimensions
- Wheelbase: 112.2 in (2,850 mm)
- Length: 190.0 in (4,826 mm)
- Width: 76.2 in (1,935 mm)
- Height: 66.2 in (1,681 mm)
- Curb weight: 4,142–4,442 lb (1,879–2,015 kg)

The Lincoln Nautilus was released as the midcycle revision of the second-generation MKX in November 2017 for the 2019 model year. Adopting the styling of the newly introduced Continental and Navigator, the Nautilus transitioned from the previous split-wing grille to a large, rectangular grille with a large Lincoln star emblem.

The counterpart of the updated Ford Edge, the Nautilus is slotted between the Aviator and the MKC (which was replaced by the Corsair for the 2020 model year) in Lincoln's lineup. A 245-horsepower (248 PS; 183 kW) 2.0-liter EcoBoost inline-four is the standard engine, with a 335-horsepower (340 PS; 250 kW) 2.7-liter EcoBoost V6 carried over from the MKX as an option; both engines are fitted with start-stop capability. An eight-speed automatic transmission is paired to both engines (replacing the previous six-speed).

For the 2021 model year, the Nautilus was once again refreshed with a new interior similar to the new Navigator, Aviator, and Corsair, featuring a larger, 13.2-inch touchscreen and Ford's latest SYNC 4 system. Minor changes were also made to the front bumper.

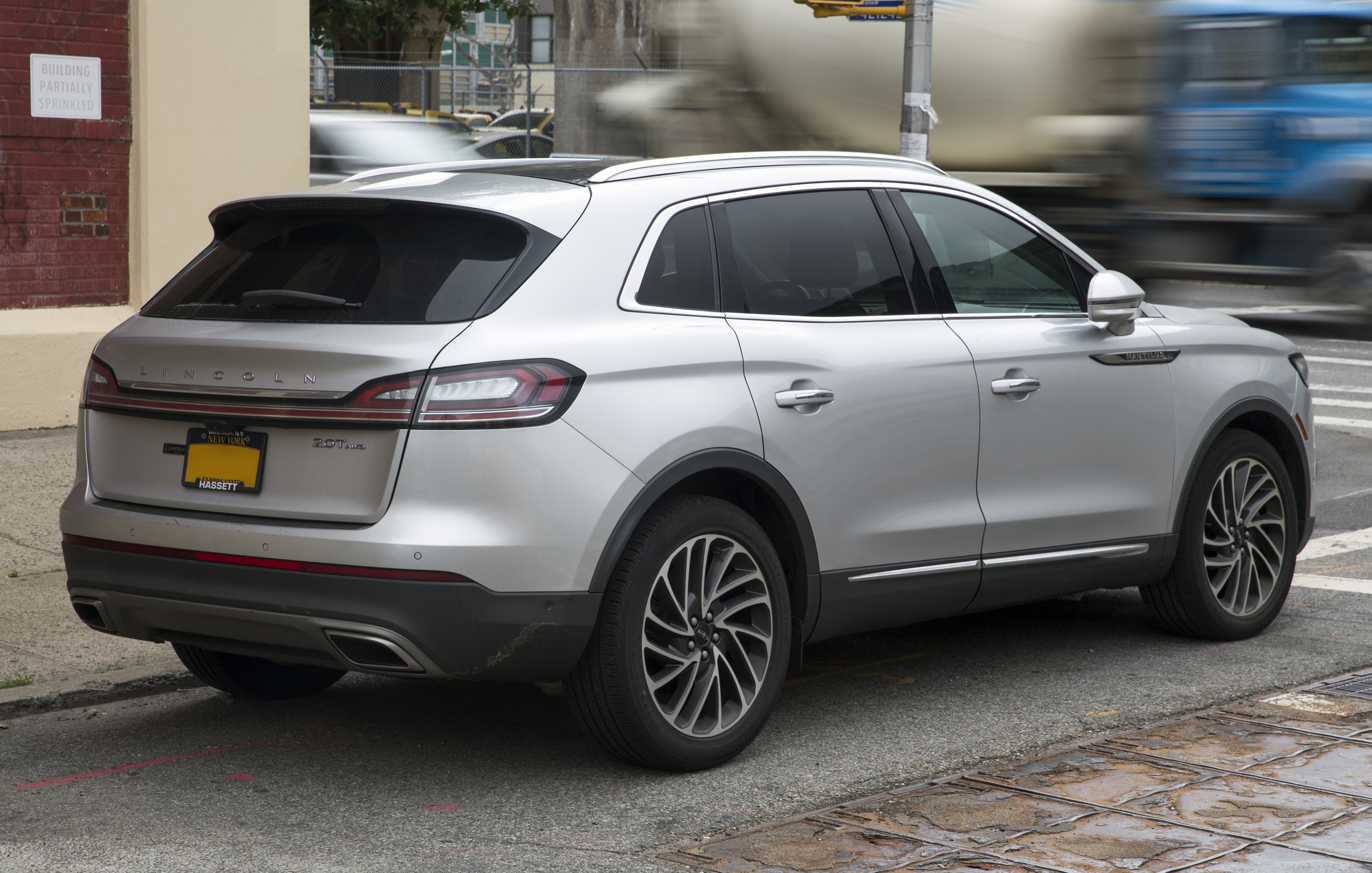
Rear view

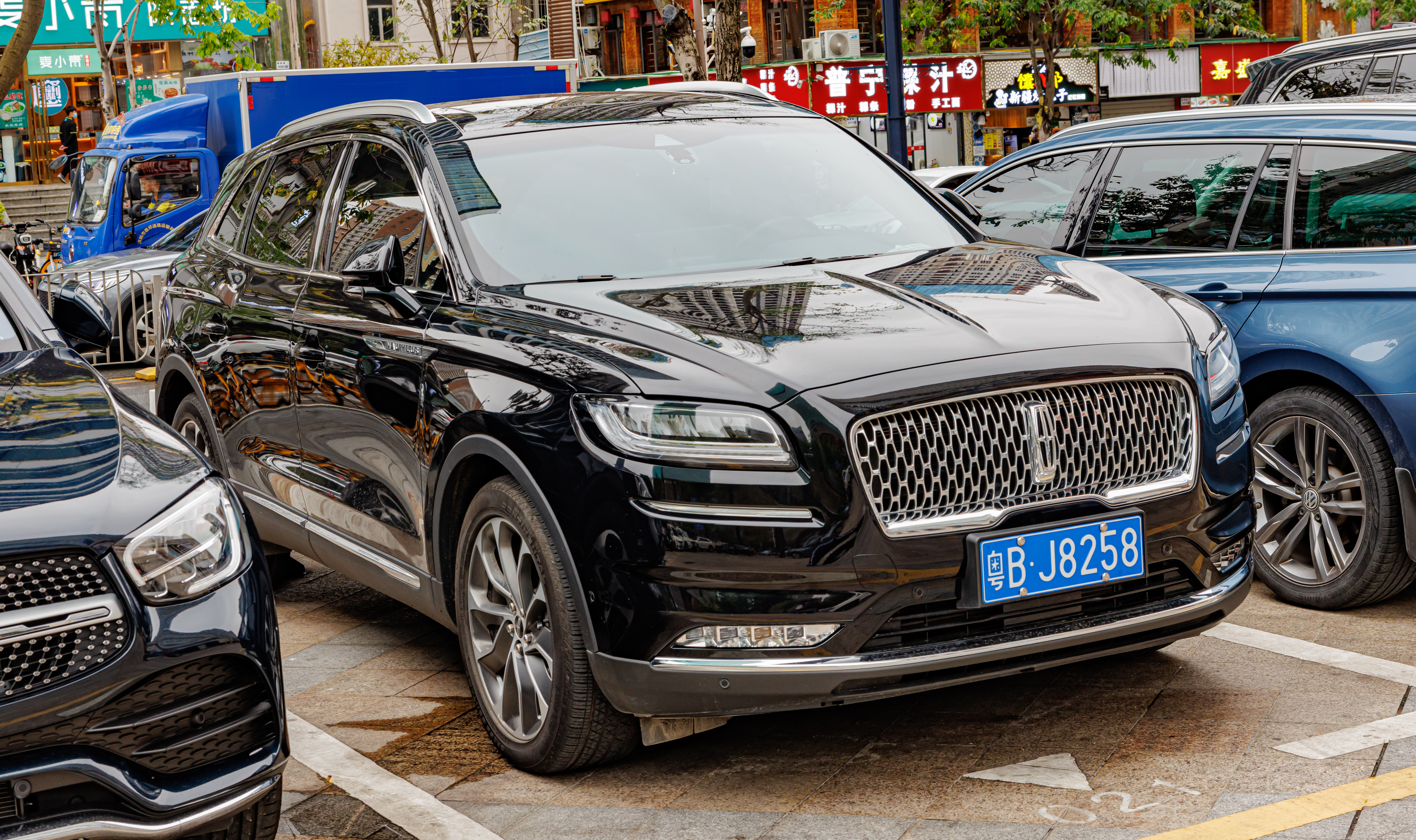
2021 refresh

=== Safety ===
IIHS scores
Small overlap front (driver)	Good		
Small overlap front (passenger)	Good		
Moderate overlap front (original test)	Good		
Side (original test)	Good		
Roof strength	Good		
Head restraints and seats	Good		
Headlights	Poor		
Front crash prevention: vehicle-to-vehicle	Superior		Optional system
Front crash prevention: vehicle-to-vehicle	Superior		Standard system
Front crash prevention: vehicle-to-pedestrian (Day)	Advanced		Optional system
Front crash prevention: vehicle-to-pedestrian (Day)	Advanced		Standard system
Child seat anchors (LATCH) ease of use	Acceptable	Marginal	

== Second generation (CDX707; 2024) ==
Second generation
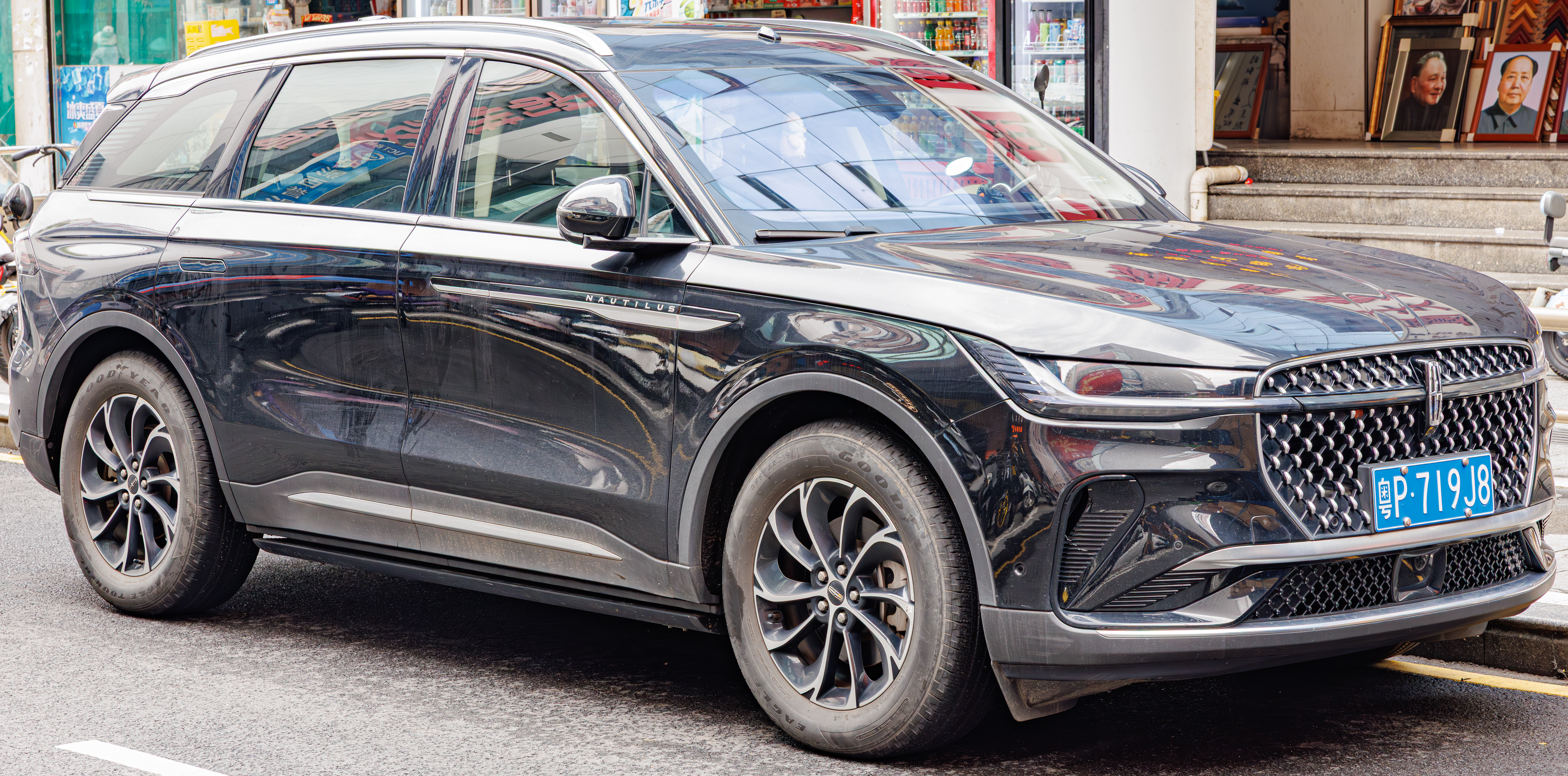

Overview
- Model code: CDX707
- Production: September 2023–present
- Model years: 2024–present
- Assembly: China: Hangzhou, Zhejiang (Changan Ford)
- Designer: Jae Chang, Henri Kavaja, Jordan Meadows

Body and chassis
- Layout: Transverse front-engined, all-wheel drive
- Platform: Ford C2
- Related: Ford Edge L

Powertrain
- Engine: Gasoline: 2.0 L Ecoboost I4 (turbo); Gasoline hybrid: 2.0 L Ecoboost I4 (turbo)
- Electric motor: Permanent magnet synchronous
- Transmission: 8-speed automatic eCVT (Hybrid)
- Battery: 1.1 kWh Li-ion (Hybrid)
- Range: 480–600 mi (770–970 km)

Dimensions
- Wheelbase: 114.2 in (2,900 mm)
- Length: 193.2 in (4,908 mm)
- Width: 76.9 in (1,952 mm)
- Height: 67.6 in (1,717 mm)
- Curb weight: 4,349–4,517 lb (1,973–2,049 kg)

The second-generation Nautilus (Chinese: 航海家; pinyin: háng hǎi jiā; lit. 'Navigator') was released in 2023 for the Chinese market. It is a mid-sized SUV with five seats, available with either a gasoline or a hybrid gasoline-electric powertrain. The North American market Nautilus was presented on April 17, 2023, and went on sale in early 2024, imported from China. The GCC market Nautilus was launched on February 12, 2024.

The interior features a high-mounted, 48-inch display, which integrates both the instrument cluster and forms part of the infotainment system along with a 11.1-inch touchscreen display. The upper display consists of two 24-inch displays mounted directly next to each other and is controlled by the lower touchscreen display, where the user can drag and drop "widgets" to configure the display contents. The second-generation Nautilus is the first model to feature the new Ford/Lincoln Digital Experience, which replaces Ford SYNC 4/4a and is based on Android Automotive OS.

The Nautilus has two powertrain options, a gasoline engine and a hybrid version. The standard engine is a 2.0 L turbocharged four-cylinder making 250 hp (190 kW; 250 PS) and 280 lb⋅ft (380 N⋅m; 39 kg⋅m) of torque, which is mounted to an eight-speed automatic transmission (8F35). The hybrid version combines the same engine making 207kW, which is more than the output of gasoline version, with a 140 kW (190 hp; 190 PS) electric motor through a planetary gearset eCVT (HF55) to achieve a total system output of 285 hp (213 kW; 289 PS). All Nautilus models are all-wheel drive and have transverse-mounted engines.

The standard Nautilus achieves 21, 29 and 24 mpg_{‑US} (11.2, 8.1 and 9.8 L/100 km; 25, 35 and 29 mpg_{‑imp}) on the EPA's city, highway, and combined cycles, respectively, while with hybrid power it gets 30, 31 and 30 mpg_{‑US} (7.8, 7.6 and 7.8 L/100 km; 36, 37 and 36 mpg_{‑imp}) on the same rating system.

The suspension consists of a MacPherson strut setup for the front wheels and an independent multilink suspension for the rear, with optional adaptive dampers.

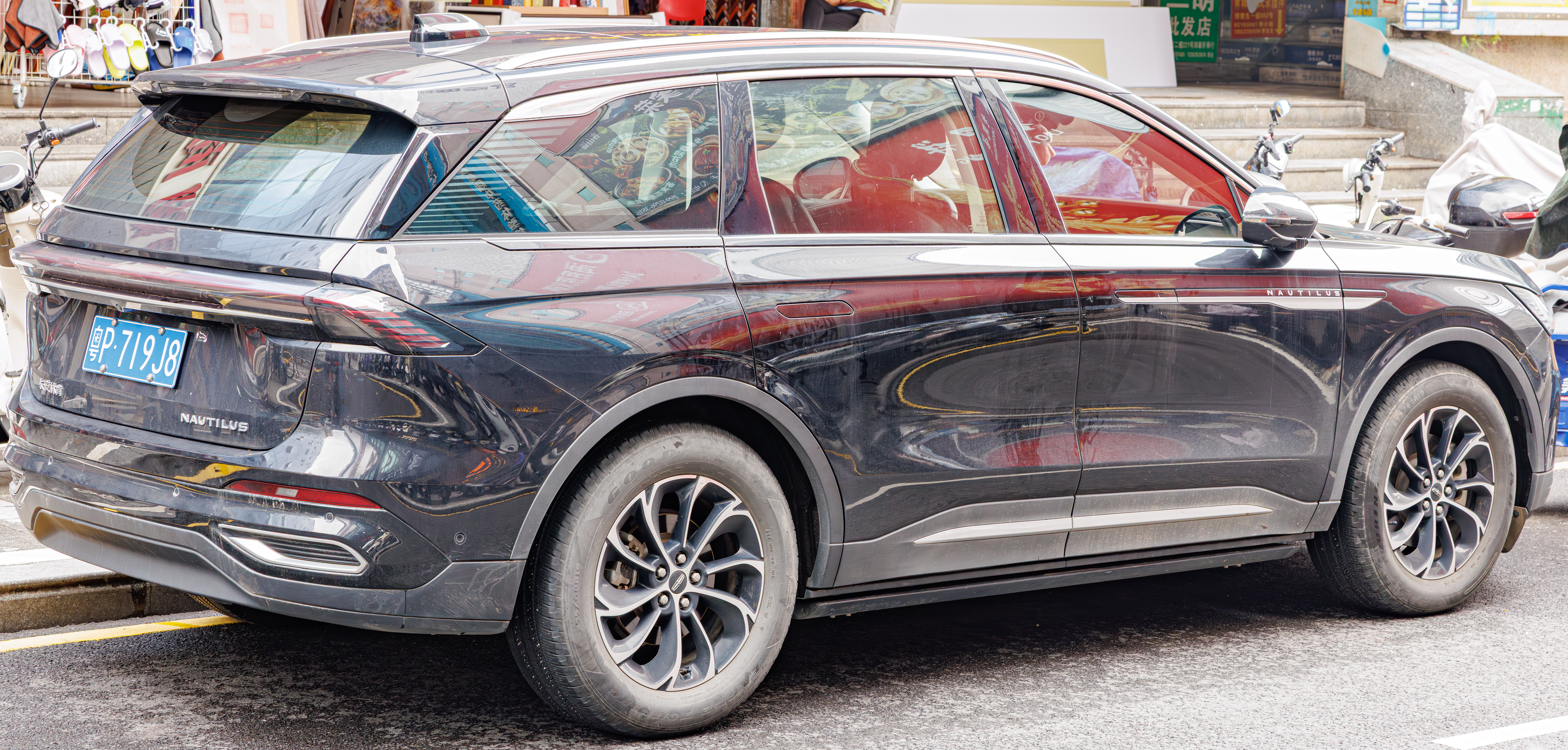
Rear view

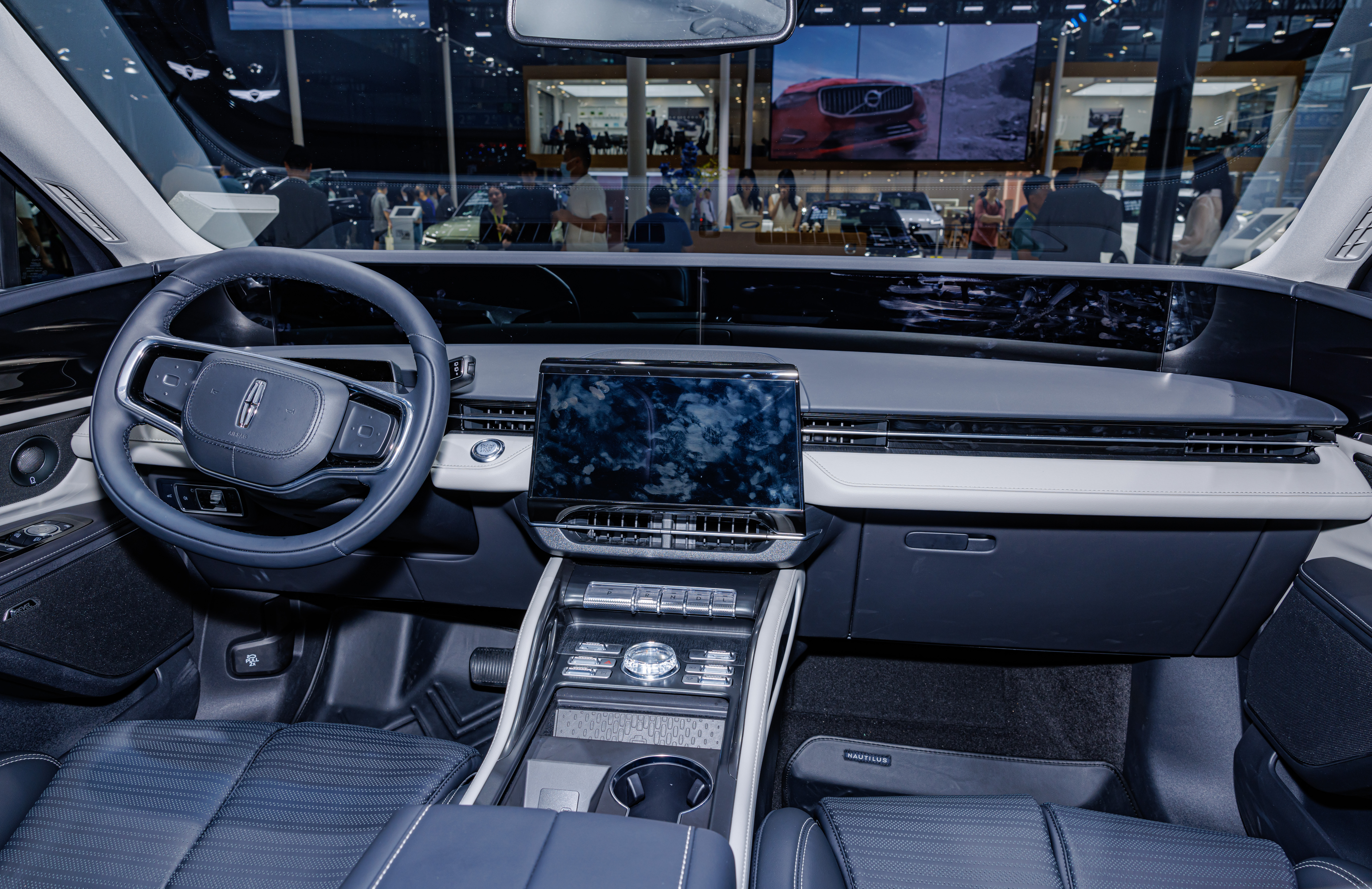
Interior

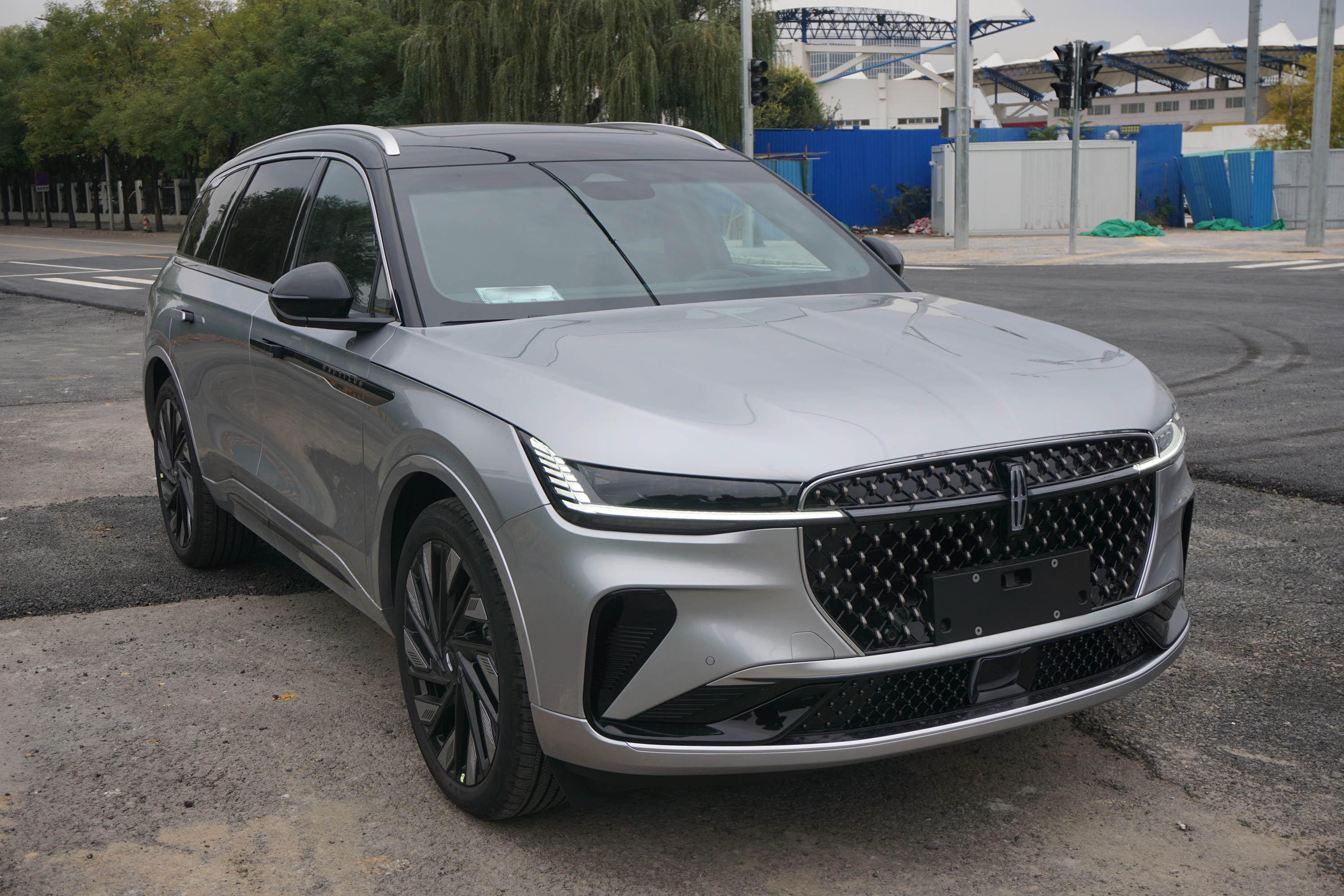
2025 Nautilus President Trim (China)

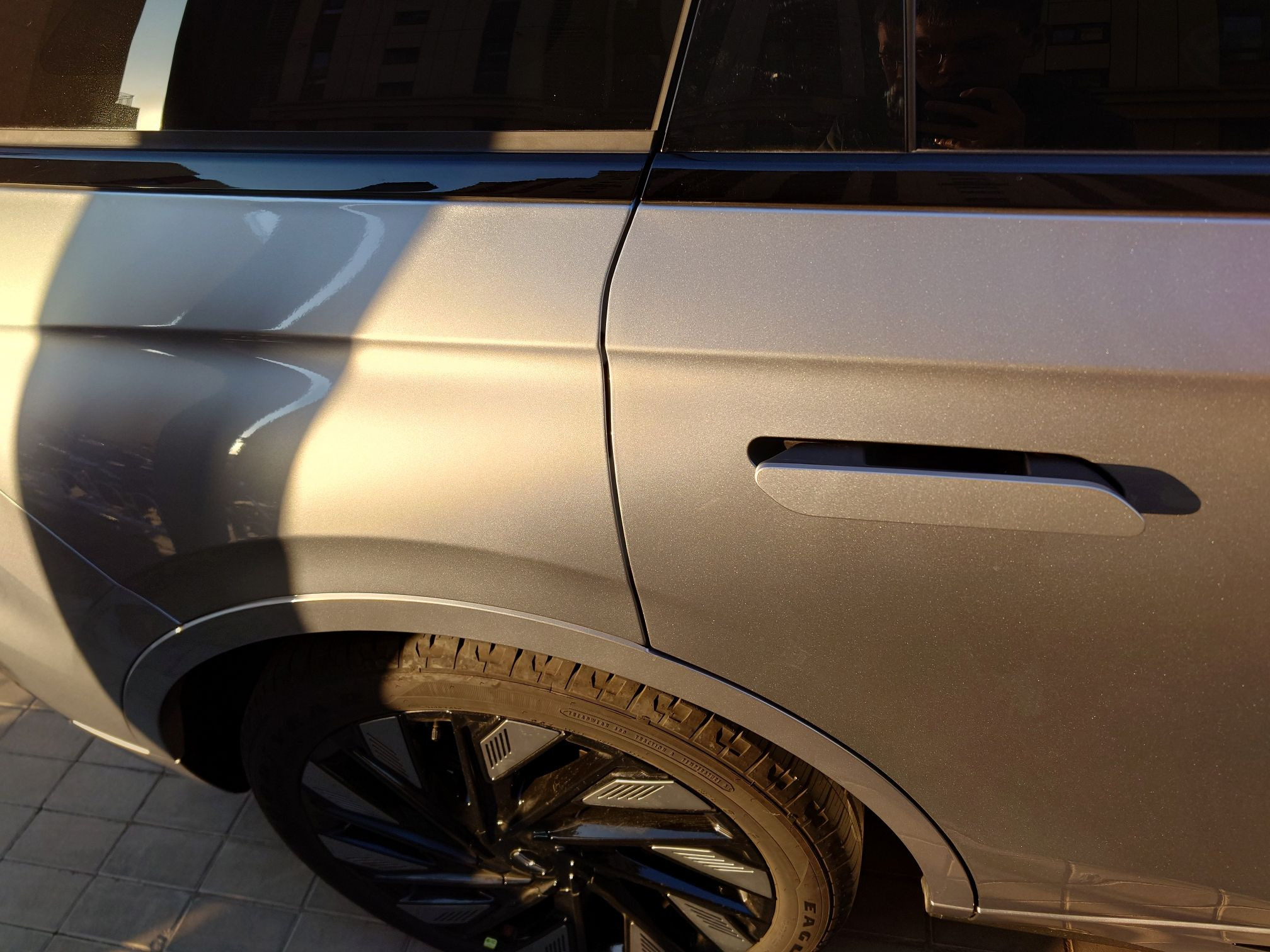
Exterior door handle (China)

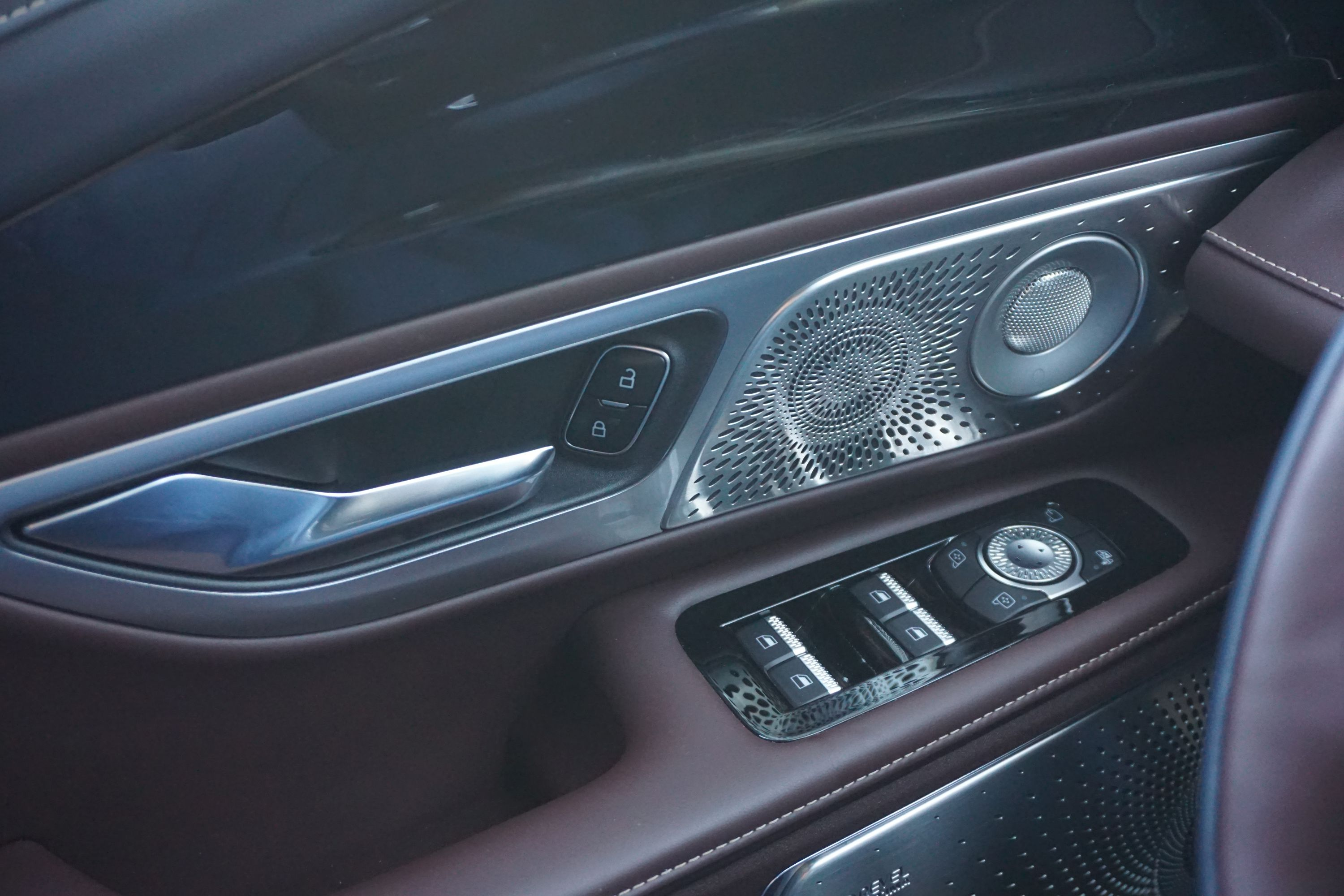
Interior door handle (China)

=== 2027 refresh ===
The facelifted Nautilus debuted on August 13, 2026 for the 2027 model year. Changes made to the exterior include a redesigned front fascia that forgoes the continuous light bar used previously, new wheel options, and a revamped rear light signature consisting of two continuous light bars. New exterior colors and interior themes are also available.

=== Safety ===
The 2024 Nautilus was awarded "Top Safety Pick+" by IIHS.

IIHS scores
Small overlap front	Good
Moderate overlap front (original test)	Good
Moderate overlap front (updated test)	Good
Side (updated test)	Good
Headlights	Good
Front crash prevention: vehicle-to-pedestrian	Good
Seatbelt reminders	Good
Child seat anchors (LATCH) ease of use	Good

C-NCAP (2021) test results 2024 Lincoln Nautilus 2.0T 4WD Premium
Category		%
Overall:	5 /5 stars	87.9%
Occupant protection:		86.51%
Vulnerable road users:		83.71%
Active safety:		93.59%

== Sales ==
Calendar year	U.S.	Canada	China
2018	28,573		12,396
2019	31,711	3,238	14,013
2020	22,742	1,753	8,009
2021	24,443	1,625	27,918
2022	20,635		17,169
2023	23,960		27,409
2024	36,544	3,351	24,496
2025	33,744		14,881
