= Lincoln MKX =

Mid-size crossover SUV

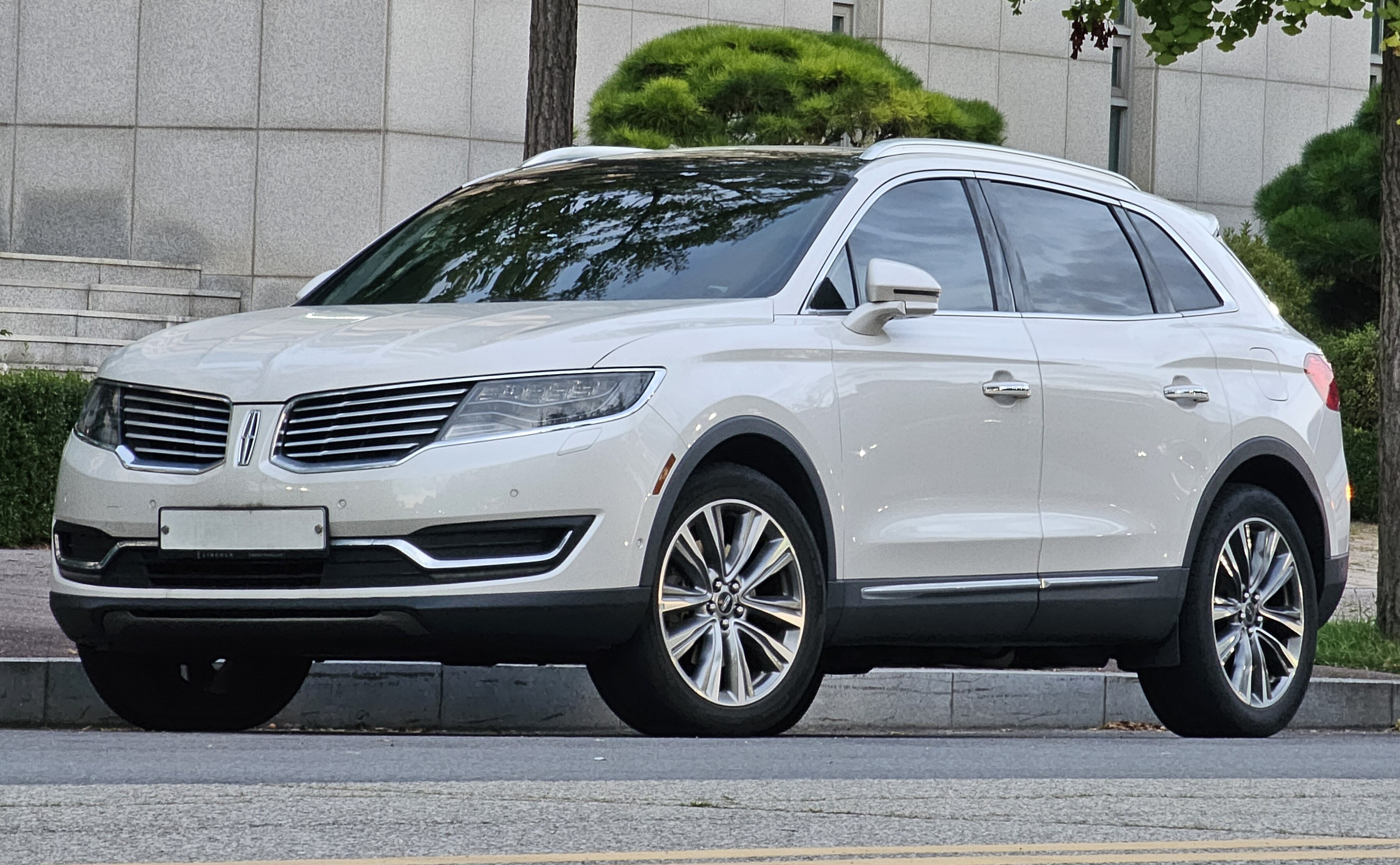

Overview
- Manufacturer: Lincoln (Ford)
- Production: 2006–2019
- Model years: 2007–2018

Body and chassis
- Class: Mid-size luxury crossover SUV
- Body style: 5-door SUV
- Layout: Front-engine, front-wheel-drive or all-wheel-drive
- Related: Ford Edge

Chronology
- Successor: Lincoln Nautilus

The Lincoln MKX is a mid-size luxury crossover SUV manufactured by Ford Motor Company and marketed its Lincoln brand over two generations, as a rebadged variant of the Ford Edge crossover, for both generations.

Introduced in late 2006, the MKX ("X" stands for "crossover") is the first crossover SUV offered by the Lincoln brand. Initially the smallest Lincoln SUV, it was marketed between the Lincoln Corsair and the Lincoln Aviator.

The first-generation MKX was manufactured from 2007 to 2015, based upon the CD3 platform. The second generation is based on the CD4 platform. Both generations of the MKX were manufactured at Oakville Assembly in Oakville, Ontario, Canada alongside the Ford Edge, Ford Flex, and Lincoln MKT.

As Lincoln phased out its use of "MK" model names, the MKX adopted the Lincoln Nautilus nameplate as part of a mid-cycle update in 2018 for the 2019 model year.

== Development ==
Lincoln presented the MKX first as the Lincoln Aviator concept at the 2004 North American International Auto Show as a successor to the first generation Aviator. The concept vehicle was smaller and more car-like with a V6 that was rated at 245 hp (248 PS; 183 kW) and 240 lb⋅ft (325 N⋅m). The Aviator Concept also differed from the production model stylistically and with its panoramic sunroof.

The production model received the MKX nameplate, with Lincoln management suggesting a "mark ex" pronunciation during the 2006 auto show circuit, subsequently changed to the phonetic M-K-X. Due to the similarity of the MKX name to the MDX name used by Acura for their competing luxury crossover, Honda, Acura's parent company, filed a lawsuit against Ford in January 2006, eventually settling the case out of court.

== First generation (U388; 2007) ==
First generation
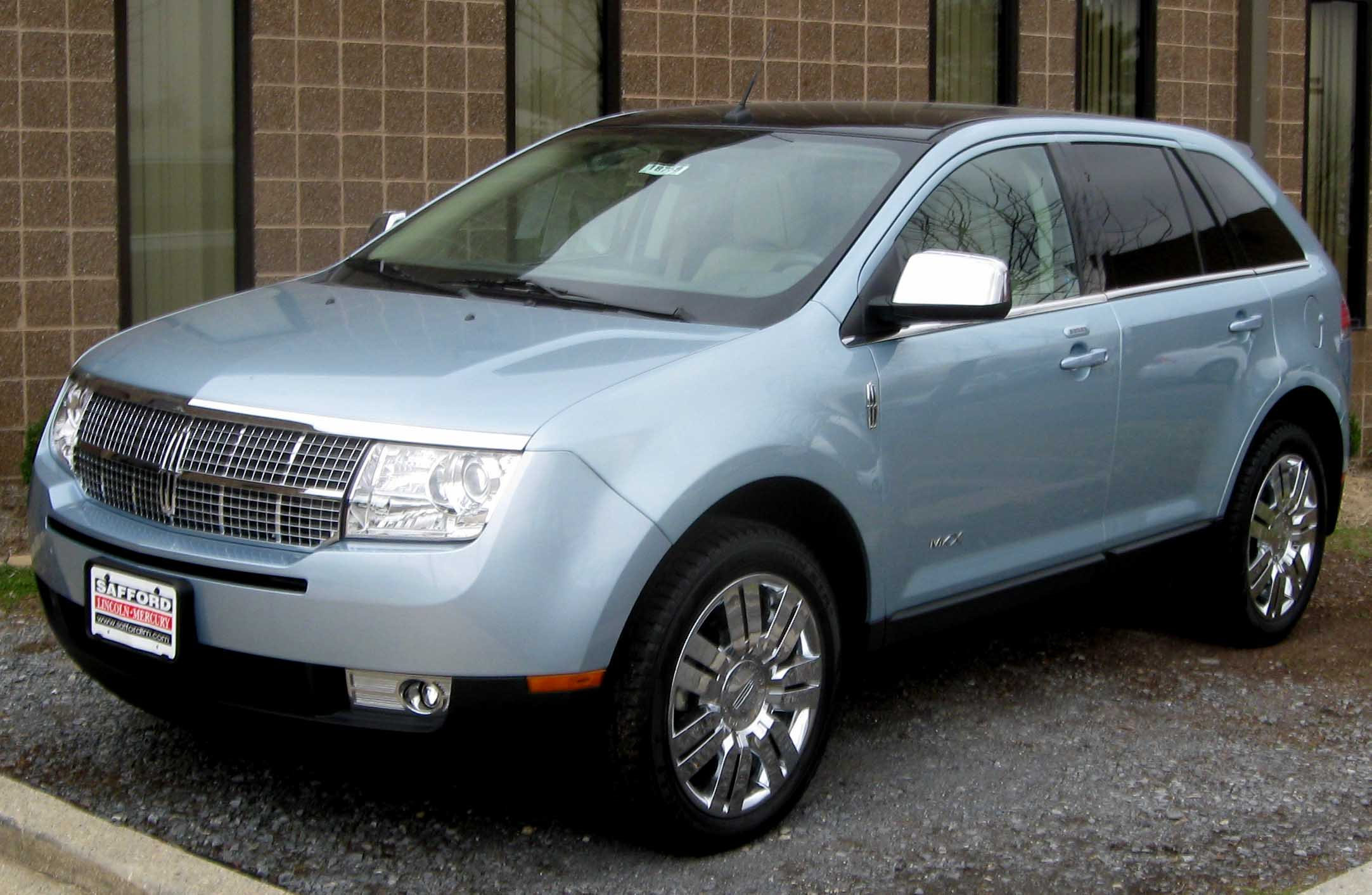
- Pre-facelift Lincoln MKX

Overview
- Model code: U388
- Production: 2006–2015
- Model years: 2007–2015
- Assembly: Canada: Oakville, Ontario (Oakville Assembly)
- Designer: Sid Ramnarace

Body and chassis
- Platform: Ford CD3 platform
- Related: Ford Edge

Powertrain
- Engine: Gasoline: 3.5 L Duratec 35 V6 engine (2007–2010); 3.7 L Duratec 37 V6 engine (2011–2015)
- Transmission: 6-speed 6F automatic

Dimensions
- Wheelbase: 111.2 in (2,824 mm)
- Length: 186.5 in (4,737 mm)
- Width: 75.8 in (1,925 mm) (2007–2010); 76.0 in (1,930 mm) (2011–2015)
- Height: 67.5 in (1,714 mm) (2007); 67.3 in (1,709 mm) (2008–2015)
- Curb weight: 4,220 lb (1,910 kg) (FWD); 4,420 lb (2,000 kg) (AWD)

The 2007 MKX debuted in December 2006 as a rebadged variant of the Ford Edge. In addition to the chrome grille, the MKX's front fascia features projector-beam headlight assemblies with standard chrome-accented fog lights mounted in the lower fascia. The MKX features an optional adaptive headlight system that pivots the aim of the light projectors to match the steering inputs of the driver. In the rear, the MKX features dual chrome exhaust tips and brake lights backlit by LEDs with a light bar that crosses the MKX's liftgate. The optional sunroof, marketed as a Panoramic Vista Roof, is the production version of the glass roof feature shown on the 2004 Aviator Concept. The Vista Roof features a forward power sunroof and a fixed rear moonroof with dual power sunshades.

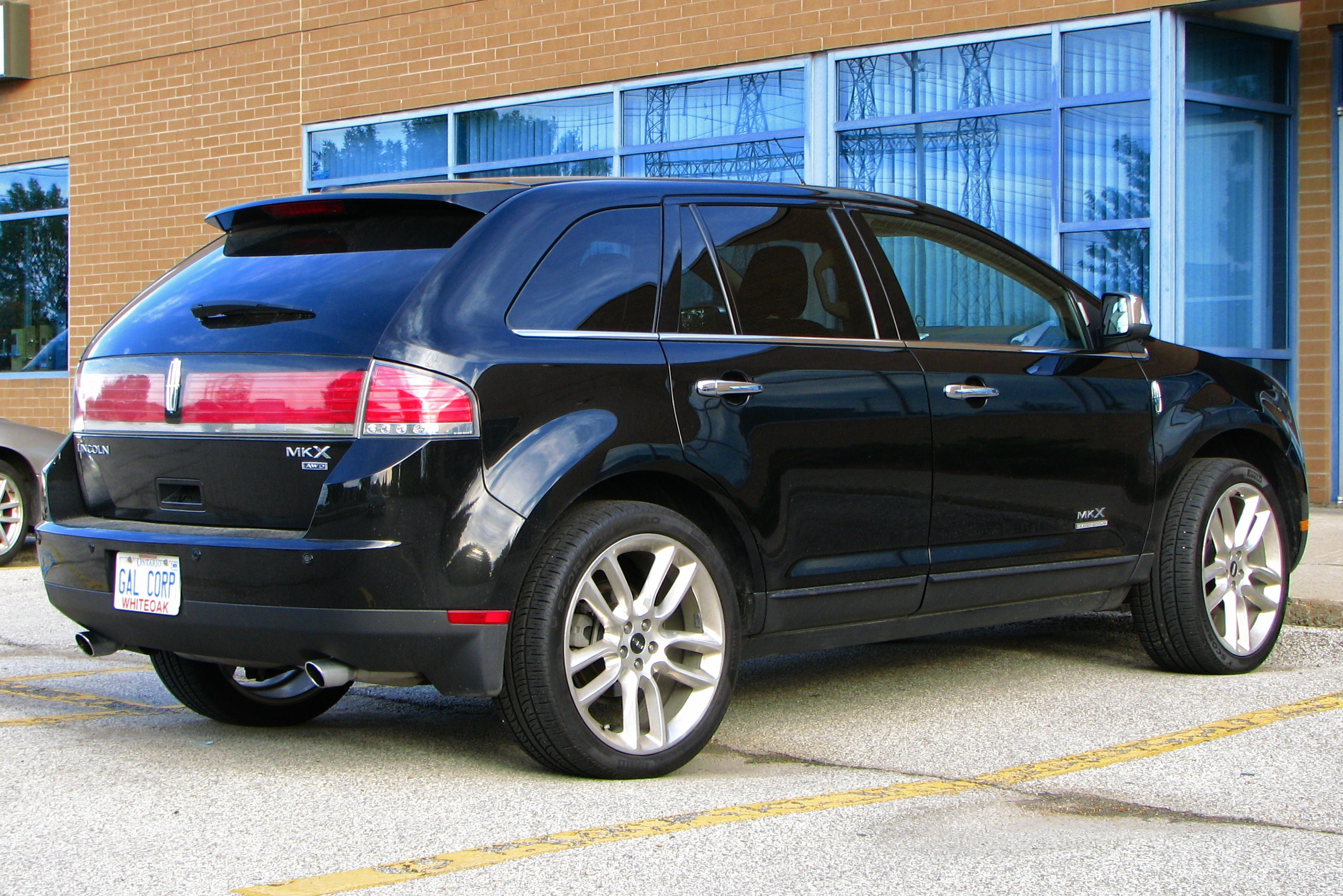
Pre-facelift Lincoln MKX (US)

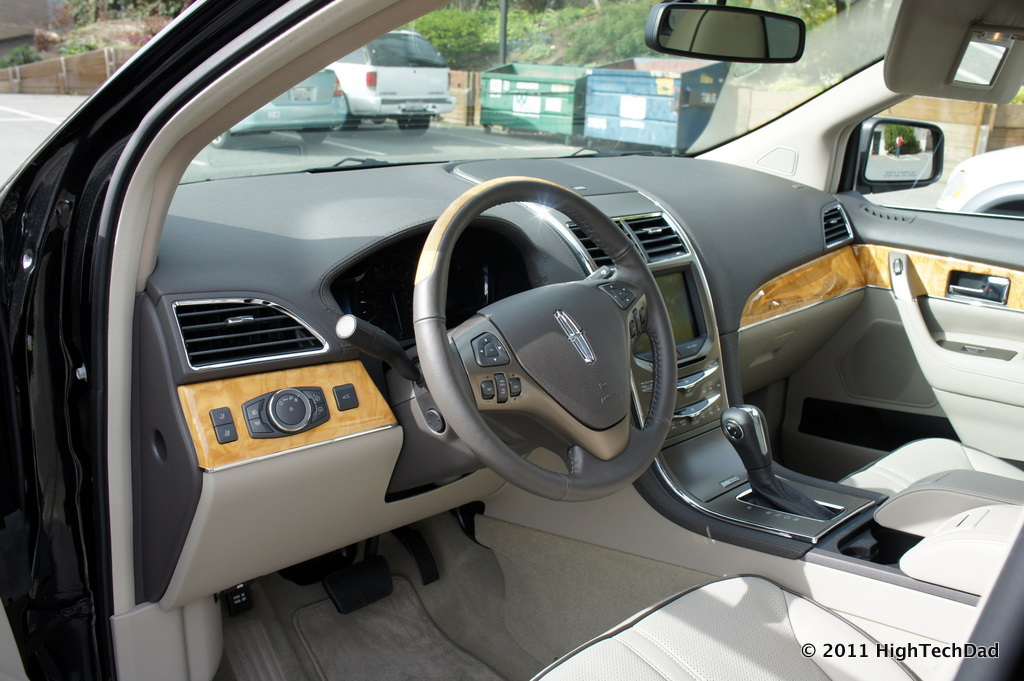
Interior

As a rebadged variant of the Ford Edge, the MKX also shares Ford's CD3 platform, unibody construction, four-wheel independent suspension with a MacPherson strut front suspension with L-shaped lower control arms and a four-link rear suspension with stamped steel control blades and monotube shocks. Both the front and rear suspensions feature an isolated subframe and stabilizer bar. Four-wheel anti-lock disc brakes are standard in all models with Ford's AdvanceTrac traction control system with Roll Stability Control (RSC) optional. Front-wheel drive is standard and all-wheel drive is optional.

The MKX comes with standard 18-inch machined aluminum wheels with 18-inch chrome wheels optional. The sole powertrain in the MKX is an all-aluminum, 3.7-liter Duratec DOHC V6 mated to Ford's 6F50 6-speed automatic transmission. Like the Edge, which shares the powertrain, the MKX's engine produces 265 hp (269 PS; 198 kW) at 6,250 rpm and 250 lb⋅ft (339 N⋅m) of torque at 4,500 rpm; noticeable improvements over what the Aviator Concept's engine was rated at. The MKX, Edge, and Lincoln MKZ were the first recipients of Ford's 3.5-liter Duratec V6. Front-wheel drive versions of the MKX come with a 19 US gal (72 L; 16 imp gal) fuel tank while all-wheel drive models come with a 20 US gal (76 L; 17 imp gal) fuel tank. The MKX has a base curb weight of 4,220 lb (1,910 kg) when front-wheel drive only and 4,420 lb (2,000 kg) when equipped with all-wheel drive.

For 2008 changes for the MKX included Lincoln badges added near the front doors as well as Ford Sync, Limited Edition and Monochromatic Limited Edition packages with unique styling elements and 20-inch chrome wheels, and a voice-activated DVD navigation system. No major changes were made for the 2009 MKX.

=== 2011 refresh ===
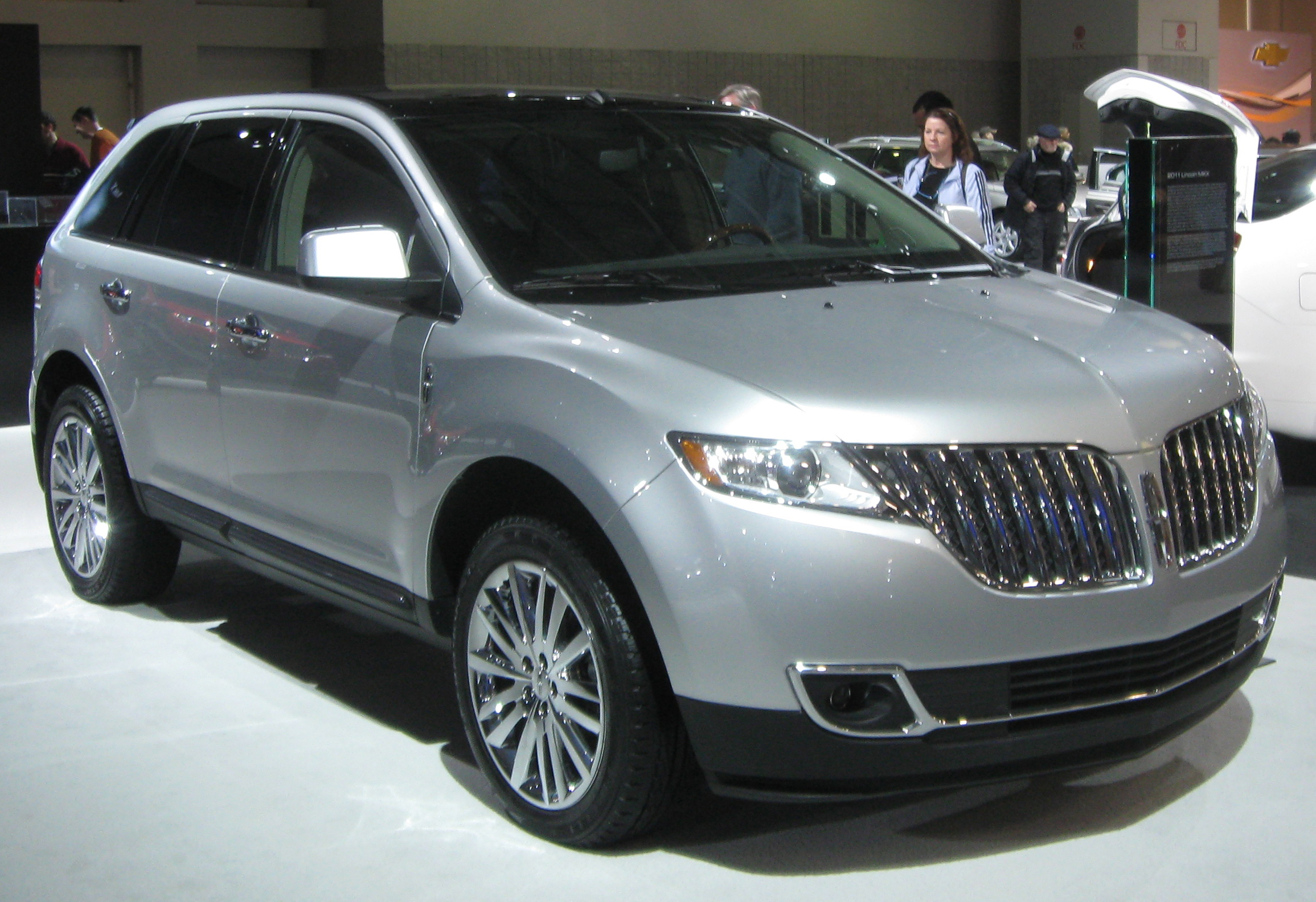
2011–2015 Lincoln MKX

For the 2011 model year, the MKX was refreshed with a new interior, a new front-end resembling the 2010–2012 MKZ, a new rear end and a 3.7-liter DOHC V6 which boosts the MKX's power up to 305 hp (309 PS; 227 kW) and 280 lb⋅ft (380 N⋅m) of torque.

The 2011 MKX featured the first application of the all-new MyLincoln Touch driver connect technology system.

=== Safety ===
2007 Lincoln MKX IIHS Ratings
Category	Rating
Moderate overlap front	Good
Side impact	Good
Roof strength	Acceptable
Head restraints & seats	Good

2011 Lincoln MKX IIHS Ratings
Category	Rating
Moderate overlap front	Good
Side impact	Good
Roof strength	Good
Head restraints & seats	Good

NHTSA crash test ratings (2007):

- Frontal Crash Test – Driver:
- Frontal Crash Test – Passenger:
- Side Impact Rating – Driver:
- Side Impact Rating – Rear Passenger:
- Rollover Rating (AWD): 14.0%
- Rollover Rating (FWD): 15.9%

NHTSA crash test ratings (2012):

- Front Impact Rating:
- Side Impact Rating:
- Rollover Rating (AWD):

== Second generation (U540; 2016) ==
Second generation
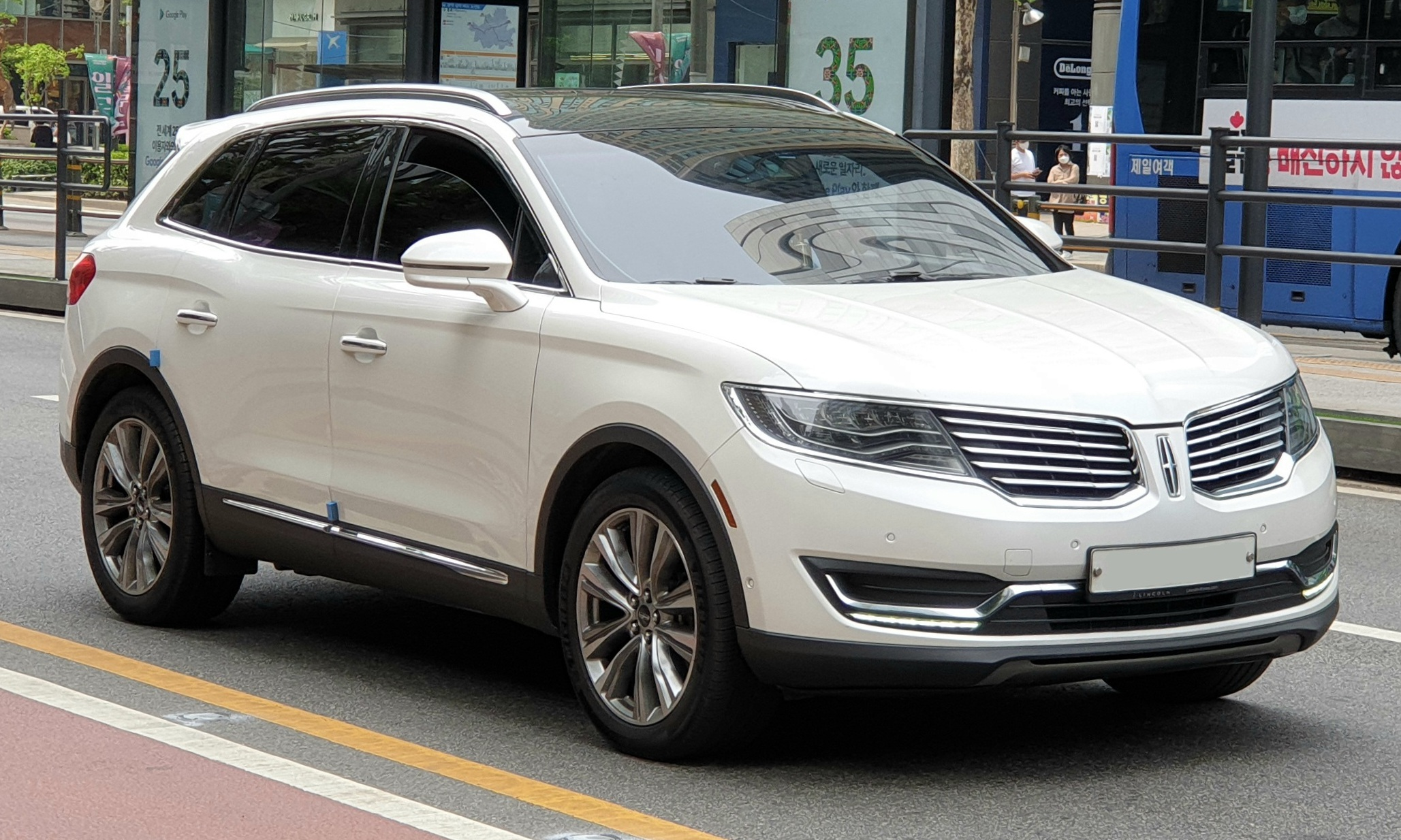

Overview
- Model code: U540
- Also called: Lincoln Nautilus
- Production: 2015–2018
- Model years: 2016–2018
- Assembly: Canada: Oakville, Ontario (Oakville Assembly); China: Hangzhou, Zhejiang (Changan Ford)
- Designer: Andrea di Buduo, John Caswell

Body and chassis
- Platform: Ford CD4 platform
- Related: Ford Edge (second generation); Ford Fusion/Mondeo; Lincoln MKZ (second generation)

Powertrain
- Engine: Gasoline: 2.7 L EcoBoost V6; 3.7 L Cyclone V6
- Transmission: 6-speed 6F automatic

Dimensions
- Wheelbase: 112.2 in (2,850 mm)
- Length: 190.0 in (4,826 mm)
- Width: 76.2 in (1,935 mm)
- Height: 66.2 in (1,681 mm)

The second generation Lincoln MKX was revealed as a concept vehicle at the 2014 Beijing Auto Show. The production model was revealed at the 2015 North American International Auto Show and officially went on sale in the fall of 2015 as a 2016 model.

The Lincoln MKX features bi-xenon HID projector headlights, LED daytime running lights, LED fog lights, LED taillights, or full adaptive LED headlights with LED amber turn signals, LED daytime running lights, LED taillights, and LED fog lights which replaces the standard bi-xenon headlights if the Lincoln MKX is equipped with Luxury Package. The standard engine is the Duratec 3.7-liter V6 rated at 303 hp (307 PS; 226 kW) at 6500 rpm and 278 lb⋅ft (377 N⋅m) at 4000 rpm. The optional engine is the all new Ecoboost V6 that produces 335 hp (340 PS; 250 kW) at 5500 rpm and 380 lb⋅ft (515 N⋅m) at 3000 rpm. Trim levels include Premiere, Select, Reserve and top level Black Label, which is three special appearance packages, a tradition started with the Designer Editions in 1976. The MKX offers the "Thoroughbred" (shared with the MKZ and the Continental), "Modern Heritage", and "Indulgence" theme appearance packages.

The transmission is no longer activated with a center console installed transmission selector; the computer controlled transmission uses buttons installed to the left of the MyLincoln Touch infotainment touch screen labeled "P, R, N, D, S". In the late 1950s a similar feature was offered on all 1957 and 1958 Mercury sedans called Multi-Drive. During the same time, Chrysler offered the push button TorqueFlite and Packard offered the Ultramatic. The "S" transmission selection represents "Sport" mode, where the Continuously Controlled Damping suspension, electric power steering and transmission shift points take on a different posture.

For the 2019 model year, the second-generation MKX underwent a mid-cycle revision that was introduced in November 2017, taking on the Lincoln Nautilus nameplate.

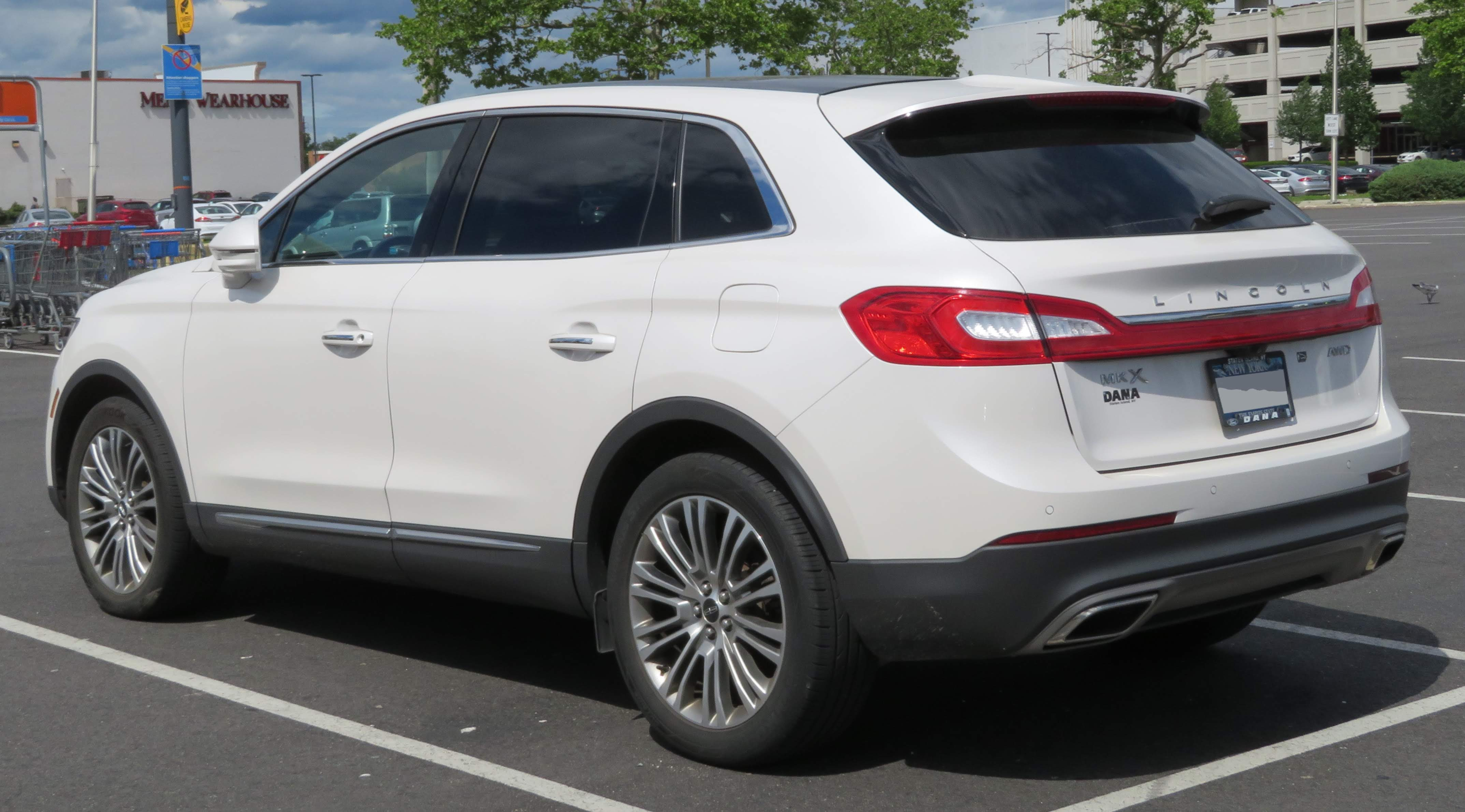
Rear view

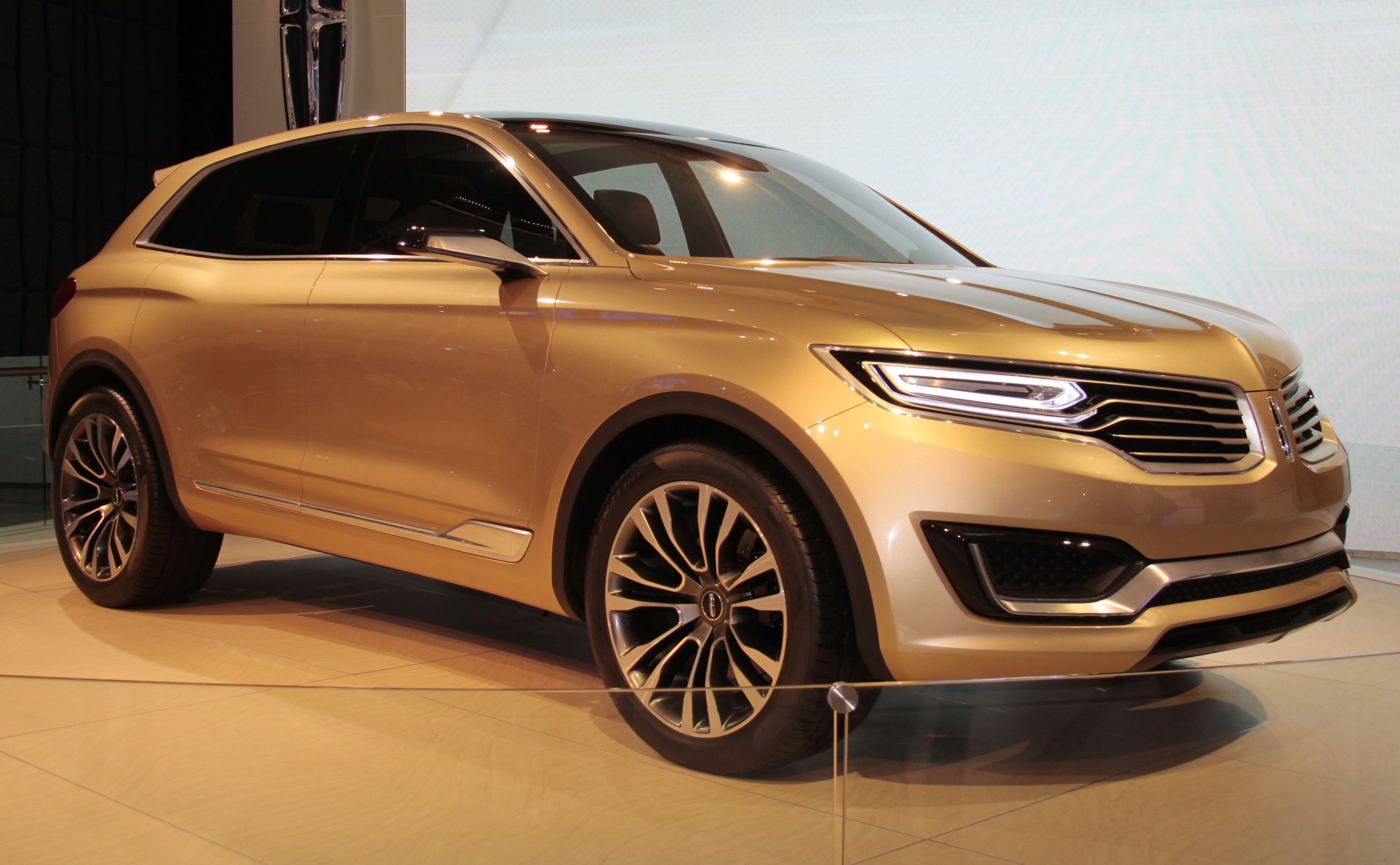
Lincoln MKX concept at the 2014 Beijing Auto Show

== Sales ==
Year	U.S.	China
2006	859	—N/a
2007	37,953	—N/a
2008	29,076	—N/a
2009	21,433	—N/a
2010	21,932	—N/a
2011	23,395	—N/a
2012	25,107	—N/a
2013	23,913	—N/a
2014	23,995	—N/a
2015	22,199	782
2016	30,967	10,407
2017	31,031	11,478
2018	28,573	12,396
2019	31,711	14,013
