= Hybrid Scorecard =

Ranking method for hybrid electric vehicles

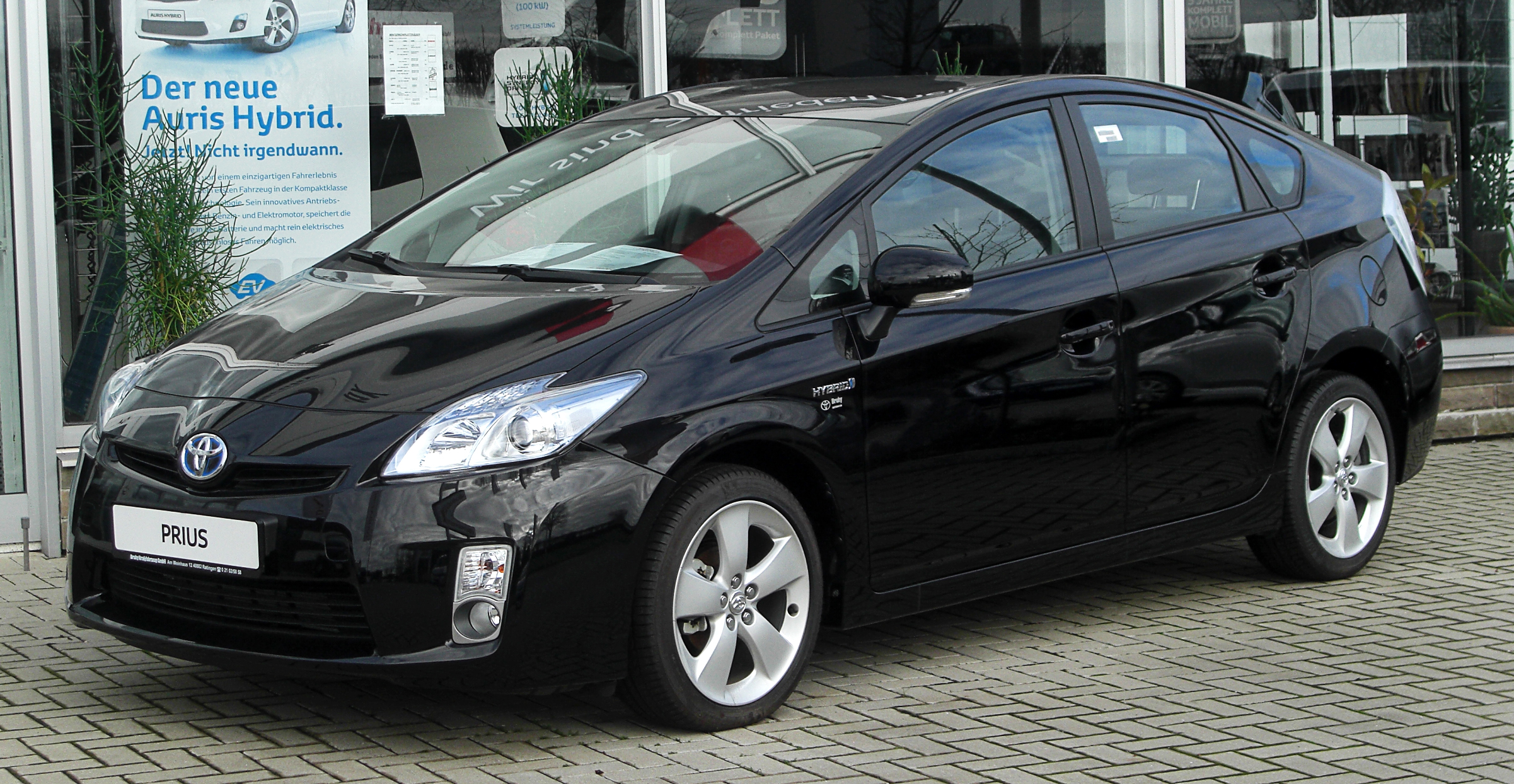
The Toyota Prius ranked in the top of the non-luxury hybrid models in both the 2010 and 2011 Hybrid Scorecards.

The Hybrid Scorecard was created by the Union of Concerned Scientists (UCS) to give consumers a comprehensive comparison of hybrid electric vehicles available in the U.S. market. The UCS Hybrid Scorecard ratings take into consideration fuel economy as rated by the U.S. Environmental Protection Agency (EPA), the environmental benefits as compared to its similar or closest conventional internal combustion engine counterpart, how cost-effectively each hybrid achieves its environmental performance, and premium features that are bundled on a hybrid as standard equipment, which raise its purchase price.

The Hybrid Scorecard was available to the public through the Hybridcenter.org website, created in 2005 by the Union of Concerned Scientists to provide consumer and technology information about hybrid vehicles. The first scorecard was published in January 2010, for 2009–10 model year hybrids. The 2011 Hybrid Scorecard was published in July 2011, and evaluated 34 hybrids from the 2011–12 model years available in the U.S.

The scorecard was retired in 2013 and was replaced in 2015 with an online tool that calculates electric vehicle emissions.

== Variables ==
All hybrid vehicles are grouped into two broad categories, non-luxury and luxury models, and the Hybrid Scorecard score for each hybrid electric vehicle available in the U.S. market is assessed considering the following four variables: combined miles per gallon, environmental improvement score, hybrid value, and forced features.

=== Combined miles per gallon ===
This category considers the combined fuel economy rating for highway/city as estimated by the U.S. EPA and expressed in miles per gallon.

=== Environmental Improvement Score ===
This category measures the smog-forming and global warming pollution performance of a hybrid against its similar or closest conventional gasoline counterpart. Thus, it does not reflect the vehicle's overall greenhouse gas emissions performance relative to the average vehicle.

Global warming emissions reduction

The greenhouse gas emission reductions are calculated as a percent reduction based on the combined city/highway fuel economy ratings for both the hybrid and non-hybrid model according to the ratings published in EPA's fuel economy guide available online at www.fueleconomy.gov. The score is measured on a scale from 0 to 10, where 10 is the best rating. The scores are assigned in relative terms, then a 10 is assigned to the hybrid with the largest reduction in greenhouse gas emissions, while a zero is assigned to the hybrid with the smallest reduction. The values assigned to the models are calculated through linear interpolation between the two end points. For purposes of updating the scorecard, if new hybrid models are introduced during the year, the scale has to be re-calculated to take account of the new arrivals. For the 2011 Scorecard, the Lincoln MKZ Hybrid was rated a 10 while the Volkswagen Touareg Hybrid was rated 0. The Toyota Prius was rated a 9.4.

Particulates and Smog-forming Emissions

Tailpipe emissions are considered through EPA's air pollution score for each hybrid vehicle and not relatively to the improvement over the similar conventional model. Even though EPA rates air pollution scores for both California and federal standards, the Hybrid Scorecard ratings use only the California emissions certification level in order to introduce the maximum potential to reduce tailpipe emissions . The score is measured in a scale from 0 to 10, where 10 is the best rating and 0 is the worst. Then, using the legal definitions established by the California Air Resources Board (CARB), a zero emissions vehicle (ZEV) is assigned a 10, a partial zero emissions vehicle (PZEV) a 9, a super ultra low emission vehicle (SULEV II) an 8, and so forth.

Combined Environmental Improvement Score

The final Environmental Improvement Score is determined through the average (and rounded to the nearest tenth) of the values for global warming emissions reductions and tailpipe emissions. As an example, the 2011 Lincoln MKZ Hybrid achieved a 46% reduction in greenhouse gas emissions compared with its sibling gasoline-only model. Because this is the largest percent reduction achieved among all hybrids the MKZ Hybrid earns a global warming emissions score of 10. As a California certified Partial Zero Emission Vehicle, the MKZ Hybrid earns an EPA air pollution score of 9.0. When both scores are combined, the MKZ Hybrid earns an overall Environmental Improvement Score of 9.5.

Hybrid value rating
Rating category	Incremental cost of global warming emissions reductions (US$/%)
Superior	Less than US$50
Very good	US$50 to US$149.99
Good	US$150 to US$249.99
Poor	US$250 to US$349.99
Very poor	US$350 or more

=== Hybrid value ===
This category measures how cost-effectively a particular hybrid achieves its environmental performance, and the scores vary from "Very Poor" to "Superior." Each hybrid model is evaluated by dividing the estimated cost of hybrid technology used in the vehicle by its reduction in global warming emissions over the conventional model expressed as a percentage. The ratings are assigned to each model based on the resulting incremental cost according to the range values shown in the table in the right. When a hybrid achieves a better smog certification level than its conventional counterpart, the hybrid technology cost should include the cost of any additional emissions controls used in the hybrid model.

=== Forced features ===
This category measures how many premium or upgraded features, called forced features, are included on a hybrid model as standard equipment in comparison to its sibling conventional model. UCS considers that these forced features make it less economical for consumers to buy a base hybrid model. UCS calculates the cost of forced features as the difference in MSRP between the base conventional model, with no upgrades, and the base hybrid model, and then the estimated cost of the hybrid technology is subtracted. This category is scored quantitatively from None to $$$$$. Vehicles with no forced features are assigned a rating of “None” meaning that the additional costs for the vehicle only cover the cost of the hybrid system. Vehicles that have US$6,000 or more of forced features are assigned the maximum of “$$$$$.” The other scores are defined in intermediate ranges of US$1,500.

== 2010 Scorecard ==
The U.C.S. evaluated 31 hybrids from the 2009–10 model years for the 2010 Hybrid Scorecard. The 2010 Toyota Prius scored top marks in the categories regarding environmental benefit and hybrid value. The UCS found that, compared to its closest conventional counterpart the Toyota Matrix, the Prius emits 44% less global warming pollution. The Prius score on forced features was rated relatively good, as the car came with US$1,600 worth of forced features. For the 2010 Hybrid Scorecard the evaluation found that the worst offender was the luxury Lexus LS 600h L hybrid which came with more than US$17,000 in forced features compared with the conventional, base model Lexus LS 460L. The 2010 Scorecard was updated in April 2010 to include new hybrids that have been launched in the U.S. market such as the Mercedes-Benz S400 and the BMW ActiveHybrid X6.

== 2011 Scorecard ==
The 2011 Hybrid Scorecard evaluated 34 hybrids from the 2011–12 model years sold as of April 2011. The 2011 evaluation found that only 13 of the 34 hybrids available in the U.S. market reduce more than 25% of greenhouse emissions compared with their gasoline engine counterparts, but the 2011 scorecard now includes more top performers than it did in 2010.

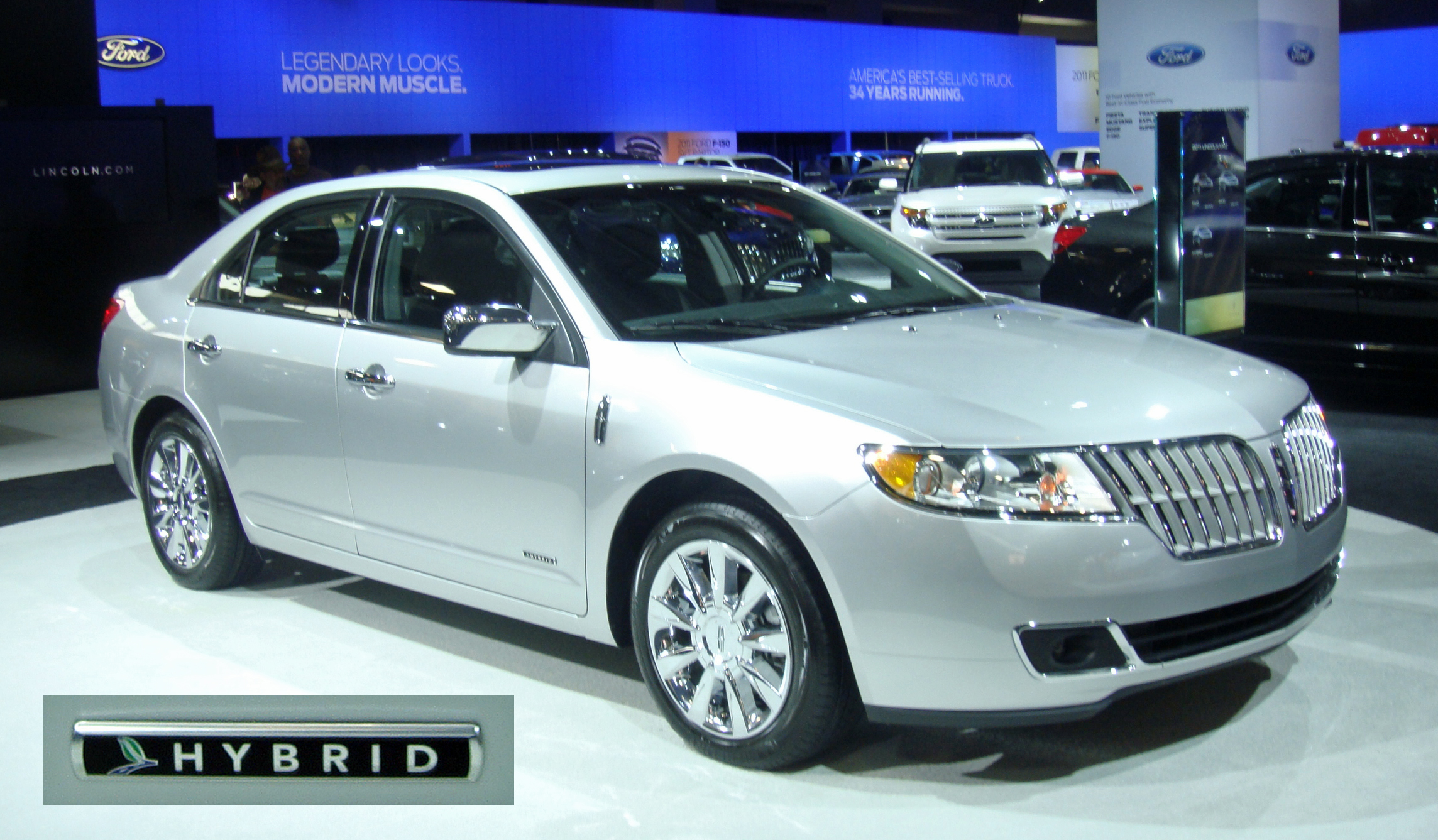
The Lincoln MKZ Hybrid ranked in the top of the luxury models in the 2011 Hybrid Scorecard.

The Toyota Prius remained the top nonluxury model in the environmental improvement category by emitting 40% less greenhouse emissions than comparable nonhybrid models. In the luxury category, two new additions, the Lincoln MKZ Hybrid and the Lexus CT200h accomplished similar performance, an achievement the UCS attributed to their relatively small gasoline engines, as the carmakers downsized these vehicles’ engines from six to four cylinders to maximize fuel economy. The evaluation found that the MKZ Hybrid reduces greenhouse emissions by 46.2% as compared to its sibling gasoline-only MKZ, and the Lexus CT200h a 42.9% reduction.

Besides the Prius, the 2011 evaluation found that more automakers are using hybrid technology to increase fuel efficiency and decrease tailpipe emissions without imposing significant price premiums for those benefits, and other hybrids scoring high on environmental improvement include the Ford Fusion Hybrid, Honda Civic Hybrid, and Toyota Highlander Hybrid. In the non-luxury category, the worst offender is the Volkswagen Touareg Hybrid, which reduces less than a 10% of greenhouse emissions, an all-time low on the scorecard. According to the UCS, the "Touareg was singled out as an example of a "muscle" hybrid that emphasized power over fuel efficiency." The UCS also singled out among the worst-rated hybrids for environmental improvement the new Porsche Cayenne S Hybrid, the BMW Active Hybrid 750i, and the ActiveHybrid X6.

Hybrid Scorecard for non-luxury models available in the U.S.
(model year 2011–2012)

Hybrid vehicle	EPA combined miles per gallon	Environmental improvement score	Hybrid value	Forced features
Toyota Prius	50	9.2	Very good	None
Honda Civic Hybrid	41	7.2	Very good	$$$
Honda Insight	41	6.5	Good	None
Ford Fusion Hybrid	39	7.8	Very good	$$$
Hyundai Sonata Hybrid	37	6.8	Good	None
Honda CR-Z	37	6.2	Very good	$$
Toyota Camry Hybrid	33	6.1	Good	$
Nissan Altima Hybrid	33	5.7	Good	$$
Ford Escape Hybrid FWD	32	7.0	Good	$$
Ford Escape Hybrid 4WD	29	6.5	Good	$$
Toyota Highlander Hybrid	28	7.1	Good	$$
Chevrolet Tahoe Hybrid 2WD	21	4.3	Poor	$$$$$
GMC Yukon Hybrid 2WD	21	4.3	Poor	$$$$$
Chevrolet Silverado Hybrid 4WD	21	4.3	Good	None
GMC Sierra Hybrid 4WD	21	4.3	Poor	$
Chevrolet Tahoe Hybrid 4WD	21	4.3	Poor	$$$$$
GMC Yukon Hybrid 4WD	21	4.3	Poor	$$$$$
Chevrolet Silverado Hybrid 2WD	21	3.7	Very poor	None
GMC Sierra Hybrid 2WD	21	3.7	Poor	$
Volkswagen Touareg Hybrid	21	3.0	Very poor	$$$$$

Hybrid Scorecard for luxury models available in the U.S.
(model year 2011–2012)

Hybrid vehicle	EPA combined miles per gallon	Environmental improvement score	Hybrid value	Forced features
Lexus CT 200h	42	8.6	Superior	None
Lincoln MKZ Hybrid	39	9.5	Superior	None
Lexus HS 250h	35	7.0	Very good	None
Lexus RX 450h FWD	30	6.8	Good	$
Lexus RX 450h AWD	29	6.9	Good	$
Infiniti M35h	29	5.5	Good	None
Lexus GS 450h	23	4.5	Good	$
Mercedes-Benz S400	21	5.2	Superior	None
Cadillac Escalade Hybrid 4WD	21	5.6	Very good	$$$$$
Cadillac Escalade Hybrid 2WD	21	5.0	Very good	$$$$$
Porsche Cayenne S Hybrid	21	3.7	Good	None
Lexus LS 600h L	20	4.1	Very poor	$$$$$
BMW Active Hybrid 750i	20	3.7	Very poor	$$
BMW ActiveHybrid X6	18	3.2	Very poor	$$$$$

The UCS explained that the Chevrolet Volt plug-in hybrid (PHEV) was not included in the evaluation even though the Volt could have been compared with the Chevrolet Cruze as the conventional similar. The reason for the exclusion is that PHEVs are affected by a variety of factors that affect their environmental performance, such as the type of fuel used (coal, wind, solar, etc.) for generating electricity to charge the vehicle, and also by the driving habits, including how often the vehicle is plugged in and the number of miles driven on electricity-only mode.

== See also ==
- Government incentives for fuel efficient vehicles in the United States
- Green vehicle
- Hybrid electric vehicle
- Hybrid electric vehicles in the United States
- List of hybrid vehicles
