= Lincoln MKZ =

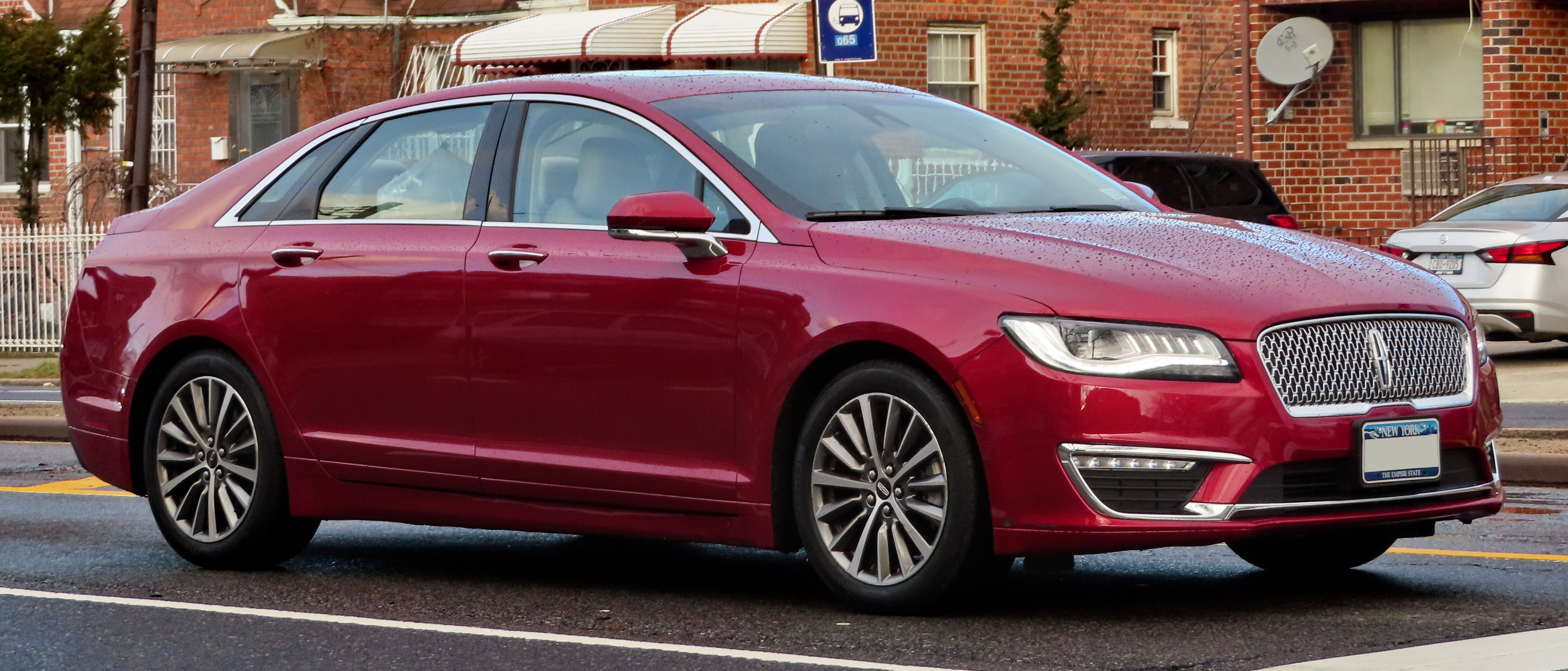
- 2018 Lincoln MKZ

Overview
- Manufacturer: Ford Motor Company
- Also called: Lincoln Zephyr (2006)
- Production: August 2005 – July 2020
- Model years: 2006–2020
- Assembly: Mexico: Hermosillo, Sonora (Hermosillo Stamping & Assembly)
- Designer: Darrell Behmer, Chief Designer (Fusion, Milan and MKZ)

Body and chassis
- Class: Mid-size luxury car
- Body style: 4-door sedan
- Layout: Front-engine, front-wheel-drive; Front-engine, all-wheel-drive

Chronology
- Successor: Lincoln Z (China)

The Lincoln MKZ is a mid-size, four-door, five-passenger, front- or all-wheel drive luxury sedan manufactured by Ford and marketed by its Lincoln brand across two generations in North America and China (2015–2020). Co-developed with the Ford Fusion and Mercury Milan, the MKZ was available with either gasoline or gasoline-electric hybrid powertrains.

The first generation was styled under Chief Designer Darrell Behmer and launched for the 2006 model year as the Zephyr, and from the 2007 model year onwards as the MKZ with a mid-cycle refresh for 2010. The MKZ Hybrid, Lincoln's first, was introduced for 2011. The second generation MKZ was marketed for 2013 to 2020 in gasoline and hybrid configurations, with a mid-cycle refresh for 2017.

The MKZ was manufactured exclusively at Ford's Mexican Hermosillo Stamping and Assembly plant, with production commencing in August 2005 and ending in 2020.

Ford had previously used the Zephyr nameplate (after Zephyrus, the Greek personification of the west wind) both in the late 1930s for a line of mid-size vehicles, as well as in the late 1970s and early 1980s for the Mercury Zephyr.

== First generation (2006) ==
First generation
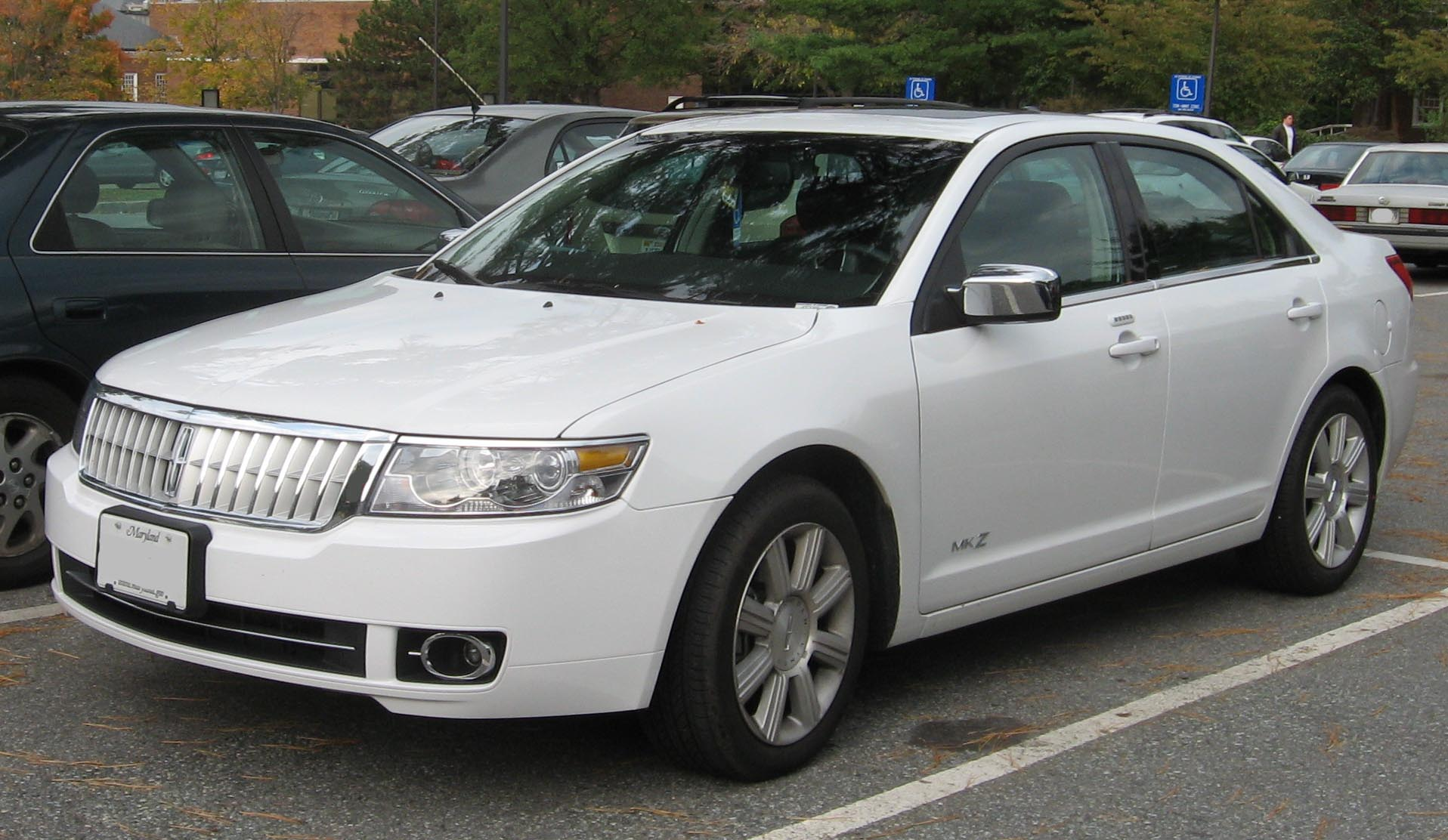
- 2007 Lincoln MKZ

Overview
- Also called: Lincoln Zephyr (2005–2006)
- Production: August 1, 2005–2012
- Model years: 2006–2012

Body and chassis
- Platform: Ford CD3 platform (CD378)
- Related: Ford Fusion; Mercury Milan

Powertrain
- Engine: Gasoline: 3.0 L Duratec 30 V6 ('06); 3.5 L Duratec 35 V6 ('07-'12); Gasoline Hybrid: 2.5 L Duratec 25 I4 (Hybrid; '11-'12)
- Transmission: 6-speed Aisin TF-80 automatic

Dimensions
- Wheelbase: 107.4 in (2,728 mm)
- Length: 2006–09 190.5 in (4,839 mm); 2010–12: 189.8 in (4,821 mm)
- Width: 72.2 in (1,834 mm)
- Height: 2006: 57.2 in (1,453 mm); 2007–09: 57.1 in (1,450 mm); 2010–12: 56.9 in (1,445 mm); 2011–12 Hybrid: 56.8 in (1,443 mm)
- Curb weight: 2006: 3,438 lb (1,559 kg); 2007–09: 3,469 lb (1,574 kg); 2010–12: 3,598 lb (1,632 kg); 2011–12 Hybrid: 3,756 lb (1,704 kg)

Lincoln presented the 2006 Zephyr in concept form at the 2004 New York International Auto Show, featuring Lincoln's signature split-wing/waterfall grille and quad projector beam headlights. Chrome trim extended along the Zephyr's beltline while the car's rear fascia featured LED taillights and dual chrome exhaust tips.

Lincoln introduced the production Zephyr in the fall of 2005 for the 2006 model year, sharing Ford's CD3 platform with rebadged Ford Fusion, Mercury Milan and Mazda 6. The Zephyr's powertrain was a 3.0 L DOHC Duratec V6 with an Aisin 6-speed automatic transmission. Featuring an instrument panel unique to the Lincoln along with other details, the 2006 Zephyr started at a base MSRP of $28,995 USD, ranging up to $35,340 USD.

Though slightly smaller and front-wheel drive, the Zephyr was marketed as a replacement for Lincoln's previous entry-level mid-size model, the rear-wheel drive Lincoln LS. To facilitate a smooth transition, the Zephyr and LS were sold parallel with each other during the 2006 model year, the first model year of the Zephyr and the last for the LS. For 2007, the model was renamed MKZ, and took over the LS' market with sales beginning in September 2006. Lincoln had previously used the Zephyr nameplate for a smaller car competing with the Packard One-Twenty, and the LaSalle, a smaller Cadillac.

The Zephyr featured interior detailing and an instrument panel distinct from the Fusion and Milan, using genuine ebony or maple wood inserts along with chrome-bezeled gauges, circular, chrome-finished vents and a satin-nickel center stack with the radio and climate controls. The steering wheel was leather-wrapped with genuine wood grips and satin-nickel audio, climate, and cruise control buttons. White LED backlighting was used for the Zephyr's controls and instrumentation. Leather seating surfaces were standard in all models.

Other standard features included cruise control, automatic headlights, fog lights, power door locks, "global" power windows (all windows can lower simultaneously at the push of a button), power adjustable and heated mirrors with puddle lamps, remote keyless entry, a tilt and telescoping steering wheel with redundant audio and climate controls, dual-zone automatic climate control, a universal garage door opener, 10-way power driver and front passenger seats, rear-seat reading lamps, and a six-speaker audio system with an AM/FM stereo radio and a six-disc, MP3-compatible CD changer. Optional in the Zephyr was a power moonroof, a DVD-based satellite navigation system and HID headlights. All Zephyrs featured low-profile tires on 17x7.5-inch wheels with painted aluminum versions standard and chrome versions optional. HID headlights were available.

Safety features included standard dual front-side airbags, front seat-deployed side airbags, and curtain airbags that extend from the front to rear seats.

Beginning with the Zephyr, Lincoln offered and an industry-first THX II-Certified audio system with a six-disc, MP3-compatible CD changer and ten speakers and digital signal processing. For the 2007 MKZ, Lincoln subsequently expanded the THX specifications to include THX II Premium Certified Audio System, 5.1 Surround Sound, 12-channel amplifier, 600 watt power, and 14 speakers, the latter with two subwoofers and a center channel speaker array with THX Slot Speaker(TM) technology. The system included a 10 GB hard drive marketed as a jukebox, that could hold up to 2,400 tracks.

Lincoln offered the Zephyr with standard heated seats and optional and cooled front seats. With the 2008 MKZ, the climate controlled front seats, heated and cooled, became standard equipment, pioneered in the 2000 Lincoln Navigator and provided by Amerigon. User-controlled by dash-mounted switches, ambient cabin air was drawn into the system, either heated or cooled by a solid-state heat pump using a thermo-electric device (TED) and then circulated via a fan through seat cushion and seat back ducts.

Co-developed withe the Fusion and Milan, the Zephyr used Ford's CD3 platform, itself derived from the natively front-wheel drive (FWD) Mazda 6, employing a coil-over damper, short- and long-arm (SLA) front suspension with double-ball-joint control arms and independent multi-link rear suspension with lower control arms and a 17 mm (0.7 in) stabilizer bar. Spring rates, bushings, and dampers were specially tuned for the Zephyr to provide excellent ride comfort without compromising handling. The Zephyr featured standard four-wheel anti-lock disc brakes with traction control. The sole engine was an all-aluminum 3.0 L DOHC Duratec V6 producing 221 hp (165 kW) at 6250 rpm and 205 lb·ft (278 N·m) of torque at 4800 rpm. This engine was mated to an Aisin 6-speed automatic transmission and had a final drive ratio of 3.46:1. This powertrain was identical to the V6 powertrain available in the Fusion and Milan from 2006 to 2009. With this powertrain the Zephyr could accelerate from zero to 60 mph (97 km/h) in 7.5 seconds. The FWD Zephyr came with a 17.5 US gal (66 L; 15 imp gal) fuel tank and is rated to deliver 17 mpg_{‑US} (14 L/100 km; 20 mpg_{‑imp}) in city driving and 26 mpg_{‑US} (9.0 L/100 km; 31 mpg_{‑imp}) on the highway based on the revised 2008 EPA fuel efficiency measurement standards.

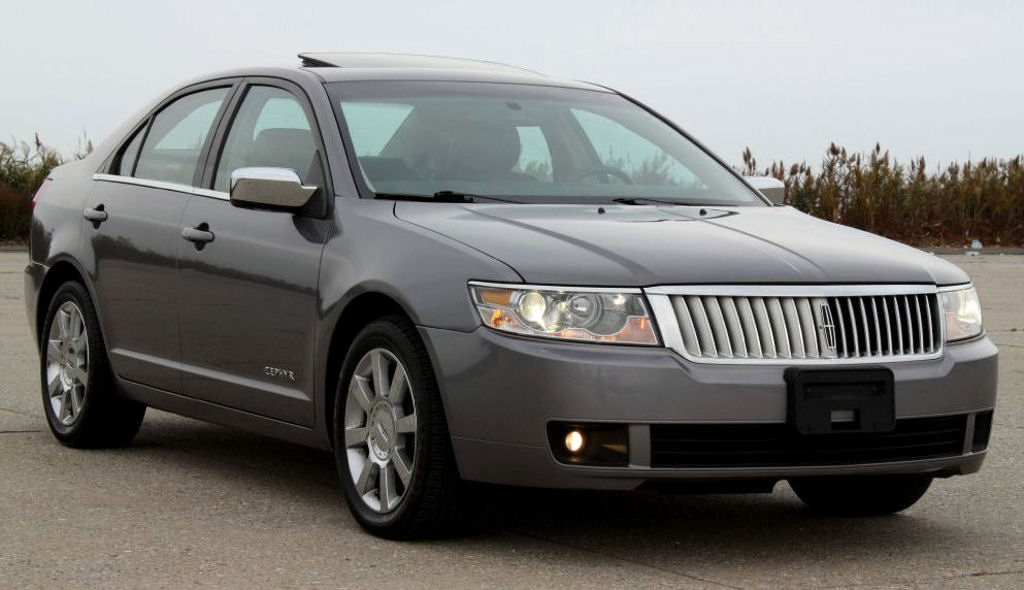
2006 Lincoln Zephyr

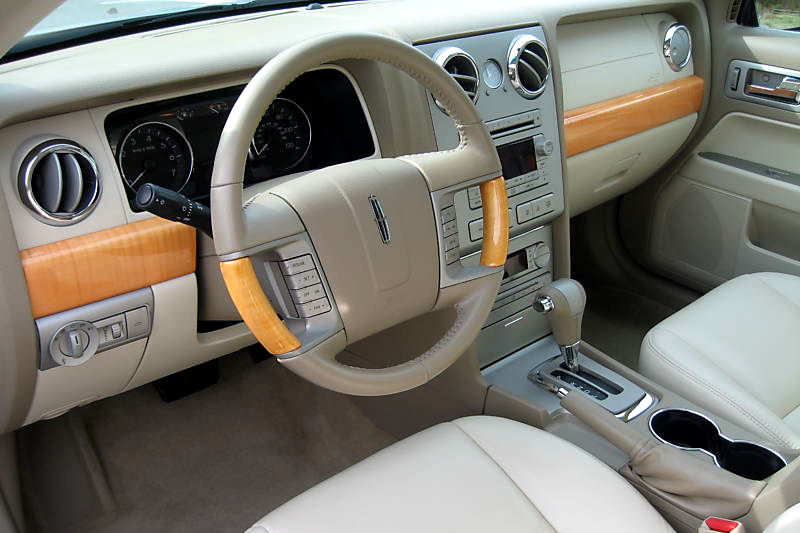
Front interior area of a 2006 Lincoln Zephyr

=== Zephyr to MKZ transition (2007) ===
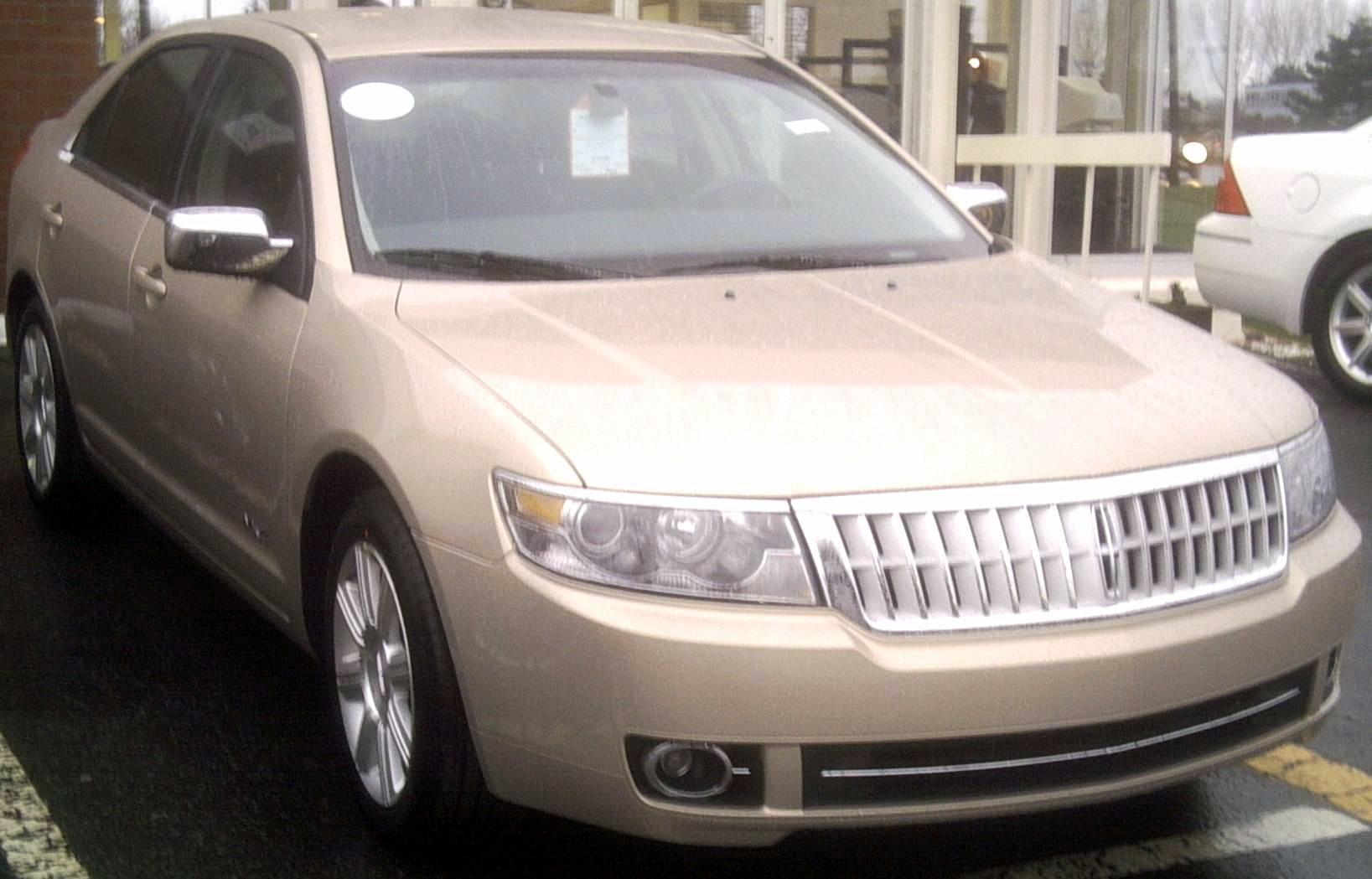
2007–2009 Lincoln MKZ

For 2007, Lincoln reintroduced the Zephyr as the MKZ as its new name, following a broad market trend toward alphanumeric nameplates, across its model range. At its 2006 introduction, Lincoln originally suggested pronunciation of the nameplate MKZ as "mark-zee," subsequently shifting to "em-kay-zee" ("em-kay-zedd" in Europe) after noticing focus groups and dealership personnel naturally using the latter pronunciation.

The 2007 MKZ was presented at the Chicago Auto Show in February 2006. Revisions included optional all-wheel-drive along with Ford's then-new all-aluminum 3.5-L DOHC Duratec 35 V6, tuned to produce 265 hp (196 kW) at 6250 rpm and 249 lb·ft (337 N·m) of torque at 4500 rpm — using regular-grade gasoline. and achieving 17 mpg_{‑US} (14 L/100 km; 20 mpg_{‑imp}) in city driving and 25 mpg_{‑US} (9.4 L/100 km; 30 mpg_{‑imp}) on the highway in front-wheel-drive models. Revised Standard and optional variants of the MKZ's 17 × 7.5-inch wheels were offered.

For 2008, the MKZ received as standard equipment Sirius satellite radio, perforated leather seats, a reverse sensing system, a tire pressure-monitoring system, and Lincoln SYNC (late availability). For 2009, Ford's 'AdvanceTrac' stability control system became standard, while a special edition "Midnight Black" package was available, featuring black leather seating surfaces and panels contrasted with real maple wood and satin nickel inserts.

A road test by Motor Trend found that an MKZ equipped with all-wheel-drive could accelerate from zero to 60 mph (97 km/h) in 6.8 seconds and complete a quarter mile in 15.2 seconds at 93.4 mph (150.3 km/h) due to the more powerful engine and extra traction. The available THX II-certified audio system offered an speaker count increased to 14 and its peak output to 600 watts. The MKZ remained positioned as an entry-level luxury sedan with models priced from just under US$30,000 to fully optioned models remaining below $40,000.

=== Facelift (2010) ===
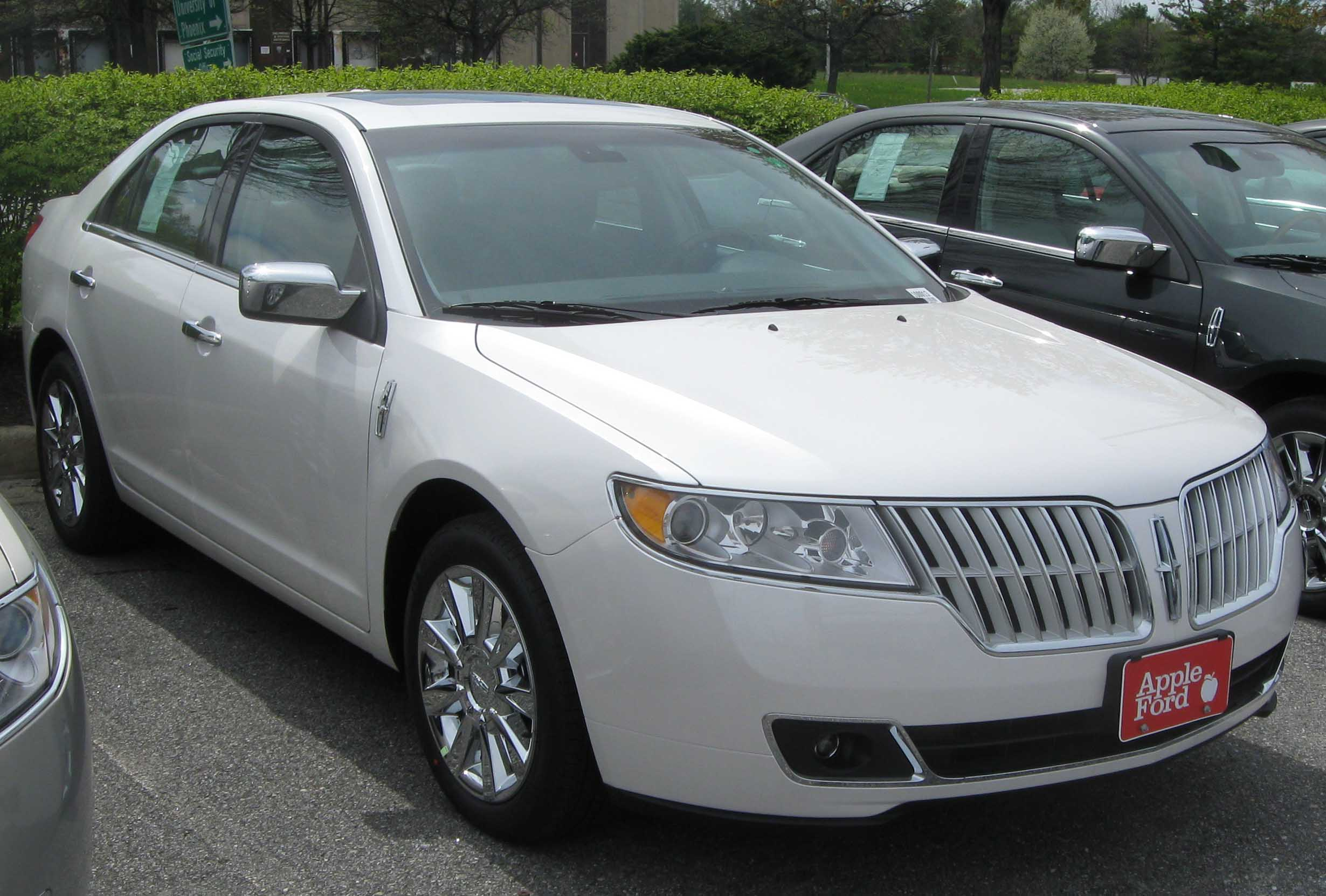
2010 Lincoln MKZ

Lincoln presented the 2010 MKZ at the 2008 Los Angeles International Auto Show, with either a gasoline or hybrid powertrain — styled under Chief Designer Derryl Behmer and Design Director Peter Horbury — and released in the spring of 2009.

In addition to substantial underbody work, exterior changes included a more pronounced "split wing" (aka Bow Wave) grille, larger LED taillights, revised trunk lid, and standard restyled 17-inch wheels. Interior revisions included a new instrument cluster, center stack, door trim, as well as updated colors, materials and finishes — including genuine wood accents in ash or swirled walnut, as well as standard Bridge of Weir leather.

Other features new for 2010 included a reverse camera system, rain-sensing windshield wipers, cabin air filter, adaptive HID headlights, capless fuel filler marketed as Easy Fuel, new center stack with high-mounted GPS system, and a radar-controlled blind spot monitor (marketed as BLIS) that incorporates a system to alert users to traffic approaching laterally on backing out of a parking spot (marketed as Cross Traffic Alert).

Mechanically, the MKZ featured suspension revised to improve ride quality and handling and a new 'SelectShift' six-speed automatic transmission. The output of the 3.5L V6 remained the same, and changes to the six-speed automatic reduced shift times and improved acceleration.

Beginning with the 2010 model year, the MKZ (along with badge-engineered variants, the Ford Fusion and the Mercury Milan — and their hybrid variants) used an acoustic glass for the front windscreen and backlight. Marketed as Carlite SoundScreen, the glass used a sheet of acoustic polyvinyl butyral (PVB) between two layers of glass to reduce noise levels by as much as 6 dB at certain frequencies and 2 to 3 dB overall, enabling more intelligible in-car conversation. The acoustic layer could save up to seven pounds per vehicle, and helped cut vibration noise from the vehicle's engine compartment. For the MKZ, new acoustic improvements included thicker acoustic window glass, enhanced door/body seals, absorption padding in the fenders and pillars, constrained-layer damping on the entire floor, acoustic headliner, thicker rear backlight and a retuned air induction system. Lincoln marketed the acoustic package as its Quietcraft interior.

Lincoln continued to offer a DVD-based satellite navigation head unit updated to accept voice commands, along with Sirius satellite radio, and Sirius Travel Link. For 2011, an expanded the THX/navigation specification included HD Radio with simulcasts as well as DTS Neural Surround, adding multi-channel Surround sound to digital music (e.g., from HD Radio, CDs, mobile phones or the built-in USB drive).

Beginning with the 2010 model year, the MKZ offered a sport package with 18-inch ten spoke wheels, revised suspension settings, Bridge of Weir leather seating surfaces in dark charcoal or steel grey with Cashmere-colored tuxedo seam and piping, interior aluminum trim in place of the standard wood trim, bespoke floor mats with MKZ badge, grille with black bars, darkened headlamps and body-color door handle. Also optional, a package, marketed as the Executive Package provided dark charcoal Bridge of Weir leather with suede inserts and a dark seam, or cashmere-colored leather with leather seat inserts and dark seam; front and rear premium floor mats with Lincoln logo and suede edging, genuine walnut swirl wood accents on the instrument panel and center console; unique door-trim inserts with accent stitching and bespoke front center console armrest insert. Also for 2011, Lincoln offered an interior aluminum trim package, substituting aluminum trim on the instrument panel and front and rear doors (in lieu of genuine wood) and a fully leather-wrapped steering wheel.

=== MKZ Hybrid (2011) ===
Lincoln presented the 2011 MKZ Hybrid to the public and motoring press at the 2010 New York International Auto Show, co-developed with the Ford Fusion and Mercury Milan hybrid models, the three models sharing identical engineering — as "green halo vehicles" for Ford Motor Company. Having pioneered its first generation system with the 2005-2007 Ford Escape and Mercury Mariner, the Fusion represented Ford's second generation hybrid engineering system.

As Lincoln's first four-cylinder engine and first hybrid electric vehicle, the MKZ's hybrid powertrain was a parallel or full hybrid drivetrain combining a 2.5-L, 156 horsepower Atkinson cycle Duratec inline four-cylinder gasoline engine; flywheel mounted 106 horsepower (78Kw) Permanent Magnet AC synchronous (BLDC) 275 Volt electric motor; Sanyo-supplied nickel-metal hydride battery; electronically controlled continuously variable transmission (eCVT); and electrically powered steering. The configuration offered a total of 191 hp (142 kW). Because in an Atkinson cycle four stroke engine the intake valve is held open longer during the intake stroke, the engine is more efficient than a typical Otto cycle four stroke engine — but produces less power and torque — and is therefore supplemented by the electric motor to deliver serviceable acceleration.

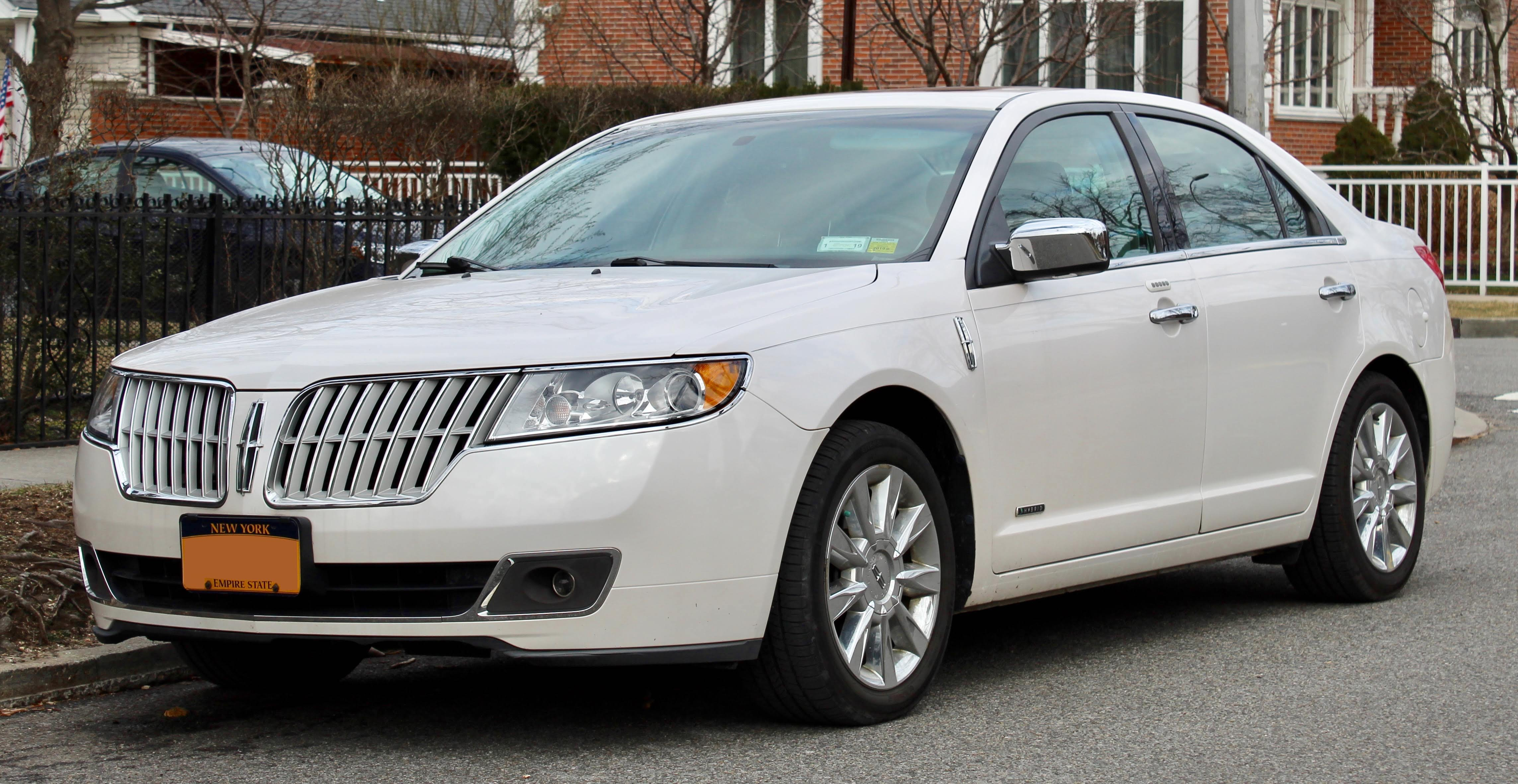
2012 MKZ Hybrid

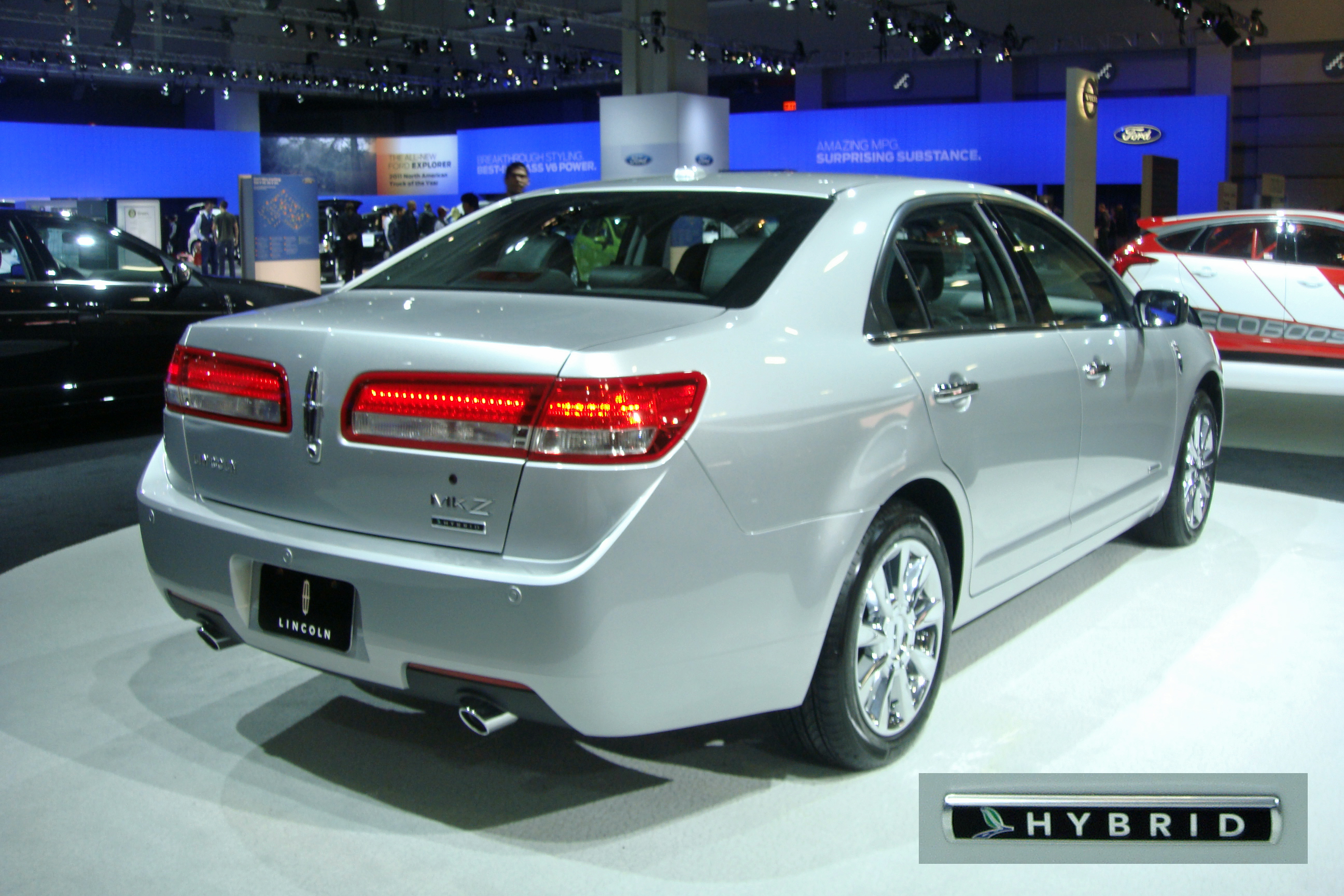
MKZ Hybrid with leaf road badging on trunk lid and front doors

Achieving an EPA city rating of 41 mpg_{‑US} (5.7 L/100 km; 49 mpg_{‑imp}) and a highway rating of 36 mpg_{‑US} (6.5 L/100 km; 43 mpg_{‑imp}) and an EV mode that enabled driving short distances on electricity alone at speeds up to 47 mph (76 km/h), the MKZ Hybrid was the most fuel-efficient luxury sedan in the U.S. until the release of the 2011 Lexus CT 200h in March 2011.

Externally distinguished by three HYBRID emblems on the trunk lid and lower front doors, the MKZ Hybrid was otherwise visually identical to its ICE counterpart, and Ford took the unusual step of offering both powertrains at the same MSRP. Sales began in September 2010, and of the approximately 136,600 first generation MKZs manufactured, about 13,000 were hybrid models. Named the Motor Trend 2010 Car of the Year (as the Fusion), the MKZ and its counterparts went on to win numerous awards.

A number of press releases for the Ford Fusion detailed features and enhancements of the hybrid system shared with the MKZ:

- Variable Cam Timing (iVCT): The system used Intake Variable Cam Timing (iVCT) to facilitate smooth transitions between gasoline and electric modes. Spark and cam timing were dynamically adjusted based on engine load, boosting efficiency and cutting emissions.
- Climate Management: An intelligent climate control system monitored cabin temperature, running the gas engine only when required to heat the interior. An air conditioning compressor using electric power was also included, which further minimized engine fuel consumption.
- Emissions and Throttle Management: The electronic throttle control was enhanced to reduce airflow on engine shutdown, thereby decreasing fuel requirements on restarts. A wide-band oxygen sensor monitored the air-fuel ratio, making real-time adjustments to minimize pollutants.
- Battery & Voltage Conversion: the system used a nickel–metal hydride battery high voltage traction battery pack with a 20 percent reduction in the battery cell count compared to Ford first generation configuration, while maintaining its capacity at 1.3 Kw/hr; reducing its volume by 30 percent and its weight by 23 percent, as well as no longer requiring a dedicated air conditioning system. The battery's advanced electro-chemistry allowed it to run at higher temperatures and to be cooled via cabin air, specifically via vents below the rear seats. An additional variable voltage AC/DC converter boosted voltage to the high voltage traction battery for greater motor and generator efficiency, while a new high-efficiency converter provided 14 percent more output (vs. Ford's first gen system) to accommodate a wider range of operational features.
- Braking System Efficiency: kinetic energy normally scrubbed off via braking heat and friction was recaptured by a regenerative braking system. Designed to initiate full regenerative braking before friction braking in urban driving, the system recovered nearly 94 percent of the kinetic energy. A simulator brake actuation system managed this process and offered a superior brake pedal feel compared to Ford's previous generation.
- Instrumentation: a digital, interactive Fuel Consumption Display (FCD), marketed as Smart Gauge with EcoGuide, was designed to coach the driver to more efficient driving. In addition to four customizable modes (Inform, Enlighten, Engage, and Empower) with increasing levels of feedback, a user-selectable "vine graphic" dramatized driving efficiency, "rewarding" the driver with more leaves for more economical driving — upgraded in the Lincoln to include flowers modeled after apple blossoms.

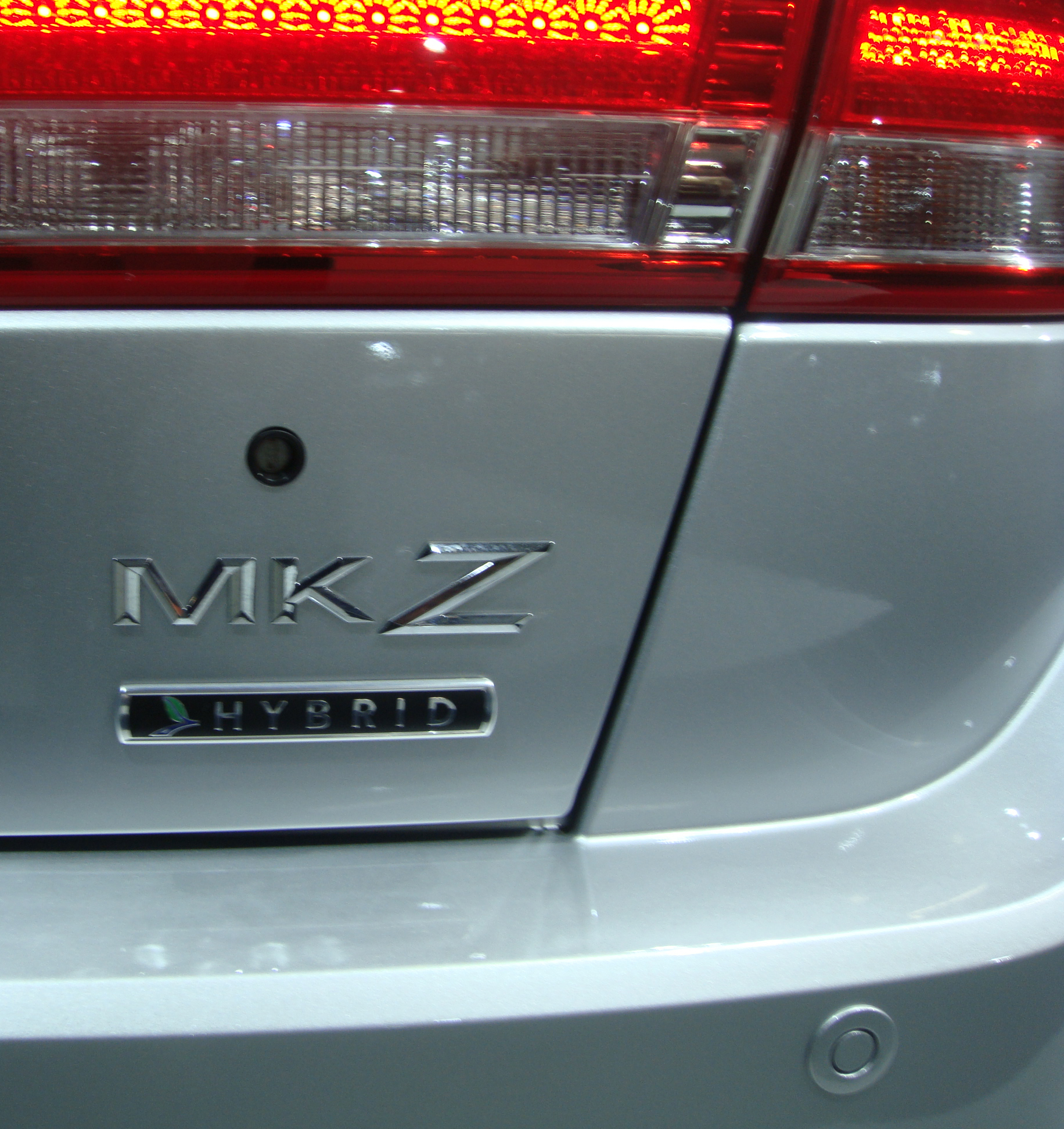
The Lincoln MKZ Hybrid was identified by a badge with Ford's leaf and highway logo.

- Packaging: Hybrid models featured fixed rear seat backs in contrast to fold-down rear seats of ICE models, to accommodate the High Voltage Battery (HVB), vertically located just behind the rear seat-back, and cooled via vents at the face of the rear seat cushions.
- Electronic CVT or eCVT transmission: the hybrid system used an electrically controlled, continuously variable transmission employing Ford's Power Split technology, a electronically controlled continuously variable transmission (eCVT) with a power-split planetary gearset to integrate power from the 2.5L Atkinson-cycle I4 engine and two electric motor-generators. The system received more than 200 patents.
- Licensing: During development of its hybrid system, Ford conducted a patent search, realizing its systems could infringe on Toyota's hybrid patents. Likewise, Toyota was developing diesel technologies that could infringe on Ford's patents. In an agreed upon trade, the two companies allowed each other's patent infringement.
- Testing: Ford tested its hybrid technology in a fleet at Yellow Cab in San Francisco, the cabs driven about 80,000 to 90,000 miles annually as well as in "around the clock in high-mileage, extreme-usage hybrid taxis around the country," totaling more than 80 million miles in California.
- Operation: According to Ford's Hybrid-electric vehicle systems engineer, the second generation hybrid used a control logic with much tighter integration of engine operation and power delivery. "The new logic [went] as far as to vary the engine's valve timing, fuel delivery, and spark timing to match the power delivered through the electric motor, permitting very aggressive fuel shutdown under light loads. As a result, the [hybrid's] 2.5-liter four-cylinder engine shut itself off twice as often as the earlier hybrid design, with the electric system providing more power. In addition, new control logic for the regenerative brakes recapture[d] up to 94 percent of the braking energy and fed it to the battery." The system also minimized "flutter-rumble" as it transitions from gas engine to electric mode. Automobile magazine noted the gasoline engine seamlessly starts up and shuts down "with only the very faintest shudder". with USA Today noting "there was no – none, nada, zip – vibration or shimmying in the test car when the gasoline kicked in to help the electric".
- Design: Battery integration was designed by Delphi Automotive and Ford engineers designed the battery management software and electronics.

The first generation MKZ Hybrid was marketed by Ford as a competitor to the Lexus HS 250h and Lexus ES Hybrid. As of July 2011, the MKZ Hybrid was the only hybrid in the market with the same price as its gasoline variant. Ford reported that until June 2011, about 20% of 2011 MKZ sales were hybrids, and the market share was even higher in markets where hybrids in general sold well, such as the Los Angeles region, where sales of the hybrid model represented 44%, and the San Francisco area, with a market share of 66%.

For 2011, the MKZ Hybrid base price was US$35,520, and with options including a sunroof, navigation system, blind spot monitors, a THX surround-sound stereo, and a backup camera, the MSRP was US$41,370. A study by Vincentric, a Michigan-based data compilation and analysis company, noted that of 25 hybrid vehicles tested from the 2012 model year, the MKZ delivered the lowest five-year total ownership costs compared to their traditionally powered counterparts, saving $6,168 over its ICE variant.

Lincoln introduced the first generation MKZ Hybrid with a Smarter than Luxury TV ad campaign designed by Team Detroit. Featuring Mad Men's John Slattery, the spot was filmed at the Salk Institute and used the tagline The 2011 Lincoln MKZ Hybrid. It's not just luxury; it's smarter than that. For the same Smarter than Luxury campaign, print ads carried a title Nobody's Fool in the Geogrotesque font, with the copy: "don't let anyone tell you "luxury" and "41 miles per gallon city" and "reasonably priced" are contradictions in terms."

The first generation Ford Fusion Hybrid was awarded the North American Car of the Year prize at the 2010 Detroit Auto Show and named Motor Trend's Car of the Year, was one of Car and Driver magazine's "10 Best Cars for 2010". On receiving the latter, Car and Driver noted "when we recognized the Fusion hybrid as a 10 Best winner in 2010, we noted that 'you can drive it for fun (a hybrid first) or for mileage — which is also fun. This applies verbatim to the MKZ hybrid." It was one of the five finalists for the 2011 Green Car of the Year awarded by the Green Car Journal in November 2010, which was won by the Chevrolet Volt. In its 2011 Hybrid Scorecard, the Union of Concerned Scientists (UCS) ranked the MKZ Hybrid, together with the Lexus CT200h, as the top luxury hybrid models in the scorecard's environmental improvement category, an achievement the UCS attributed to their relatively small gasoline engines. Nevertheless, the Lincoln MKZ Hybrid ranked higher than the Lexus on all factors: consumer value, hybrid technology, fuel efficiency, and pollution reduction. Also, the UCS praised the MKZ Hybrid, together with the Hyundai Sonata Hybrid, because both hybrids were available with few or no forced features that inflated the cost without adding to fuel savings or reducing emissions. The UCS's Hybrid Scorecard ratings for the MKZ Hybrid were higher than the non-luxury Toyota Prius for environmental performance, and hybrid value; both were rated the same for forced features; and the Prius scores higher in fuel economy.

=== Safety ===
The MKZ initially received mediocre crash test ratings. Beginning with 2007 models manufactured after January 2007, structural reinforcements were added to the MKZ to improve occupant protection in frontal overlap crashes. Beginning with 2010 models, design changes were made to the door interior trim to improve occupant protection in side impact crashes. Subsequently, the car was retested by both the National Highway Traffic Safety Administration and the Insurance Institute for Highway Safety and received higher ratings, becoming an Insurance Institute for Highway Safety Top Safety Pick from 2010 onwards.

2007 Lincoln MKZ on Insurance Institute for Highway Safety
| Category | Rating |
|---|---|
| Small overlap front | Marginal |
| Moderate overlap front | Good |
| Side impact | Acceptable |
| Roof strength | Acceptable |
| Head restraints & seats | Marginal |

2010 Lincoln MKZ on Insurance Institute for Highway Safety
| Category | Rating |
|---|---|
| Small overlap front | Marginal |
| Moderate overlap front | Good |
| Side impact | Good |
| Roof strength | Good |
| Head restraints & seats | Good |

National Highway Traffic Safety Administration crash test ratings (2008):

- Frontal Crash Test – Driver:
- Frontal Crash Test – Passenger:
- Side Impact Rating – Driver:
- Side Impact Rating – Rear Passenger:
- Rollover Rating (AWD): 9.2%
- Rollover Rating (FWD): 10.5%

== Second generation (2013) ==
Second generation
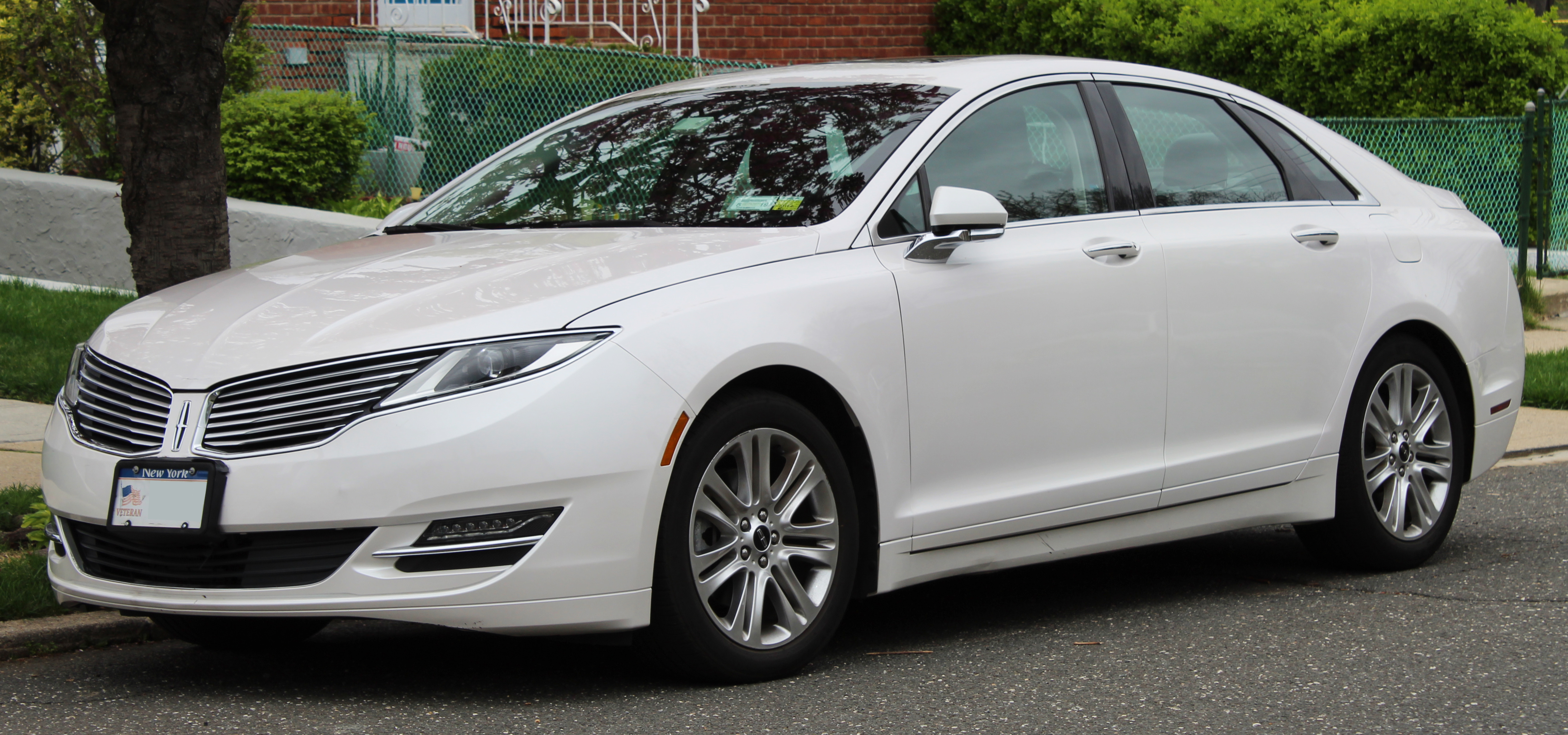

Overview
- Production: 2012–2020
- Model years: 2013–2020
- Designer: Max Wolff (Exterior); Soo Kang (Interior)

Body and chassis
- Platform: Ford CD4 platform (CD533)
- Related: Ford Fusion/Mondeo; Lincoln Continental; Ford Taurus (seventh generation)

Powertrain
- Engine: Gasoline: 2.0 L EcoBoost I4 (turbocharged); 3.7 L Duratec V6 (2013–2016); 3.0 L EcoBoost V6 (twin-turbo) (2017–2020); Gasoline Hybrid: 2.0 L Duratec I4
- Transmission: Ford 6-speed 6F automatic; Ford HF35 automatic Hybrid

Dimensions
- Wheelbase: 112.2 in (2,850 mm)
- Length: 194.1 in (4,930 mm)
- Width: 73.4 in (1,864 mm)
- Height: 58.1–58.2 in (1,476–1,478 mm)
- Curb weight: 3,713–3,911 lb (1,684–1,774 kg)

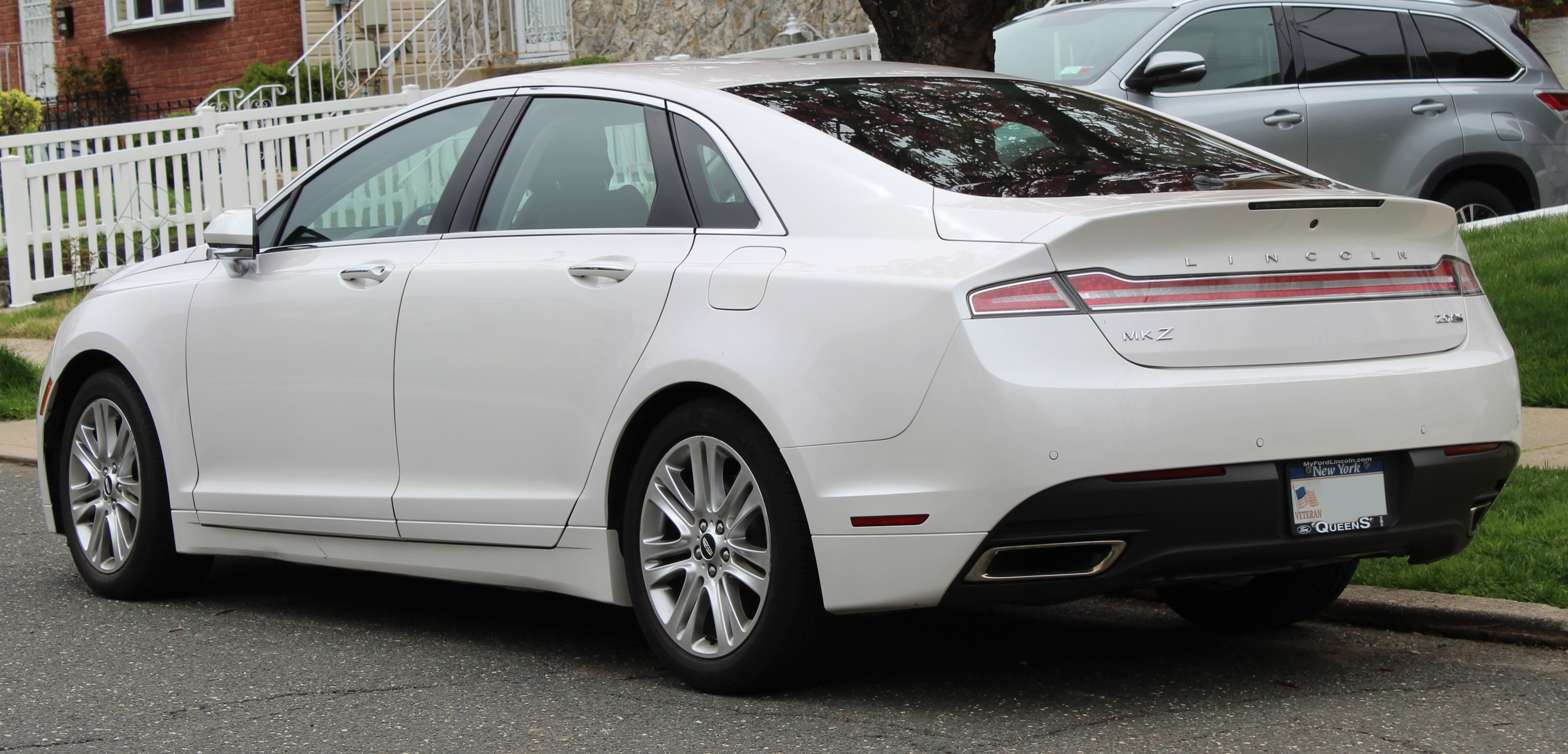
Rear view (pre-facelift)

Ford redesigned the Lincoln MKZ for the 2013 model year, presenting its concept model at the 2012 North American International Auto Show and presenting the production version at the 2012 New York Auto Show. The second generation followed the general concept idea released in the model displayed at the 2012 Detroit Auto Show, sharing the company's CD4 platform with Fusion and Mondeo. and offering three powertrain options: a 240-horsepower EcoBoost 2-liter four-cylinder (FWD or AWD); a 300-horsepower 3.7-liter V6 (FWD or AWD); and a hybrid system combining the 2-liter power plant with an electric motor.

The MKZ was originally to be released in November 2012, but was subsequently delayed to January along with Fusion production. Release was again held to resolve quality issues, with early production models shipped from the Hermosillo facility to Ford's Flat Rock plant for inspection before shipment to dealerships, an unprecedented move for such an extensive product, insure a better market reception and long term profitability. Production reached dealerships in sufficient quantities by mid-March 2013.

Subsequent changes for 2014 were primarily limited to color choices. For 2015, automatic headlights, rear parking sensors and rear view camera became standard. The Black Label trim package was introduced featuring premium interior trim materials including Alcantara on the headliner, visors, and upper trim, luxurious floormats, premium leather seating surfaces with embossed Lincoln logos on the headrests, and featured a leather-wrapped instrument panel. The leather wrapped IP required extensive testing and development to achieve a "discreet" airbag, one without a visible seam, a first for a Ford Motor Company product. Additionally in 2015, the Lincoln MKZ was exported to China to increase overall sales.

=== MKZ Hybrid (2013) ===
With the second generation MKZ's complete redesign, Lincoln shifted the MKZ Hybrid's high voltage battery from nickel-hydride to a compact lithium-ion battery pack. The updated powertrain delivering a higher fuel economy up to 48 mpg_{US} (4.9 to 5.0 L/100 km; 56 to 58 mpg_{imp}) highway.

The second generation MKZ Hybrid was launched in mid-2012, and Lincoln presented the 2013 model at the 2012 North American International Auto Show.

The hybrid, like the previous-generation MKZ Hybrid, was available for the same price as the non-hybrid model.

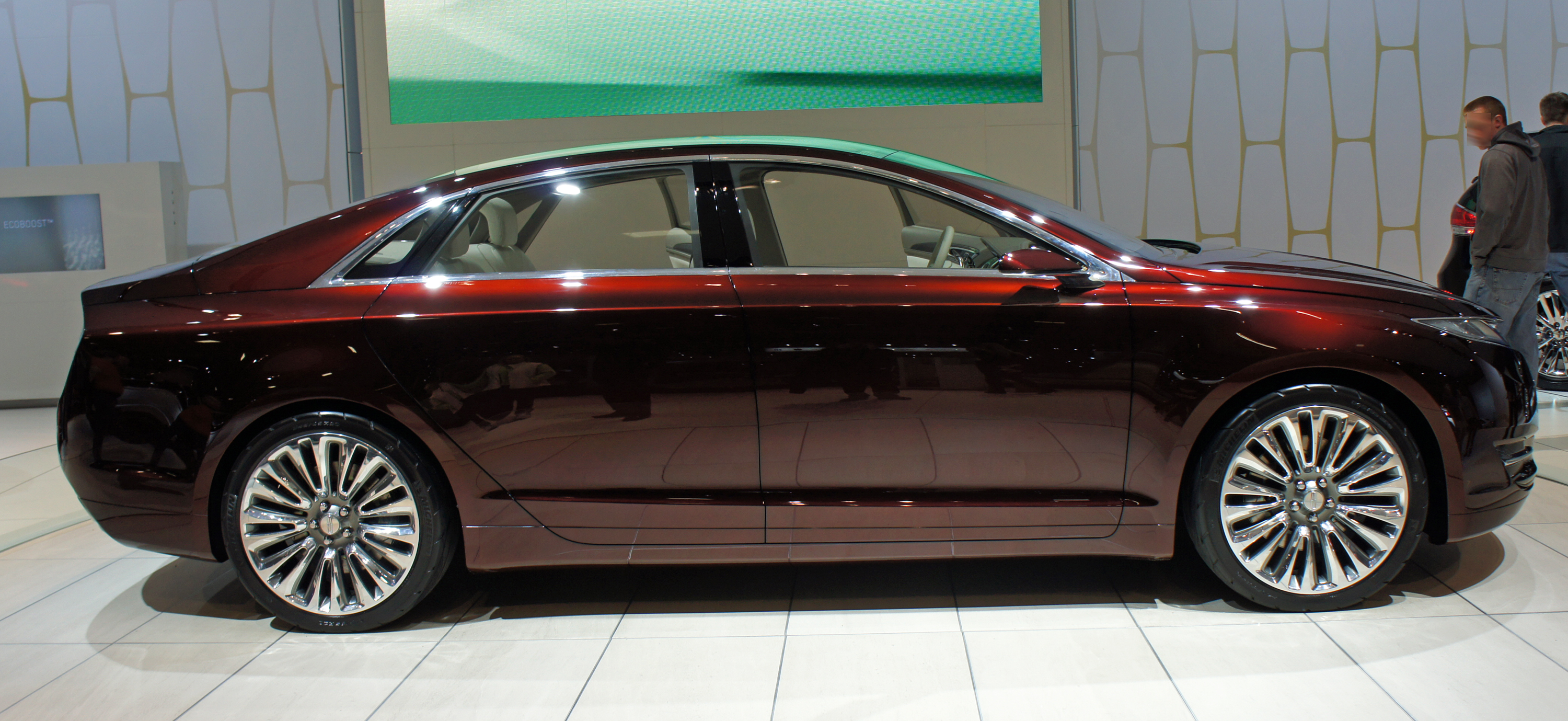
The Lincoln MKZ concept was unveiled at the 2012 North American International Auto Show.

The US Environmental Protection Agency (EPA) rated the 2013 MKZ Hybrid at 45 mpg_{‑US} (5.2 L/100 km; 54 mpg_{‑imp}) with the same rating for combined/city/highway cycles. The 2013 model year 2.0-liter, 4-cylinder FWD automatic MKZ rating is 26 mpg_{‑US} (9.0 L/100 km; 31 mpg_{‑imp}) combined, 22 mpg_{‑US} (11 L/100 km; 26 mpg_{‑imp}) in the city, and 33 mpg_{‑US} (7.1 L/100 km; 40 mpg_{‑imp}) on the highway.

These ratings allowed the 2013 MKZ Hybrid to become the most fuel-efficient luxury vehicle in the U.S. and improve the fuel economy of the Lexus ES 300h hybrid by 5 mpg_{-US} on the combined cycle. Despite sharing the same powertrain, the 2013 MKZ Hybrid rated 2 mpg_{-US} combined less than its sibling, the second-generation Ford Fusion Hybrid at 47 mpg_{‑US} (5.0 L/100 km; 56 mpg_{‑imp}).

The 2017 MKZ Hybrid's EPA rating is 41 mpg_{‑US} (5.7 L/100 km; 49 mpg_{‑imp}) in the city, and 38 mpg_{‑US} (6.2 L/100 km; 46 mpg_{‑imp}) on the highway.

=== Facelift (2017) ===
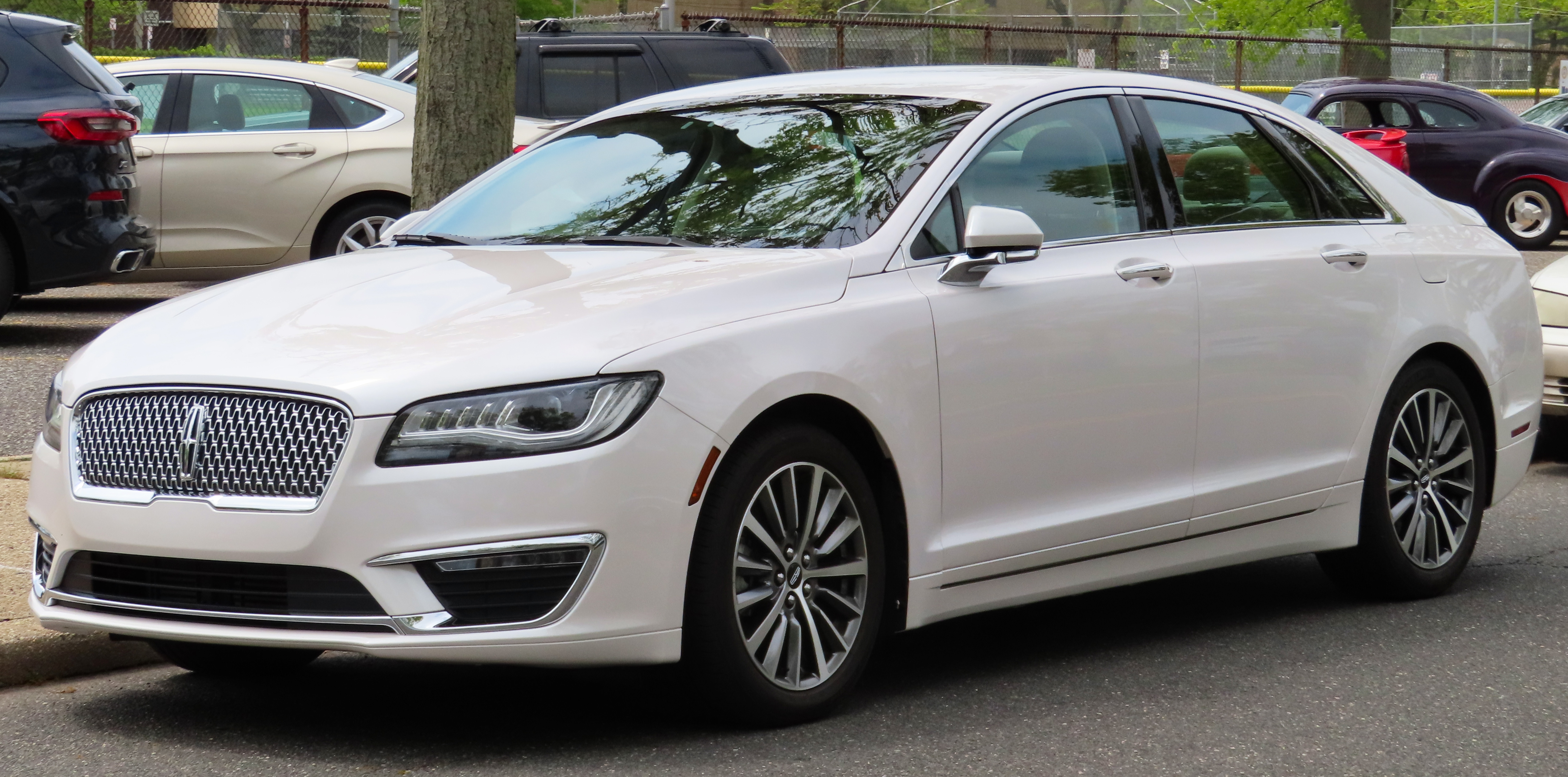
2017 Lincoln MKZ

The MKZ received a facelift for 2017, presented on November 18, 2015, at the LA Auto Show, featuring redesigned front grille and headlights. The 3.7 L V6 was dropped in favor of a 3.0 L twin-turbo V6 engine unique to Lincoln, producing between 350 and 400 horsepower depending on the drive-train. Trim levels include the standard model, plus Premiere, Select, Reserve and top level Black Label, which is three special appearance packages, a tradition started with the Designer Editions in 1976. The MKZ offers the "Vineyard" (unique to the MKZ), "Chalet", and "Thoroughbred" theme appearance packages. In continuing with Lincoln tradition, Bridge of Weir "Deepsoft" leather is used for the Select and Reserve trim packages.

The transmission is no longer activated with a center console installed transmission selector; the computer-controlled transmission uses buttons installed to the left of the MyLincoln Touch infotainment touch screen labeled "P, R, N, D, S", a revival of an approach used in the 1950s by the Chrysler push button PowerFlite and the Packard Touchbutton Ultramatic. The "S" transmission selection represents "Sport" mode, where the Continuously Controlled Damping suspension, electric power steering and transmission shift points take on a different posture.

The MKZ received no more major changes, with the later model years bringing new colors and a gradual diminishing of the lineup. For 2020, the car's final year on the market, only the Base and Reserve trims remained, with either Hybrid, Turbo, or V6 powertrains.

=== Safety ===
The 2013 Lincoln MKZ earned the Insurance Institute for Highway Safety's Top Safety Pick+ award.

2013 Lincoln MKZ on Insurance Institute for Highway Safety
| Category | Rating |
|---|---|
| Small overlap front | Acceptable |
| Moderate overlap front | Good |
| Side impact | Good |
| Roof strength | Good |
| Head restraints & seats | Good |

2017 Lincoln MKZ on IIHS
| Category | Rating |
|---|---|
| Small overlap front | Good |
| Moderate overlap front | Good |
| Side impact | Good |
| Roof strength | Good |
| Head restraints & seats | Good |

== Sales ==
| Calendar Year | U.S. sales (2005–2021) | | | China |
| Calendar Year | Total (gas & hybrid) | Hybrid-only | Hybrid share | China |
|---|---|---|---|---|
| 2005 | 4,985 | | | —N/a |
| 2006 | 33,114 | | | —N/a |
| 2007 | 34,363 | | | —N/a |
| 2008 | 30,117 | | | —N/a |
| 2009 | 22,081 | | | —N/a |
| 2010 | 22,535 | 1,192 | 5.3% | —N/a |
| 2011 | 27,529 | 5,739 | 20.8% | —N/a |
| 2012 | 28,053 | 6,067 | 21.6% | —N/a |
| 2013 | 32,361 | 7,469 | 23.1% | —N/a |
| 2014 | 34,009 | 10,033 | 29.5% | —N/a |
| 2015 | 30,901 | 8,403 | 27.2% | 2,801 |
| 2016 | 30,534 | 7,219 | 23.6% | 7,325 |
| 2017 | 27,387 | 5,931 | 21.7% | 12,497 |
| 2018 | 19,852 | | | 12,560 |
| 2019 | 17,725 | | | 12,409 |
| 2020 | 12,518 | | | 5,788 |
| 2021 | 1,681 | | | 2,280 |

== See also ==
- Lincoln-Zephyr (1936–1942)
- Mercury Zephyr (1978-1983)
