= Lexus CT =

Subcompact luxury car by Lexus, 2010–2022

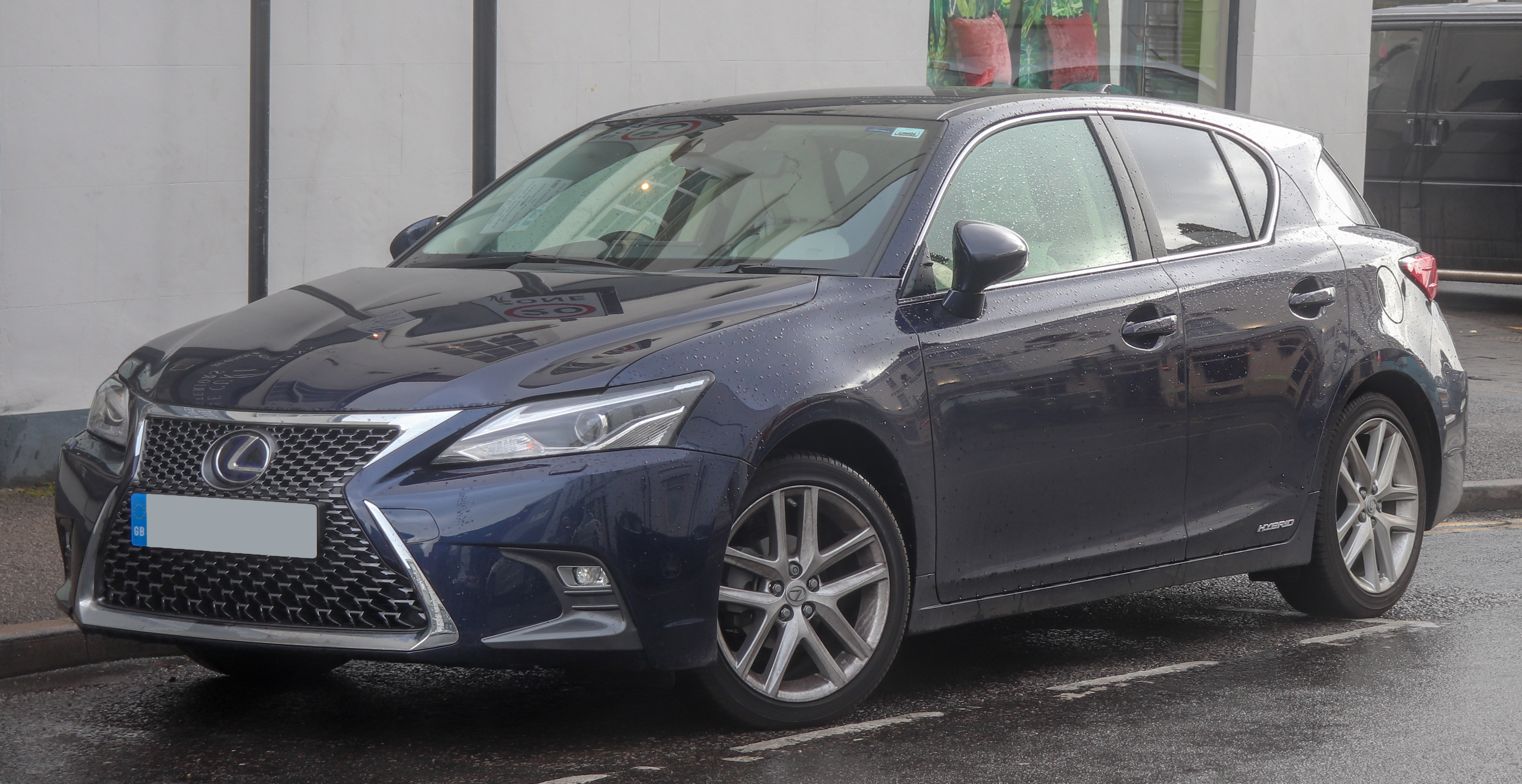
- 2018 Lexus CT 200h Premier (ZWA10, UK)

Overview
- Manufacturer: Toyota
- Model code: A10
- Production: December 2010 – October 2022
- Model years: 2011–2017 (US, Canada)
- Assembly: Japan: Miyawaka, Fukuoka (Toyota Motor Kyushu)
- Designer: Takeshi Tanabe

Body and chassis
- Class: Subcompact executive car (C)
- Body style: 5-door hatchback
- Layout: Front-engine, front-wheel-drive
- Platform: Toyota New MC platform
- Related: Toyota Auris (E180); Toyota Prius (XW30)

Powertrain
- Engine: 1.8 L 2ZR-FXE I4 (hybrid petrol)
- Electric motor: 60 kW (80 hp; 82 PS) 3JM AC synchronous
- Power output: 73 kW (98 hp; 99 PS) (petrol engine); 100 kW (134 hp; 136 PS) (combined system output)
- Transmission: eCVT
- Hybrid drivetrain: Series-parallel (Lexus Hybrid Drive)
- Battery: 1.3 kWh nickel-metal hydride

Dimensions
- Wheelbase: 2,600 mm (102.4 in)
- Length: 4,350 mm (171.3 in)
- Width: 1,765 mm (69.5 in)
- Height: 1,455 mm (57.3 in)
- Kerb weight: 1,420 kg (3,131 lb)

The Lexus CT (Japanese: レクサス・CT, Hepburn: Rekusasu CT) is a hybrid electric automobile sold by Lexus, a luxury division of Toyota, as a premium compact hatchback. The CT, consisting of a single model called the CT 200h, is a luxury hybrid based on the Toyota Prius drivetrain and Toyota MC platform chassis, and is the first luxury compact and hatchback hybrid. It is the first production model in Lexus's family to introduce the "Spindle Grille" design as seen in its fascia. It also superseded the IS as the smallest car in the Lexus lineup. It made its debut at the March 2010 Geneva International Motor Show, six months after the unveiling of the LF-Ch concept car; it is primarily targeted at the European market but was sold worldwide and was introduced to North American markets at the April 2010 New York International Auto Show. Lexus has trademarked the names CT 200h, CT 300h, and CT 400h. The design by Takeshi Tanabe was approved in 2008 and patented on 11 September 2009.

Production began in January 2011 and European sales following shortly after. Japan sales began on 12 January 2011, while US sales began in March 2011. The CT has been discontinued in the US and later Canada, with the 2017 model year being the last. Sales continued in some other markets until 2022.

Designated the platform code A10, when fitted with ZR-series petrol engine with hybrid setup, the CT is known by the model code ZWA10. "CT" stands for "Creative Touring" and "200h" refers to the hybrid performance being equal to that of a conventional 2.0-litre engine. However, Lexus distributors in some countries use the name, "Compact Touring".

The CT was discontinued in October 2022 with a special edition named Cherished Touring.

== Specifications ==
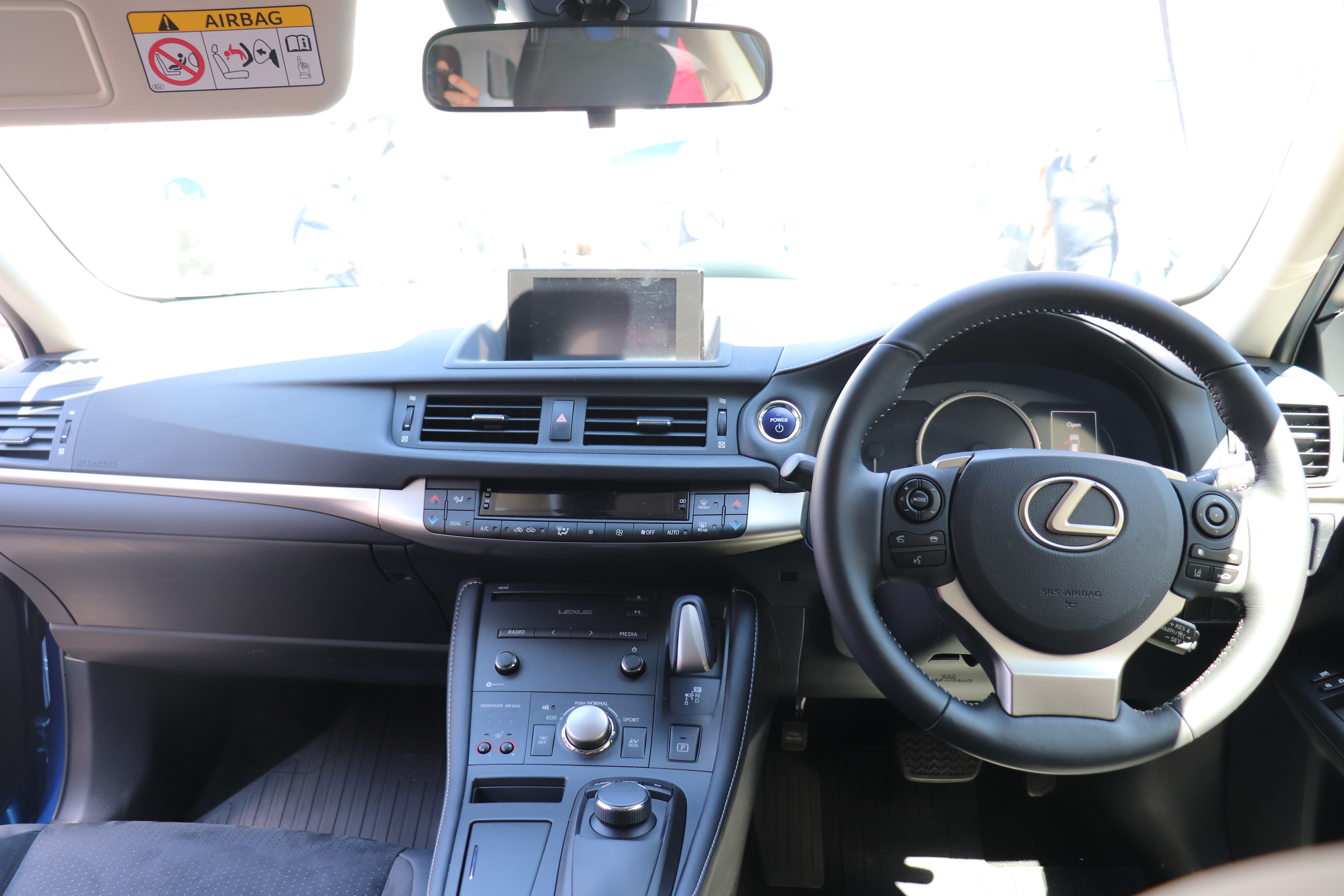
Interior

The CT 200h is powered by the same 1.8-litre VVT-i four-cylinder petrol engine (Toyota's 2ZR-FXE) as used in the Auris and Prius, producing 73 kW (98 hp) and 142 N⋅m (105 lbf⋅ft) of torque, paired with electric motor/generators in the hybrid drive system; together the engine and electric motors produce up to 100 kW (134 hp) and 207 N⋅m (153 lbf⋅ft) of torque along with an electronically controlled continuously variable transmission. Fuel consumption for the CT 200h is listed at 4.1 L/100 km (57.4 mpg_{‑US}) in Australia.

The CT 200h chassis is based on the Toyota MC platform, which is the same platform used by the Corolla and the Matrix. The Lexus CT 200h features a front MacPherson strut suspension and a rear double wishbone design. The CT 200h has four driving modes Normal, Sport, Eco and EV included on other hybrid drive vehicles. Sport mode modifies the throttle and electric power steering settings, while making the Stability control and traction control less intrusive, maximising the CT200h's performance. EV mode generates zero emissions at the vehicle by using only the vehicles electric motors to drive the vehicle.

Safety features include vehicle stability control (VSC) and eight standard airbags with the options of a pre-collision system with dynamic radar cruise control at extra cost. There is also a Vehicle Proximity Notification System, which uses a low tone to alert pedestrians to the presence of a hybrid motor vehicle, as well as telematic services (Safety Connect in North America).

== Facelifts ==
Pre-facelift (2011)

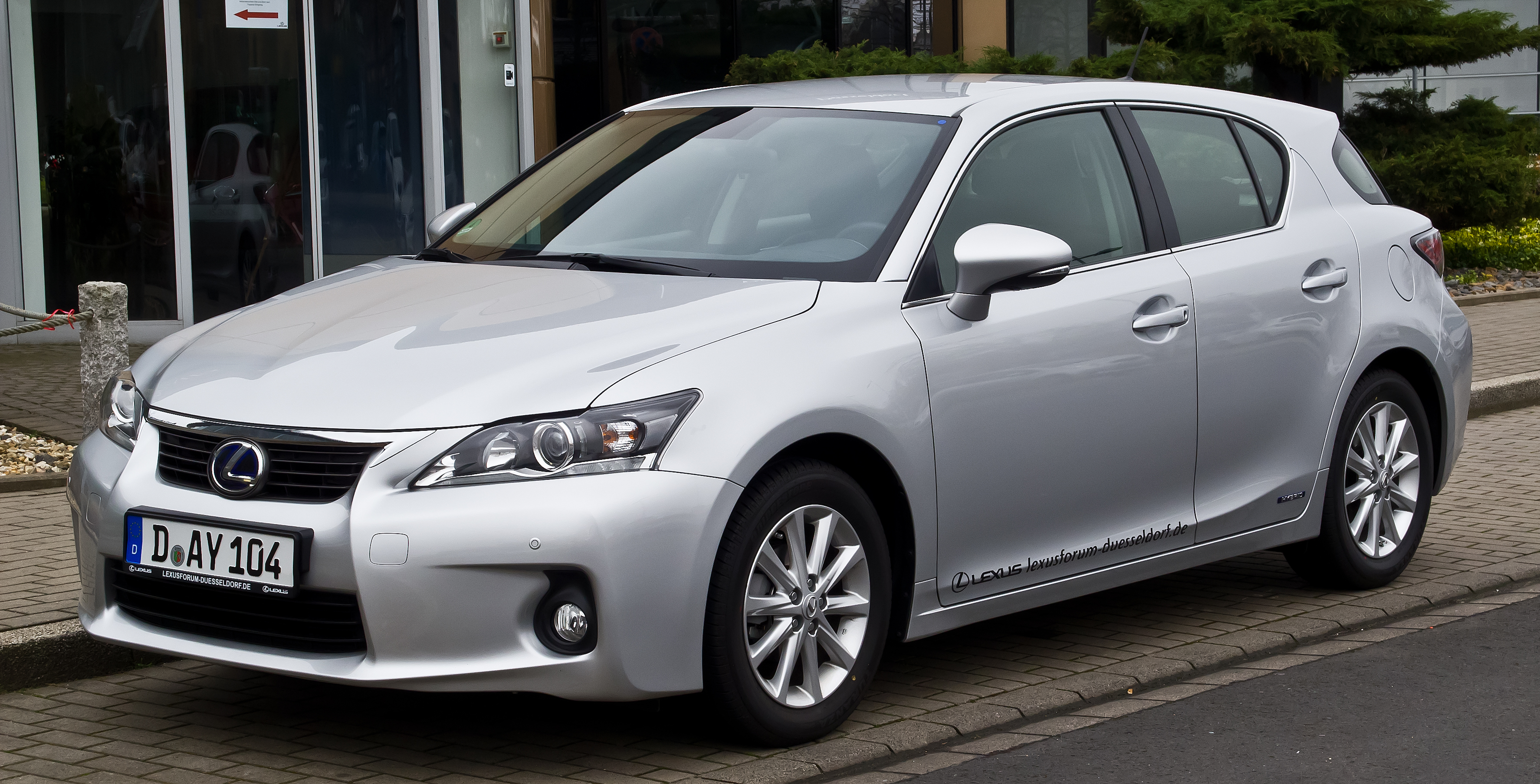
CT 200h Executive (Germany)

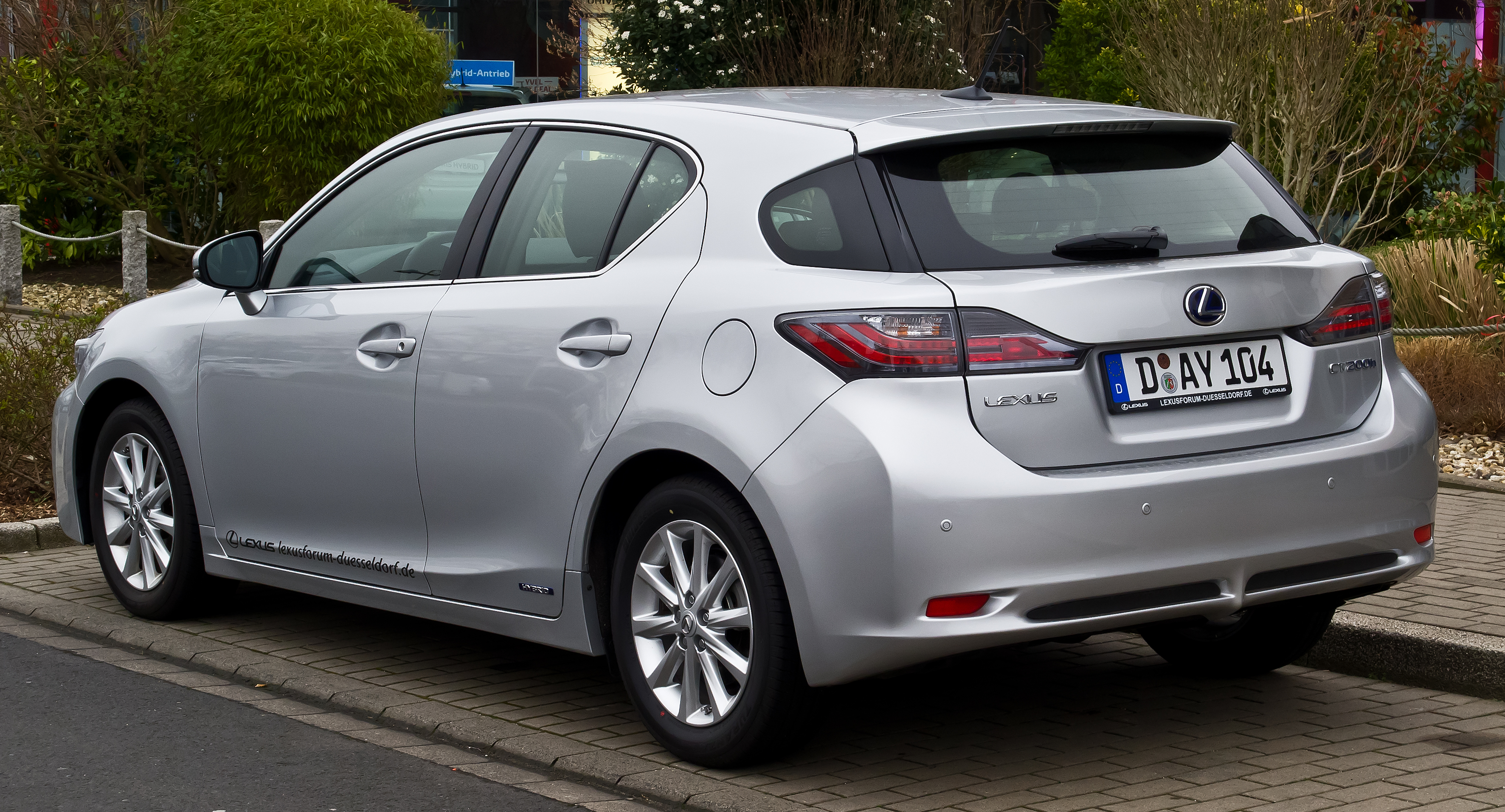
CT 200h Executive (Germany)

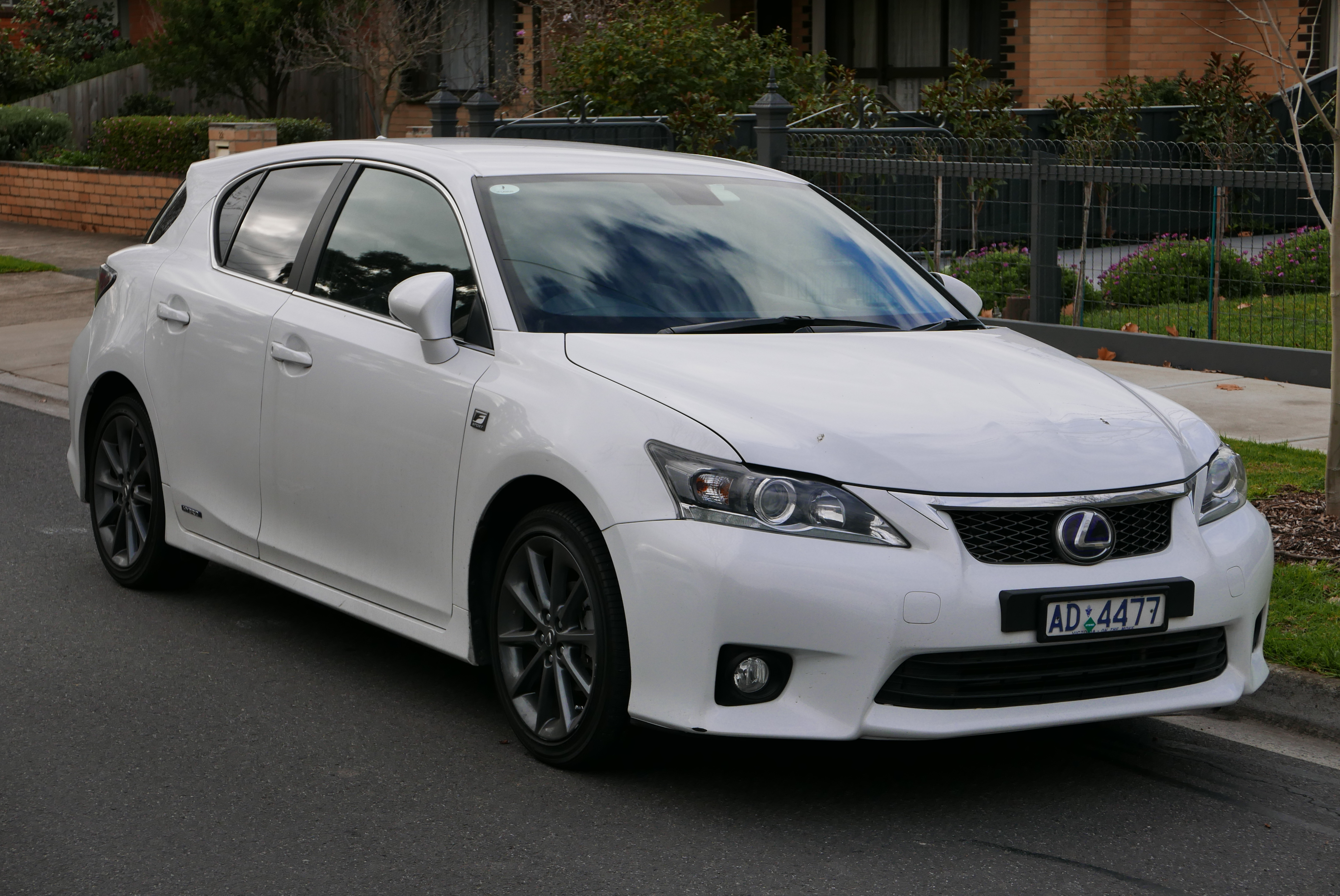
CT 200h F Sport (Australia)

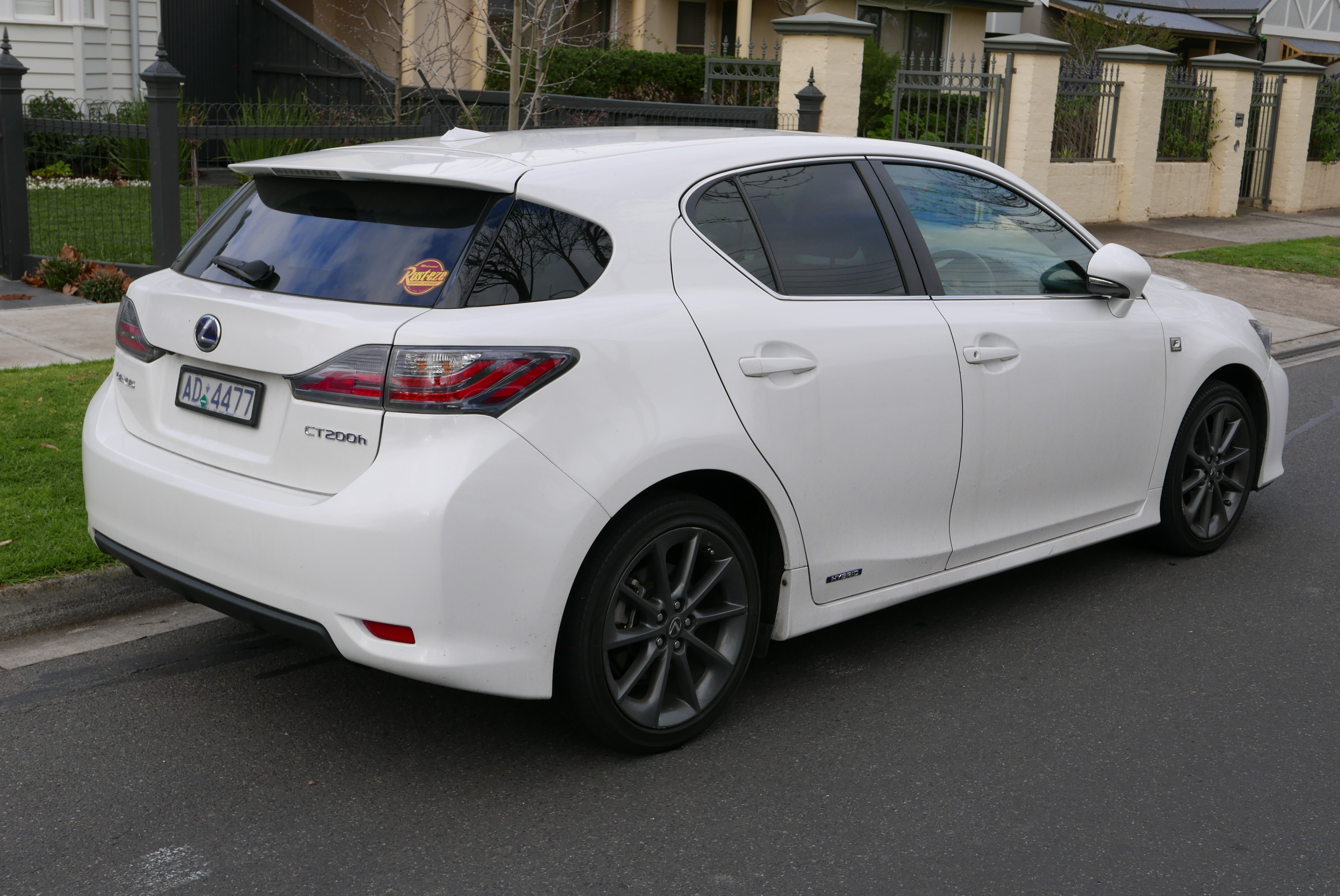
CT 200h F Sport (Australia)

First facelift (2013)

In 2013, for the 2014 model year, the styling of the CT was refreshed, using the Lexus corporate "Spindle" grille.

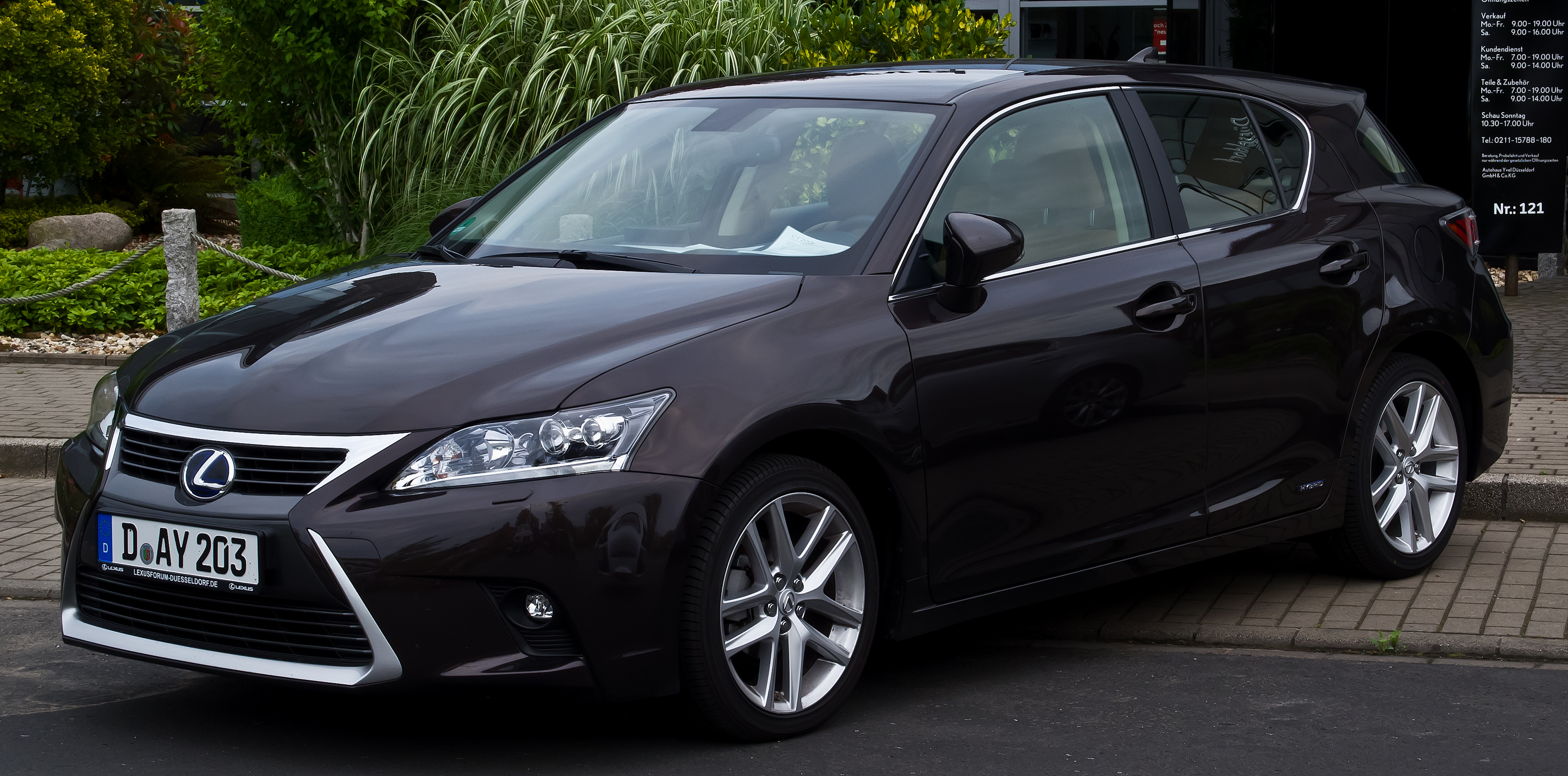
CT 200h Luxury (Germany)

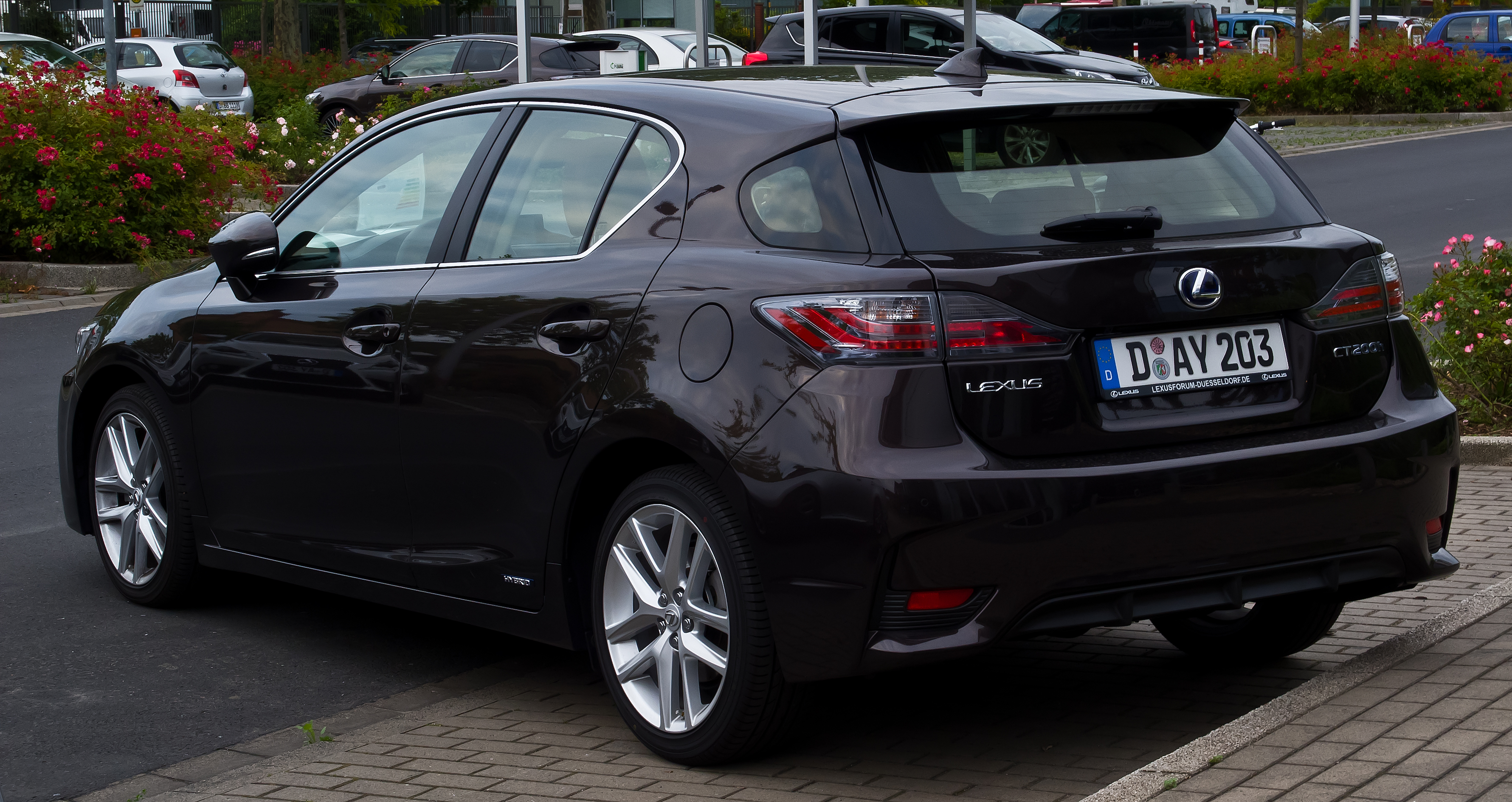
CT 200h Luxury (Germany)

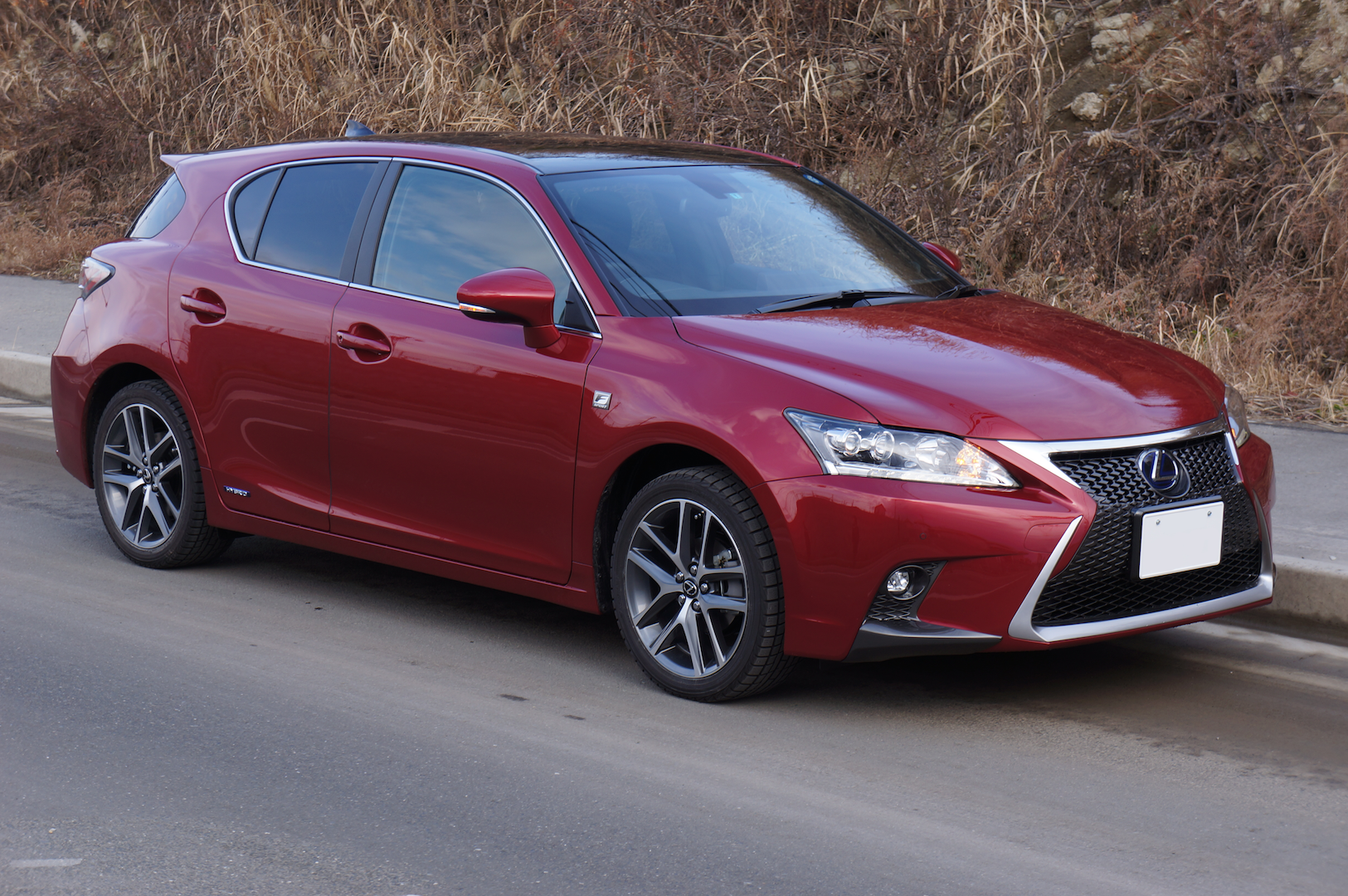
CT 200h F Sport (Japan)

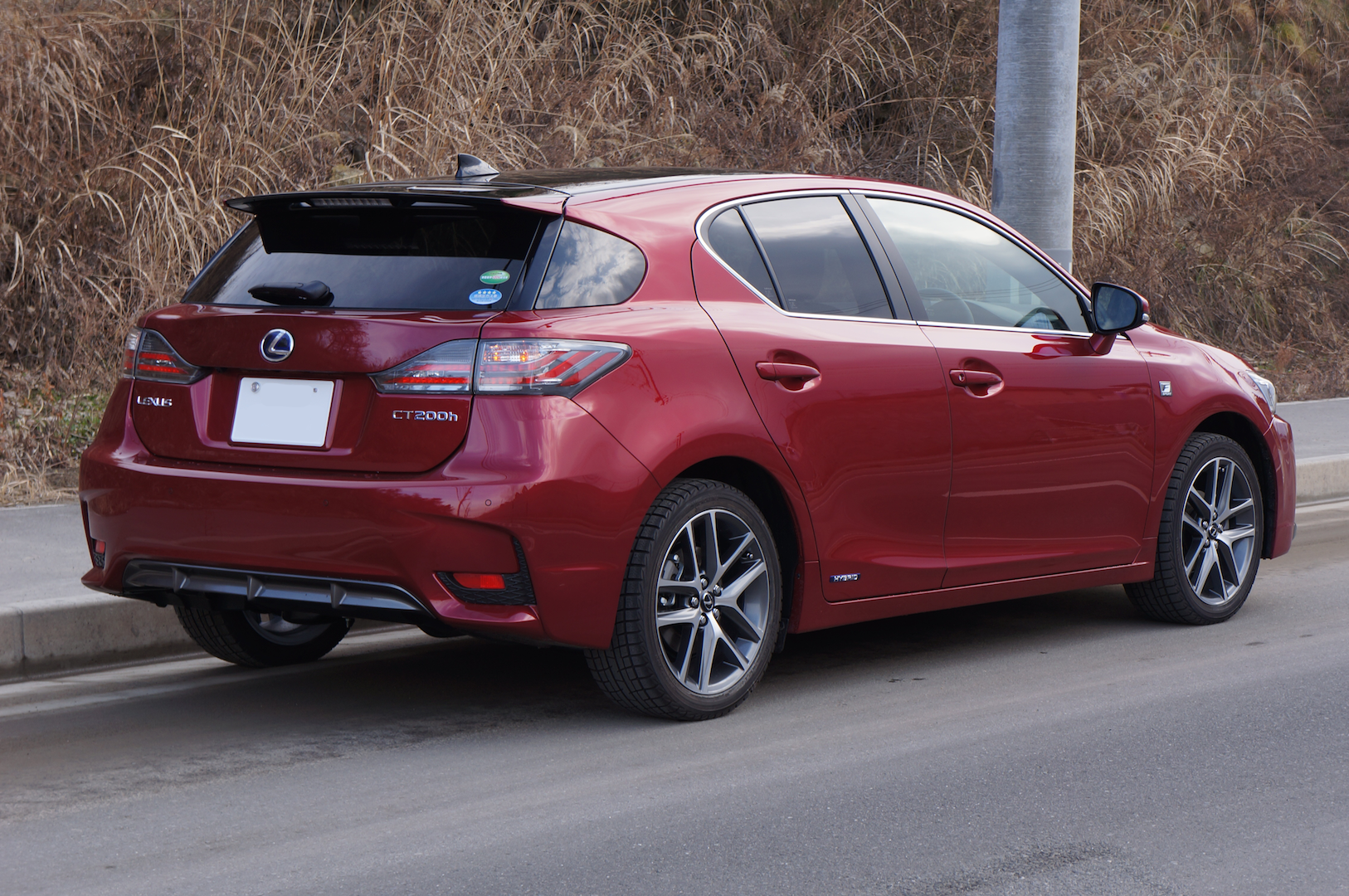
CT 200h F Sport (Japan)

Second facelift (2017)

The second facelift was launched in 2017, for the 2018 model year. This brought the option to specify full LED lights which featured a new design. A larger “Spindle” grille also came as standard on all models.

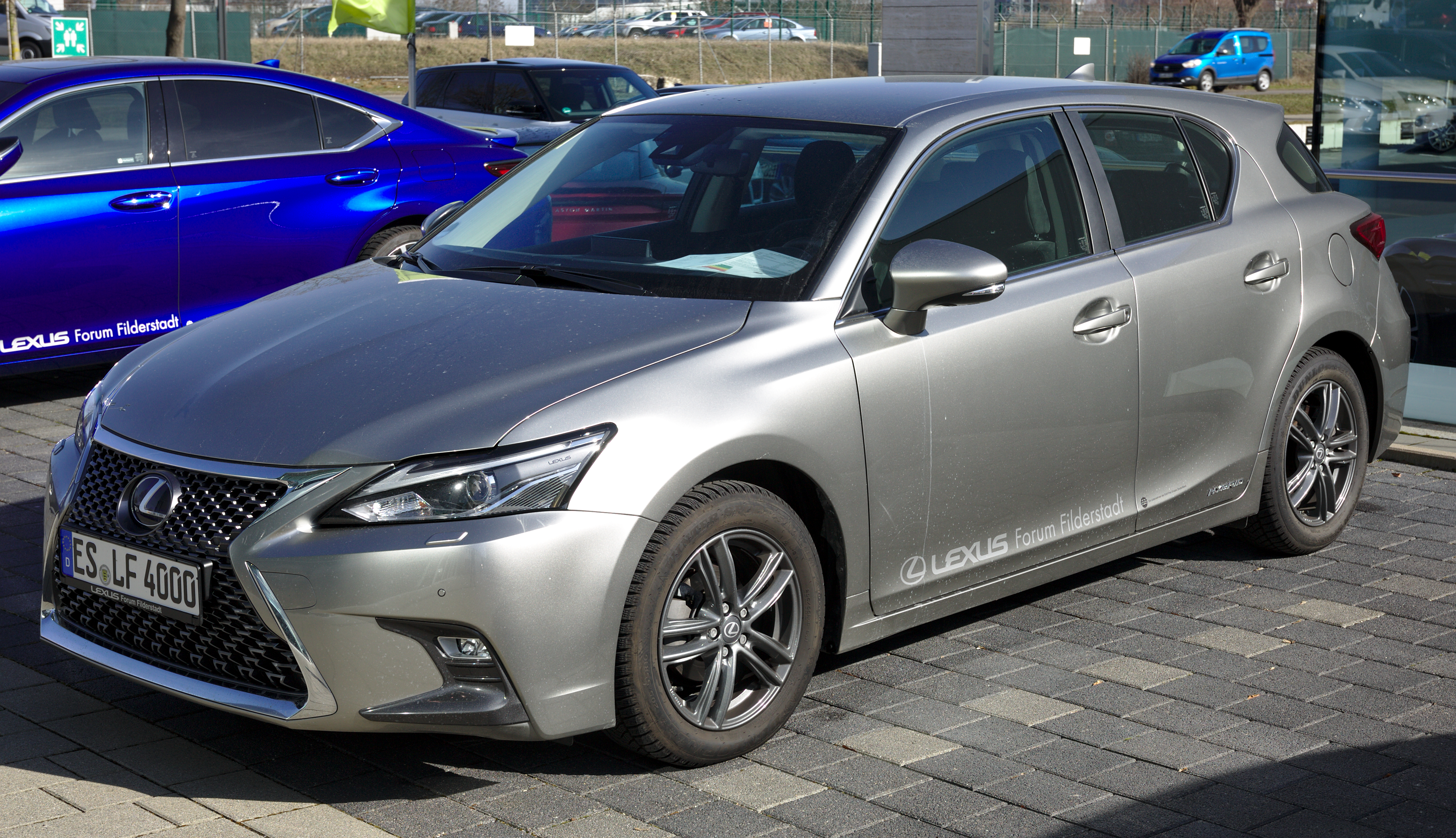
CT 200h (Europe)

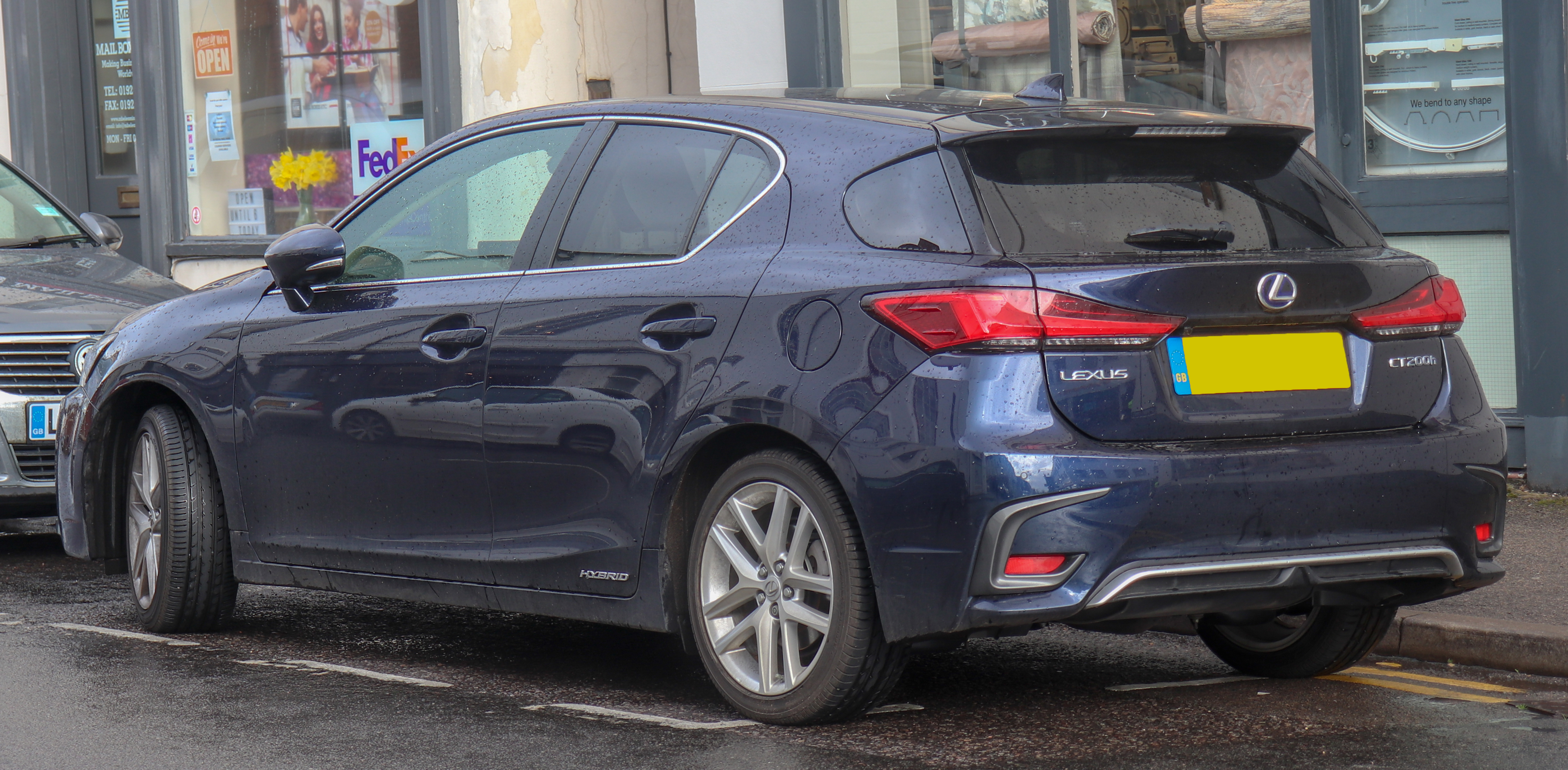
CT 200h Premier (UK)

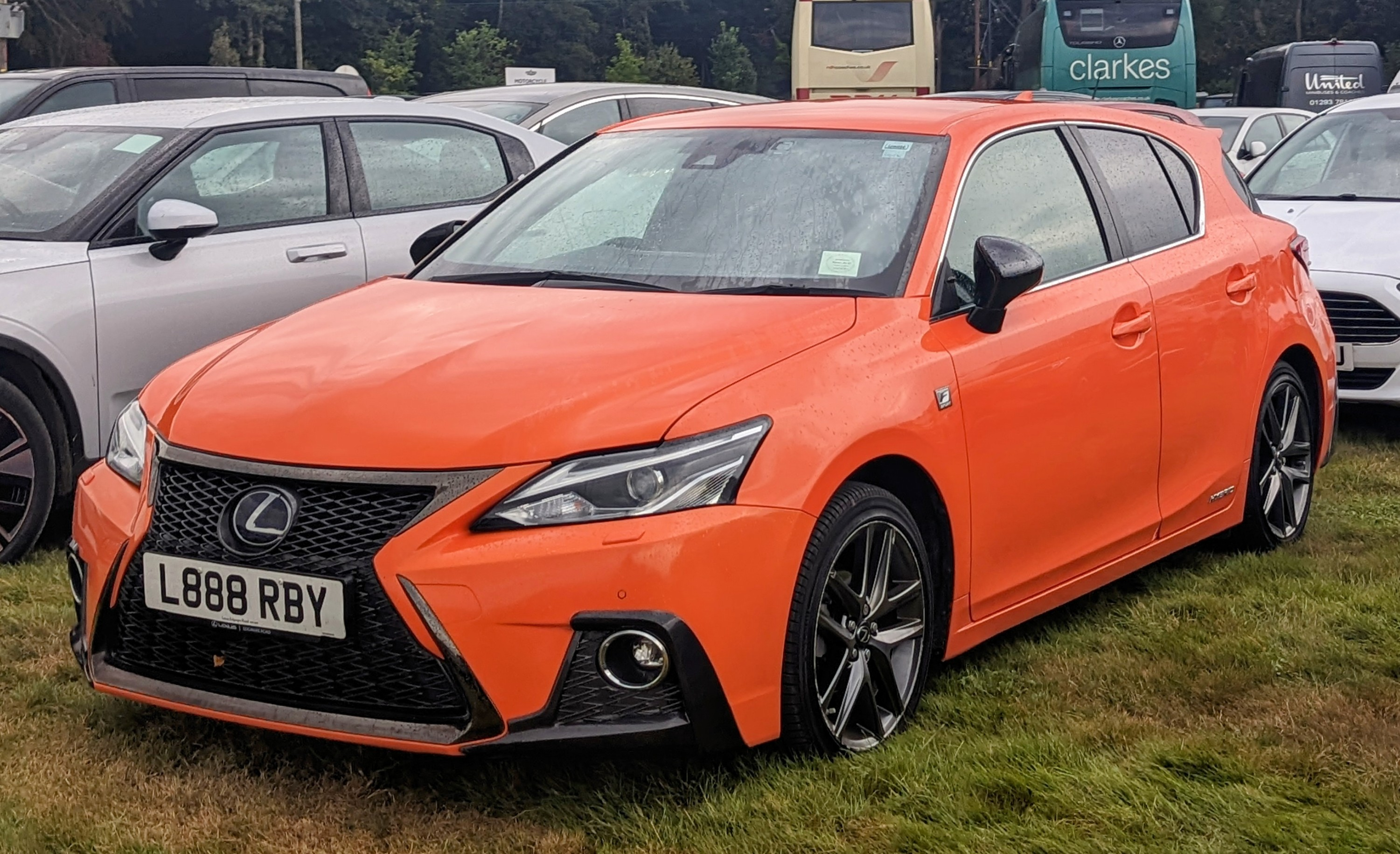
CT 200h F Sport (United Kingdom)

== Market ==
=== Australia ===
Standard features on the CT 200h include SmartAccess with push-button Start/Stop and touch sensors on exterior front-door handles, leather steering wheel, a six-speaker, audio system with a CD player, and Bluetooth phone connectivity, iPod connectivity, 17-inch aluminium alloy wheels, and dual zone automatic climate control. In Australia, the CT 200h is offered in "Prestige", "Luxury", "F Sport" and "Sport Luxury" specifications. The Luxury, F Sport and Sports Luxury variants add a reversing camera as standard, while the Sports Luxury gains active cruise control and the pre-collision safety system. F Sport models include all the features of the Luxury model, plus sports bumpers, sports side skirts and a large rear spoiler. Interior features of the F Sport are an F Sport steering wheel, sports pedals, scuff plates, instrument panel and privacy glass.

At the 2011 Australian Formula One Grand Prix in Melbourne (25–27 March 2011), the Lexus CT 200h was used in the Celebrity Challenge, a one-make, one-off series event held as part of the Grand Prix's weekend attractions. The event, supported by CAMS and sponsored by Lexus Australia, was promoted as the world's first race containing only petrol-electric vehicles.

Following the introduction of stricter crash safety regulations, the CT, along with the IS sedan and the RC coupe, were pulled out from the Australian market in November 2021.

=== North America ===
In North America, the CT launched in early 2011 for the 2011 model year. The facelift model arrived in 2013 for the 2014 model year. At the time, the "F Sport" package was offered, including a different variation on the spindle grille and other cosmetic differentiation. No performance enhancements came with the F Sport package, which used visually different wheels but the same tyres as the base CT.

In May 2017, Lexus announced that the CT model line would be discontinued in the US market.

Estimated fuel consumption is:

	City	Highway	Combined
US	5.5 L/100 km (43 mpg_{‑US})	5.9 L/100 km (40 mpg_{‑US})	5.6 L/100 km (42 mpg_{‑US})
Canada	5.5 L/100 km (42.8 mpg_{‑US})	5.9 L/100 km (39.9 mpg_{‑US})	5.7 L/100 km (41.3 mpg_{‑US})

=== Malaysia ===
In February 2011, Lexus introduced the CT with two variants: CT 200h and CT 200h Luxury in Malaysia. In October 2012, alongside the introduction of a CT200h F Sport variant, equipment list was improved for the CT200h variant. In July 2014 the Lexus CT facelift was introduced. The Lexus CT has since been discontinued in Malaysia.

=== Thailand ===
On 22 February 2011, Lexus introduced the CT in Thailand with four variants: CT 200h Luxury, CT 200h F-SPORT, CT 200h Premium NAVI and CT 200h Premium NAVI + Moon Roof. On 12 February 2014 a facelift was introduced with six variants: Luxury Fabric, Luxury Leather, F-SPORT, Premium Navi, Premium Navi Moon Roof and F-SPORT Navi Moon Roof. On 18 September 2017 a Second facelift was introduced with four variants: Luxury Fabric, Luxury Leather, Premium and F-SPORT. In 2019, Lexus announced the UX Crossover would replace the CT.

=== UK ===
The Lexus CT200h was sold in the UK market from 2011 until, in October 2020, it was announced imports of the CT line had ceased along with the IS line and RC line (except for the RC F), due to poor sales figures, fierce competition from European rivals, and a shift in the market towards crossover SUVs. The UX acts as a successor to the CT.

== Reception ==
The Union of Concerned Scientists (UCS) in its 2011 Hybrid Scorecard ranked the Lexus CT 200h, together with the Lincoln MKZ Hybrid, as the top luxury hybrid models in the scorecard's environmental improvement category, an achievement the UCS attributed to their relatively small petrol engines, as both carmakers downsized these vehicles' engines from six to four cylinders to maximize fuel economy. The UCS evaluation found that the Lexus CT 200h reduces greenhouse emissions by 42.9% as compared to the Lexus IS 250, used as its petrol-only similar for this comparison.

== Awards ==
- Best Small Car 2011 Over $35,000 - Australia's Best Cars
- Grand Prix award for highest safety performance - Japan New Car Assessment Program* (JNCAP)
- Winner (Hybrids) - Asian Auto Fuel Efficiency Awards 2011

== Sales ==
Global sales of Lexus CT 200h reached 267,000 units through March 2016, making the CT the second best selling Lexus hybrid after the Lexus RX 400h/RX 450h. CT 200h sales represent 26.7 percent of the one million Lexus hybrids delivered since 2005. By March 2022, total sales had reached 380,000.

Calendar year	Canada	Japan	Europe	U.S.
2011	1,350^{*}	20,704	16,980	14,381^{*}
2012	1,640	11,325	15,599	17,673
2013	979		9,406	15,071
2014	1,035		10,340	17,673
2015	814		10,235	14,657
2016	546			8,903
2017	367			4,690
2018				4

^{*}Canadian and U.S. sales began in March 2011.

== Safety ==
ANCAP test results Lexus CT200h all variants (2011)
Test	Score
Overall	5 /5 stars
Frontal offset	15.13/16
Side impact	16/16
Pole	2/2
Seat belt reminders	3/3
Whiplash protection	Good
Pedestrian protection	Adequate
Electronic stability control	Standard

ANCAP test results Lexus CT200h all variants (2013)
Test	Score
Overall	5 /5 stars
Frontal offset	15.13/16
Side impact	16/16
Pole	2/2
Seat belt reminders	3/3
Whiplash protection	Good
Pedestrian protection	Adequate
Electronic stability control	Standard

ANCAP test results Lexus CT200h all variants (2017)
Test	Score
Overall	5 /5 stars
Frontal offset	15.13/16
Side impact	16/16
Pole	2/2
Seat belt reminders	3/3
Whiplash protection	Good
Pedestrian protection	Adequate
Electronic stability control	Standard
