= Ford Edge =

Mid-size crossover SUV produced by Ford

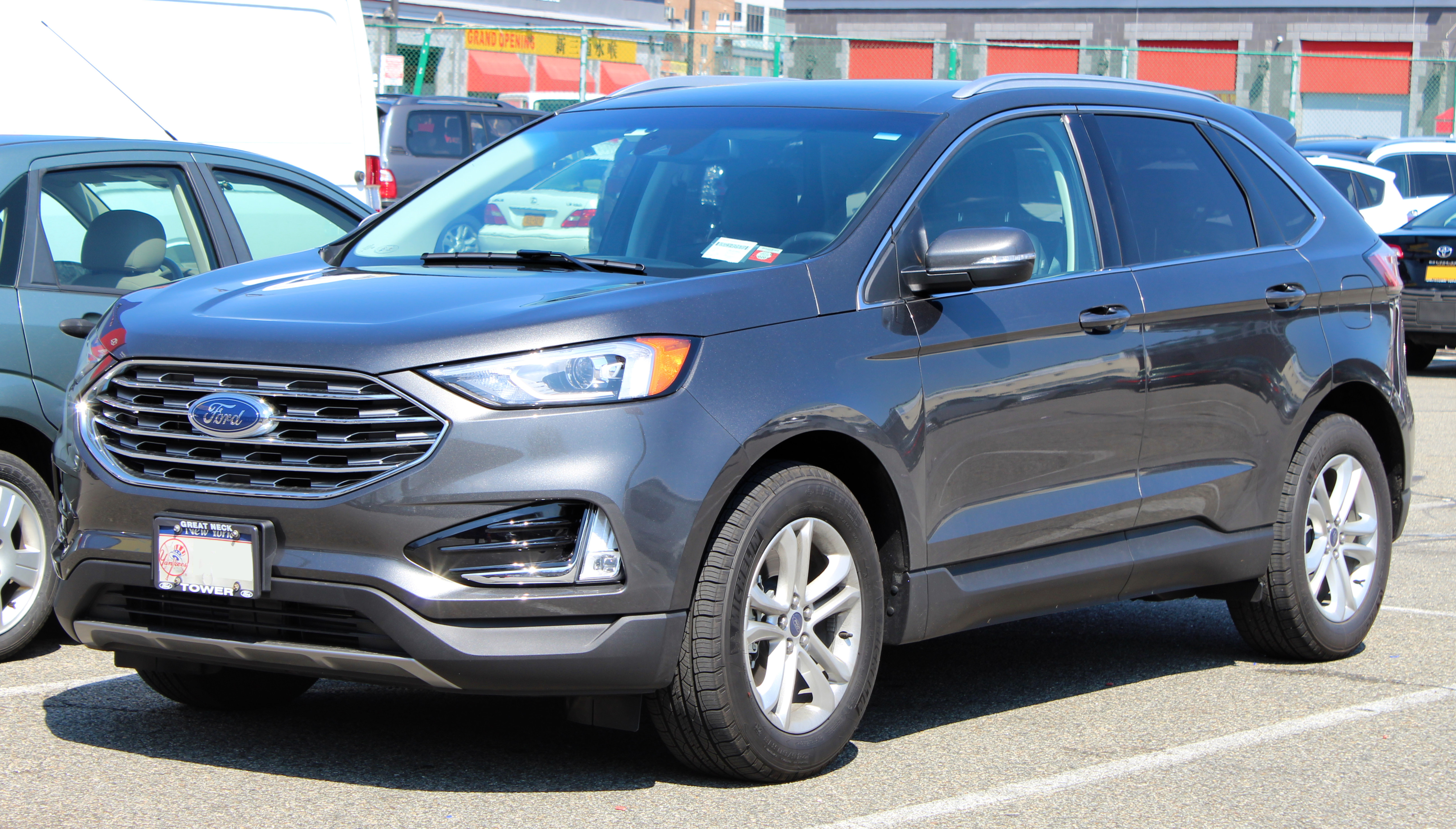
- 2019 Ford Edge SEL EcoBoost AWD (US)

Overview
- Manufacturer: Ford
- Production: 2006–present
- Model years: 2007–2024 (CAN/US); 2016–2021 (Europe); 2015–2019 (UK)

Body and chassis
- Class: Mid-size crossover SUV
- Body style: 5-door SUV
- Layout: Front-engine, front-wheel drive / all-wheel drive

The Ford Edge is a crossover SUV manufactured and marketed by the Ford Motor Company introduced for the 2007 model year as the first mid-size CUV marketed by Ford in North America. Deriving its name from a trim package of the Ford Ranger, the Ford Edge is positioned between the Ford Escape and the Ford Explorer within the Ford product line.

Production of the North American Edge ended in April 2024, with the third generation Edge (dubbed the Edge L), launched in 2023, being produced and sold exclusively in China.

Sharing its underpinnings with the Ford Fusion sedan, Ford also marketed a rebadged variant as the Lincoln MKX (since 2019, the Lincoln Nautilus). The second generation is also marketed by Ford of Europe, positioned between the Kuga (Escape) and the Explorer PHEV.

Manufacturing of the first two generations took place at Oakville Assembly (Oakville, Ontario) alongside the Nautilus.

== First generation (U387; 2007) ==
First generation
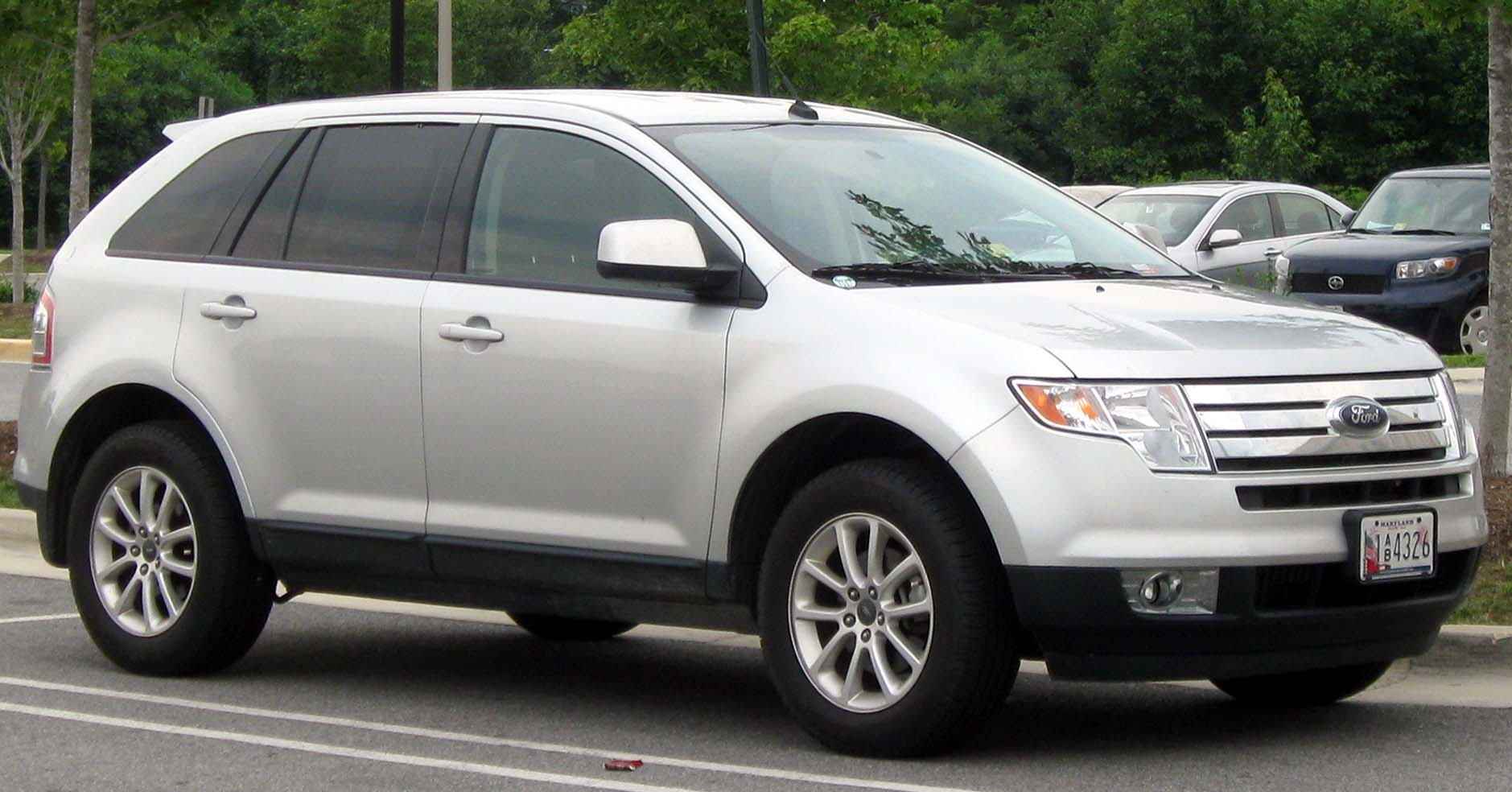

Overview
- Model code: U387
- Production: January 2006–2014
- Model years: 2007–2014
- Assembly: Canada: Oakville, Ontario (Oakville Ford Assembly Plant)
- Designer: Sid Ramnarace

Body and chassis
- Platform: Ford CD3 platform
- Related: Lincoln MKX

Powertrain
- Engine: Gasoline: 2.0 L EcoBoost turbo I4; 3.5 L Duratec V6; 3.7 L Duratec V6
- Transmission: 6-speed 6F50 automatic

Dimensions
- Wheelbase: 111.2 in (2,824 mm)
- Length: 2007–2010: 185.7 in (4,717 mm); 2011–2014: 184.2 in (4,679 mm)
- Width: 2007–2010: 75.8 in (1,925 mm); 2011–2014: 76.0 in (1,930 mm)
- Height: 67.0 in (1,702 mm)
- Curb weight: 4,291 lb (1,946 kg) (FWD); 4,234 lb (1,921 kg) (AWD)

The first-generation Edge debuted at the 2006 North American International Auto Show in Detroit, with production starting in January 2006 as a 2007 model year.

=== Trim levels ===
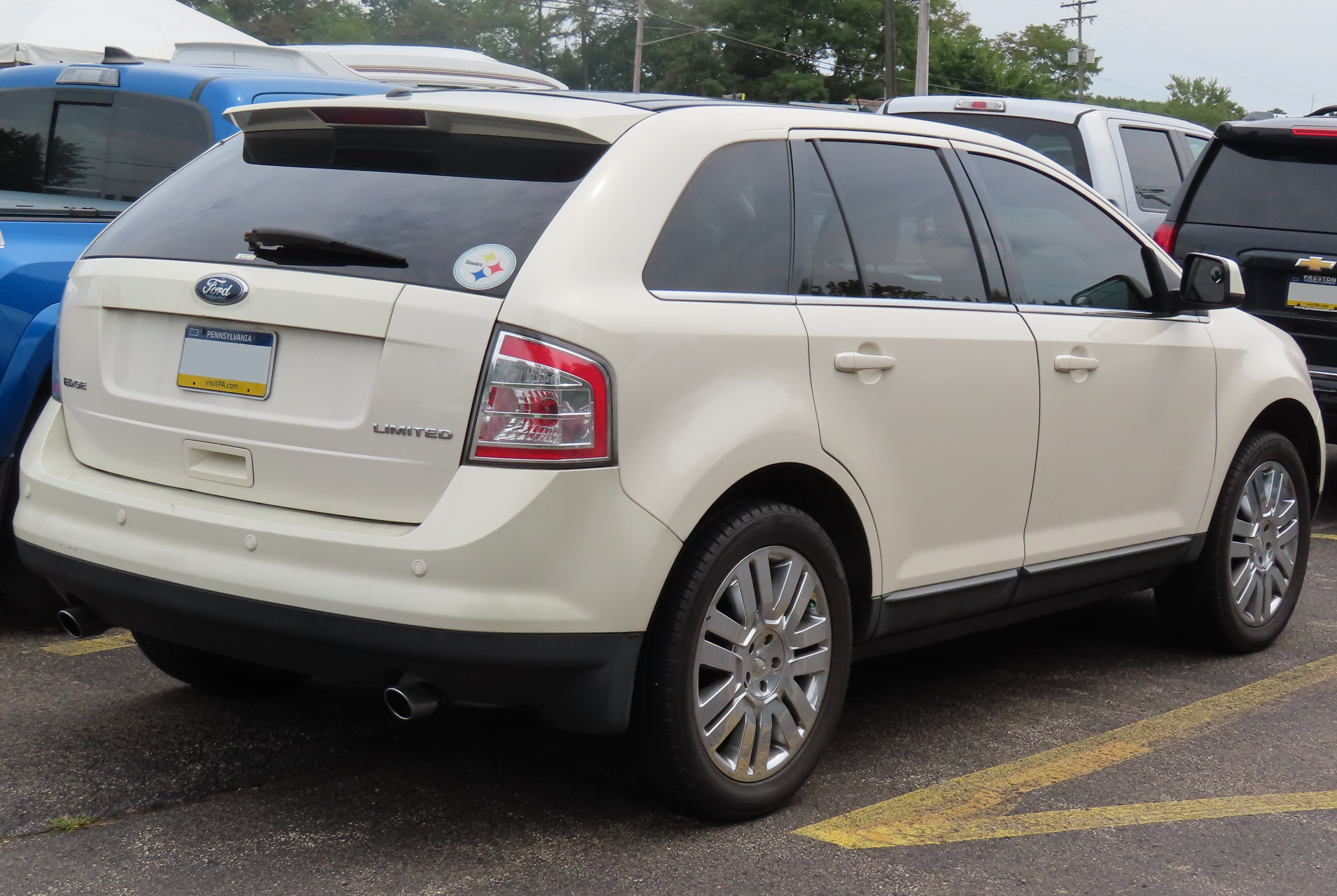
2008 Ford Edge Limited

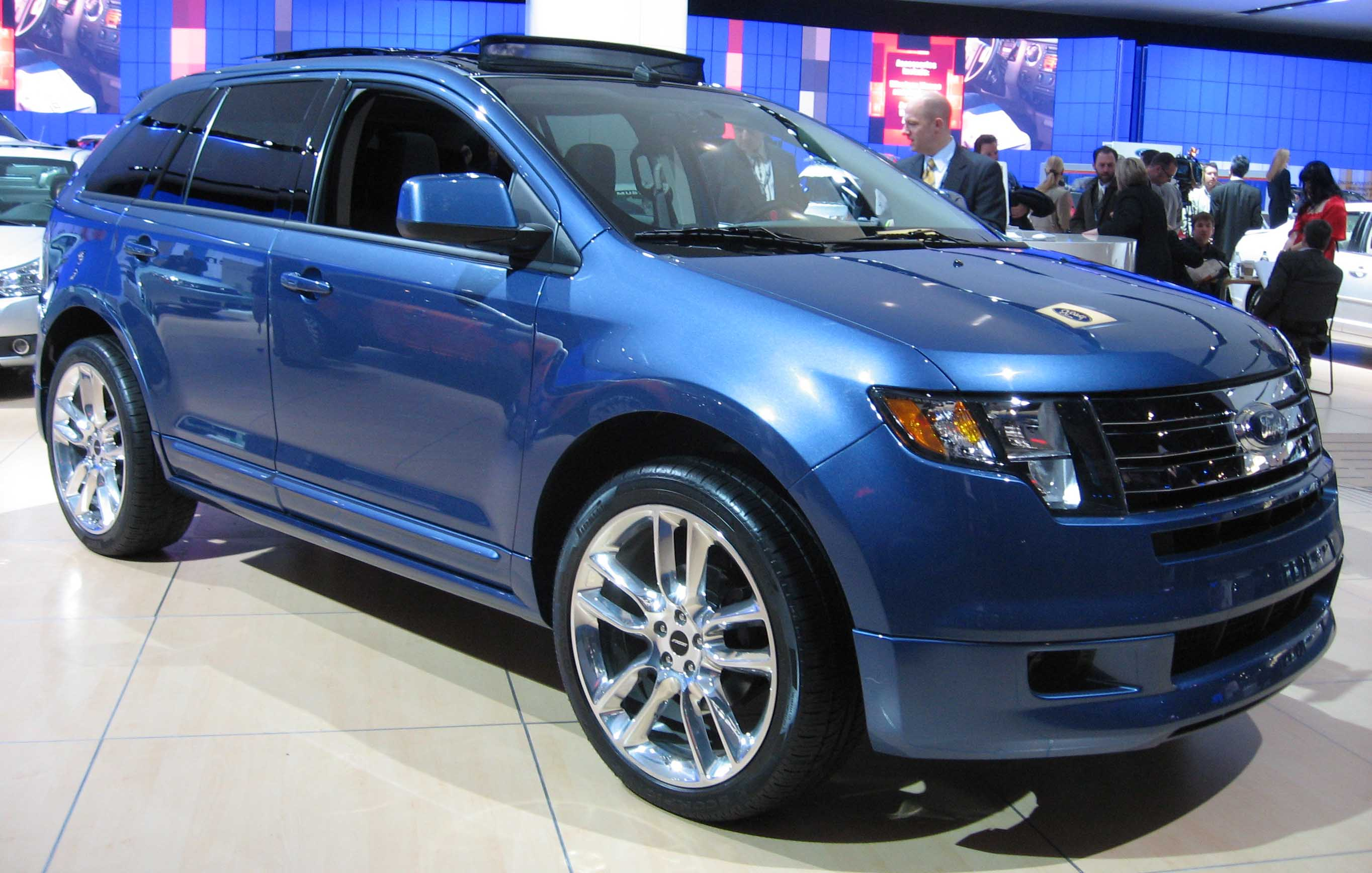
2009 Ford Edge Sport

The SE includes cloth seats, single-zone manual air conditioning, AM/FM stereo with single-disc CD/MP3 player, and 17-inch painted aluminum wheels.

The SEL includes unique cloth seats, six-way power driver's seat, premium AM/FM stereo with six-disc in-dash CD/MP3 player, leather-wrapped steering wheel with secondary audio controls, and 18-inch painted aluminum wheels.

The SEL Plus, later known as the Limited includes leather-trimmed seats, and optionally, six-way power front passenger fold-flat seat, EasyFold second-row seat back release, dual-zone electronic automatic temperature control, SYNC in-car connectivity system, and 18-inch premium chrome-clad aluminum wheels. The Limited trim level replaced the SEL Plus in 2008.

The Sport trim level debuted at the 2008 Chicago Auto Show, with sales beginning as a 2009 model. The trim level includes leather-trimmed with grey faux-suede inserts, reclining 60/40 fold-flat seats with center fold-down armrest, second-row seat back release (marketed as EasyFold), premium AM/FM stereo with six-disc in-dash CD/MP3 player, SYNC in-car connectivity system, large-diameter chrome exhaust tips, 20-inch premium chrome-clad aluminum wheels, all body-colored trim and optional 22-inch wheels.

=== Specifications ===
==== Engines ====
| Type | Model years | Power at rpm | Torque at rpm |
|---|---|---|---|
| 3,496 cc (213.3 cu in) 3.5 Duratec V6 | 2007–2010 | 265 bhp (198 kW) at 6,250 | 250 lb⋅ft (339 N⋅m) at 4,500 |
| 3,496 cc (213.3 cu in) 3.5 Duratec V6 | 2011–2014 | 285 bhp (213 kW) at 6,500 | 253 lb⋅ft (343 N⋅m) at 4,000 |
| 3,721 cc (227.1 cu in) 3.7 Duratec V6 | 2011–2014 | 305 bhp (227 kW) at 6,250 | 280 lb⋅ft (380 N⋅m) at 4,500 |
| 1,999 cc (122.0 cu in) EcoBoost I4 | 2011–2014 | 240 bhp (179 kW) at 5,500 | 270 lb⋅ft (366 N⋅m) at 1,750–4,500 |

==== Transmission ====
Standard transmission is a 6F50 6-speed automatic transmission.

==== Safety ====
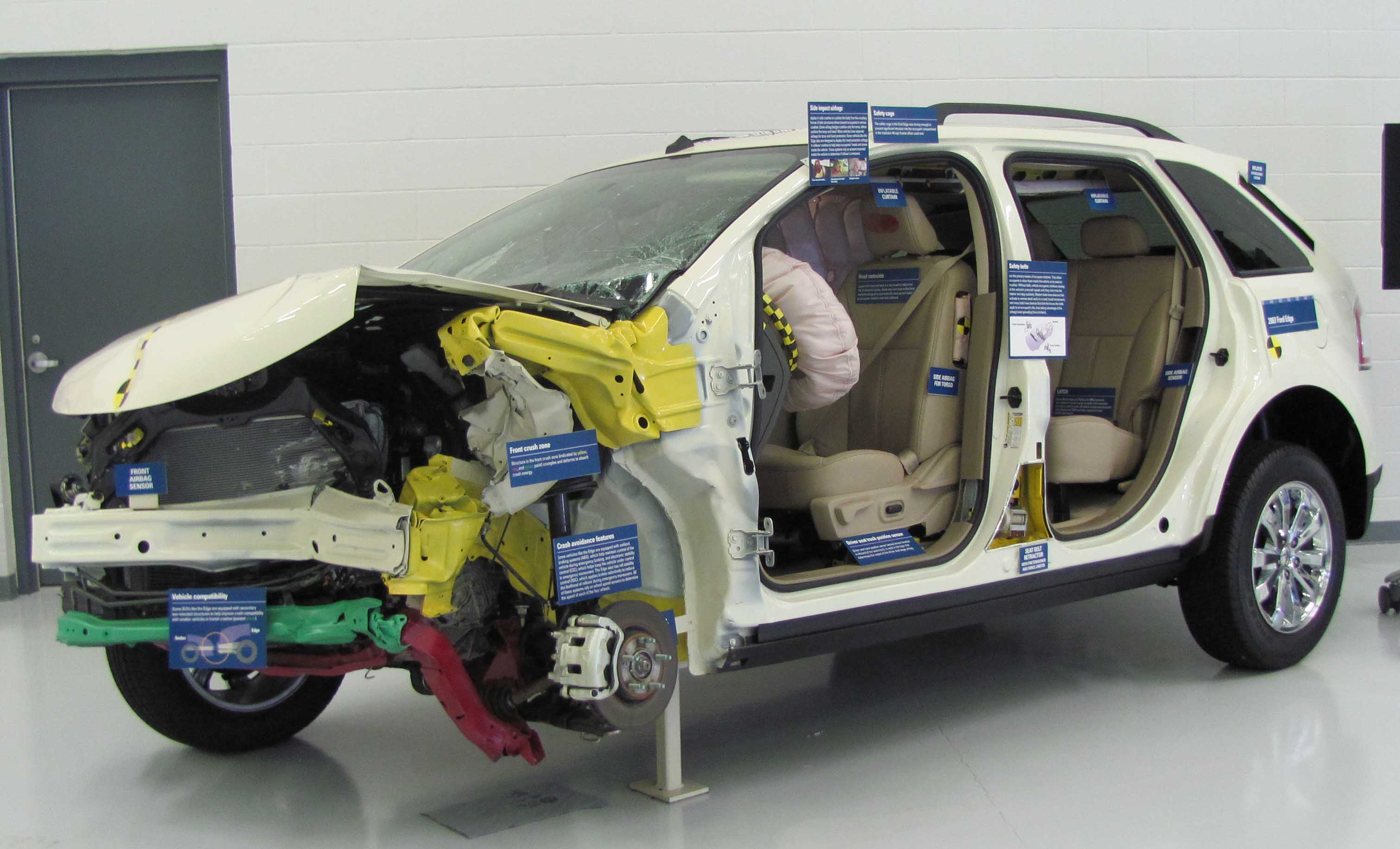
The Insurance Institute for Highway Safety (IIHS) uses its crash-tested 2007 Edge SEL to demonstrate well-designed crash safety.

Safety equipment includes standard dual front airbags, front side-impact airbags, side-curtain airbags, antilock brakes, traction control, electronic stability control, and a tire-pressure monitoring system.

National Highway Traffic Safety Administration (NHTSA) crash test ratings:

- Frontal driver:
- Frontal passenger:
- Side impact:
- Rollover:

NHTSA 2011 Edge FWD crash ratings:

- Frontal driver:
- Frontal passenger:
- Side driver:
- Side passenger:
- Side pole:

=== Awards ===
- Ford Edge was recognized as one of the "Best Cars for Families" in 2007 by AAA and Parents Magazine.
- Edge earned the IIHS "Top Safety Pick" rating for models built after January 2007
- The 3.5-L Duratec 35 V6 was named one of the world's "10 Best Engines" by Ward.
- Ford Edge was named "2007 Urban Truck of the Year" by On Wheels, Inc.
- Edge won the J.D. Power and Associates' 2007 "APEAL Award"

=== HySeries concept ===
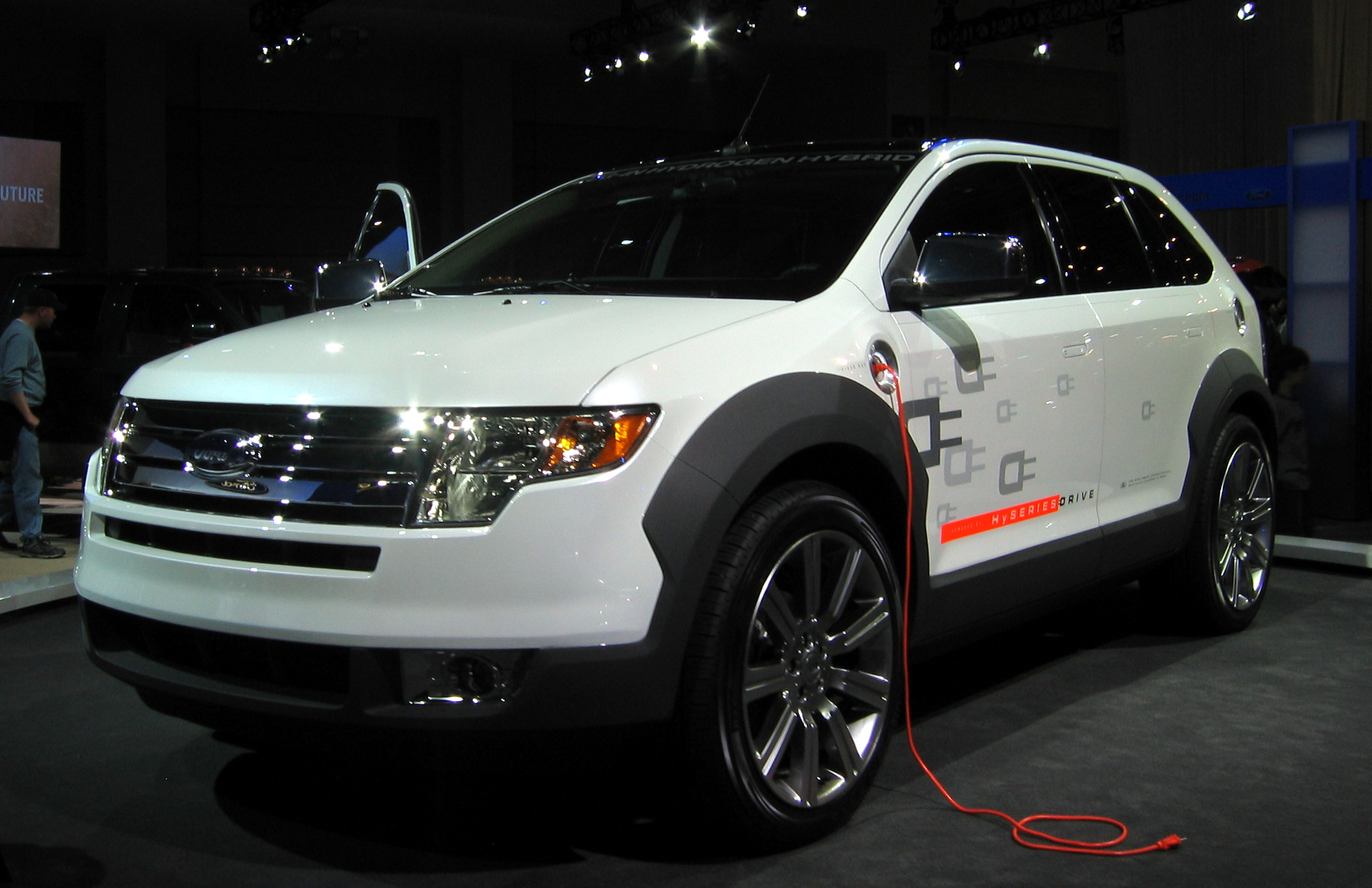
Ford Edge hydrogen fuel cell-electric plug-in hybrid concept

A concept version of the Ford Edge with HySeries Drive was shown at the 2007 Washington Auto Show. This was a hybrid electric vehicle that used hydrogen fuel along with plug-in charging of its lithium-ion battery pack, for a combined range over 320 kilometres (200 mi). The HySeries system was introduced in the Ford Airstream concept from the 2007 Detroit Auto Show.

Ford also planned to produce a gasoline-electric hybrid version of the Edge, to debut for the 2010 model year. The model was expected to use a new hybrid system from Ford, pairing an electric motor with a V6 engine. This hybrid version was later canceled.

=== Facelift (2010) ===
The updated Ford Edge was revealed at the 2010 Chicago Auto Show, with production starting on February 12, 2010, as a 2011 model. Exterior changes include a new front fascia, wheels, and a revised bumper, while the revamped interior features upgraded materials and capacitive touch controls in place of some conventional buttons and switches, which can also be seen on the second-generation Lincoln MKX.

The 2011 Edge was the first vehicle to feature Ford Sync 2, or MyFord Touch, as an option (standard on Limited models).

Engines offered for the updated first generation: a 2.0 L EcoBoost I4 engine, a 3.5 L Duratec with Ti-VCT making 285 hp (213 kW) and 253 lb⋅ft (343 N⋅m) of torque, and the Sport model had the same 3.7 L Duratec engine as the 2011 Lincoln MKX with 305 hp (227 kW) and 280 lb⋅ft (380 N⋅m) of torque. The turbocharger in the new 2.0-L engine is designed for 150,000 miles or 10 years.

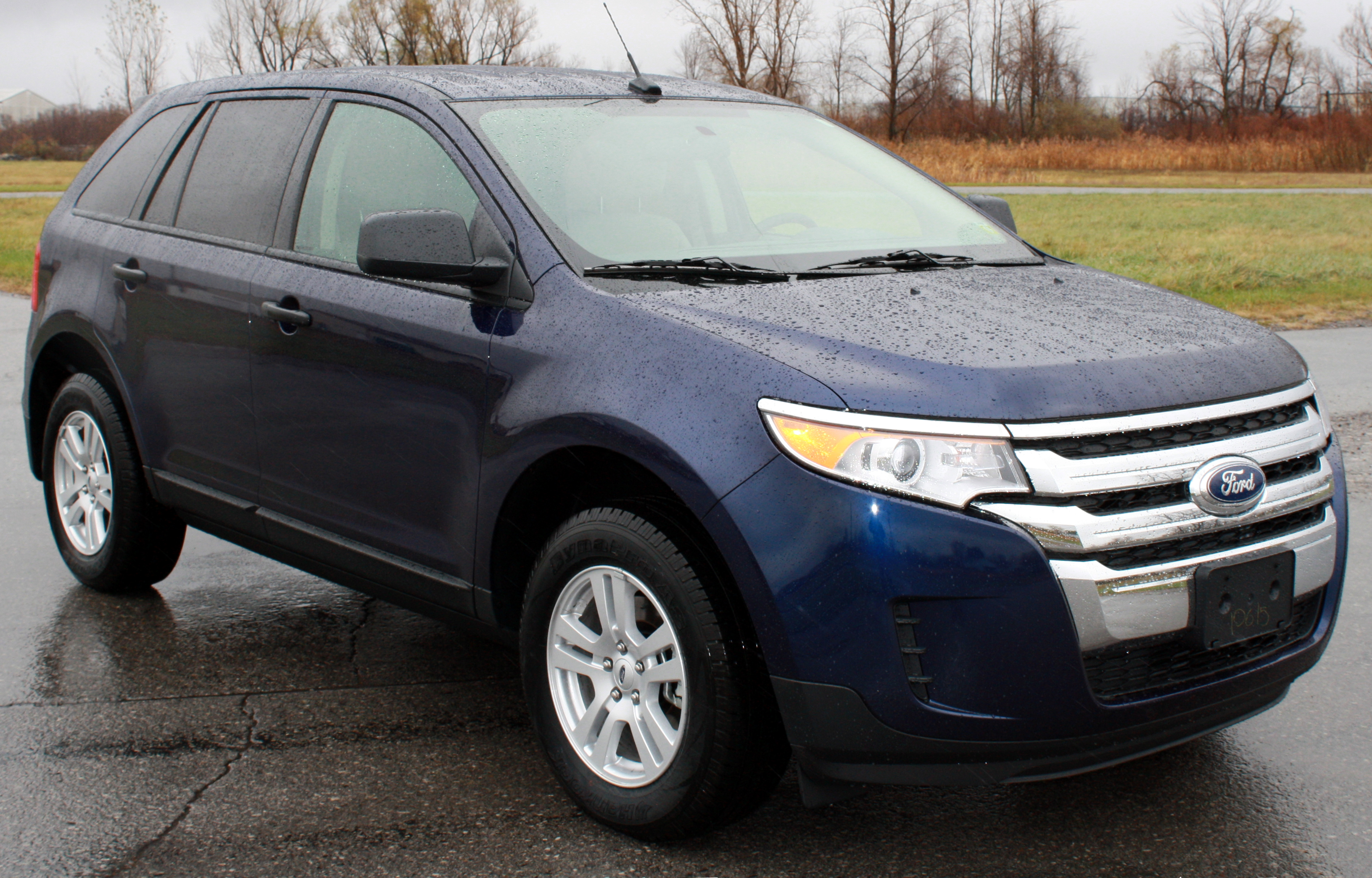
2011 refresh (US)

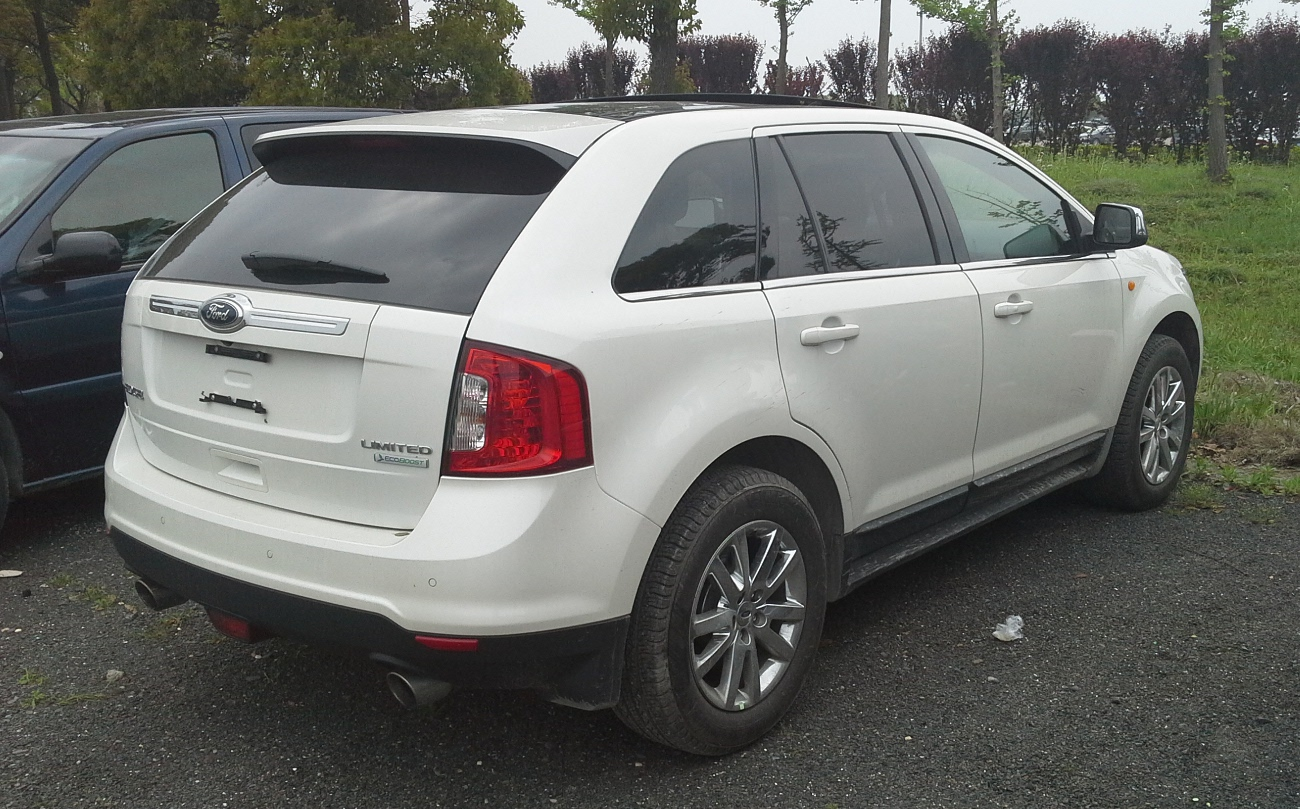
Rear view (China)

==== Trim levels ====
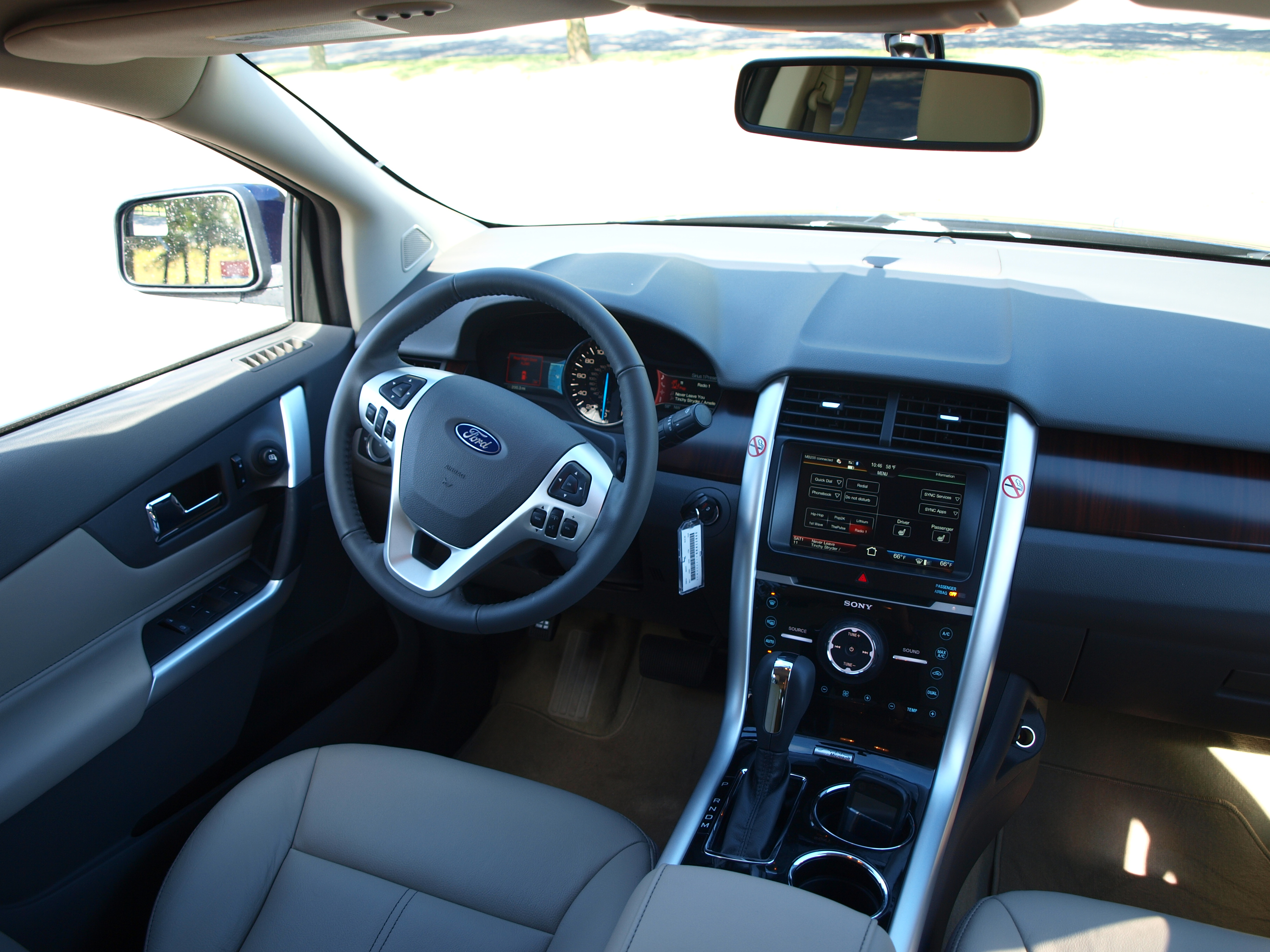
2011 Ford Edge with MyFord Touch

In the American Range: The SE includes cloth-trimmed seats, single-zone manual air-conditioning, steering wheel controls, and 17-inch painted aluminum wheels.

The SEL includes everything in the SE plus unique cloth-trimmed seats, six-way power driver's seat, dual-zone electronic automatic temperature controls, leather-wrapped steering wheel with cruise control, five-way switch pads and secondary audio controls, 18-inch painted aluminum wheels, reverse sensing system, and supplemental parking lamps.

The Limited includes everything in the SEL plus leather-trimmed seats, 10-way heated power driver's seat, Sony audio system with HD radio with 12 speakers in 10 locations, MyFord Touch with two driver-configurable 4.2 in (110 mm) color LCD screens in cluster and 8 in (200 mm) color LCD screen in center stack, Ford Sync including media hub with two USB ports, SD card reader and video input jacks, 18-inch chrome-clad aluminum wheels with optional 20-inch chrome-clad aluminum wheels, rear view camera, and six-way heated power, fold-flat front passenger seat. In Israel, this trim is called SEL Plus.

Limited options include HID headlamps, a blind-spot information system, and adaptive cruise control.

The Sport includes the 3.7 L Twin-independent Variable Cam Timing V6 engine from the Mustang, six-speed SelectShift automatic transmission with paddle activation, unique charcoal black leather-trimmed seats with Silver Smoke Metallic inserts, 22-inch polished aluminum wheel with Tuxedo Black spoke accents, body-color front and rear lower fascia, 4-inch chrome oval dual exhaust tips, and body-color side lower cladding and rocker molding.

== Second generation (CD539; 2015) ==
Second generation
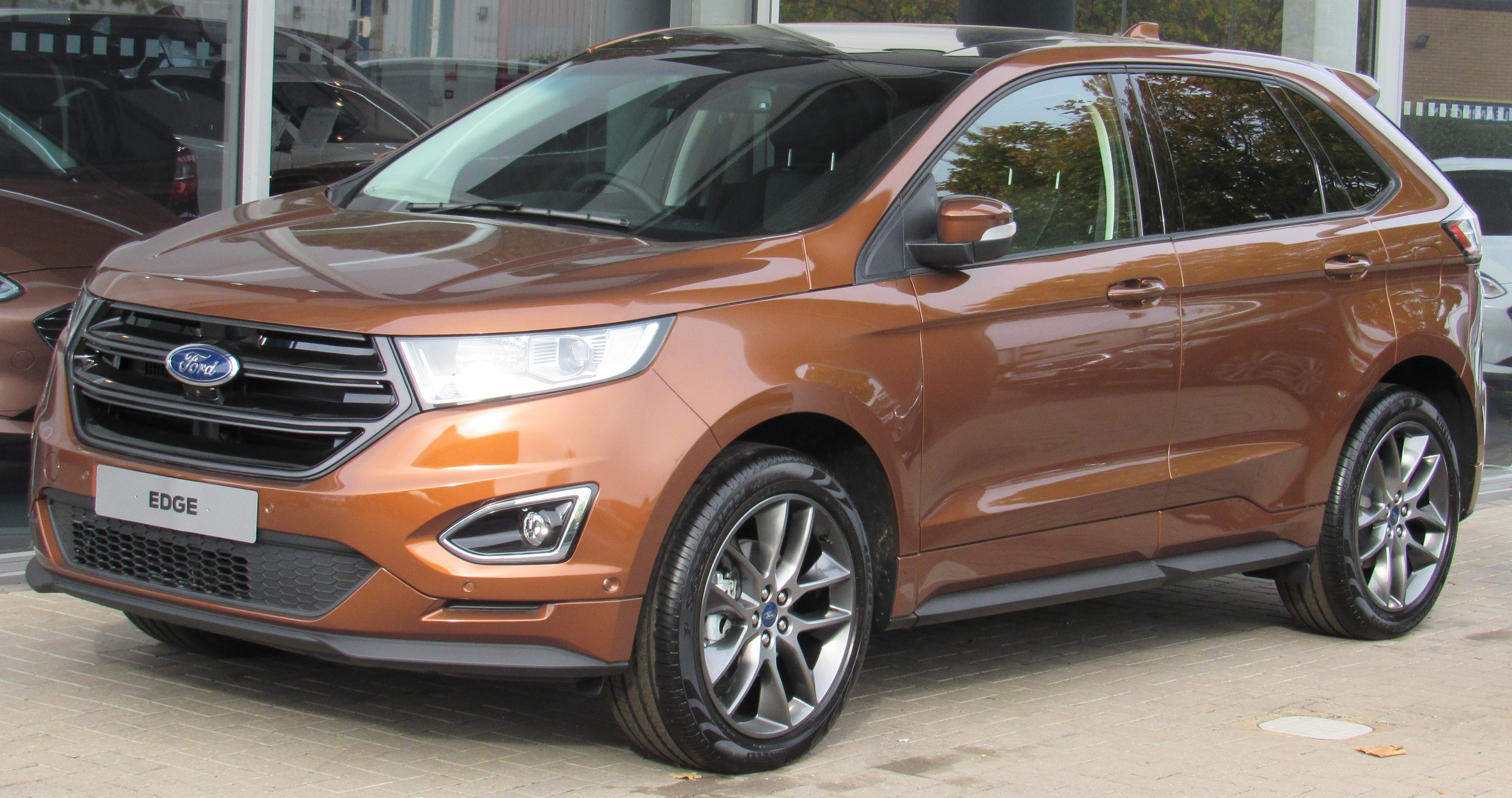
- 2017 Ford Edge (Europe)

Overview
- Model code: CD539
- Also called: Ford Endura (Australia & New Zealand); Ford Edge Plus (China)
- Production: 2014–2024
- Model years: 2015–2024 (North America)
- Assembly: Canada: Oakville, Ontario (Oakville Ford Assembly Plant); China: Hangzhou, Zhejiang (Changan Ford)
- Designer: Kevin George

Body and chassis
- Platform: Ford CD4 platform
- Related: Lincoln MKX (second generation); Lincoln Nautilus (first generation); Ford S-Max (second generation); Ford Galaxy (third generation)

Powertrain
- Engine: Gasoline: 2.0 L EcoBoost I4 turbo; 2.7 L EcoBoost V6 turbo; 3.5 L Duratec V6; Diesel: 2.0 L Duratorq I4 (2016–2018); 2.0 L EcoBlue I4 (2018–2024)
- Transmission: 6-speed 6F automatic 6-speed manual (Europe only, diesel); 6-speed PowerShift dual-clutch transmission 7-speed automatic 8-speed automatic

Dimensions
- Wheelbase: 112.2 in (2,850 mm)
- Length: 188.1 in (4,779 mm); 192.0 in (4,878 mm) (three-row version)
- Width: 75.9 in (1,928 mm)
- Height: 68.6 in (1,742 mm)
- Curb weight: 3,912 lb (1,774 kg) (FWD); 4,060 lb (1,840 kg) (AWD)

Chronology
- Predecessor: Ford Territory (Australasia)

For 2015, the Ford Edge was redesigned with a new Taurus and Explorer-like grille, new headlights, LED combination taillights, increased interior room, and a rear-view camera. This generation of the Edge comes with a standard EcoBoost engine, the all-new 2.0 L (only the displacement and bore-center spacing carry over), which has a new twin-scroll turbocharger to boost low-end torque figures. Unlike the previous 2.0 L EcoBoost, the 2015 generation has a towing capacity of 3500 lb and is available with all-wheel drive. The mid specification engine is a 3.5 L V6, with slightly reduced power output. The highest engine in the range, powering Sport models, is the new 2.7 L twin-turbo EcoBoost V6.

For the first time, Ford marketed the Edge in European markets (as part of the company's "One Ford" strategy); it sits above the Ford Kuga. Gasoline engines are not sold in Europe; instead, this market receives either of two turbo-charged Duratorq diesel engines as used in other Ford Europe products such as the Ford Mondeo. Both engines are mated to an all-wheel drive system as standard; no option for two-wheel drive is available. The two engines are rated at 180 hp and 210 hp. Which output the customer receives is entirely dependent on the transmission choice, with a six-speed manual as standard mated to the 180-hp unit. A six-speed PowerShift automatic dual-clutch transmission option was available, mated to the 210-hp unit.

Ford marketed the Edge in Europe as a premium large crossover with only high-end trims and diesel engines at prices 50% higher than in North America. Due to low sales, the model was limited in 2019 to only a few countries, with the last stock sold in early 2021.

Production of the North American-market second generation Ford Edge ended on April 26, 2024, without a direct successor.

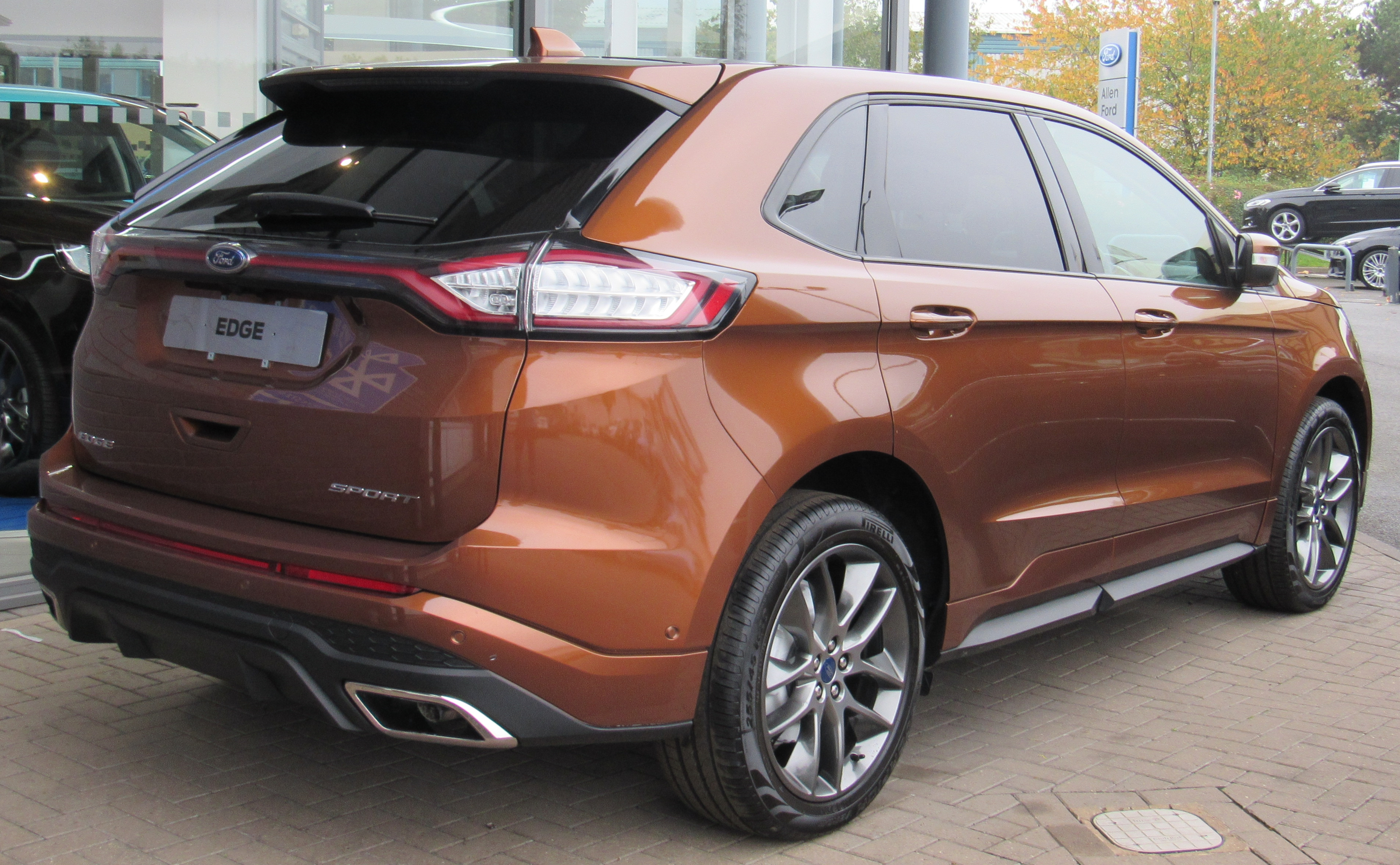
Rear view

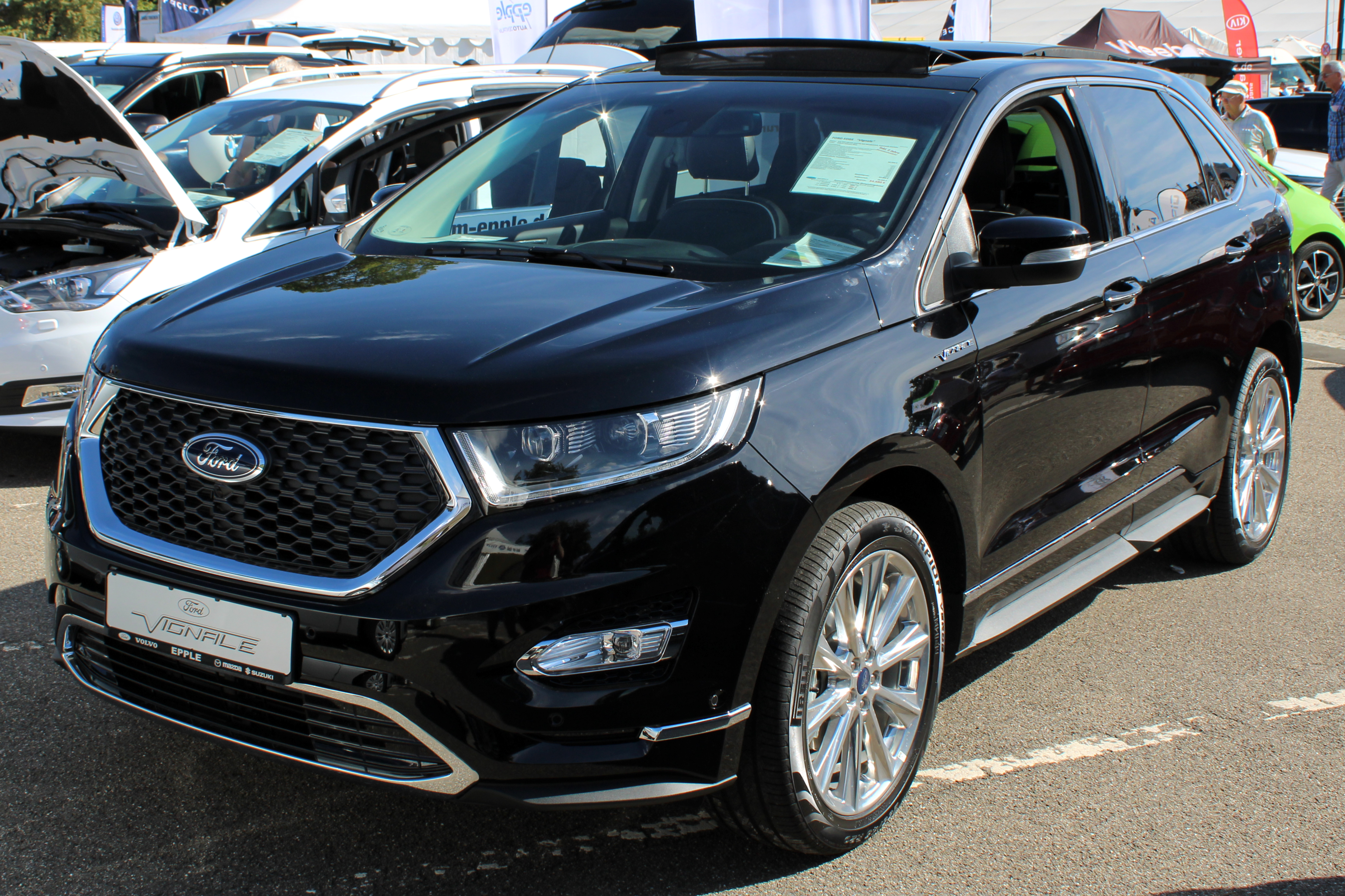
Edge Vignale

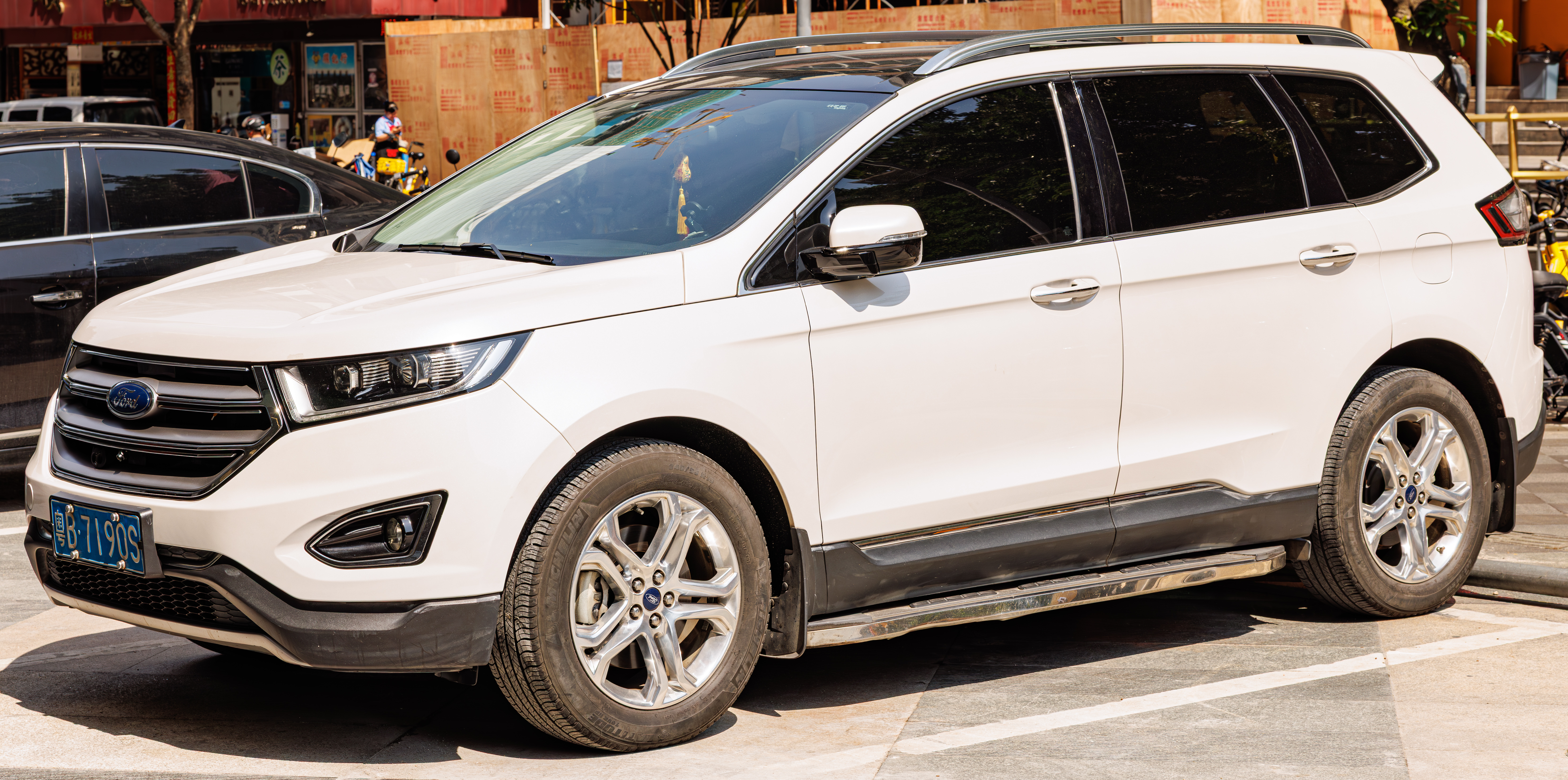
The longer three-row Edge is available exclusively in China.

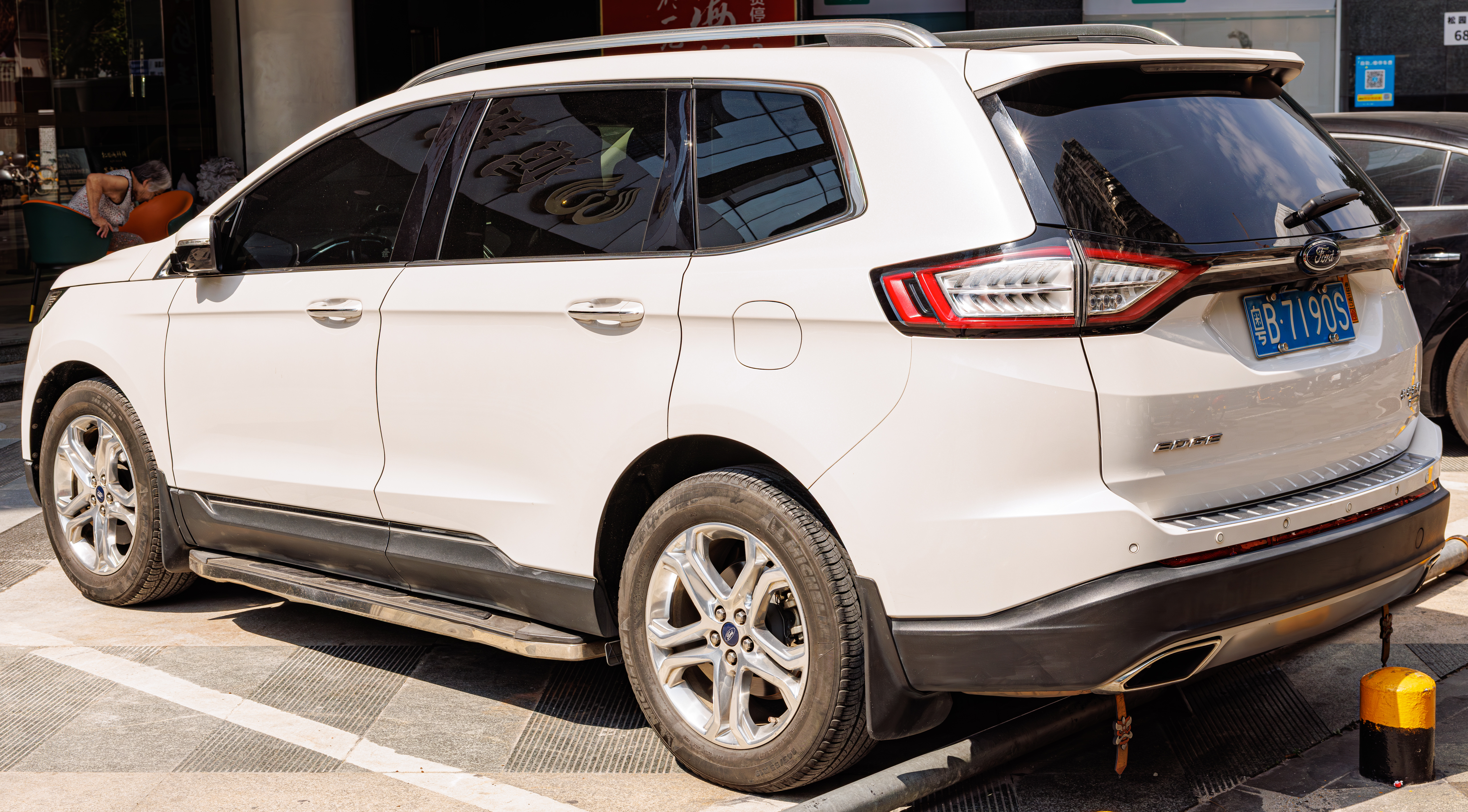
The three-row Edge, rear

=== Facelift (2018) ===
The facelifted Edge was first shown at the 2018 Detroit Auto Show in the United States, where the Ford Edge ST was also introduced.

The Edge (alongside the Lincoln MKX) received a mid-cycle facelift for the 2019 model year, with a revised front grille, aluminum-alloy wheel options, exterior and interior color combinations, as well as a 12-speaker B&O Play surround-sound system replacing the Sony system. All models received a new Ford 8F35 eight-speed automatic transmission (featuring automatic stop-start technology), which also allowed the base 2.0 L EcoBoost turbocharged four-cylinder engine to gain a 5-horsepower (3.7 kW) boost, and improved EPA fuel economy.

With the launch of the 2018 model in Australia (February 2019 in New Zealand), the Edge is sold as the Ford Endura, and is the successor to the Ford Territory. In Australia, the Endura was made available in Trend, ST-Line, and Titanium trim levels. The Endura was discontinued in Australia by the end of 2020. It had been discontinued in New Zealand prior to this.

The 2019 Ford Edge was offered in nine exterior colors, some of which were new for 2019.

In addition, the 2019 Edge offered three new safety technologies:

- Post-collision braking automatically applies brake pressure when a collision event is detected.
- Evasive steering assist helps drivers in steering around stopped or slower vehicles to avoid a possible collision.
- Adaptive cruise control with stop-and-go lane centering allows the vehicle to maintain a comfortable driving distance and helps reduce stress during longer drives.

The 2019 Edge made its debut at the 2018 North American International Auto Show in Detroit, and went on sale in the second quarter of 2018 as an early 2019 model year vehicle.

For the 2020 model year, dual-zone automatic climate control was included on all trims. However, the CD player was removed.

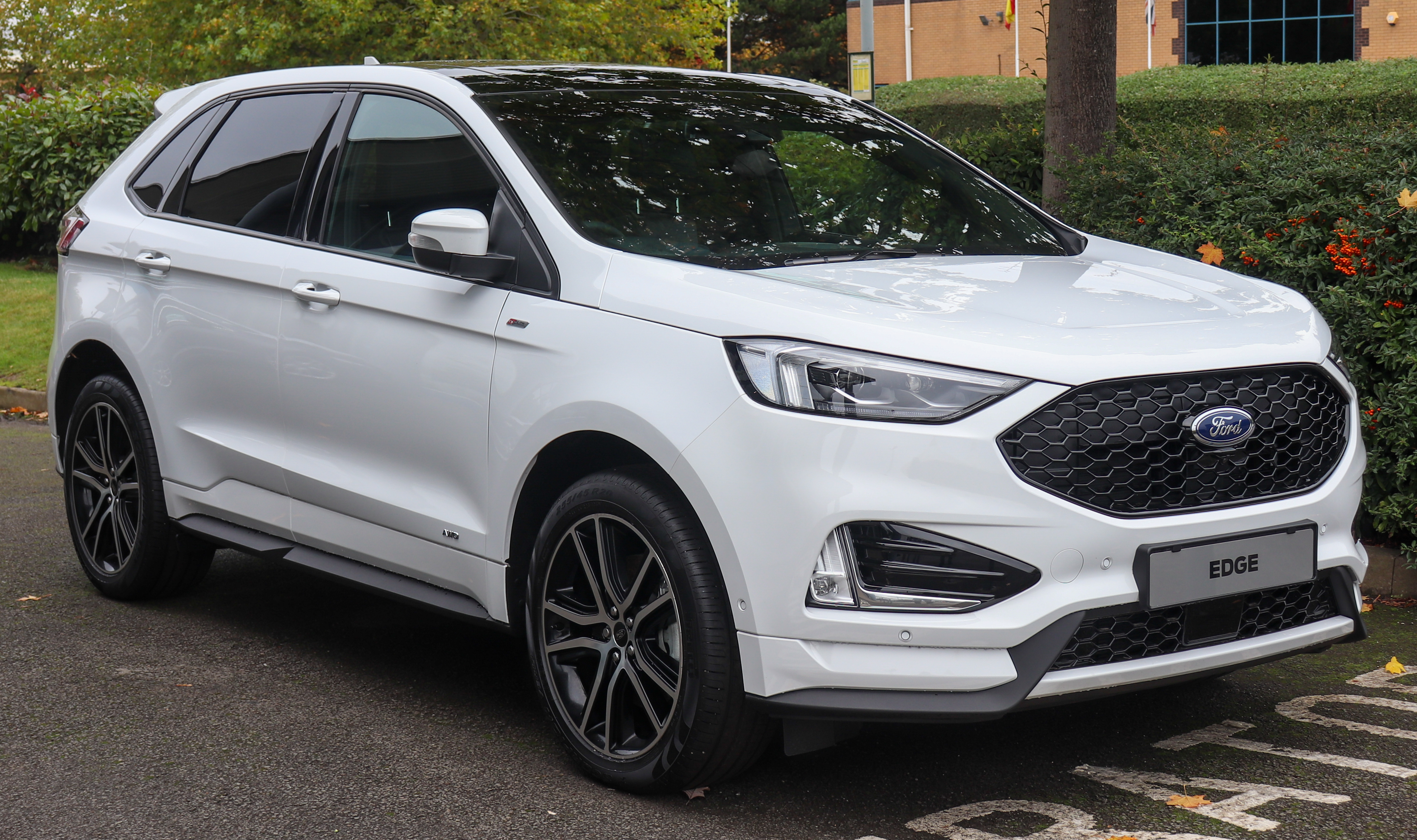
2019 Ford Edge ST-Line (UK; facelift)

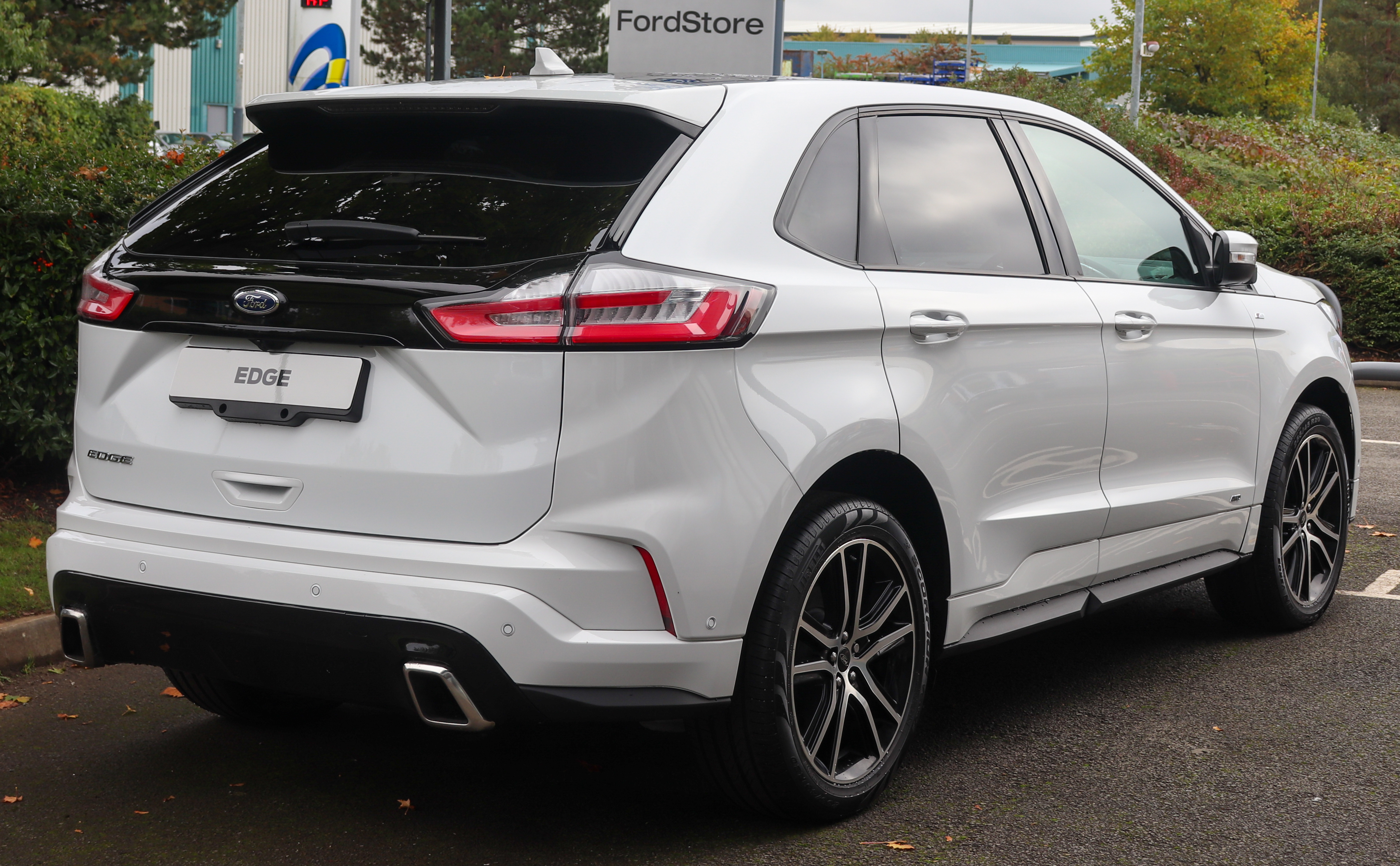
2019 Ford Edge ST-Line (UK; facelift)

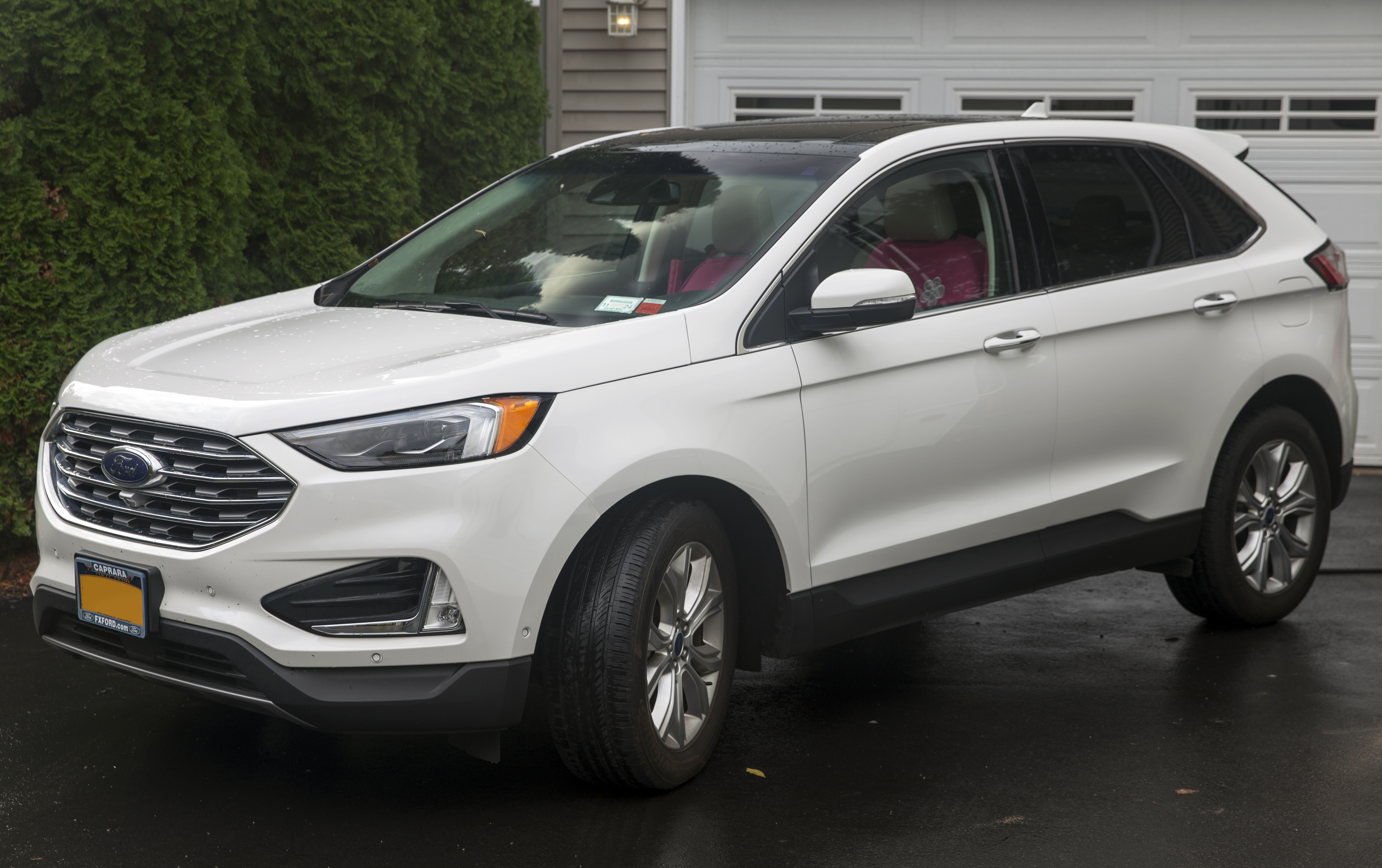
2020 Ford Edge Titanium (US; facelift)

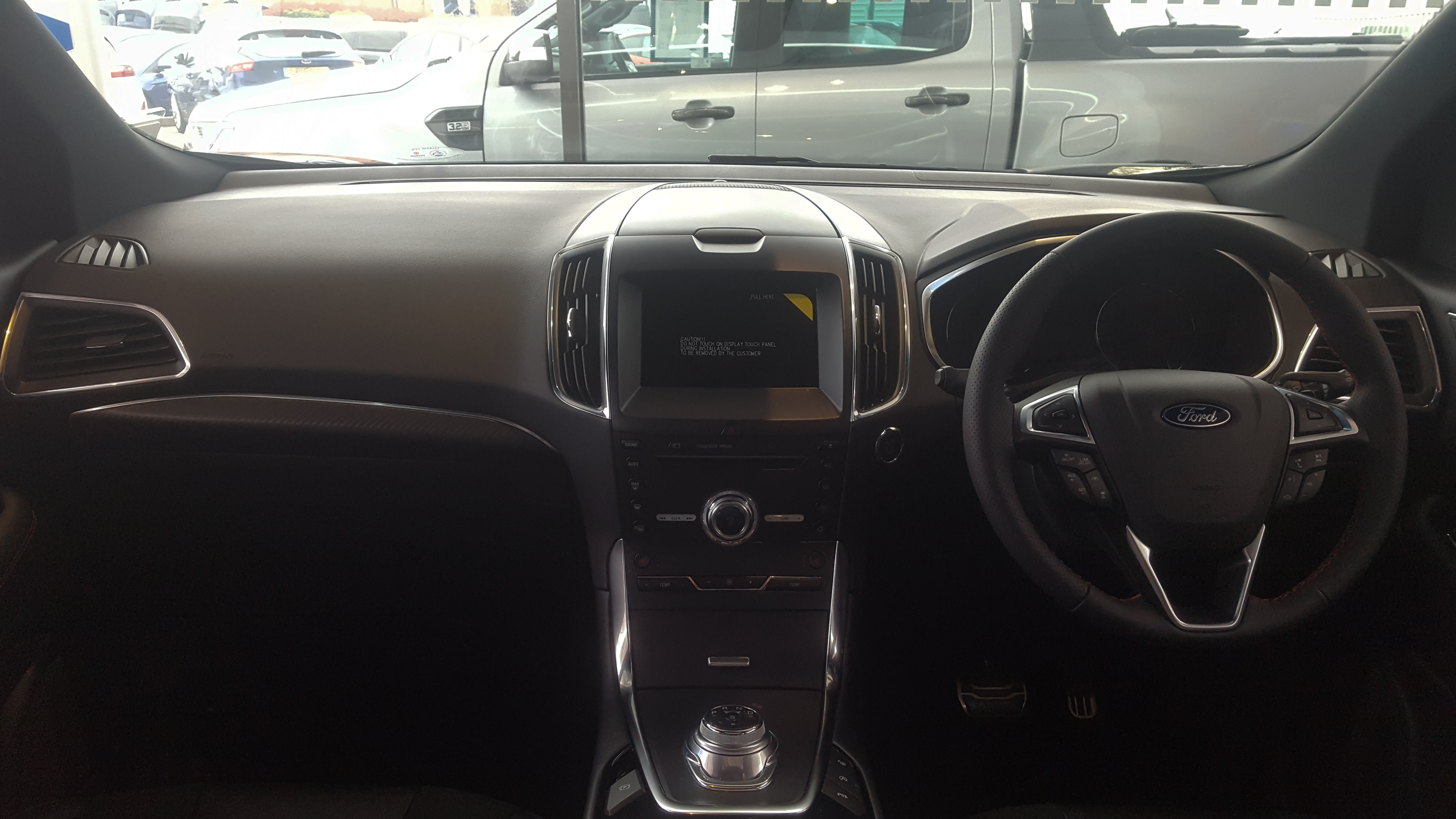
Interior (facelift)

=== Edge Plus (China, 2021 facelift) ===
The Edge in China was facelifted with the rest of the world in 2019 while receiving another facelift for the 2021 model year exclusively for the Chinese three-row Edge called the Ford Edge Plus. The Edge Plus features a slightly redesigned exterior and a different interior design. The interior features two new displays measuring 8 and 13.2 inches across and a new squared-off multi-function steering wheel. The updated center console houses both the climate controls and the air vents, while a cover below conceals a power socket, a single USB port and a wireless charger. The Edge Plus is powered by the previous 2.0-liter turbo-inline-4 engine producing 245 PS (242 hp; 180 kW) and 390 N⋅m (39.8 kg⋅m; 288 lb⋅ft), which links to an eight-speed automatic transmission. Both FWD and AWD are offered.

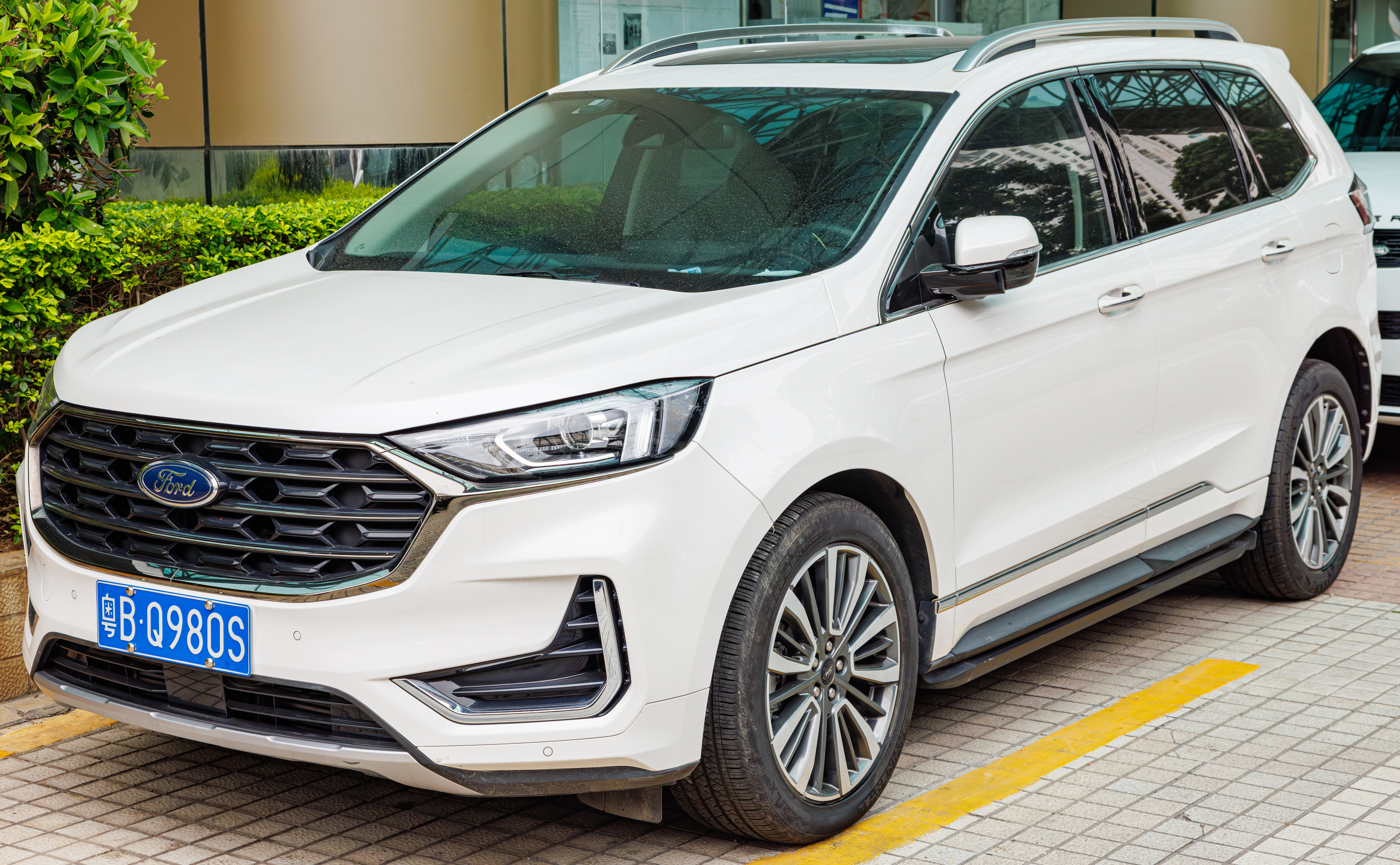
Ford Edge Plus (China; 2021 facelift)

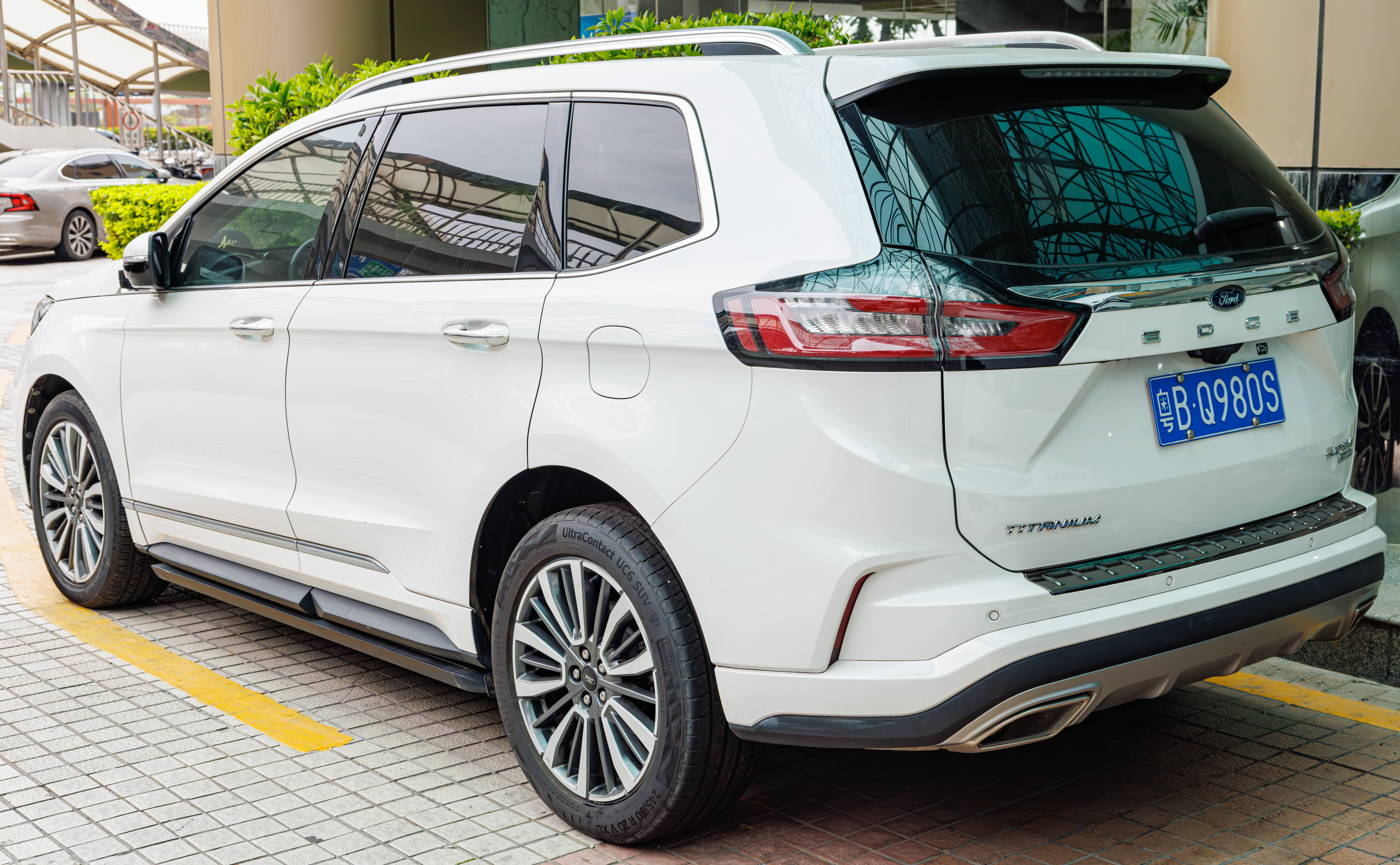
Ford Edge Plus (China; 2021 facelift)

=== 2021 model year changes ===
For the 2021 model year, the Ford Edge gained a standard 12 in (300 mm), tablet-style touchscreen infotainment system screen (Ford Sync 4), with wireless Apple CarPlay and Android Auto smartphone integration, as well as standard SiriusXM satellite radio with 360L. A new "ST-Line" trim, based on the mid-level Edge SEL, added ST-inspired exterior and interior styling, a unique ActiveX (leatherette)-trimmed interior, and unique black-finished aluminum-alloy wheels, but is powered by the base 2.0L EcoBoost four-cylinder engine mated to an eight-speed automatic transmission. The Edge Titanium gained a new Titanium Elite Package, which added a unique interior color scheme, model-specific exterior styling cues, and larger tires with unique aluminum-alloy wheels.

=== Edge ST ===
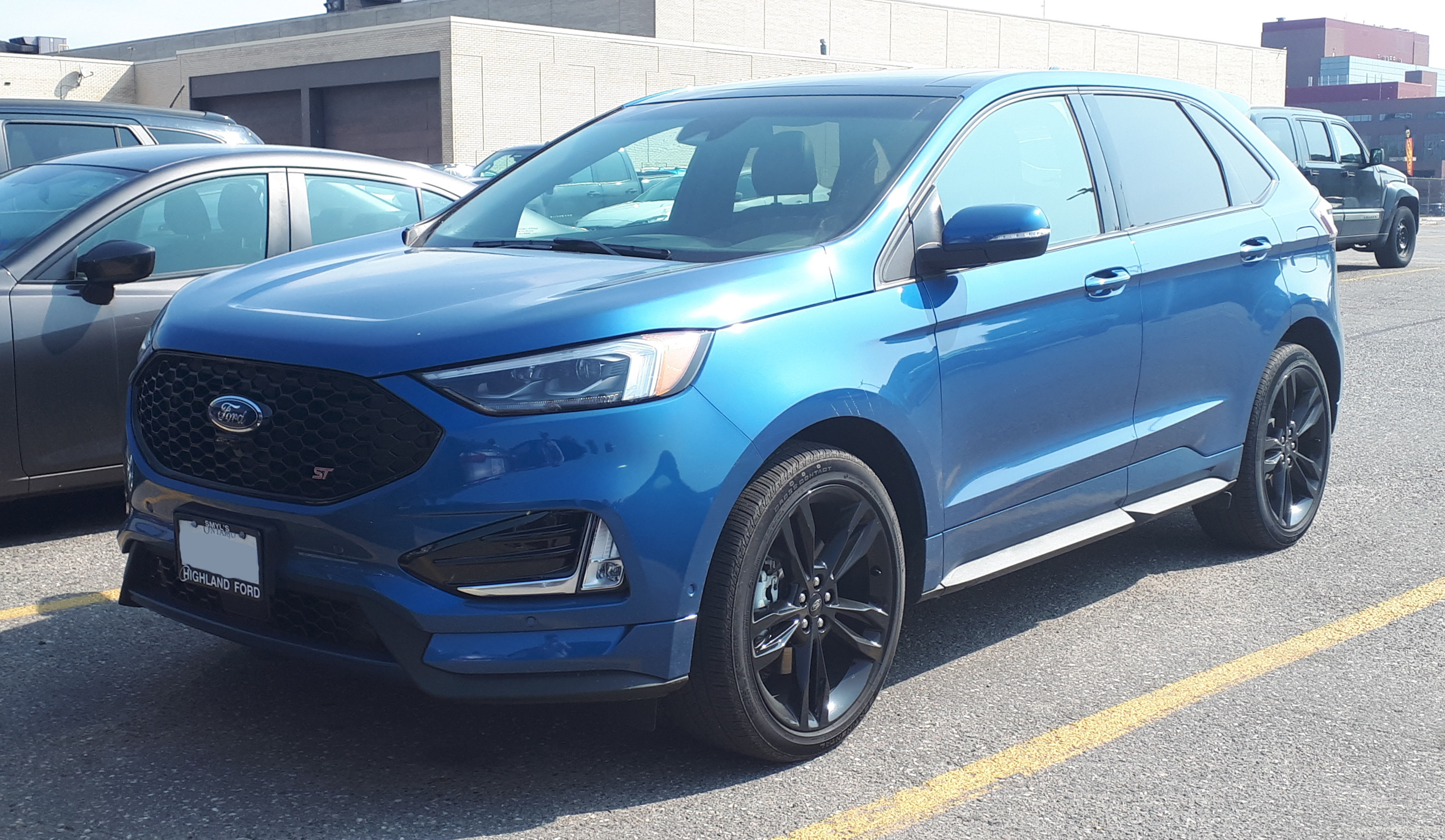
Ford Edge ST (Canada)

Ford also offered a new model of the Edge, the ST, instead of the Sport as the top trim level for the line. It features a 2.7 L EcoBoost twin-turbocharged V6 engine producing 335 horsepower (250 kW), a modest 20 horsepower (15 kW) increase over the 2018 Sport, which used the same engine. ST styling includes a dark-finished mesh front grille, aluminum-alloy wheels, and unique interior.

=== Powertrain ===
| Type | Model years | Power at rpm | Torque at rpm | Notes |
|---|---|---|---|---|
| 1,999 cc (122.0 cu in) Ecoboost I4 | 2015–2024 | 245 bhp (183 kW) at 5,500 rpm | 275 lb⋅ft (373 N⋅m) at 3,000 rpm | |
| 3,496 cc (213.3 cu in) Duratec 35 V6 | 2015–2018 | 280 bhp (209 kW) at 6,500 rpm | 250 lb⋅ft (339 N⋅m) at 4,000 rpm | |
| 2,720 cc (166 cu in) 2.7 Ecoboost V6 | 2015–2018 | 315 bhp (235 kW) at 4,750 rpm | 350 lb⋅ft (475 N⋅m) at 2,750 rpm | |
| 2,720 cc (166 cu in) 2.7 Ecoboost V6 | 2019–2024 | 335 bhp (250 kW) at 5,550 rpm | 380 lb⋅ft (515 N⋅m) at 3,250 rpm | |
| 2.0 L (120 cu in) TDCI I4 (Europe) | 2016–2018 | 180 bhp (134 kW) at 3,500 rpm | 295 lb⋅ft (400 N⋅m) at 2,000-2,750 rpm | Available only with a 6-speed manual transmission |
| 2.0 L (120 cu in) TDCI I4 (Europe) | 2016–2018 | 210 bhp (157 kW) at 3,000-4,500 rpm | 332 lb⋅ft (450 N⋅m) at 2,000 rpm | Available only with a 6-speed PowerShift dual-clutch transmission |
| 2.0 L (120 cu in) EcoBlue I4 (Europe) | 2018–2024 | 190 bhp (142 kW) at 3,500 rpm | 295 lb⋅ft (400 N⋅m) at 2,000 rpm | Available only with a 6-speed manual transmission |
| 2.0 L (120 cu in) EcoBlue I4 (Australia) | 2018–2024 | 190 bhp (142 kW) at 3,500 rpm | 295 lb⋅ft (400 N⋅m) at 2,000 rpm | Available only with an 8-speed automatic transmission |
| 2.0 L (120 cu in) EcoBlue I4 (Europe) | 2018–2024 | 238 bhp (177 kW) at 3,750 rpm | 369 lb⋅ft (500 N⋅m) at 2,000 rpm | Available only with an 8-speed automatic transmission |

=== Safety ===
ANCAP test results* Ford Endura ST-Line (New Zealand only) (2016, aligned with Euro NCAP)
| Test | Points | % |
|---|---|---|
| Overall: | 5 /5 stars | |
| Adult occupant: | 32.4 | 85% |
| Child occupant: | 37.6 | 76% |
| Pedestrian: | 28.2 | 67% |
| Safety assist: | 10.7 | 89% |

ANCAP test results* Ford Endura all variants (2016, aligned with Euro NCAP)
| Test | Points | % |
|---|---|---|
| Overall: | 5 /5 stars | |
| Adult occupant: | 32.4 | 85% |
| Child occupant: | 37.6 | 76% |
| Pedestrian: | 28.2 | 67% |
| Safety assist: | 10.7 | 89% |

2016 Ford Edge on NHTSA
| Overall: | 5/5 stars |
| Frontal driver: | 5/5 stars |
| Frontal passenger: | 5/5 stars |
| Side driver: | 5/5 stars |
| Side passenger: | 5/5 stars |
| Side pole driver: | 5/5 stars |
| Rollover AWD: | 15.4% |

2015 Ford Edge on IIHS:
| Category | Rating |
|---|---|
| Moderate overlap frontal offset | Good |
| Small overlap frontal offset (2015–present) | Acceptable^{1} |
| Side impact | Good |
| Roof strength | Good^{2} |

^{1} vehicle structure rated "Good"
^{2} strength-to-weight ratio: 5.11

== Third generation (CDX706; 2023) ==
Third generation
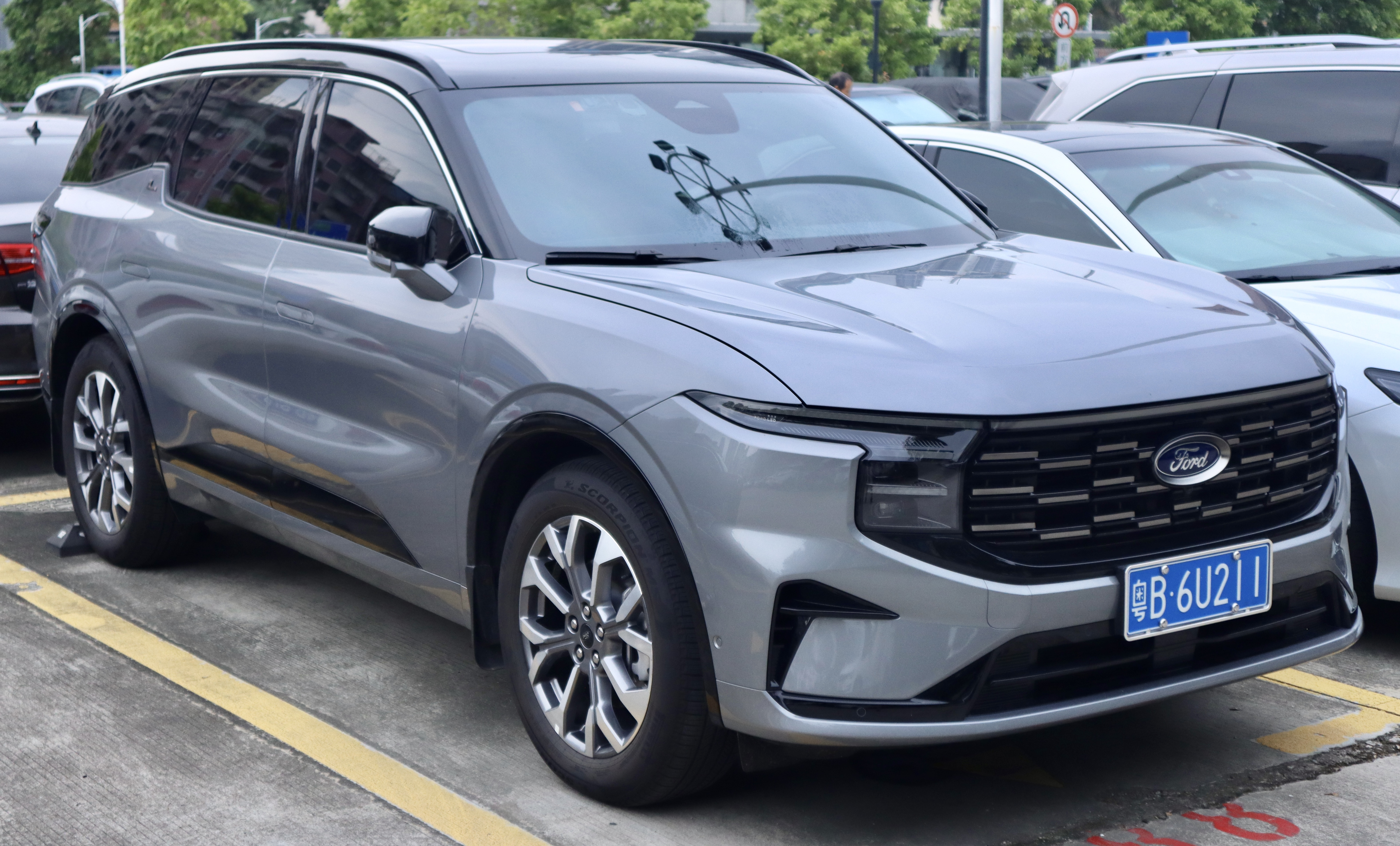
- 2023 Ford Edge L (China)

Overview
- Model code: CDX706
- Production: 2023–present
- Assembly: China: Hangzhou, Zhejiang (Changan Ford)
- Designer: Siddartha Kazami

Body and chassis
- Layout: Front-engine, front-wheel drive; Front-engine, all-wheel drive
- Platform: Ford C2
- Related: Lincoln Nautilus (second generation); Ford Mondeo (fifth generation); Ford Mondeo Sport

Powertrain
- Engine: Gasoline: 2.0 L CAF484WQC4 EcoBoost turbo I4; Gasoline Hybrid: 2.0 L CAF484WQH0 EcoBoost turbo I4
- Transmission: 8-speed automatic; Planetary eCVT (hybrid)
- Battery: Li-NMC BYD (hybrid)
- Range: 1,188 km (738 mi) (hybrid, WLTC)

Dimensions
- Wheelbase: 2,950 mm (116.1 in)
- Length: 5,000 mm (196.9 in); 5,011 mm (197.3 in) (2027+)
- Width: 1,961 mm (77.2 in)
- Height: 1,773 mm (69.8 in)
- Curb weight: 1,990–2,152 kg (4,387–4,744 lb)

The third-generation Edge was revealed on February 23, 2023 for the Chinese market as the Ford Edge L (Chinese: 锐界; pinyin: ruì jiè) as a replacement for the China exclusive Ford Edge Plus, and is built by Changan Ford, a joint venture between Ford and Changan Automobile. It is a mid-size SUV with three rows of seats, available with gasoline and hybrid powertrains.

The body grows in length and is 22.1 centimeters (8.7 in) longer than the previous generation Edge, and 12.2 centimeters (4.8 in) longer than the Edge Plus. The updated exterior styling elements including LED headlights, optional two-tone black roof, C-pillar 'fin' design, and a triple horizontal light stripe motif in both the DRLs and taillights.

The interior is notable for its expansive screens. A 12.3-inch (312 mm) screen placed behind a slightly squared off steering wheel serves as the digital gauge cluster. A 13.2-inch (335 mm) touchscreen is used as the standard infotainment system, which is powered by a Qualcomm Snapdragon 8155 chip. An optional 27-inch (690 mm) 4K touchscreen sits atop the center and passenger side of the dashboard, where the left half serves as the vehicle's infotainment system, while the right half is the passenger entertainment screen. Underneath the screens, a narrow air vent with copper accents spans the dashboard. The center console contains a large cubby with a sliding cover at the front, with the gear selector next to an optional wireless charging pad sitting behind it.

Seating is either in a 2-3-2 or 2-2-3 arrangement; the 2-3-2 arrangement is standard, with flat folding second row seats and 309 litres (10.9 cu ft) of rear cargo space, expanding to 2,876 litres (101.6 cu ft) with the both rows of rear seats folded down. The optional 2-2-3 arrangement features captain's chairs in the second row, which have optional power adjustment, heating and ventilating, and can recline to become nearly flat with an extending leg rest; it has 969 litres (34.2 cu ft) of rear cargo area with the third row folded down. Seating surfaces are either a combination of fabric and leather, or full leather and features two-toned colors on all trims.

Other features include standard three-zone independent climate control, optional Level 2 semi-autonomous driving features, interior ambient lighting, active noise cancellation, 4G network connectivity and OTA updates, optional head-up display, optional 1.26 m^{2} (13.6 sq ft) panoramic sunroof, and optional 12-speaker Bang & Olufsen audio system.

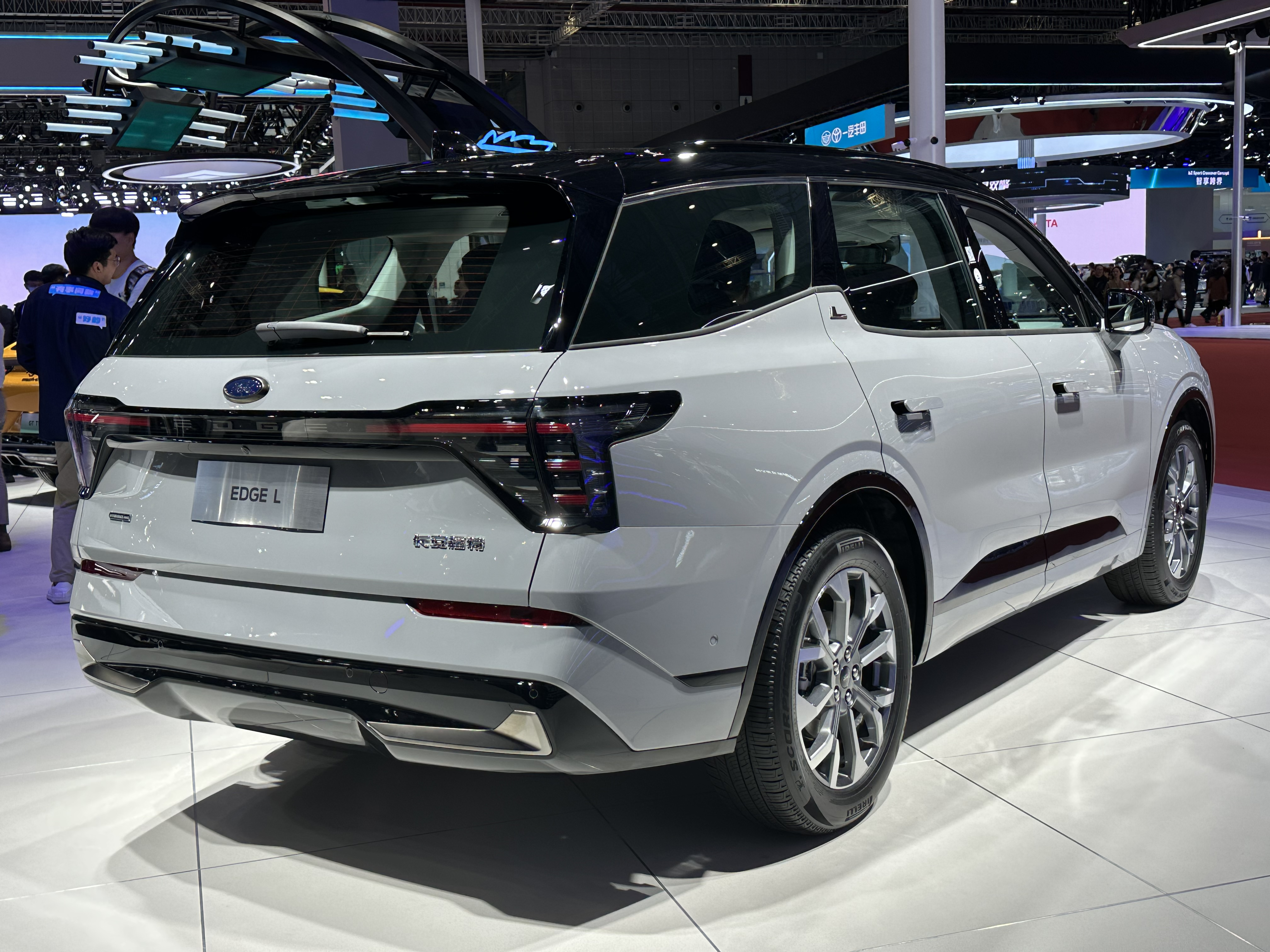
Rear View

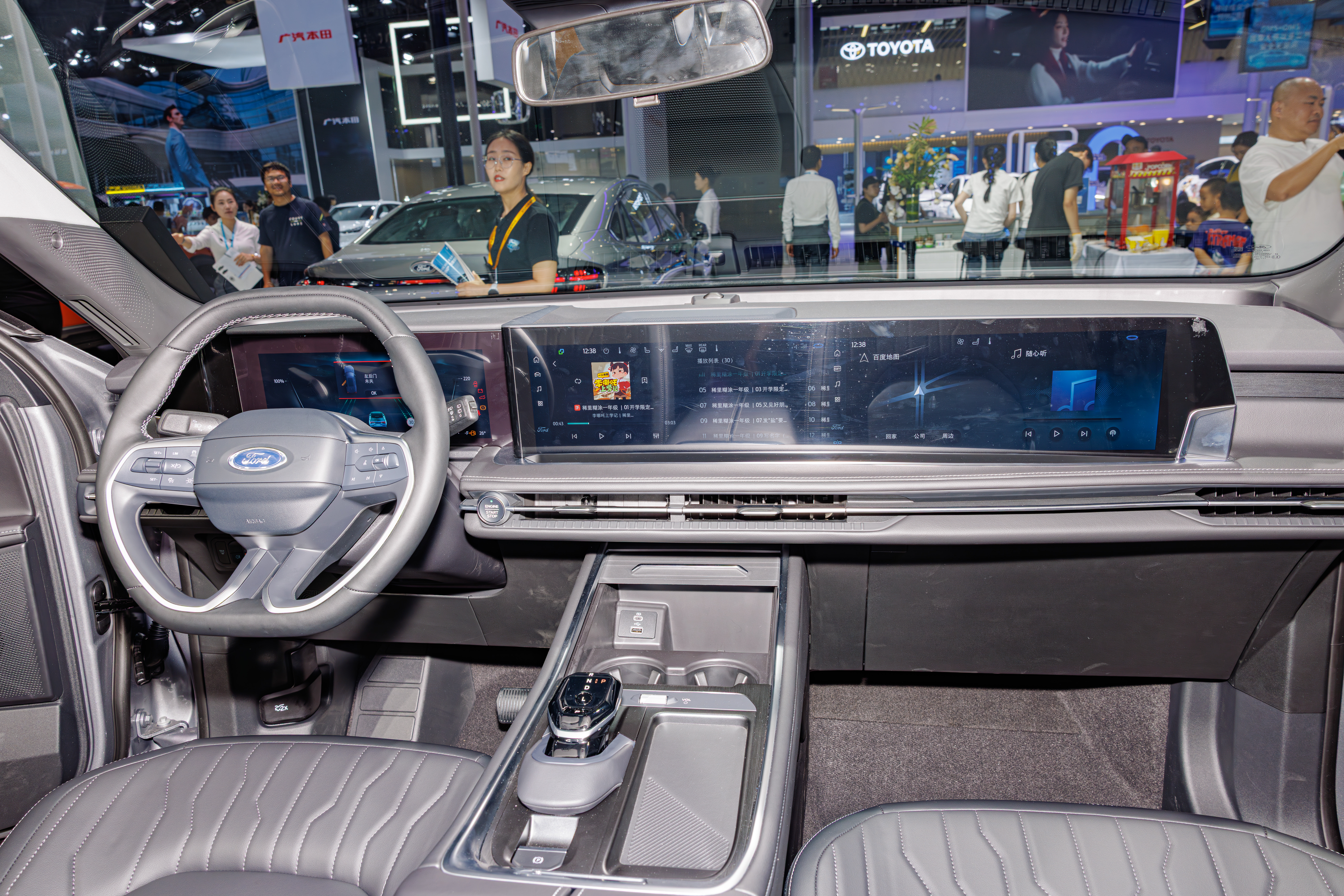
Interior

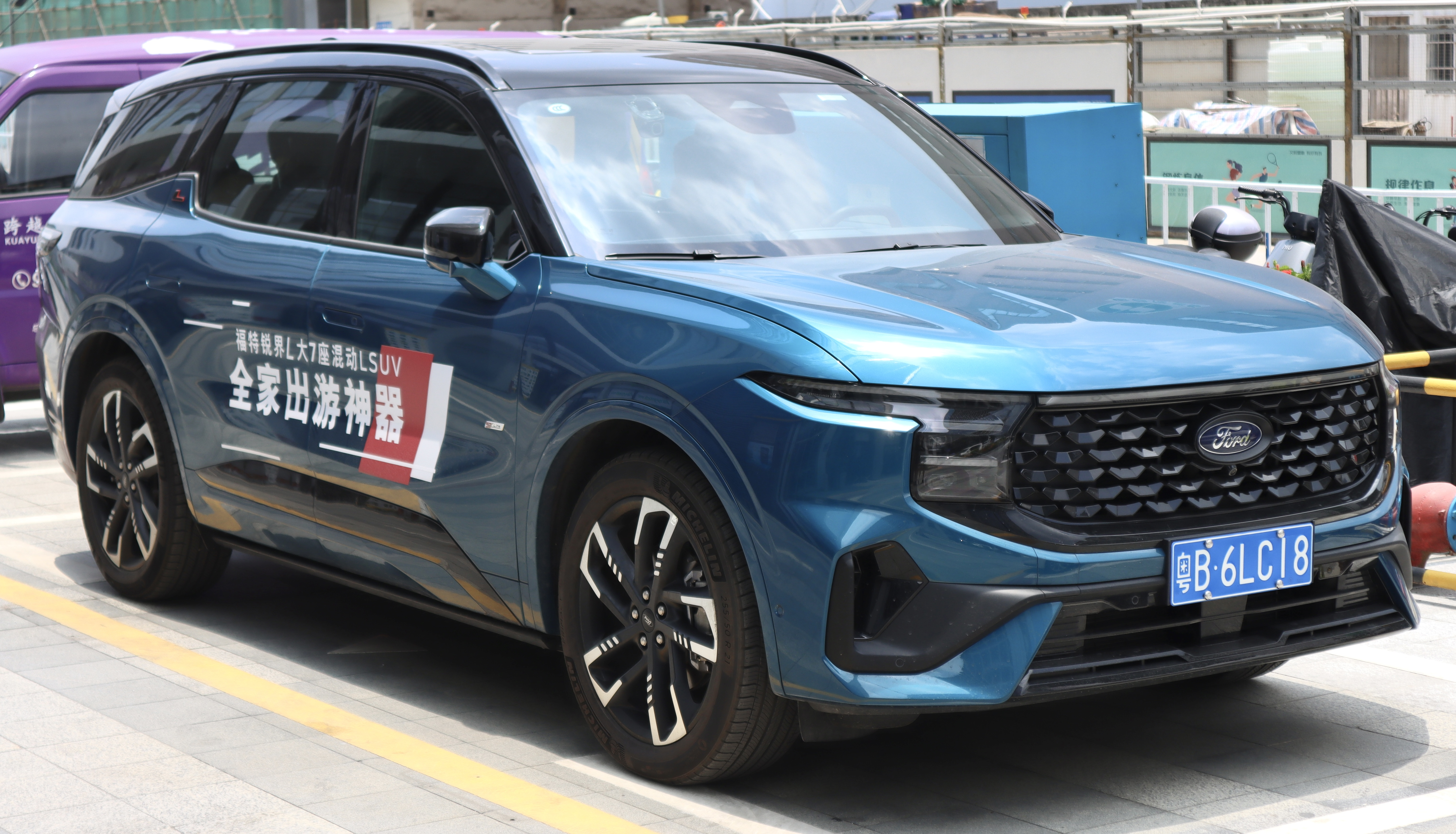
2023 Edge L ST-Line (front)

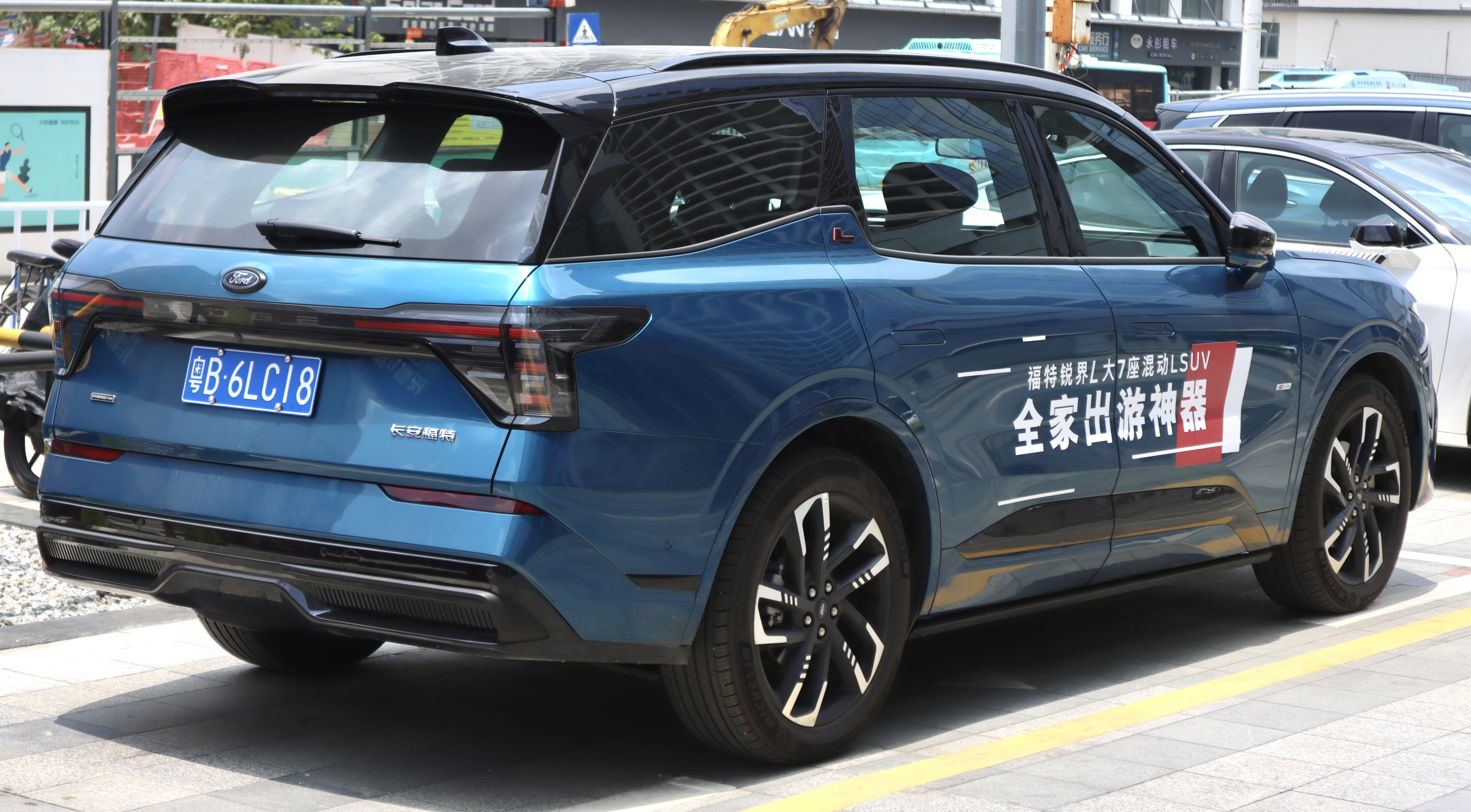
2023 Edge L ST-Line (rear)

=== Non-Chinese markets ===
The third-gen Ford Edge was launched in Panama in November 2025 exclusively with the hybrid setup introduced in the Chinese market. Panama is the first country to receive the Edge in the Latin America-Caribbean region.

In December 2025, the third-generation Edge launched in Mexico, with vehicles starting to reach dealerships across the country in the same month. Only the hybrid model is available in the country.

=== Facelift (2026) ===
On May 11, 2026, MIIT filings revealed the first details of the updated Edge L, which is marketed as the 2027 model year. It is expected to launch in the second half of 2026. It launched on 29 October 2026.

The exterior features minor changes including new side air vents on the front bumper, a revised taillight design, new door puddle lamps, and license plate holder moved from the tailgate to the rear bumper, causing the vehicle's overall length to increase by 11 mm (0.43 in). The powertrain remains unchanged.

The interior features minor changes, including a revised center console arrangement with dual wireless chargers, restyled air vents, and restyled door cards which feature more extensive soft-touch material.

2027 Edge L (front)

2027 Edge L (rear)

Interior

=== Powertrain ===
The Edge L is offered with two powertrain options, a gasoline engine with an optional hybrid version. The standard engine is a 2.0 L turbocharged 4-cylinder with a 10.8:1 compression ratio making 245 hp (183 kW; 248 PS) and 279 lb⋅ft (378 N⋅m; 38.6 kg⋅m) of torque which is mounted to an eight-speed automatic transmission. The hybrid version combines a similar engine with a 9.5:1 compression ratio with a 188 hp (140 kW; 191 PS), 236 lb⋅ft (320 N⋅m; 32.6 kg⋅m) electric motor through a planetary gearset eCVT to achieve a total system output of 268 hp (200 kW; 272 PS) and 299 lb⋅ft (405 N⋅m; 41.3 kg⋅m) of torque. Both powertrains are offered with optional mechanical all-wheel drive capable of shifting 100% of torque to either axle and have transverse mounted engines.

Fuel consumption ranges from 6.31 L/100 km (37.3 mpg_{‑US}) with the front-wheel drive hybrid model to 8.91 L/100 km (26.4 mpg_{‑US}) with the all-wheel drive gasoline model on the WLTP cycle.

| Engine | Power | Torque | Transmission | Top speed |
|---|---|---|---|---|
| 1,999 cc (122.0 cu in) Ecoboost I4 (CAF484WQC4) | 245 hp (183 kW; 248 PS) @5500 rpm | 279 lb⋅ft (378 N⋅m; 38.6 kg⋅m) @2000–4500 rpm | 8-speed automatic | 193 km/h (120 mph) |
| 1,999 cc (122.0 cu in) Ecoboost I4 E Hybrid (CAF484WQH0) | 268 hp (200 kW; 272 PS) @5500 rpm | 299 lb⋅ft (405 N⋅m; 41.3 kg⋅m) @3000–4000 rpm | Planetary eCVT | 193 km/h (120 mph) |

== Sales ==
| Calendar year | U.S. | Canada | Mexico | China | Europe | Brazil |
|---|---|---|---|---|---|---|
| 2006 | 2,202 | 161 | 38 | — | — | — |
| 2007 | 130,125 | 10,349 | 2,710 | — | — | — |
| 2008 | 110,798 | 11,834 | 3,103 | — | — | 75 |
| 2009 | 88,548 | 12,060 | 2,405 | — | — | 1,201 |
| 2010 | 118,637 | 17,040 | 2,817 | — | — | 920 |
| 2011 | 121,702 | 15,633 | 3,379 | — | — | 1,989 |
| 2012 | 127,969 | 18,837 | 3,586 | — | — | 3,828 |
| 2013 | 129,109 | 17,274 | 2,155 | — | — | 3,243 |
| 2014 | 108,864 | 17,940 | 1,148 | — | — | 2,358 |
| 2015 | 124,120 | 16,580 | 1,631 | 65,152 | — | 1,031 |
| 2016 | 134,588 | 20,517 | 1,844 | 123,690 | 9,300 | 255 |
| 2017 | 142,603 | 19,967 | 1,327 | 108,525 | 16,000 | 309 |
| 2018 | 134,122 | 19,156 | 898 | 59,892 | 9,500 | 233 |
| 2019 | 138,515 | 19,856 | 850 | 32,815 | 8,644 | 134 |
| 2020 | 108,886 | 13,214 | 325 | 25,709 | 3,722 | 90 |
| 2021 | 85,225 | 11,830 | 261 | 31,091 | 348 | 41 |
| 2022 | 85,465 | 13,213 | 449 | 26,266 | 4 | 2 |
| 2023 | 106,098 | 14,008 | 295 | 25,502 | — | — |
| 2024 | 66,436 | 9,553 | 199 | 29,878 | — | — |
| 2025 | 3,040 | 615 | 365 | 32,592 | — | — |
