= Ford Airstream =

Ford Airstream Concept
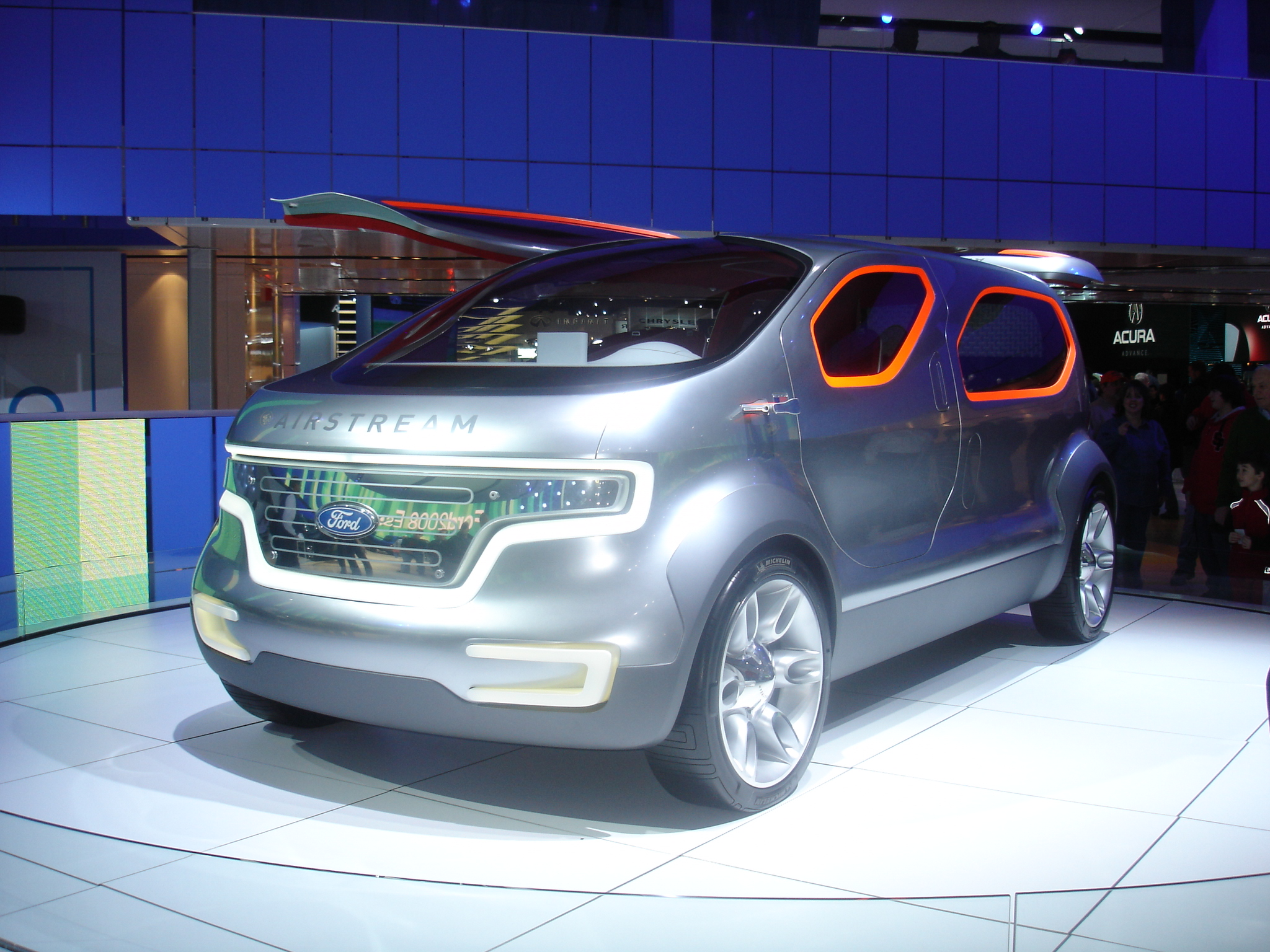

Overview
- Manufacturer: Ford

Body and chassis
- Class: Concept car
- Body style: 2-door wagon

Powertrain
- Engine: HySeries Fuel Cell Electric

Dimensions
- Wheelbase: 125.9 in (3,198 mm)
- Length: 185.0 in (4,699 mm)
- Width: 78.9 in (2,004 mm)
- Height: 70.6 in (1,793 mm)

The Ford Airstream was a concept car built by Ford that made its debut at the 2007 North American International Auto Show in Detroit, Michigan. The Ford Airstream was a retro-futuristic crossover utility vehicle that was inspired by the classic Airstream recreational vehicle trailers built since the 1930s. The modern Ford Airstream concept included a plug-in hybrid hydrogen fuel cell drive system, called HySeries Drive, that operated exclusively on electrical power. Ford called the Ford Airstream Concept "a futuristic look at crossovers" as "modern touring vehicle(s)" for recreational travelers. The concept vehicle was designed in cooperation with Airstream, a division of Thor Industries. The design and name of the Airstream were possibly influenced by the Ford Aerostar.

== Powerplant ==
The concept vehicle was powered by a rechargeable plug-in hybrid hydrogen fuel cell drive train, called HySeries Drive. This power plant system was developed with partial funding from the United States Department of Energy, and is currently being tested on a prototype version of the Ford Edge. The Airstream Concept's wheels were driven by electric motors, which were powered by a lithium-ion battery pack. The Ballard Power Systems hydrogen fuel cell system recharged the vehicle's battery pack as needed, as a portable generator, and the vehicle could also be plugged into an AC source, to recharge between trips. The HySeries Drive delivered the equivalent of a combined city/highway equivalent fuel economy of 41 mpg (U.S.) (5.7 L/100 km). In pure-battery mode, the Ford Airstream Concept was designed to travel about 25 miles (40 km), before the hydrogen-powered fuel cell began operating to recharge the vehicle's 336-volt lithium-ion battery pack. With a full load of hydrogen, the range increased another 280 miles (451 km), for a total of 305 miles (491 km). The sole exhaust emission from the operating vehicle was water vapor.

== Exterior ==
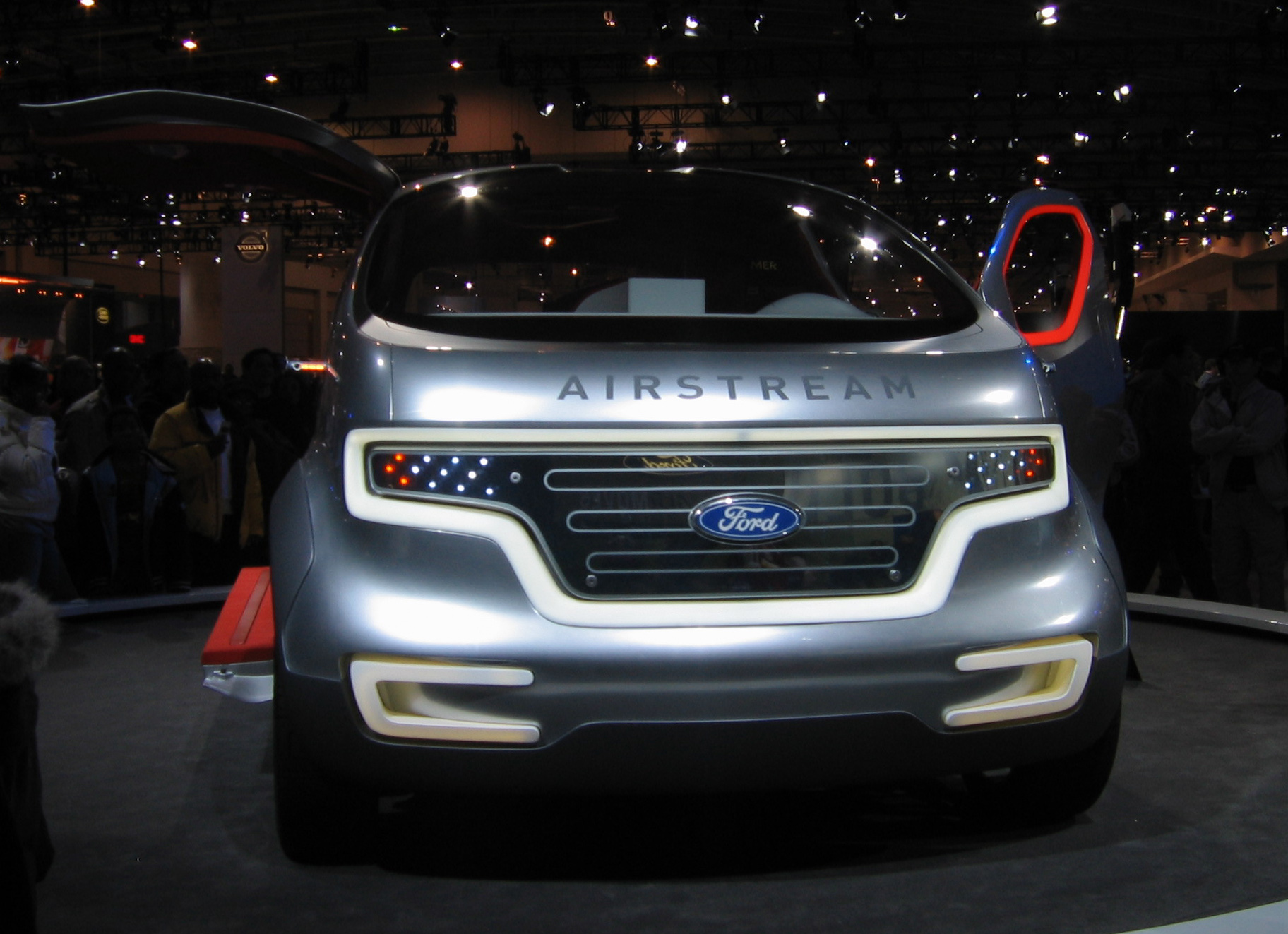
Ford Airstream

The Ford Airstream included asymmetric doors. The passenger side door was a power clamshell hatch that ran two-thirds the length of the vehicle for loading of passengers and cargo. The crossover included a rear hatch for loading cargo aft.

== Interior ==
The interior was inspired by spacecraft images and environments portrayed in 2001: A Space Odyssey, according to Ford. It was described as a "lounge atmosphere", meant to provide a relaxing experience while traveling. The instrument panel included flush-mounted, touch-sensitive controls and a single, multi-function gauge display with primary driving information. A center-mounted dual-view screen provided a camera view and secondary driver-oriented information, and also allowed the front-seat passenger to view DVD movies and work on the Internet.

The front seats were captain's chairs that could swivel and rotate to face aft. The rear seats were lounge-like, and included a 360-degree viewscreen for entertainment, games, Internet access, and as a live camera feed. The seats included four-point safety belts.

== Specifications ==
- Powertrain: Ford/Ballard HySeries Drive plug-in hydrogen hybrid fuel cell
- Chassis dimensions
  - Overall length: 185.0 in (4,699 mm)
  - Wheelbase: 125.9 in (3,198 mm)
  - Overall width: 78.9 in (2,004 mm)
  - Overall height at curb: 70.6 in (1,793 mm)
  - Front track width: 67.6 in (1,717 mm)
  - Rear track width: 69.2 in (1,758 mm)
- Suspension
  - Front: Double wishbone independent suspension
  - Rear: Multi-link independent
- Interior
  - Front headroom: 37.5 in (952 mm)
  - Rear headroom: 36.2 in (919 mm)
  - Front legroom: 39.6 in (1,006 mm)
  - Rear headroom: 33.1 in (841 mm)
