= Noble M600 =

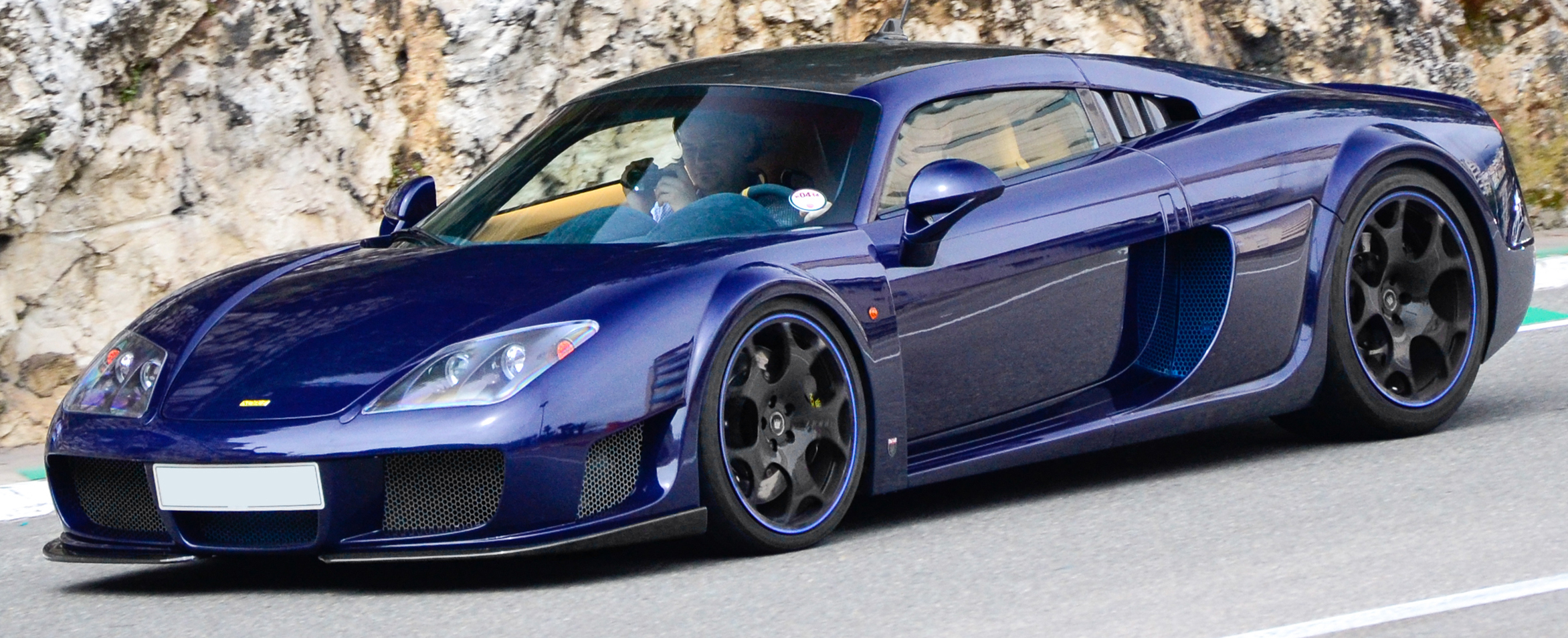

Overview
- Manufacturer: Noble Automotive
- Production: 2010–2018
- Assembly: United Kingdom: Leicestershire
- Designer: Lee Noble

Body and chassis
- Class: Sports car (S)
- Body style: 2-door coupé (Carbon Sport); 2-door targa top (Speedster)
- Layout: Longitudinal, Mid-engine, Rear-wheel drive
- Related: Noble M14; Noble M500

Powertrain
- Engine: 4.4 L (4,414 cc) Volvo/Yamaha B8444S twin-turbo V8
- Power output: 650 hp (485 kW; 659 PS), 604 lb⋅ft (819 N⋅m) (maximum)
- Transmission: 6-speed Oerlikon Graziano transaxle manual 6-speed Oerlikon Graziano transaxle Semi-automatic

Dimensions
- Wheelbase: 2,540 mm (100.0 in)
- Length: 4,360 mm (171.7 in)
- Width: 1,910 mm (75.2 in)
- Height: 1,120 mm (44.1 in)
- Kerb weight: 1,250 kg (2,760 lb)

Chronology
- Predecessor: Noble M400; Noble M15
- Successor: Noble M500

The Noble M600 is a handbuilt English sports car manufactured by low volume automobile manufacturer Noble Automotive in Leicestershire. Construction of the car is of stainless steel and carbon fibre. The car uses a twin-turbocharged Volvo/Yamaha V8 engine.

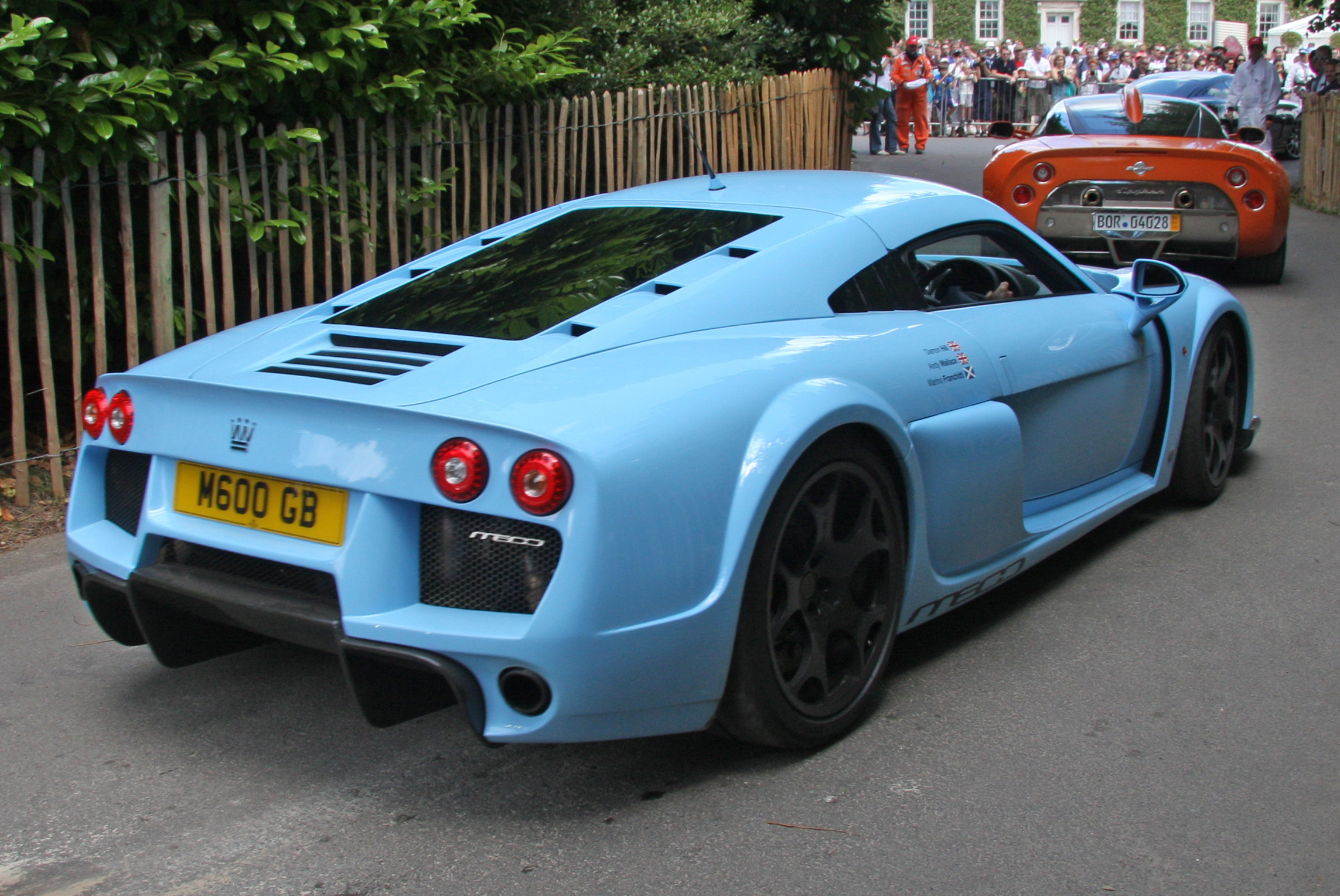
Rear view

== Model information ==
=== General ===
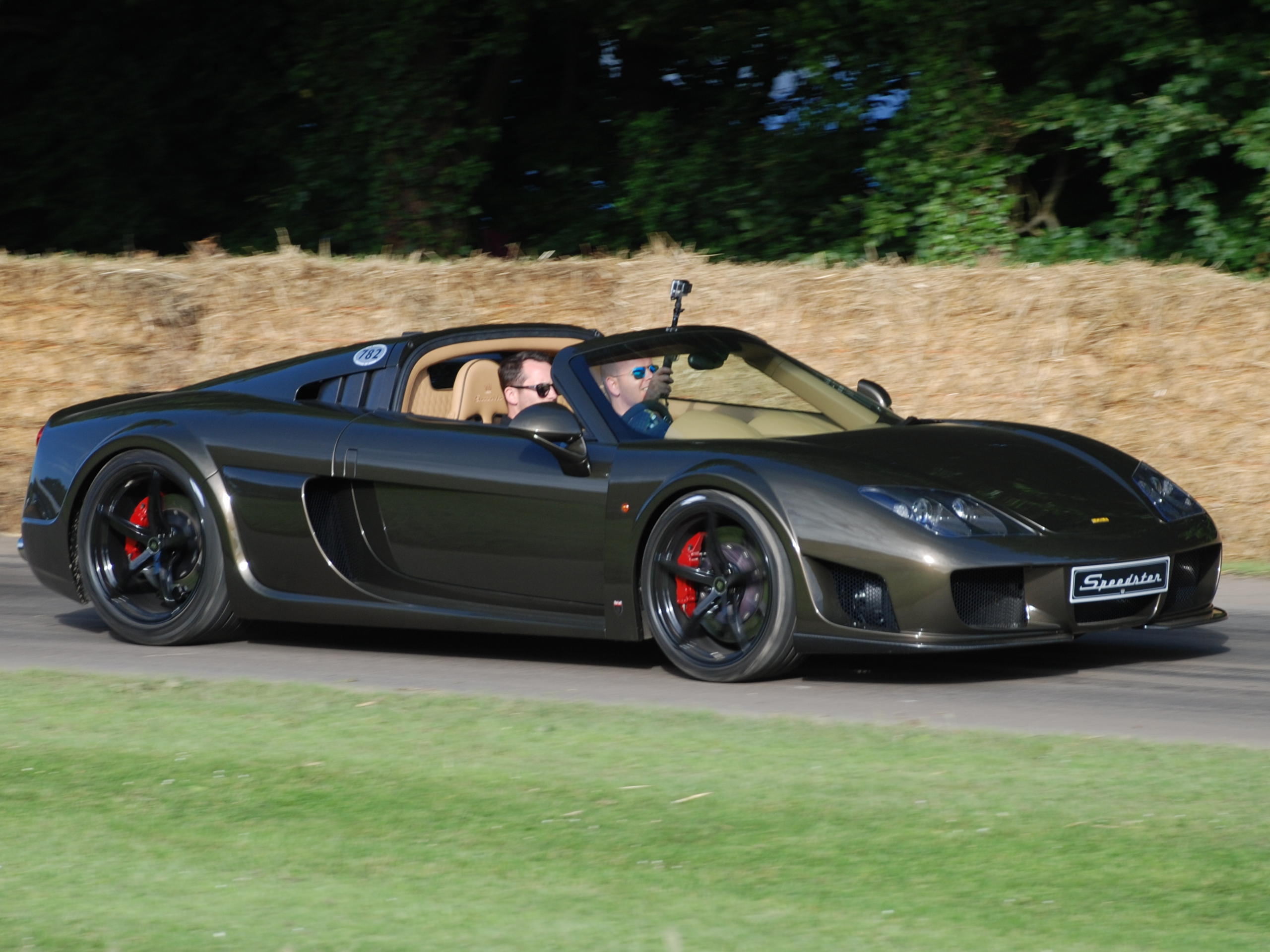
M600 Speedster

The M600 comes in three specifications, the standard; which uses a fibre glass body; the carbon sport which uses a carbon-fibre body and the Speedster which is basically a targa top version. The M600 is hand-built by a team of 20 workers at the company's Leicestershire facility. The M600 uses a steel backbone and aluminium chassis which is the same chassis used on the stillborn M15. The standard model uses carbon-fibre for vital body parts of the car and this allows it to have a curb weight of 1,250 kg (2,756 lb), although when independently tested, the standard model weighed 1,305 kg (2,877 lb).

=== Engine and transmission ===
The M600 uses a 4.4 L (4,414 cc) Yamaha-built Volvo B8444S 60º V8 engine which is also used in the Volvo XC90 and S80. The engine used in the M600 is manufactured by Motorkraft in the US from B8444S crate engines with Garrett AiResearch twin-turbochargers equipped with variable boost. This allows the buyer to choose from variable power outputs ranging from 450 hp (336 kW; 456 PS) (Road setting, 0.6 bar (8.7 psi) pressure), 550 hp (410 kW; 558 PS) (Track setting, 0.8 bar (12 psi)) and 650 hp (485 kW; 659 PS) (Race setting, 1 bar (15 psi)) through the use of a switch present on the dashboard. The engine also features a MoTeC M190 and Injector Dynamics ID725 electronic fuel injection. It has a compression ratio of 9.50:1. It uses an Oerlikon Graziano transaxle six-speed manual gearbox and has the redline set at 7,000 rpm. At least, a pre-production variant of the Speedster is also equipped with an automatic gearbox.

=== Brakes ===
The M600 uses steel brake discs with six piston calipers at the front and four piston calipers at the rear. The brakes are designed by Britain-based braking specialist Alcon. Owing to the driver focused nature of the car, there is no Anti-lock Braking System installed and the brakes have limited servo assistance.

=== Interior ===
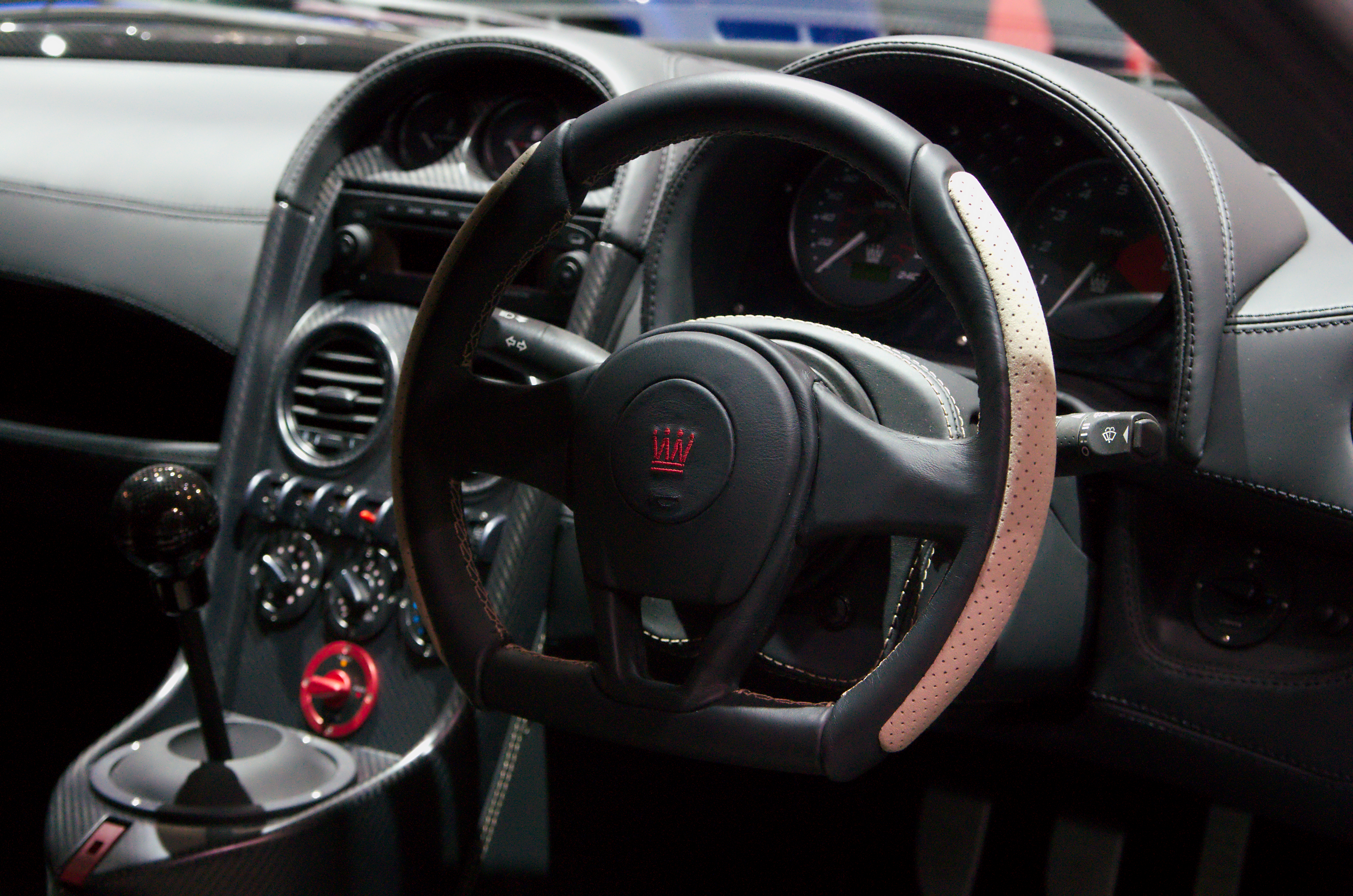
Interior with the Carbon Sport package

The interior of the car has twin hide upholstery and gloss carbon-fibre trim as standard. Buyers have the choice to choose from leather, suede, or alcantra upholstery along with trim choices of knurled wood or carbon fibre and wool carpeting. The switches and instrumentation are bespoke to the M600, although some components are shared with Jaguar and Aston Martin models. The car is equipped with an adjustable steering column and driver's seat while the pedals are offset to the left. The pedals are adjusted according to the owner's preference in order to provide a good driving position. A highlight of the interior is the engine power control knob, similar to Ferrari's Manettino dial, which allows the driver to choose from variable engine power outputs along with related turbo boost pressure (Road, Track and Race). The knob is present ahead of the gearshift knob on the dashboard. A traction control switch activates the limited traction control which is present to avoid oversteer. The interior is based on simplicity and is driver focused, inspired by the Ferrari F40 and due to this, it does away with climate control and modern infotainment systems.

=== Performance ===
- 0–97 km/h (60 mph): 3.0 seconds
- 0–193 km/h (120 mph): 8.9 seconds
- 0–322 km/h (200 mph): 29.8 seconds
- Standing 1/4 mile: 10.9 seconds
- Standing km: 19.9 seconds
- Power-to-weight ratio: 558 hp/tonne
- Top speed: 362 km/h (225 mph) - estimated / 346 km/h (215 mph) - proven
- Fuel capacity: 68 litres (18 US gal; 15 imp gal)

== Reception ==
The car was driven two times on the British motoring show Top Gear. First in Series 14, Episode 5 by Jeremy Clarkson, who held a positive reception to the car. The car later set a time of 1:17.7 on the Top Gear test track, being driven by the show's racing driver the Stig, beating the Pagani Zonda F Roadster and the Bugatti Veyron. It appeared for a second time in Series 18, Episode 1 co-host Richard Hammond drove a left-hand drive version of the car through Italy and the clutch failed, causing clutch material to damage the gearbox; Noble sent the production team another car. Despite the breakdown, Hammond heaped considerable praise on the car. It has also been featured in the American adaptation of the show where it receives considerable praise, the main "challenge" was to reach its top speed, the vehicle attained a top speed of 215 mph (346 km/h), but stopped because the vehicle ran out of space on the runway it was being tested on.
