= Volvo B8444S engine =

Volvo B8444S
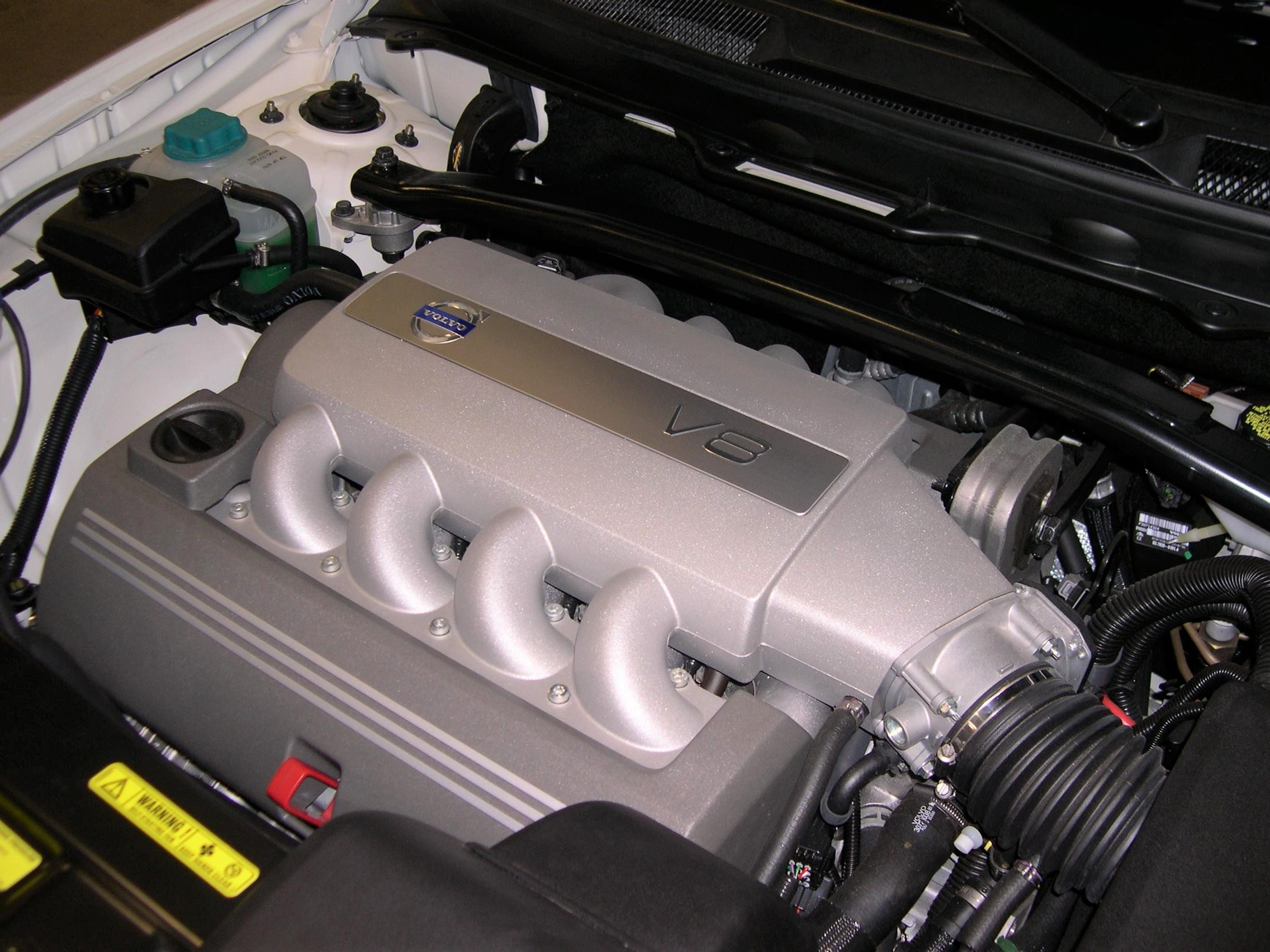
- B8444S installed in a 2006 Volvo XC90

Overview
- Manufacturer: Volvo Cars (design); Yamaha (manufacturing)
- Production: 2005–2010

Layout
- Configuration: 60° V8
- Displacement: 4.4 L (4,414 cc; 269.4 cu in); 5.0 L (4,989 cc; 304.4 cu in) (V8 Supercar); 5.3 L (5,330 cc; 325.3 cu in) (marine); 5.6 L (5,559 cc; 339.2 cu in) (marine)
- Cylinder bore: 94 mm (3.70 in); 95.5 mm (3.76 in) (V8 Supercar); 96 mm (3.78 in) (marine)
- Piston stroke: 79.5 mm (3.13 in); 87.1 mm (3.43 in) (V8 Supercar); 96 mm (3.78 in) (marine)
- Cylinder block material: Aluminium
- Cylinder head material: Aluminium
- Valvetrain: DOHC 4 valves / cyl.
- Compression ratio: 9.6:1, 10.4:1, 12.0:1

Combustion
- Turbocharger: Twin-turbo (on Noble M600)
- Fuel system: Port fuel injection
- Fuel type: Petrol
- Cooling system: Water-cooled

Output
- Power output: 232 kW (315 PS; 311 hp); 478 kW (650 PS; 641 hp); 485 kW (659 PS; 650 hp) (V8 Supercar engine)
- Torque output: 440 N⋅m (325 lb⋅ft); 819 N⋅m (604 lbf⋅ft); 660 N⋅m (487 lbf⋅ft) (V8 Supercar engine)

Dimensions
- Length: 754 mm (29.7 in)
- Width: 635 mm (25.0 in)
- Dry weight: 190 kg (420 lb)

Chronology
- Predecessor: Volvo V8

The B8444S is an automobile V8 engine manufactured in Japan by Yamaha Motor Company for Volvo Cars.

== Usage ==
Volvo began offering a V8 engine in its large P2 platform automobiles in 2005. It was initially offered only for the Volvo XC90 but later found its way in the second generation Volvo S80, and was mated to a six speed Aisin Seiki AWTF80-SC transmission of Japan also with a Swedish Haldex all-wheel drive (AWD) system. The 4.4 L V8 Volvo engine was built by Yamaha in Japan.

The B8444S shares its Yamaha origination, transverse layout, and 60 degree bank angle with the Ford SHO V8 engine. The two engines share many common dimensions including bore centers, stroke, bearing journal diameters, and deck height, but the die-cast open-deck aluminum Volvo block is clearly different from the sand-cast closed-deck aluminum SHO engine block.

As revealed in BBC's Top Gear show (Series 14 Episode 5) this basic engine is also used in the Noble M600, albeit longitudinally mounted, developing some 650 PS (478 kW; 641 hp) with the addition of Garrett AiResearch twin-turbochargers. The engine also features a MoTeC M190 and Injector Dynamics ID725 electronic fuel injection. The Noble unit is custom built by a third-party firm expressly for Noble Cars UK.

Volvo discontinued the engine subsequent to a change in its ownership and management in August, 2010. The new management intends to offer a single engine across all Volvo models, ultimately a four cylinder. At that point Volvo Cars was owned by Ford.

Applications:

- 2005 Volvo XC90
- 2006 Volvo S80
- 2010 Noble M600 (twin-turbocharged)
- 2014 Volvo S60 (V8 Supercars racecar)

== Specification ==
As a Volvo V8, this new engine uses the similar Volvo engine naming system. The engine is called the Volvo B8444S. B being for bensin (gasoline), 8 for the number of cylinders, 4.4 for the total displacement of the engine, the last 4 for the number of valves per cylinder and S for suction, meaning it is naturally aspirated.

The engine is a 4.4 L (4,414 cc) aluminium DOHC V8 which produces 315 PS (232 kW; 311 hp) and 440 N⋅m (325 lb⋅ft). It has a 60 degree Vee angle. The engine block and heads are cast from aluminium reducing its weight to a comparatively light 190 kg (420 lb).

To retain its 90 degree firing interval with its 60 degree Vee angle and cross plane crankshaft, the B8444s utilised offset crank journals.

Originally debuted in the Volvo XC90, which previously used 5- or 6-cylinder transverse inline engines, the B8444S had a number of significant packaging challenges to overcome. To save space and enable transverse orientation, the alternator is mounted directly to the engine block without brackets, the exhaust camshafts are linked to the intake camshafts with smaller secondary chains, and the left-hand cylinder bank is offset from its counterpart by half a cylinder's width. These tactics resulted in what was, at the time, the most compact V8 for its given 4.4 L displacement.

The B8444S also made strides in emissions standards as the first V8 engine to meet the Ultra-low-emission vehicle (ULEV II) standard. The emissions standards were met using a combination of four catalytic converters and continuous variable valve timing.

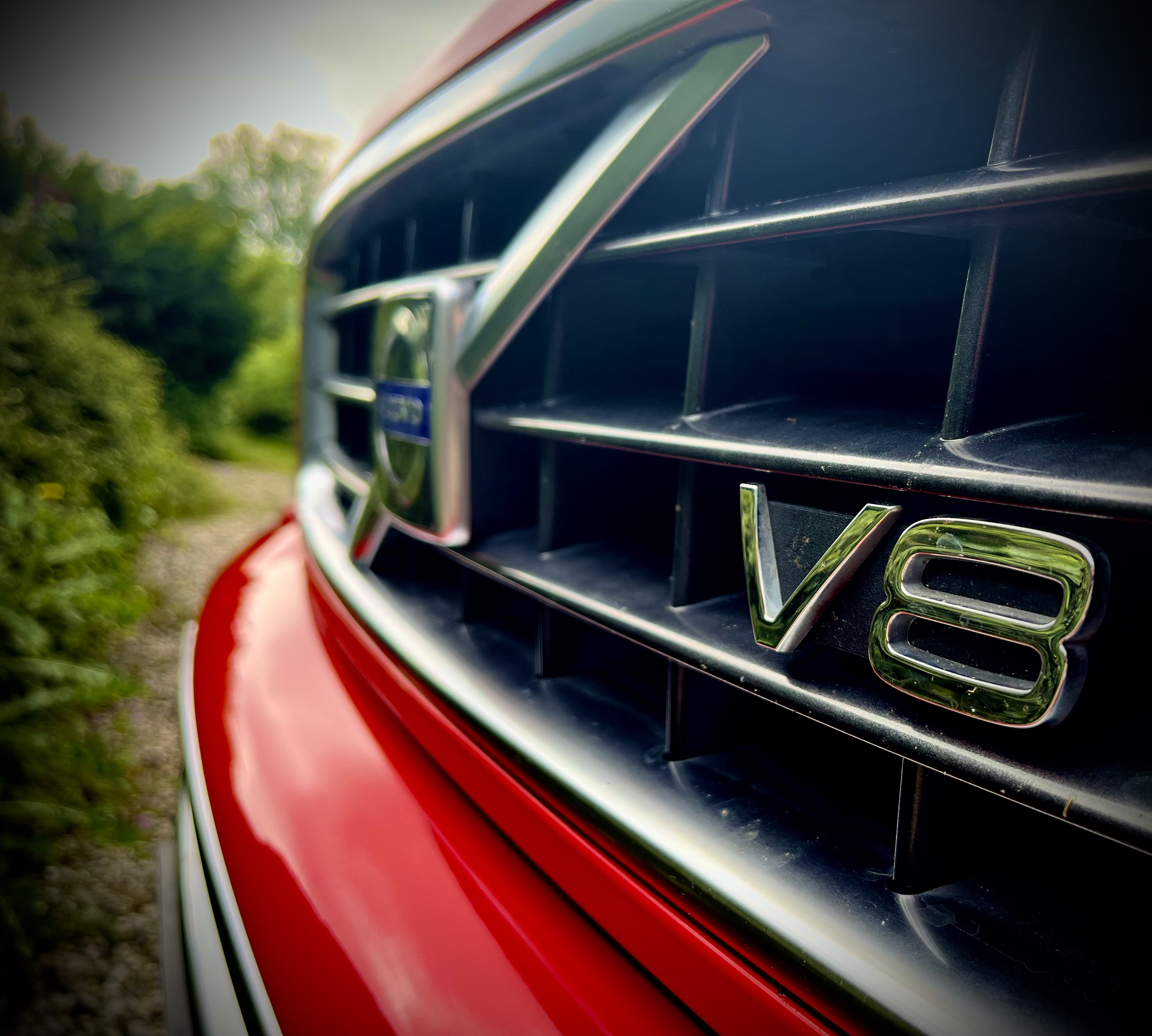
Volvo V8 badge

== Motorsport ==
A 5.0 L version was developed for use in Volvo S60s by Garry Rogers Motorsport in the V8 Supercars series between 2014 and 2016.

== Marine ==
The engine block is also used for the Yamaha F300V8, F350V8, and XTO Offshore outboards. The displacement ranges from 5.3 to 5.6 litres.

This displacement increase was achieved by increasing the stroke to 96 mm (3.78 in). The heads are also modified to “reverse flow” types where the inlet ports are on the outside of the engine, and the exhaust ports exit in towards the Vee of the engine. This allows a single exhaust exit path from the center of the engine which aids packaging the unit into an outboard form factor. The compression ratio was also dropped to 9.6:1. Whilst not ideal from an efficiency standpoint, it does reduce heat and stress on the engine which increases durability; an essential attribute for marine duty. It also allows 87 octane (AKI) rated fuels to be used.

The latest development of this outboard is called the ”XTO Offshore” and is rated at 425 hp (317 kW; 431 PS). It has an increased displacement of 5.6-litres achieved by increasing the bore diameter from 94 to 96 mm (3.70 to 3.78 in). The stroke remains the same, however the compression ratio is now 12.0:1. It also utilizes a gasoline direct injection system, a first for a 4-stroke outboard engine, and it requires 89 Octane (AKI) rated fuel.
