= Noble M15 =

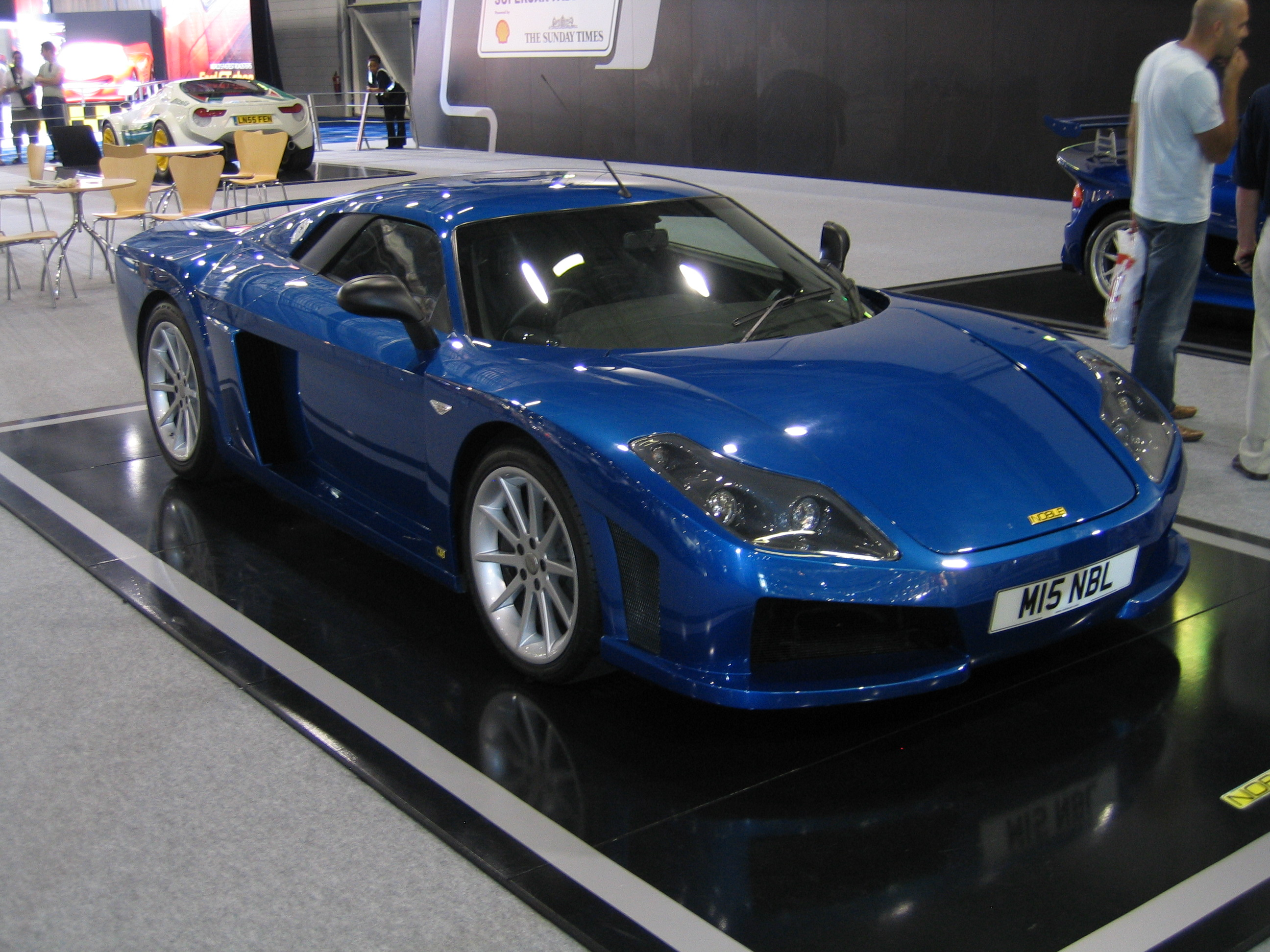

Overview
- Manufacturer: Noble
- Production: 2006–2011
- Assembly: United Kingdom: Leicestershire
- Designer: Lee Noble

Body and chassis
- Class: Sports car (S)
- Body style: 2-door coupé
- Layout: Longitudinally-mounted, Rear mid-engine, rear-wheel drive

Powertrain
- Engine: 2967 cc Ford Duratec Twin-turbo V6
- Power output: 455 bhp (461 PS; 339 kW) and 455 lb⋅ft (617 N⋅m) of torque
- Transmission: 6-speed manual

Dimensions
- Wheelbase: 2,438 mm (96 in); Track front 1,594 mm (63 in); Track rear 1,503 mm (59 in)
- Length: 4,270 mm (168 in)
- Width: 1,850 mm (73 in)
- Height: 1,116 mm (44 in)
- Curb weight: 1,250 kg (2,756 lb)

Chronology
- Predecessor: Noble M14
- Successor: Noble M600; Noble M500 (V6 Twin-turbo engine)

The Noble M15 is a sports car designed and developed by Noble Automotive, a high-performance sports car manufacturer based in Leicestershire, England.

Production of the M15 was due to begin in early 2006. The Noble M15 is intended to appeal to a far broader market than the M12-GTO3R or the M400 and compete directly with the Porsche 911 Turbo/GT-3 and Ferrari F430. As a result, the Noble M15 has a number of features not previously found on Nobles such as satellite navigation, traction control, electric windows and ABS.

Noble founder Lee Noble has been quoted in indicating "the M12 is a great car, but it's very focused and [he] wanted to produce a supercar people could use every day... It was time for Noble to take a big step up in terms of refinement, practicality and style." Despite increased comfort and usability compared to previous Noble cars, Lee Noble has also stated that the M15 is significantly quicker than the M400 around a race track.

== Design ==
The car is based on a brand new platform with a longitudinally-mounted engine connected to a bespoke gearbox created by Graziano. The double wishbone suspension is a development of the system mounted on the M400. Mounting the engine longitudinally (rather than transversely as on the M400) allowed the engine designers to increase the cooling flow to the engine, which allows the 3.0 L; 181.1 cu in (2,967 cc) twin-turbo Ford Duratec V6 engine to develop 455 bhp (339 kW; 461 PS). The engine has been designed to meet European emission standards and the new steel/aluminium space frame has been designed with a view to passing crash test regulations around the world. The M15 is planned to be the first Noble which gains European and US type approval.

Like all the Noble M models, the M15 has a steel spaceframe and roll cage covered with graphite-reinforced plastic body panelling, ventilated disc brakes front and rear, but unlike the previous models is designed to be more of a grand tourer/everyday sports car (an example of which would be the now-defunct Honda NSX) rather than an all-out track day car.

The Noble M15 accelerates from 0-62 mph (100 km/h) in 3.4 seconds and has a top speed of 185 mph (298 km/h). Its body shape is a coupé and it has 2 seats. In Britain it costs £74,950.

When it appeared on the popular British car TV show Top Gear, it was driven by Richard Hammond who praised its handling ("it just grips and grips, and then there's a tiny little bit of understeer to tell you you're being a bit of a spanner.") When it was handed over to Top Gear's 'tame racing driver', The Stig, it completed a lap of their circuit in 1:22.5, a time faster than a Ferrari F430 (1:22.9), and an Audi R8 (1:24.4). It was praised by Jeremy Clarkson, who called it "one of those Giant Killers."

The M15 was replaced by the Noble M600 in mid-2011, when all production on the M15 stopped.

== Drivetrain ==
This Noble M15 has a longitudinally-mounted rear mid-engine, rear-wheel-drive layout; chassis made of composite body steel space frame; double wishbone suspension, coil springs, gas pressurised dampers; steering rack-and-pinion, power assisted, speed sensitive; ventilated disc brakes all-round; weight 2,756 lb (1,250 kg); Length / Width / Height 4,270 mm (168.1 in) / 1,850 mm (72.8 in) / 1,116 mm (43.9 in); Wheelbase / Track (fr/r) 2,438 mm (96 in) / 1,594 mm (62.8 in) / 1,503 mm (59.2 in).

=== Engine ===
The Noble M15 has a twin-turbo 3.0 L; 181.1 cu in (2,967 cc) Ford Duratec V6 which produces 455 bhp (461 PS; 339 kW) at 6800 rpm and 455 lb⋅ft (617 N⋅m) at 4800 rpm of torque, can accelerate it from 0-60 mph (97 km/h) in 3.3 seconds and is capable of a top speed of 185 mph (298 km/h).

=== Transmission ===
The car has a 6-speed manual transmission as standard.
