= Noble M14 =

Overview
- Manufacturer: Noble
- Production: 2004 (Prototype)
- Assembly: United Kingdom: Leicestershire
- Designer: Lee Noble

Body and chassis
- Class: Sports car (S)
- Body style: 2-door Coupé
- Layout: Mid-engine, RWD
- Related: Noble M600

Powertrain
- Engine: 2,967 cc (181.1 cu in) Ford Duratec 30 V6
- Power output: 298 kW (400 hp) @ 6100 rpm 522 N⋅m (385 lbf⋅ft) @ 4750 rpm
- Transmission: 6-speed MMT6 manual

Dimensions
- Wheelbase: 2,438 mm (96.0 in)
- Length: 4,267 mm (168.0 in)
- Width: 1,935 mm (76.2 in) (incl. mirrors)
- Height: 1,150 mm (45.3 in)
- Kerb weight: 1,150 kg (2,535 lb)

Chronology
- Predecessor: Noble M12
- Successor: Noble M15

The Noble M14 was a prototype vehicle created by Noble Automotive that debuted at the 2004 British Motor Show.

It had 400 bhp (298 kW; 406 PS) at 6,100 rpm and 385 ft⋅lbf (522 N⋅m) of torque at 4,750 rpm from a highly modified version of Ford's 3.0 litre (2,968 cc) V6 using a six-speed manual transmission and twin turbochargers. It was planned to have a power-to-weight ratio of 363 bhp (271 kW) per ton, and to get to 60 mph (97 km/h) in 4.3 seconds with a maximum speed of 190 mph (306 km/h).

Noble expected it to compete with cars like the new (at the time) Porsche 911 Turbo and Ferrari F430. It was expected to cost £75,000.

Following the debut of the vehicle Lee Noble, the creator of the car, decided that it was insufficiently advanced over the current range of Noble cars to justify its price tag. Noble transferred development to a new car the Noble M15, a pre-production prototype of which was presented in 2007 (and shown on TV's Top Gear) but never launched. Noble is now believed to be working on two updated replacements - the M600 and the M15C (see Autocar magazine, 20 October 2007).

The M14 has appeared in a handful of video games including Test Drive Unlimited, Burnout Revenge and Project Gotham Racing 3.
