= Noble M500 =

British sports car

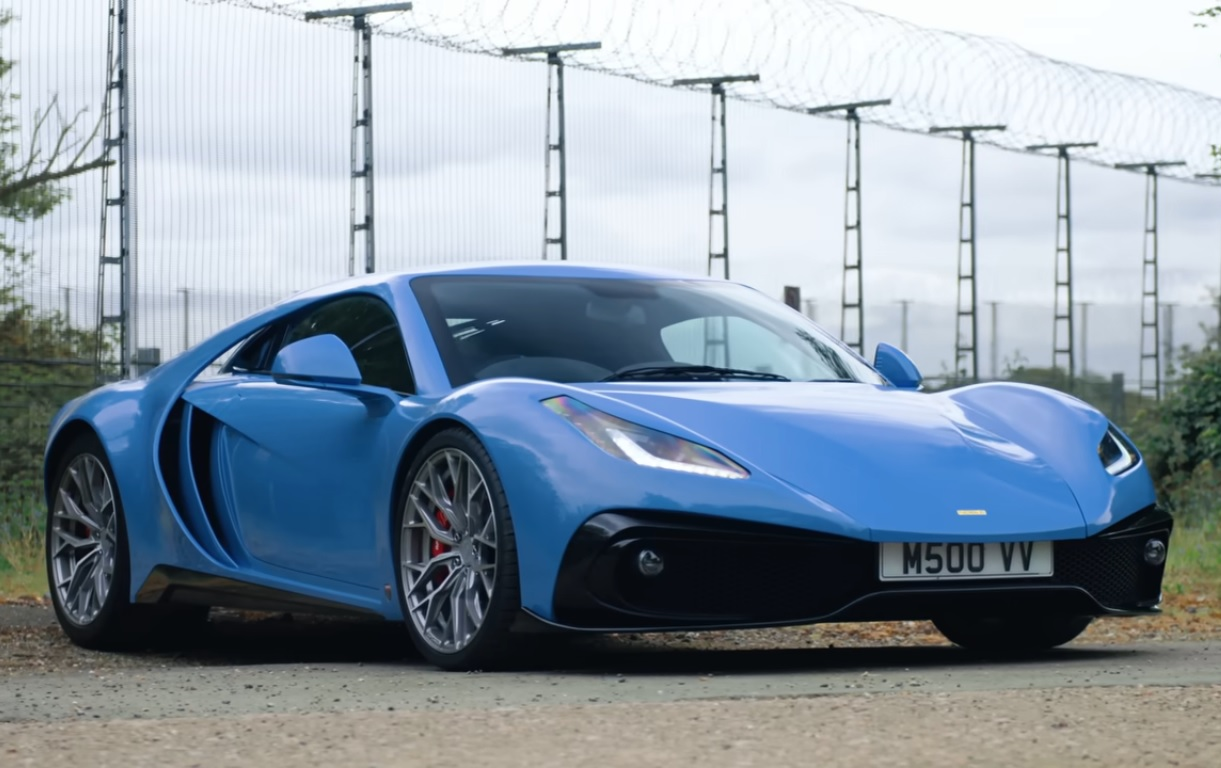

Overview
- Manufacturer: Noble Automotive
- Production: 2022–present
- Assembly: United Kingdom: Leicestershire
- Designer: Peter Boutwood

Body and chassis
- Class: Sports car (S)
- Body style: 2-door coupé
- Layout: Rear mid engine, rear wheel drive

Powertrain
- Engine: 3.5 L D35 twin-turbocharged V6
- Power output: 550 PS (542 hp)
- Transmission: 6-speed manual transmission

Dimensions
- Curb weight: 1,350 kg (2,976 lb)

The Noble M500 is a sports car that was unveiled by low volume automobile manufacturer Noble Automotive in 2018. Sales started in late 2022, but there were modifications from the original concept. The body work is made of carbon fibre but it is more lightweight than most super cars and is sometimes called a "junior supercar".

The interior has three screens; one for the speedometer, tachometer and fuel gauge. One is a satnav and the last one controls the heat, which is close to the gearstick. The interior is quite minimalist, compared to the exterior.
