= Volvo S80 =

Swedish executive sedan

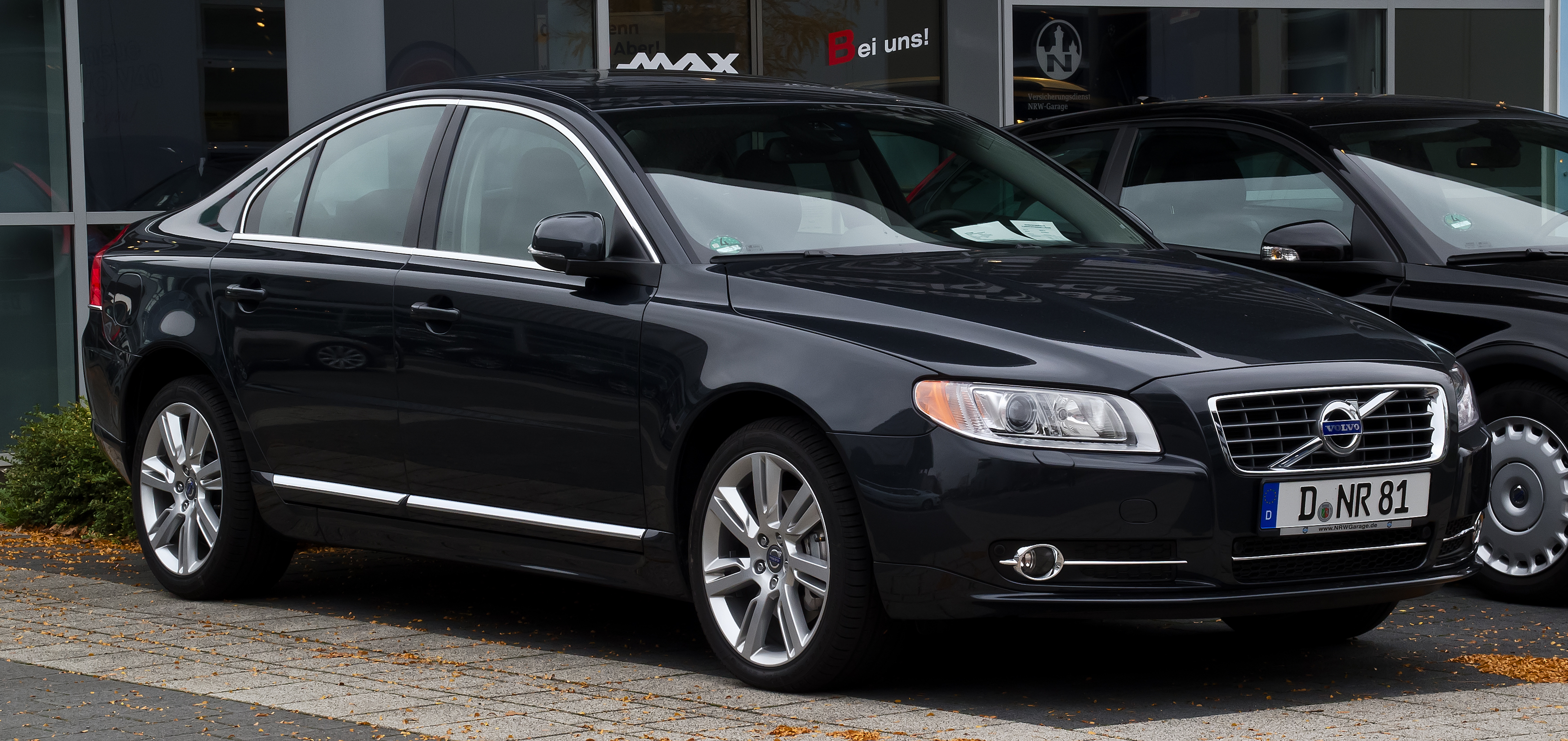
- 2012 Volvo S80 (DE)

Overview
- Manufacturer: Volvo Cars
- Production: 1998–2016; P2: August 1998–2006 (1st generation); P3: 2006–2016 (2nd generation)

Body and chassis
- Class: Mid-size luxury / Executive car (E)
- Body style: 4-door saloon
- Layout: Transverse Front engine; front-wheel drive or four-wheel drive

Chronology
- Predecessor: Volvo 940 / Volvo 960 / Volvo S90 Sedan
- Successor: Volvo S90 II

The Volvo S80 is an executive car produced by the Swedish manufacturer Volvo Cars from 1998 to 2016 across two generations. It took the place of the rear-wheel-drive S90 as Volvo's flagship sedan.

The first generation (1998–2006) was made available for the 1999 model year. It has since been built at the Torslanda Works in Gothenburg, Sweden, with a few 1999 model year cars for the North American market built at Volvo's Halifax Assembly plant. Unlike most Volvo models, it did not have a station wagon version for its first generation.

The second generation (2006–2016) was released in 2006 for the 2007 model year. It has an estate version, the third generation of the Volvo V70. In June 2007, the S80 scored the highest "good" rating in the Insurance Institute for Highway Safety (IIHS) crash test performance for frontal, side, and rear impacts, earning it the IIHS Top Safety Pick.

The model was replaced by the second generation S90 in the later half of 2016.

== First generation (1998–2006) ==
First generation
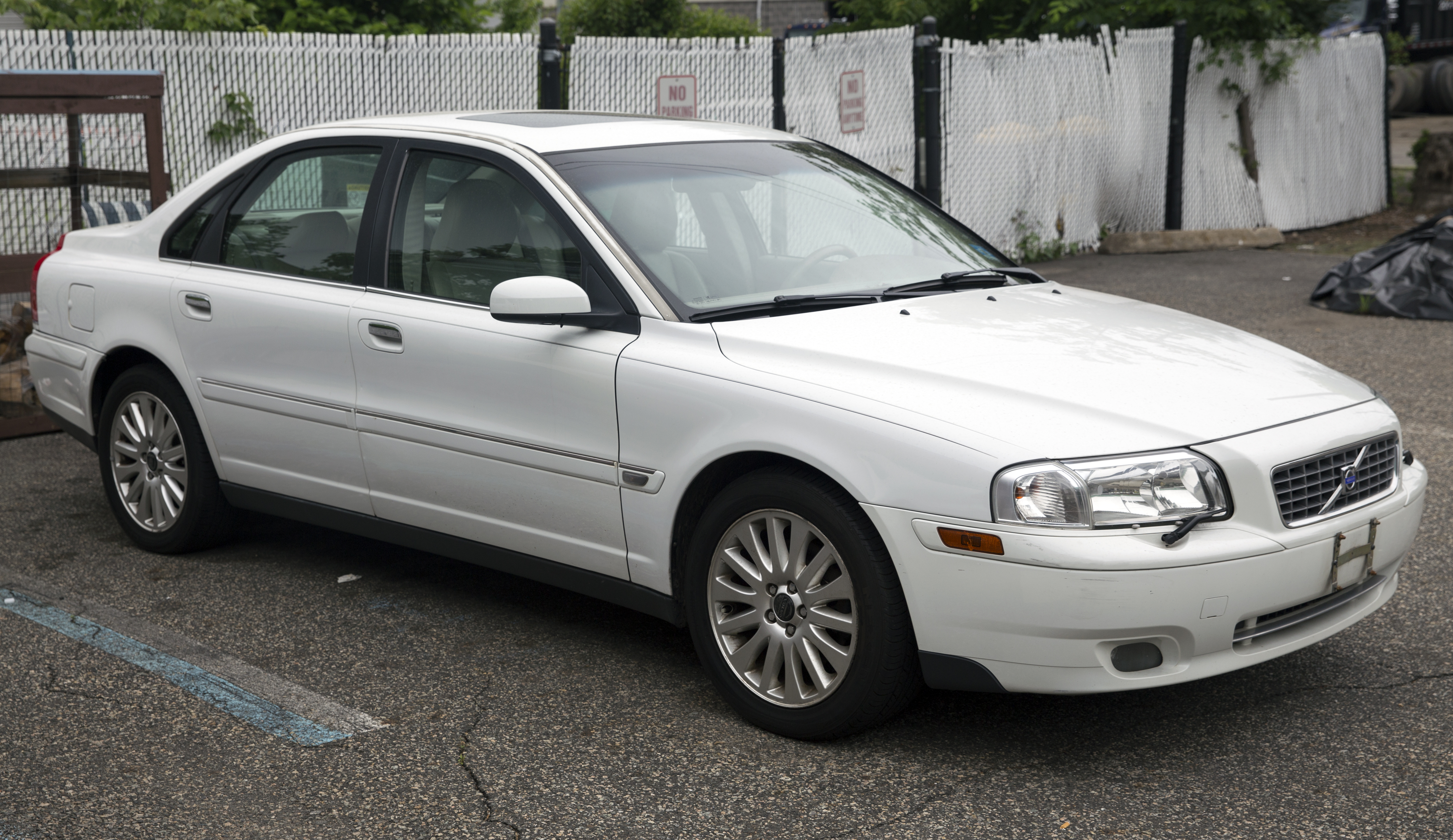
- 2004 Volvo S80 (US)

Overview
- Production: August 1998–2006
- Model years: 1999–2006
- Assembly: Sweden: Torslanda (Torslandaverken); Canada: Halifax (VHA); Malaysia: Shah Alam (SMA)
- Designer: Doug Frasher; Peter Horbury

Body and chassis
- Layout: Front-engine, front-wheel-drive Front-engine, all-wheel-drive
- Platform: Volvo P2 platform
- Related: Volvo S60; Volvo V70 II; Volvo XC90

Powertrain
- Engine: 2.0 L I5 turbo (petrol); 2.3 L B5234T7 turbo I5 (petrol; Thailand); 2.4 L I5 (petrol); 2.4 L I5 (CNG/LPG); 2.5 L I5 (petrol); 2.8 L I6 twin-turbo (petrol); 2.9 L I6 (petrol); 2.9 L I6 twin-turbo (petrol); 2.4 L I5 (turbodiesel); 2.5 L I5 (turbodiesel)
- Transmission: 5-speed Volvo M56 manual; 5-speed Volvo M65 manual; 4-speed GM 4T65 AWD automatic; 5-speed Aisin AW55-50/51SN automatic

Dimensions
- Wheelbase: 2,791 mm (109.9 in)
- Length: 1998–2004: 4,822 mm (189.8 in); 2004–2006: 4,849 mm (190.9 in)
- Width: 1,831 mm (72.1 in)
- Height: 1,435 mm (56.5 in)
- Kerb weight: 1,605–1,712 kg (3,538–3,774 lb)

The design takes styling cues from the Volvo ECC concept. The first-generation S80 is based on the Volvo P2 platform. Over 368,000 first-generation S80s were built. The S80 featured a straight-six engine in a transverse engine mounting. No existing manual gearbox would fit in the engine bay with the six-cylinder engine, so Volvo had to develop their own, the M65. It also featured an environmental specification, covering aspects such as allergens from textiles, fuel economy and the life cycle of the car from production to dismantling.

Volvo continued its safety tradition, offering front and rear integrated crumple zones, driver and front passenger dual threshold airbags with a collapsible three-stage steering column, Side Impact Protection System (SIPS) supplemented with air bags for driver and front passenger, along with a side curtain airbag for front and rear passengers, anti-submarine seats, five padded head restraints with Whiplash Protection System (WHIPS), and automatic seat belt pretensioners while front belts also have height adjustment.

The S80 was initially available with four different engines. Starting the range was a detuned 2.4-litre 104 kW (141 PS; 139 bhp) five-cylinder. This was also available as a compressed natural gas (CNG) and as a liquefied petroleum gas (LPG) version. The fully tuned version produced 125 kW (170 PS; 168 bhp). Next up was a 2.9-litre 144 kW (196 PS; 193 bhp) six-cylinder, then 200 kW (272 PS; 268 bhp) T6, and finally, the 103 kW (140 PS; 138 bhp) 2.5-litre Volkswagen-sourced Turbocharged Direct Injection (TDI) diesel engine. The 2.9 has a straight-six engine, while the T6 was powered by a de-bored twin-turbocharged version. The S80 used CAN bus multiplexing wiring to simplify the various electronic components and safety systems and linking the various ECU to save complexity and weight.

In 2000, there was the addition of the 149 kW (203 PS; 200 bhp) 2.5T, available with standard all-wheel drive. The 2.5T model featured a light-pressure turbocharger. and addition of the 149 kW (203 PS; 200 bhp) 2.3T, available in Thailand Version. Late 2001 introduced the 120 kW (163 PS; 161 bhp) five-cylinder common rail diesel D5, detuned to 96 kW (131 PS; 129 bhp) and sold as 2.4D in some markets. In some European countries, the entry level S80 came with a 2.0-litre five-cylinder turbocharged engine producing 182 PS (134 kW; 180 bhp) and a T5 badged S80 with the same engine but tuned to 226 PS (166 kW; 223 bhp) with the help of the Mitsubishi TD04-16t high pressure turbo also found in the early S60 T5s. These were sold in countries such as Portugal where larger capacity engines were penalized by heavy taxes.

In 2004 PremAir was introduced as a standard feature to the exterior radiator surface which converts up to 75 percent of ground level ozone in the radiator cooling air into oxygen, while the Interior Air Quality System cleans the air inside, detects for pollutants and automatically recirculates in comparison to the air outside. The upholstery was available in taupe, light sand or graphite and the leathers were tanned using natural plant materials. The S80 sheet metal content can be recycled, along with other metals that achieved an 85 overall percentage. Dual zone climate control and heated front seats along with a three position drivers memory setting were optional, and anti-smash and grab laminated side windows were available. Retractable sunshades for the rear side door windows and an electronically extendable rear window sunshade were available

The S80 came standard with Volvo's own radio unit, the HU-613, the HU-803 and was later upgraded to the HU-650 and an optional extra HU-850 unit. The HU-850 unit features a 225 or 335-watt power output (depending on optional external amplifier) with three presets: 2CH, 3CH and Dolby Digital Pro Logic II Surround Sound. The Four-C electronically modified suspension became an option on some S80s.

Minor exterior design changes occurred between 2003 and 2004 versions, and in 2005 the Haldex-sourced AWD was available with the 2.5-litre five-cylinder turbo. In 2006 The AWD system was upgraded with a pre-charged, electronically controlled all-wheel drive system called Instant Traction, which consisted of constant hydraulic pressure that would divide available traction to the wheels as needed.

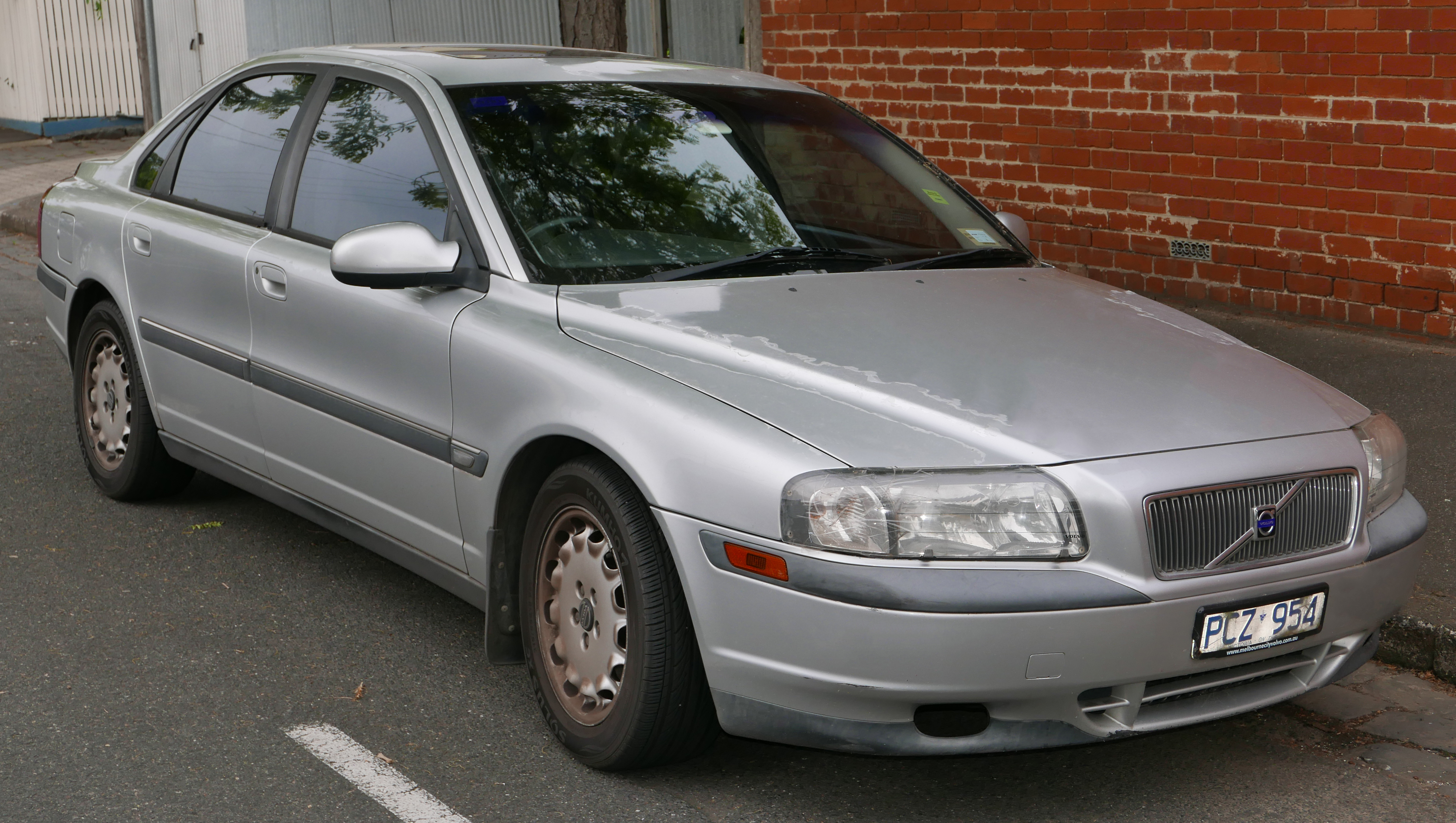
1998 Volvo S80 pre-facelift (AU)

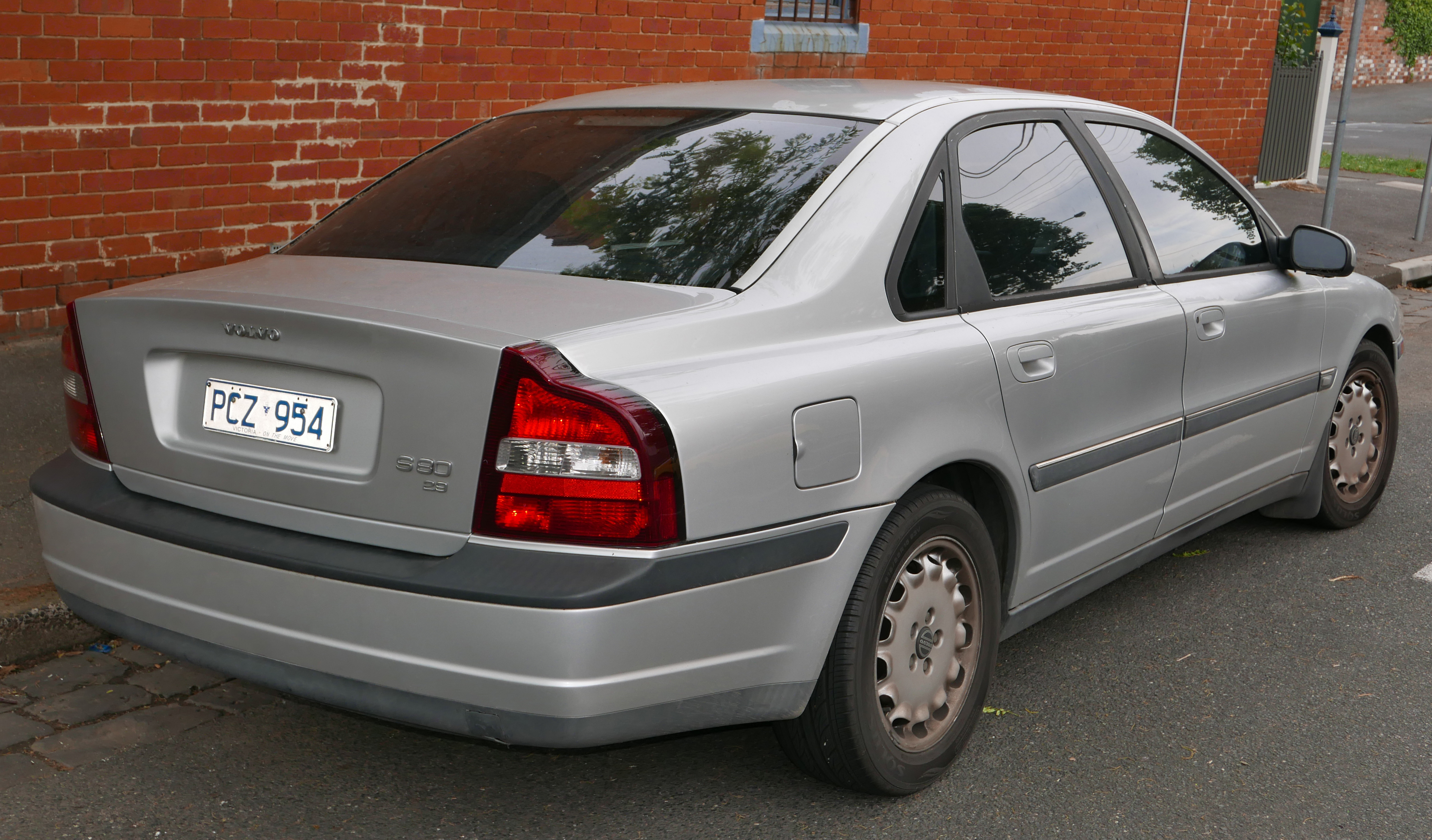
1998 Volvo S80 pre-facelift (AU)

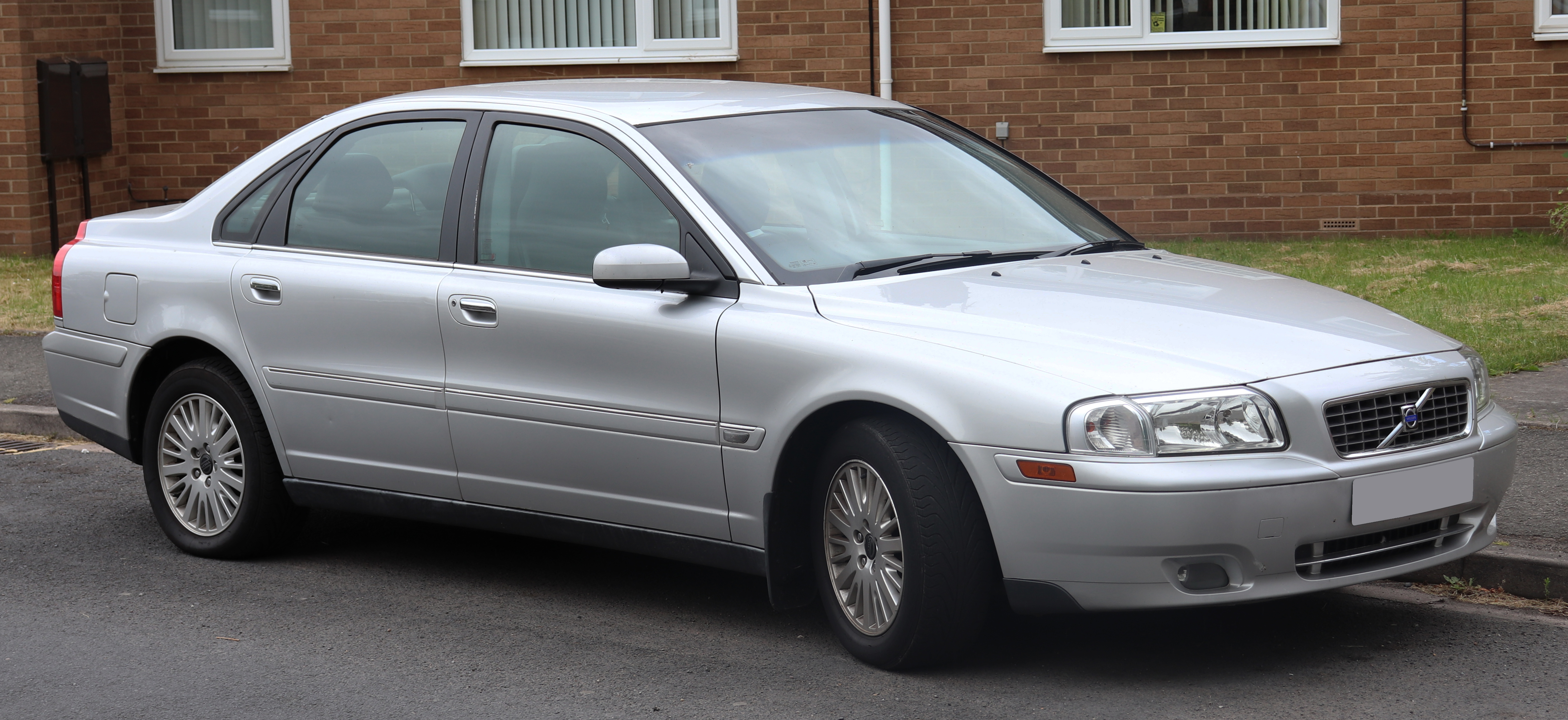
2004 Volvo S80 post facelift (UK)

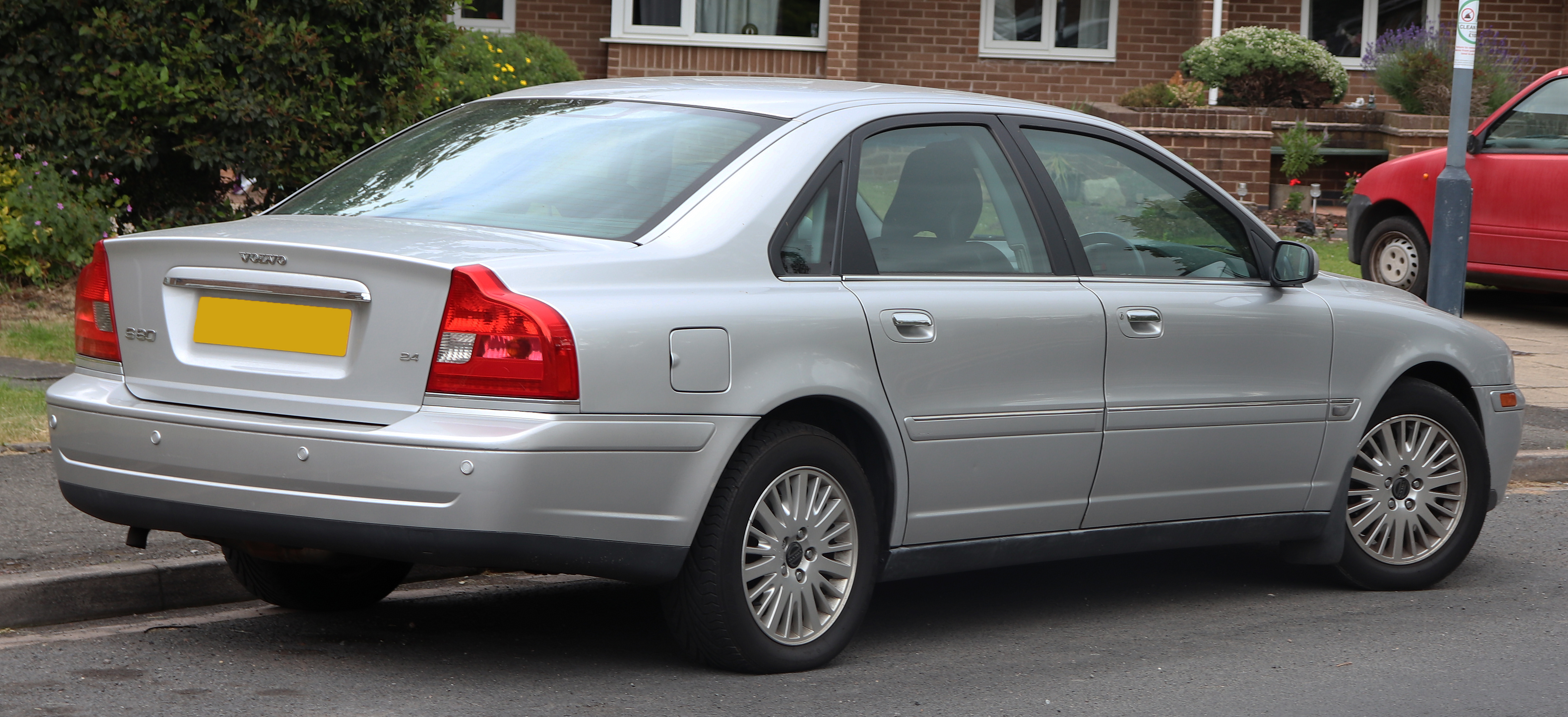
2004 Volvo S80 post facelift (UK)

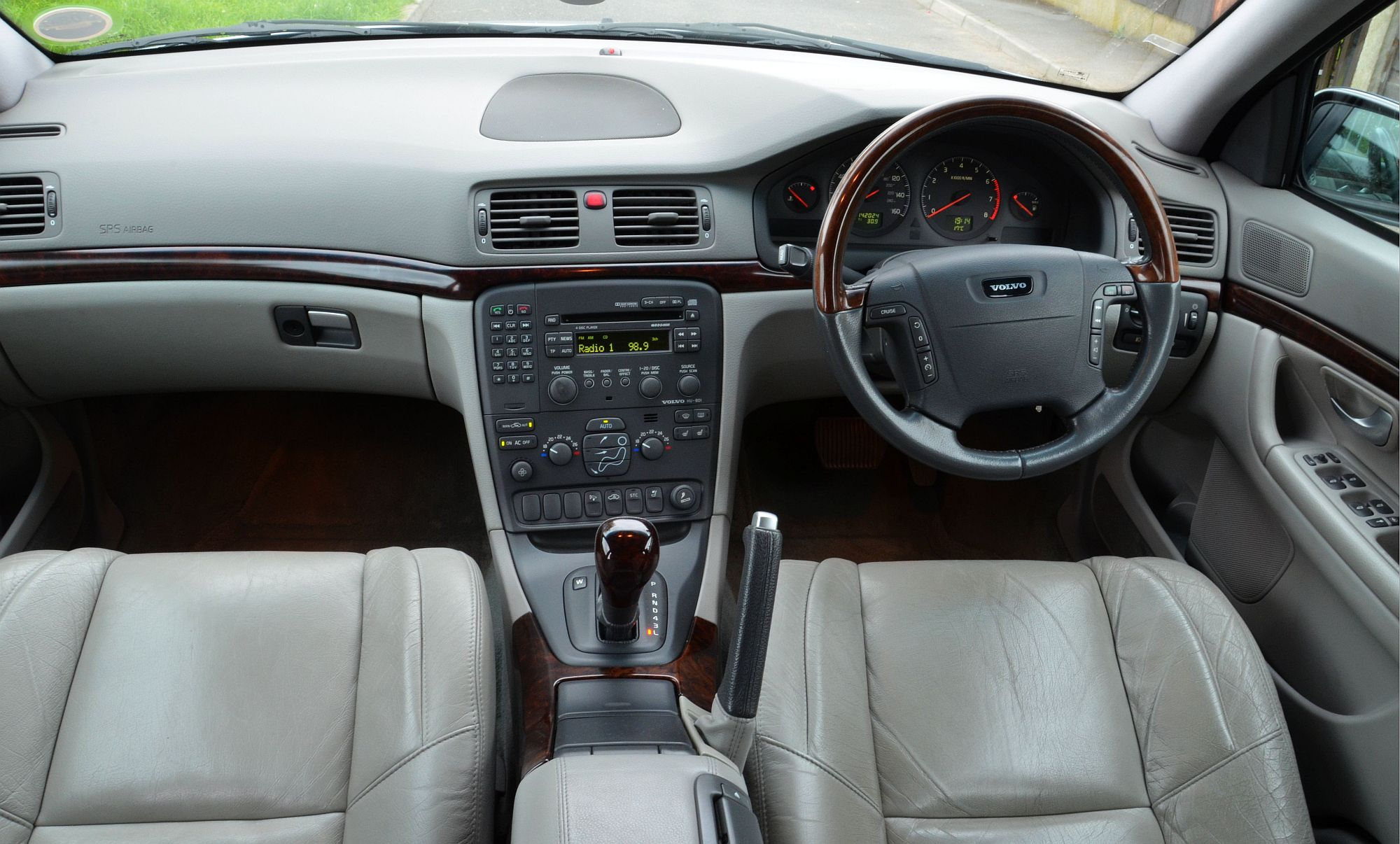
Pre-facelift interior (UK)

=== Engines ===
Petrol engines
Model	Engine code	Year(s)	Power at rpm	Torque at rpm	Displacement	Engine configuration	Fuel Consumption (l/100km)
2.4	B5244S2	1998–2006	103 kW (140 PS; 138 bhp) at 4500	220 N⋅m (162 lb⋅ft) at 3300	2,435 cc (148.6 cu in)	Straight five	City: 12.3; Open road: 6.9; Combined:8.9
2.4i	B5244S	1998–2006	125 kW (170 PS; 168 bhp) at 6000	225 N⋅m (166 lb⋅ft) at 4500	2,435 cc (148.6 cu in)	Straight five	City: 12.3; Open road: 7 Combined: 8.4
2.0T	B5204T5	2000–2006	120 kW (163 PS; 161 bhp) at 5100	230 N⋅m (170 lb⋅ft) at 1800-5000	1,984 cc (121.1 cu in)	Straight five LPT	City: 12.5; Open road: 7.4; Combined: 9.4
2.3T	B5234T7	2000–2004	147 kW (200 PS; 197 bhp) at 5000	285 N⋅m (210 lb⋅ft) at 2000–5000	2,319 cc (141.5 cu in)	Straight five LPT	City: Open road: Combined:
2.4T	B5244T3	2001–2003	147 kW (200 PS; 197 bhp) at 6000	285 N⋅m (210 lb⋅ft) at 1800–5000	2,435 cc (148.6 cu in)	Straight five LPT	City: 12.8; Open road: 7.2; Combined: 9.3
2.5T	B5254T2	2003–2006	154 kW (210 PS; 207 bhp) at 5000	320 N⋅m (236 lb⋅ft) at 1500–4500	2,521 cc (153.8 cu in)	Straight five LPT	City: 12.3; Open road: 6.8; Combined: 9.3
2.9	B6294S	1998–2001	147 kW (200 PS; 197 bhp)	280 N⋅m (207 lb⋅ft) at	2,922 cc (178.3 cu in)	Straight six	City: 15.3; Open road: 7.6; Combined: 10.4
2.9	B6294S2	2001–2004	144 kW (196 PS; 193 bhp) at 5200	280 N⋅m (207 lb⋅ft) at 3900	2,922 cc (178.3 cu in)	Straight six	City: 15.2; Open road: 8.4; Combined: 10.9
T6	B6284T	1998–2001	200 kW (272 PS; 268 bhp)	380 N⋅m (280 lb⋅ft) at 2000–5000	2,783 cc (169.8 cu in)	Straight six twin-turbo	City: 16.6; Open road: 8.2; Combined: 11.3
T6	B6294T	2002–2006	200 kW (272 PS; 268 bhp) at 5200	380 N⋅m (280 lb⋅ft) at 1800–5000	2,922 cc (178.3 cu in)	Straight six twin-turbo	City: 16; Open road: 8.3; Combined: 11.1

Diesel engines
Model	Engine code	Year(s)	Power at rpm	Torque at rpm	Displacement	Engine configuration	Fuel Consumption (l/100km)
2.5 TDI*	D5252T (MSA 15.8)	1998–2001	140 PS (103 kW; 138 bhp) at 4000	290 N⋅m (214 lb⋅ft) at 1900	2,461 cc (150.2 cu in)	Straight five turbocharged	City: 8.8; Open road: 4.9; Combined: 6.4
2.4D	D5244T2	2001–2006	130 PS (96 kW; 128 hp) at 4000	280 N⋅m (207 lb⋅ft) at 1750–3000	2,401 cc (146.5 cu in)	Straight five turbocharged common rail	City: 8.8; Open road: 5.1; Combined: 6.5
D5	D5244T	2001–2006	163 PS (120 kW; 161 hp) at 4000	340 N⋅m (251 lb⋅ft) at 1750–3000	2,401 cc (146.5 cu in)	Straight five turbocharged common rail	City: 9 Open road: 5.1; Combined: 6.5

- *Volvo used a modified version of the 2.5 TDI VAG engine

=== Safety ===
Euro NCAP tested the first generation Volvo S80, running from 1998 to 2003. They tested a left-hand drive, 4-door saloon, registered in 2000, with front seatbelt pretensioners, seatbelt load limiters, as well as front, side, body, and head airbags:

Test	Score	Points
Overall:	N/A	N/A
Adult occupant:	4/5 stars	29
Pedestrian:	2/4 stars	14

Scores given for the car showed pedestrians' legs facing a very aggressive front end, resulting in only 2 stars of 4 for pedestrian safety. Despite this Euro NCAP did state "This large Volvo is very safe and gave a good all-round performance" due to the good adult protection inside the car in the event of a collision.

== Second generation (2006–2016) ==
Second generation
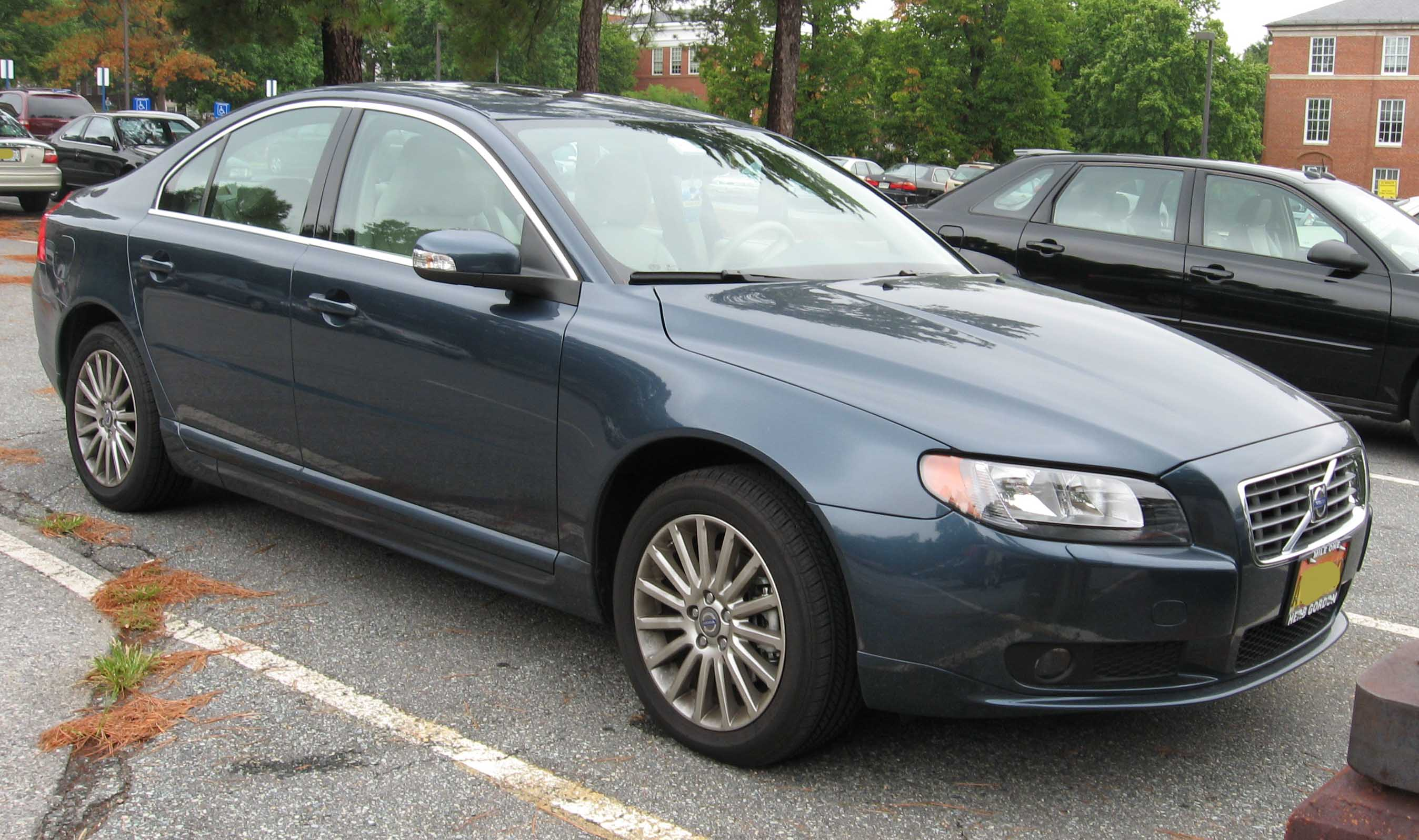
- Volvo S80 3.2 pre-facelift (US)

Overview
- Production: 26 December 2005–2016 (LHD); October 2006–2016 (RHD)
- Model years: 2007–2016
- Assembly: Sweden: Torslanda (Torslandaverken); China: Chongqing (CFMA); Malaysia: Shah Alam (SMA)
- Designer: Todd Levy (2004)

Body and chassis
- Platform: Volvo P3 platform
- Related: Volvo V70 III; Volvo XC60

Powertrain
- Engine: 1.6 L EcoBoost I4 turbo (petrol); 2.0 L B4204S3 I4 (petrol); 2.0 L B4204S4 I4 (flexifuel); 2.0 L B4204T I4 turbo (petrol); 2.5 L B5254T I5 turbo (flexifuel); 2.5 L B5254T I5 turbo (petrol); 3.0 L B6304 I6 turbo (petrol); 3.2 L B6324 I6 (petrol); 4.4 L B8444S V8 (petrol); 1.6 L D4164 I4 (turbodiesel); 2.0 L D4204 I4 (turbodiesel); 2.0 L D5204 I5 (turbodiesel); 2.4 L D5244 I5 (turbodiesel)
- Transmission: 5-speed Ford MTX75 manual; 6-speed Volvo M66 manual; 6-speed Aisin-Warner AWTF-80 SC automatic; 6-speed Ford PowerShift dual-clutch automatic; 8-speed Aisin TG-81SC automatic

Dimensions
- Wheelbase: 2,835 mm (111.6 in); 2,975 mm (117.1 in) (S80L)
- Length: 4,854 mm (191.1 in); 4,991 mm (196.5 in) (S80L)
- Width: 1,861 mm (73.3 in)
- Height: 1,490 mm (58.7 in)
- Kerb weight: 1,565–1,860 kg (3,450–4,101 lb)

The second generation S80 was unveiled at the 2006 Geneva Motor Show on 28 February, with sales beginning in June 2006. It was offered with newly designed 3.2-litre straight-six or 4.4-litre V8 engine options, in combination with available four-wheel drive. The second-generation S80 is the first Volvo saloon model to become available with Volvo's compact, transversely fitted B8444S V8 with a power output of 315 PS (232 kW; 311 hp) and 440 N⋅m (325 lbf⋅ft) of torque developed jointly by Volvo Cars engine unit Skövde and Yamaha, but built by Yamaha of Japan. The engine features four catalytic converters and advanced electronics. The structure featured high strength boron steel for safety.

The second generation S80 received the IIHS 2007 Top Safety Pick Award in overall safety protection. Also again in November the IIHS awarded the 2008 Volvo S80 with Top Safety Award.

The new S80 is based on the Volvo P3 platform, also used for vehicles including the Ford S-Max, third generation Ford Mondeo, and Ford Galaxy large MPVs. Volvo's Personal Car Communicator (PCC) remote control will also be an optional feature with the new S80.

The S80 is available with optional adaptive cruise control (ACC) with collision warning with auto brake (CWAB). Brake support offers additional assistance by preparing the braking system so that the car can begin stopping faster and preparing for panic brake application. S80 is also equipped with an adaptive brake light as standard which is active at speeds above 30 mph (48 km/h), and can sense the difference between normal and panic braking. Ready alert brakes (RAB) are also available to anticipate severe braking. It prepares for this by moving the brake pads closer to the discs.

The S80 is available with a Blind Spot Information System as well as Lane Departure Warning, it can be turned on from 40 mph (64 km/h).

The T4 variant features the 1.6L turbocharged EcoBoost engine and is exclusively available in Asia and parts of Europe.

=== Second generation models ===
==== S80 ====
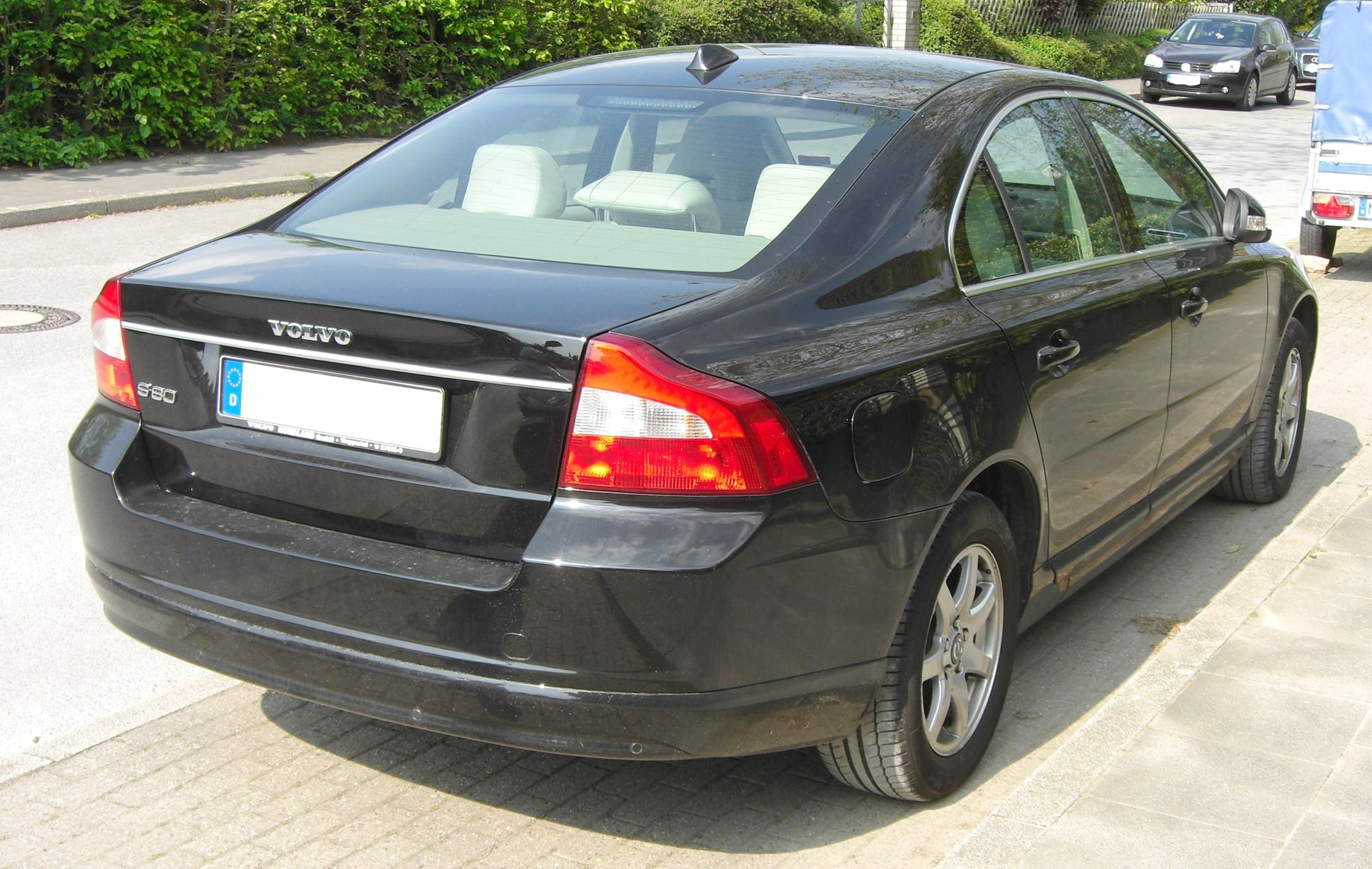
Volvo S80 pre-facelift (DE)

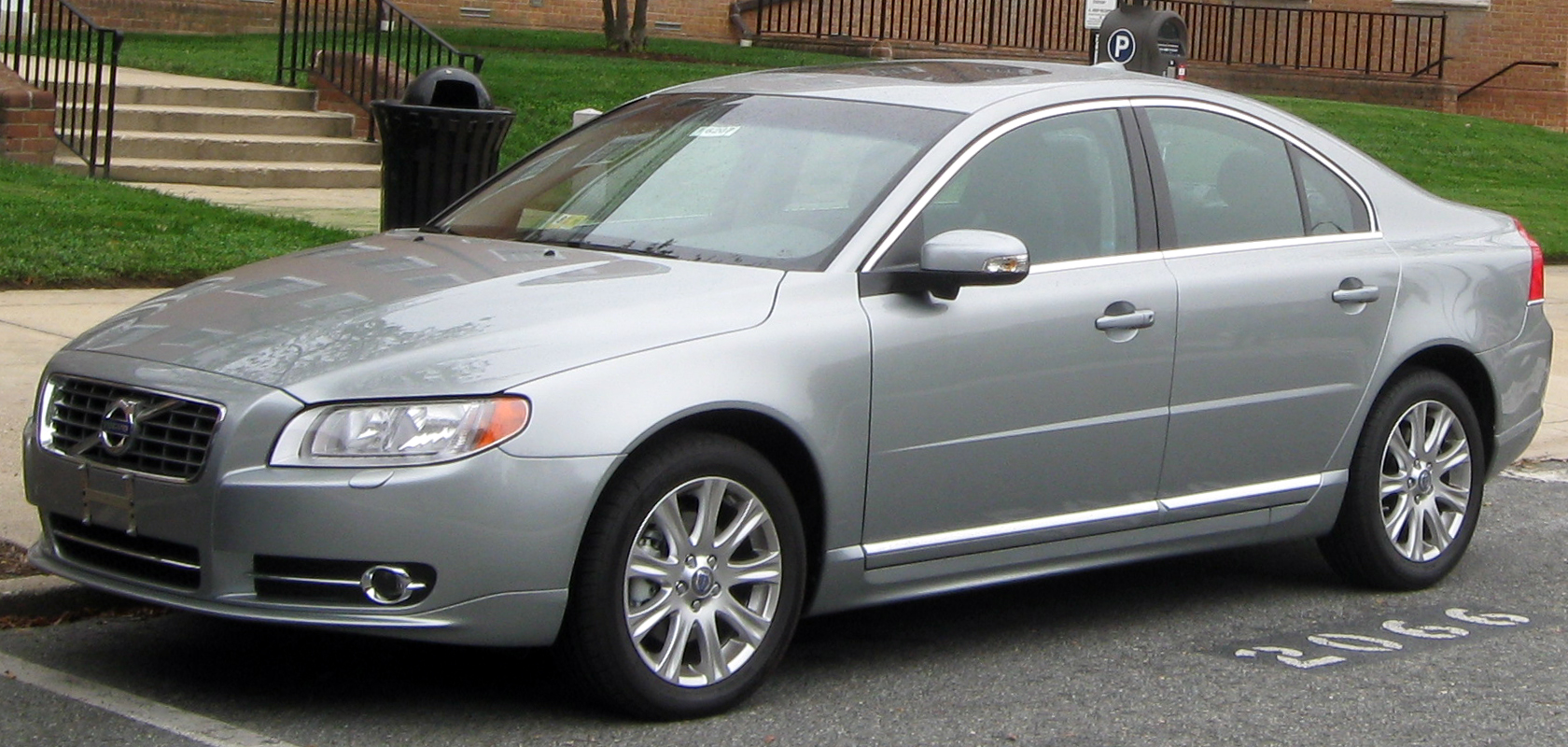
Volvo S80 post first-facelift (US)

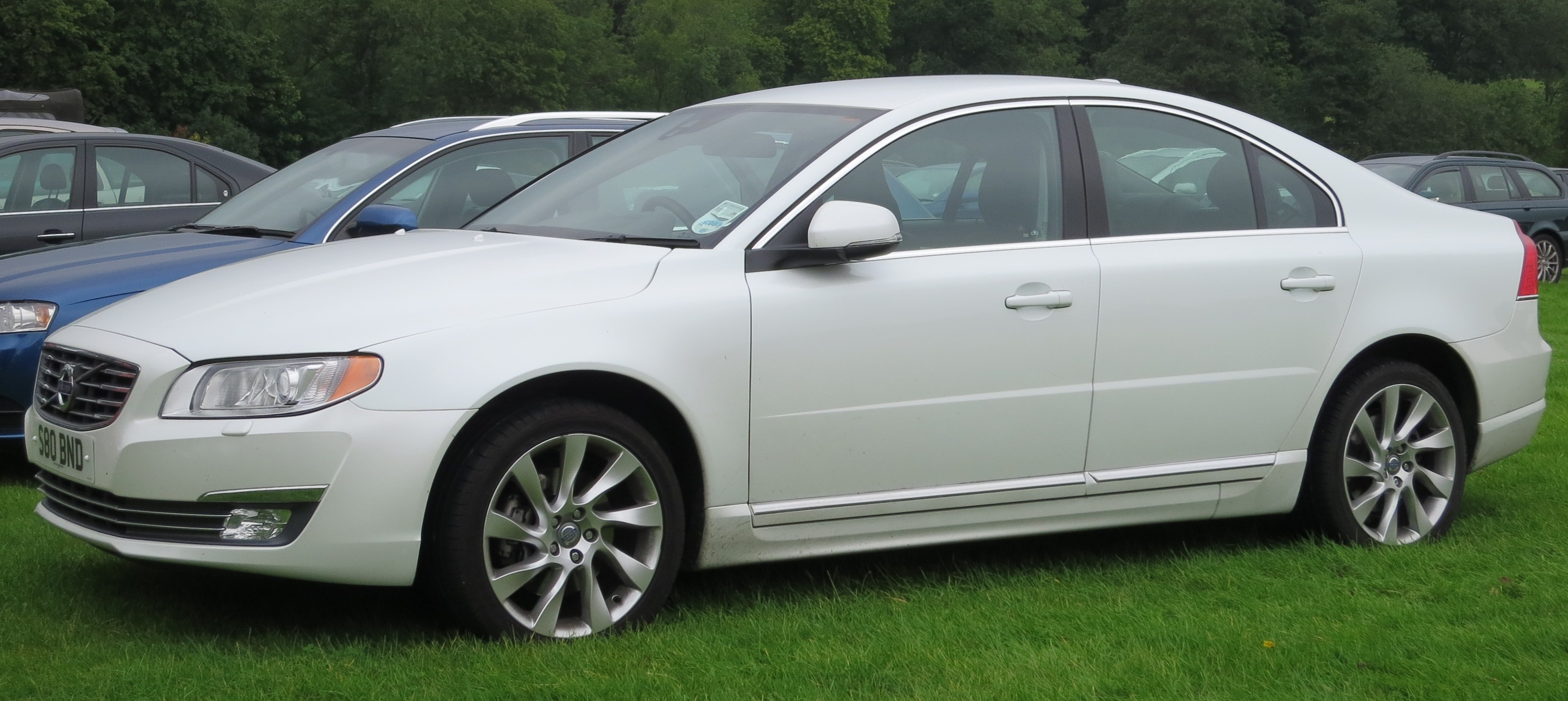
Volvo S80 post second-facelift (UK)

==== S80L ====
The S80L is a long-wheelbase variant designed and sold only in China. Wheelbase and overall length have been increased by 14 cm. The 2011 version has a wheelbase of 2,975 mm (117.1 in) and is powered by a turbocharged 2.0 or 3.0L engine. The S80L is one of two Volvo models produced under a joint-venture with Changan Ford Mazda Automobile (CFMA). CFMA production of the S80L commenced in 2009 and ceased in late 2015 when the joint-venture ended. The S80L has since been succeeded by the S90L.

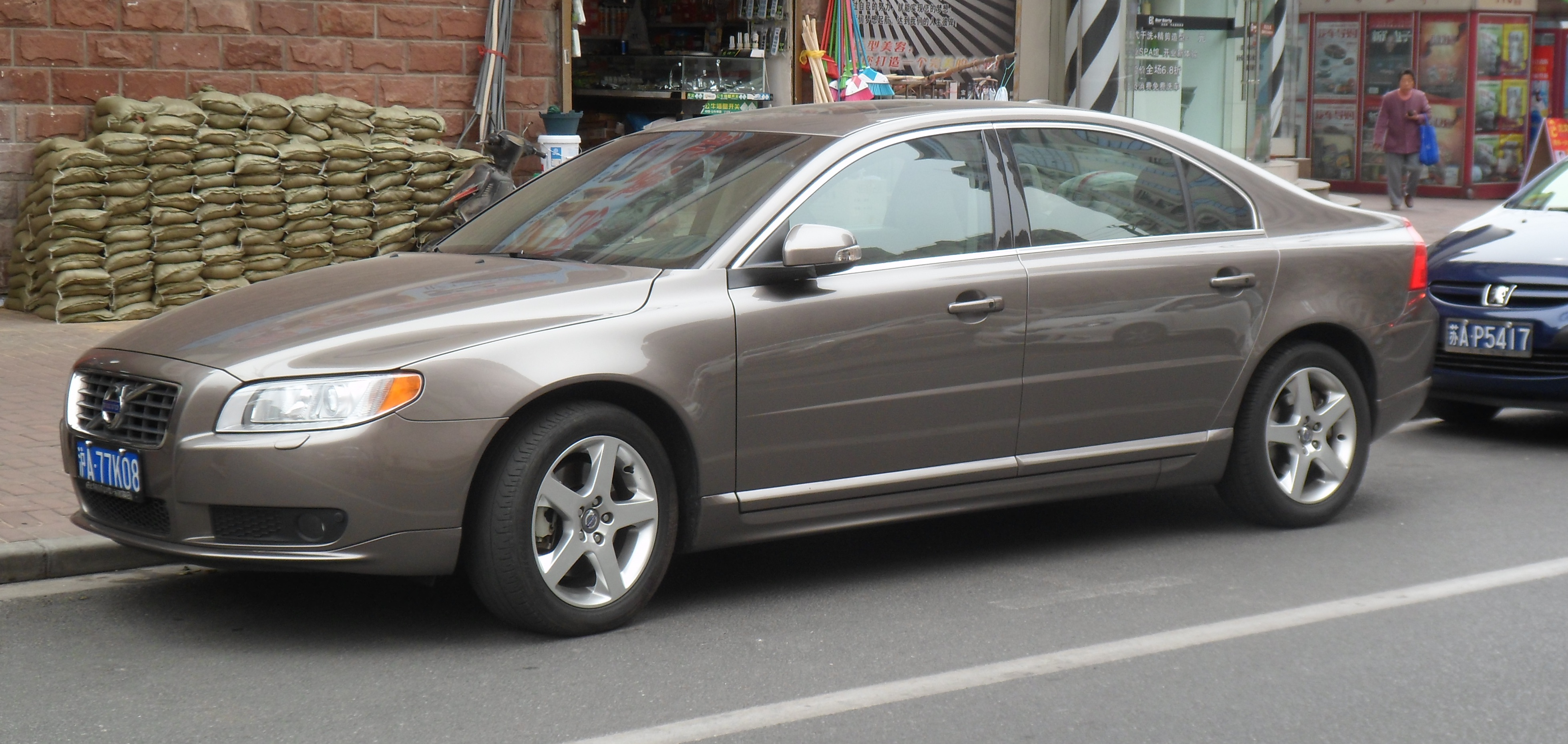
Volvo S80L (pre-facelift, China)

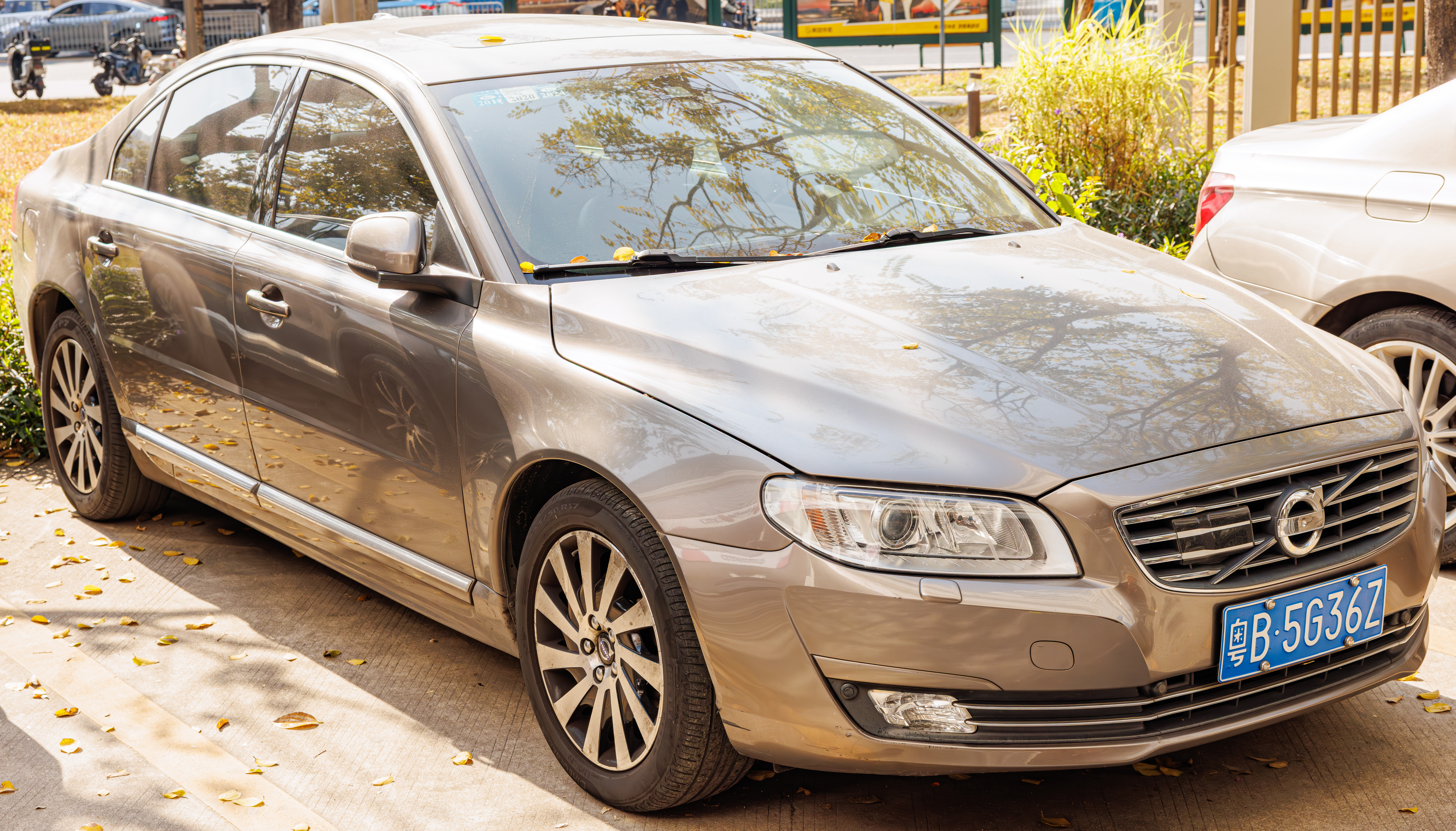
Volvo S80L (facelift, China)

=== 2010 update ===
New features for 2010 include a choice of five-cylinder 2.4-litre D5 twin-turbo diesel, 2.4-litre diesel, or 1.6-litre diesel engine. Also the 2.5T and 2.5FT were modified to produce more power and have a lower fuel consumption. The update marked the last year of the Yamaha-based V8 engine. An option was added for California on the 3.2L Inline-6 to meet PZEV emissions standards. It had 225 bhp, 10 less than the non-PZEV engine. The car's exterior was modified to give the S80 a lower, longer and wider stance. More chrome trim was added to the front, the rear end, and the doors to look like the S80 Executive. The 2010 Volvo S80 facelift also comes with a choice between a comfort-enhancing standard chassis, or a sport one that offers better handling dynamics. The 2010 S80 will be available with a S80 R-design interior package to give the inside a sportier look. The interior package contains a new sports steering wheel, sports pedals, Dynamic leather seats, sports gearshift knob, and a new instrument with blue background.

The car was unveiled in 2009 at the Geneva Motor Show.

=== 2011 ===
The 2011 Volvo S80 lineup now includes the Inscription Package. Features Include: Sovereign Hide leather seats, high gloss walnut wood inlays, and special trim. The 3.2L was re-tuned, power and engine speed differ. The Dynaudio Premium Sound option is downgraded to 'Premium Sound'.

=== 2012 ===
The 2012 Volvo S80 now features a new 7-inch Sensus infotainment system in the center of the dash, genuine wood interior trim and Bluetooth audio streaming. Volvo's City Safety technology is also now standard. Premier Plus and Platinum trims are added for the 2012 model year.

=== 2013 update ===
The 2013 Volvo S80 now features standard headlight washers, rain sensing wipers, and push button start ignition. The Premium Plus edition adds xenon headlamps.

=== 2014 update ===
The 2nd half of year 2014 introduced a new facelift with new front and rear bumpers, new lower front fascia, new grille style, the 7-inch infotainment system becomes standard, City Safety becomes standard, new optional digital gauge cluster, and additional interior ambient lighting.

=== 2015 ===
The base 2015 Volvo S80 is powered by a new turbocharged 2.0-liter four-cylinder engine with 240 horsepower, which is the same output as the 3.2-liter six-cylinder in the 2014 model. A new eight-speed automatic transmission comes standard, and the base S80 also gets a new auto start/stop feature, which turns the engine off when the car is stopped to conserve fuel. The 2015 S80 achieves an EPA-estimated 25/37 mpg city/highway, which is a notable improvement over the 2014 model's 20/29 mpg rating. T6 AWD models come with a turbocharged 3.0-liter six-cylinder engine that produces 300 horsepower. A six-speed automatic transmission and all-wheel drive are also standard on T6 models. The T6 gets slightly better fuel economy than the 2014 model T6.

An optional climate package includes heated front and rear seats, a heated windshield and a heated steering wheel. The 2015 Volvo S80 went on sale in early 2014 and starts at $40,500 in the US.

=== 2015.5 ===
Introduced in late 2014, midyear changes introduced for the 2015.5 model include new standard Sensus Connect and Volvo On-Call with 6-month complimentary subscriptions, new Sensus Navigation with Map Care, and a new optional Harman/Kardon Premium Sound System. Most notably, the new 2015.5 model has significantly better fuel economy due to the more efficient "Drive-E" engine, new 8-speed "Geartronic" automatic transmission, and new ECO+ functionality with modified Start/Stop technology, ECO-coast and ECO-climate. The 2015.5 Volvo S80 starts at $41,450 in the US.

=== 2016 ===
The Volvo S80 offered an expanded array of standard features for 2016 which includes heated front seats, Interior Air Quality System (IAQS), power glass sunroof, and 18-inch "Magni" alloy wheels. The S80 T5 Drive-E Platinum trim gains Volvo's Blind Spot Information System (BLIS) as standard. New S80 options include a wood steering wheel and 19-inch "Bor" alloy wheels with a lowered Sport Chassis. The T6 six-cylinder engine and all-wheel-drive model have been discontinued for the 2016 model year. The 2016 Volvo S80 T5 FWD Drive-E started at $43,450 in the US. 2016 was the last model year for the S80. The S80s successor, the S90, was unveiled at the Detroit Auto Show in January 2016.

=== Engines ===
Petrol engines
Model	Engine code	Year(s)	Power	Torque at rpm	Displacement	Engine configuration
2.0	B4204S3	2007–2010	107 kW (145 PS; 143 bhp) at 6000	190 N⋅m (140 lb⋅ft) at 4500	1,999 cc (122.0 cu in)	Inline-four
2.0F	B4204S4	2007–2010	107 kW (145 PS; 143 bhp) at 6000	190 N⋅m (140 lb⋅ft) at 4500	1,999 cc (122.0 cu in)	Inline-four; Flexifuel
2.0T	B4204T6	2010–2011	149 kW (203 PS; 200 bhp) at 6000	300 N⋅m (220 lb⋅ft) at 1750-4000	1,999 cc (122.0 cu in)	Inline-four with turbocharger
2.5T	B5254T6	2006–2009	147 kW (200 PS; 197 bhp) at 4800	300 N⋅m (221 lb⋅ft) at 1500–4500	2,521 cc (153.8 cu in)	Inline-five LPT
2.5FT	B5254T8	2008–2009	147 kW (200 PS; 197 bhp) at 4800	300 N⋅m (221 lb⋅ft) at 1500-4500	2,521 cc (153.8 cu in)	Inline-five LPT; Flexifuel
2.5T	B5254T10	2009–2010	170 kW (231 PS; 228 bhp) at 4800	340 N⋅m (251 lb⋅ft) at 1700–4800	2,521 cc (153.8 cu in)	Inline-five LPT
2.5FT	B5254T11	2009–2010	170 kW (231 PS; 228 bhp) at 4800	340 N⋅m (251 lb⋅ft) at 1700-4800	2,521 cc (153.8 cu in)	Inline-five LPT; Flexifuel
3.2; 3.2 AWD	B6324S	2006–2010	175 kW (238 PS; 235 bhp) at 6200	320 N⋅m (236 lb⋅ft) at 3200	3,192 cc (194.8 cu in)	Inline-six
3.2	B6324S5	2011	179 kW (243PS; 240 bhp) at 6400	320 N⋅m (236 lb⋅ft) at 3200	3,192 cc (194.8 cu in)	Inline-six
3.2 PZEV	B6324S2	2010	168 kW (228PS; 225 bhp) at 6200	300 N⋅m (221 lb⋅ft) at 3400	3,192 cc (194.8 cu in)	Inline-six
3.2 PZEV	B6324S4	2011	171 kW (233PS; 230 bhp) at 6500	300 N⋅m (221 lb⋅ft) at 3300	3,192 cc (194.8 cu in)	Inline-six
T4	B4164T	2011–2016	134 kW (182 PS; 180 bhp)	240 N⋅m (177 lb⋅ft) at	1,596 cc (97.4 cu in)	Inline-four turbocharged
T5	B4204T7	2013–2016	180 kW (245 PS; 241 bhp)	350 N⋅m (258 lb⋅ft) at	1,969 cc (120.2 cu in)	Inline-four turbocharged
T5	B4204T11	2014–2016	180 kW (245 PS; 241 bhp)	350 N⋅m (258 lb⋅ft) at	1,969 cc (120.2 cu in)	Inline-four turbocharged
T6 AWD	B6304T2	2008–2010	209.5 kW (285 PS; 281 bhp)	400 N⋅m (295 lb⋅ft) at 1500–4800	2,953 cc (180.2 cu in)	Inline-six turbocharged
T6 AWD	B6304T4	2010–2014	224 kW (305 PS; 300 bhp)	440 N⋅m (325 lb⋅ft) at	2,953 cc (180.2 cu in)	Inline-six turbocharged
V8; V8 AWD	B8444S	2006–2010	232 kW (315 PS; 311 bhp)	440 N⋅m (325 lb⋅ft) at 3950	4,414 cc (269.4 cu in)	V8

Diesel engines
Model	Engine Code	Year(s)	Power	Torque at rpm	Displacement	Engine configuration!
1.6D DRIVe	D4164T	2009–	80 kW (109 PS; 107 bhp)	240 N⋅m (177 lb⋅ft) at 1750	1,560 cc (95.2 cu in)	Inline-four turbocharged common rail
2.0D	D4204T	2008–	100 kW (136 PS; 134 bhp)	320 N⋅m (236 lb⋅ft) at 2000	1,997 cc (121.9 cu in)	Inline-four turbocharged common rail
2.4D	D5244T5	2006–2009	120 kW (163 PS; 161 bhp)	340 N⋅m (251 lb⋅ft) at	2,400 cc (146.5 cu in)	Inline-five turbocharged common rail
2.4D	D5244T14	2009–	129 kW (175 PS; 173 bhp)	420 N⋅m (310 lb⋅ft) at 1500–2750	2,400 cc (146.5 cu in)	Inline-five turbocharged common rail
D4	D5204T3	−2014	120 kW (163 PS; 161 bhp)	400 N⋅m (295 lb⋅ft) at	1,984 cc (121.1 cu in)	Inline-five turbocharged common rail
D4	D4204T5	2014–2016	133 kW (181 PS; 178 bhp)	400 N⋅m (295 lb⋅ft) at	1,969 cc (120.2 cu in)	Inline-four turbocharged common rail
D5; D5 AWD	D5244T4	2006–2009	136 kW (185 PS; 182 bhp)	400 N⋅m (295 lb⋅ft) at	2,400 cc (146.5 cu in)	Inline-five turbocharged common rail
D5; D5 AWD	D5244T10	2009–2010	151 kW (205 PS; 202 bhp)	420 N⋅m (310 lb⋅ft) at 1500–3250	2,400 cc (146.5 cu in)	Inline-five twin-turbo common rail
D5; D5 AWD	D5244TX	201X–201X	158 kW (215 PS; 212 bhp)	420 N⋅m (310 lb⋅ft) at	2,400 cc (146.5 cu in)	Inline-five twin-turbo common rail

=== Safety ===
IIHS S80:
Moderate overlap frontal offset	Good
Small overlap frontal offset	Good^{1}
Side impact	Good
Roof strength	Good^{2}

^{1} vehicle structure rated "Good"
^{2} strength-to-weight ratio: 4.26

== Special versions ==
The S80 is also used as a base for specialised cars such as lengthened limousines, hearses, and ambulances. One company producing such models is Nilsson Special Vehicles, based in Laholm, Sweden. Ambulance models receive a completely new body from behind the b-pillar as well as a raised roof. A sliding side door is installed on the right hand side (sometimes on both sides) and the tailgate is enlarged to allow easier access. Nilsson only manufactured ambulances based on the first generation S80. Nilsson has built limousines and hearses based on both generations of the S80. They also manufacture the official state car for a few heads of state, including for the King of Sweden and the King of the Netherlands.

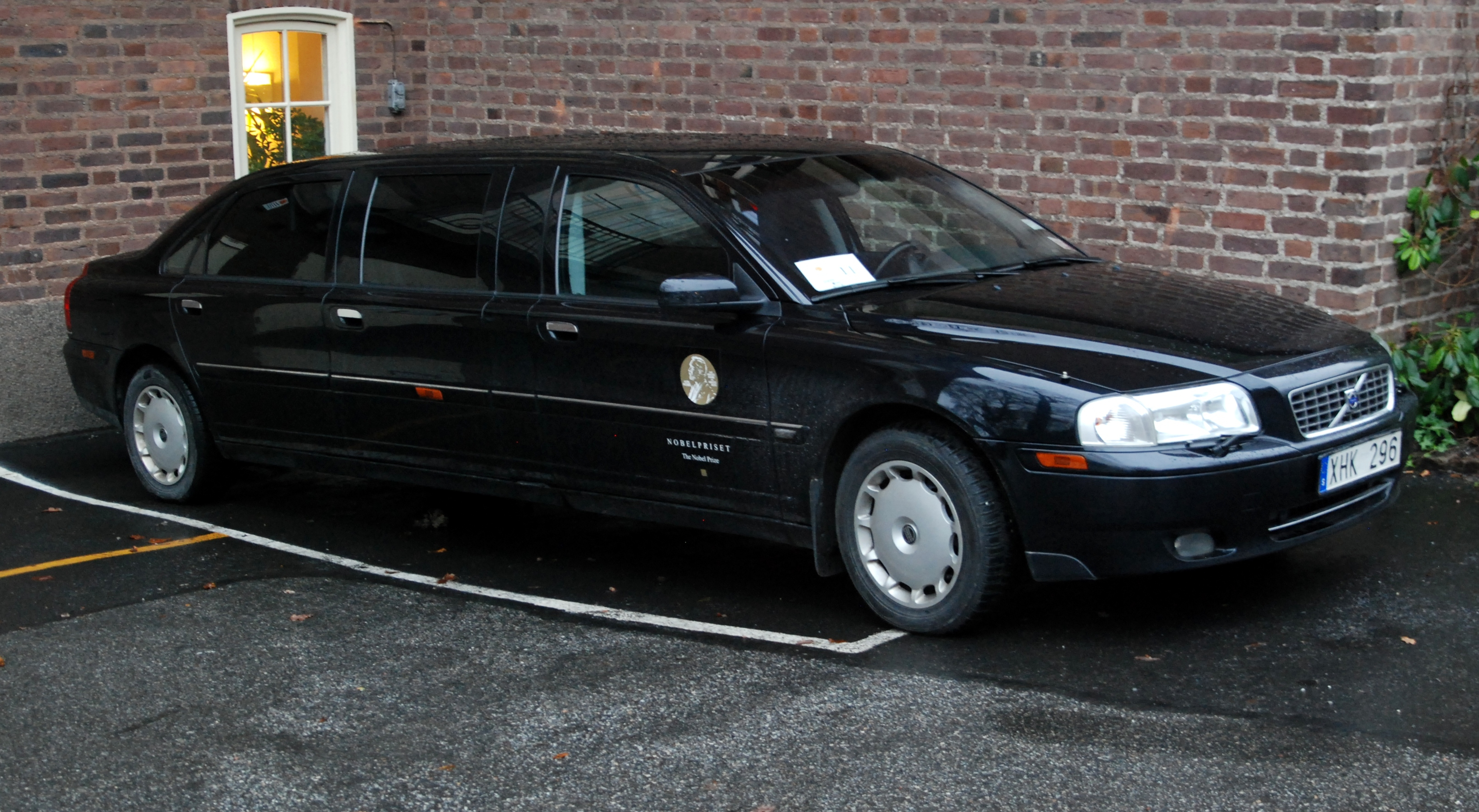
Stretched first generation S80 with six doors (SE)

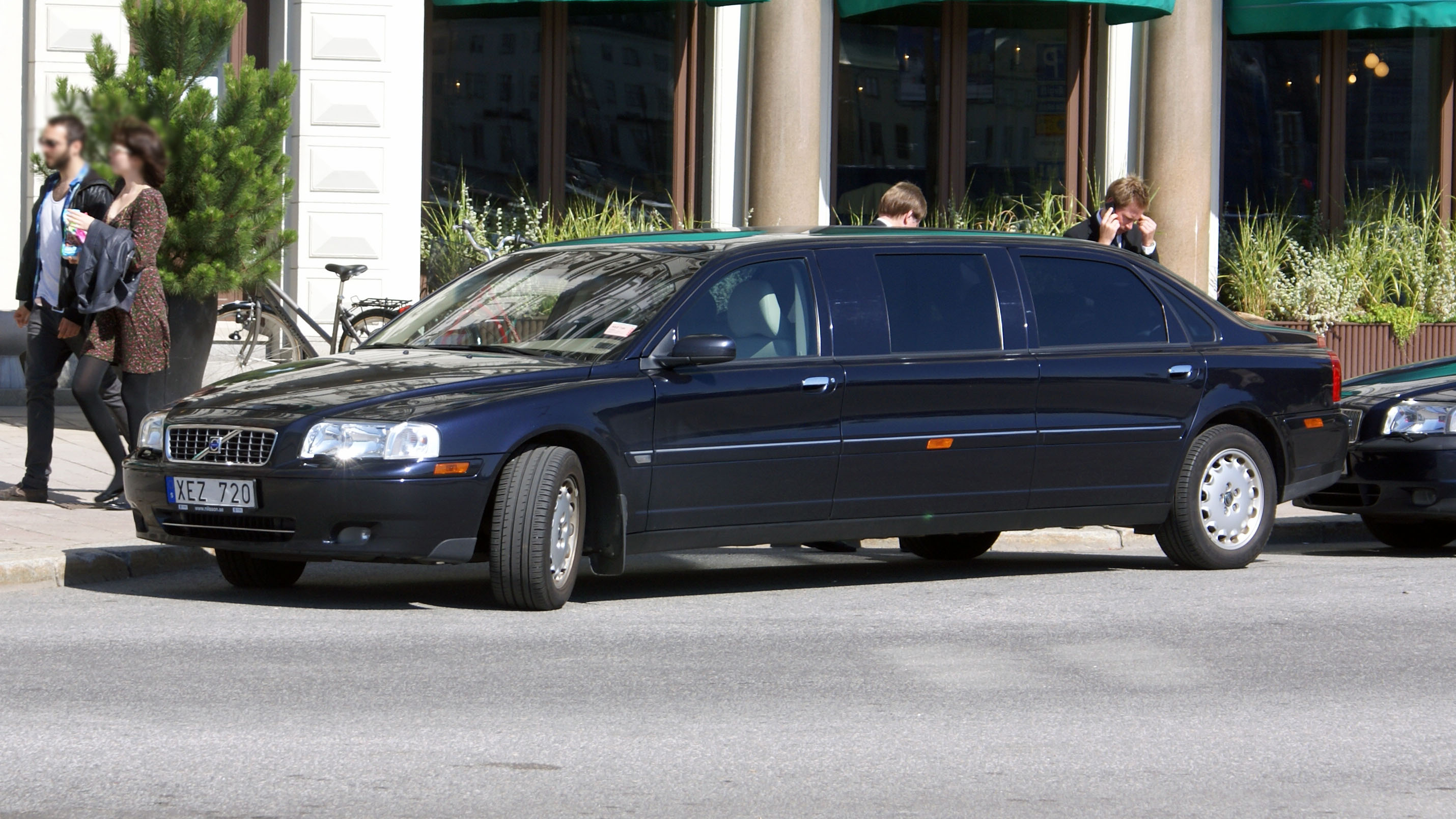
Stretched first generation S80 with four doors (SE)

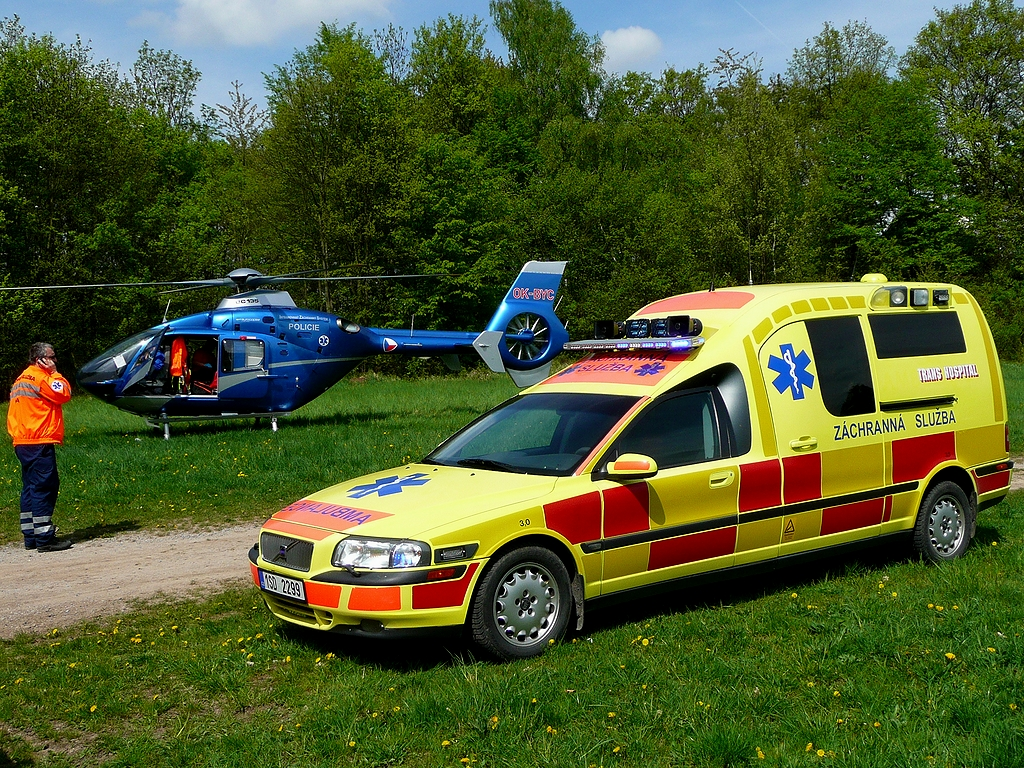
First generation S80 ambulance (CZ)

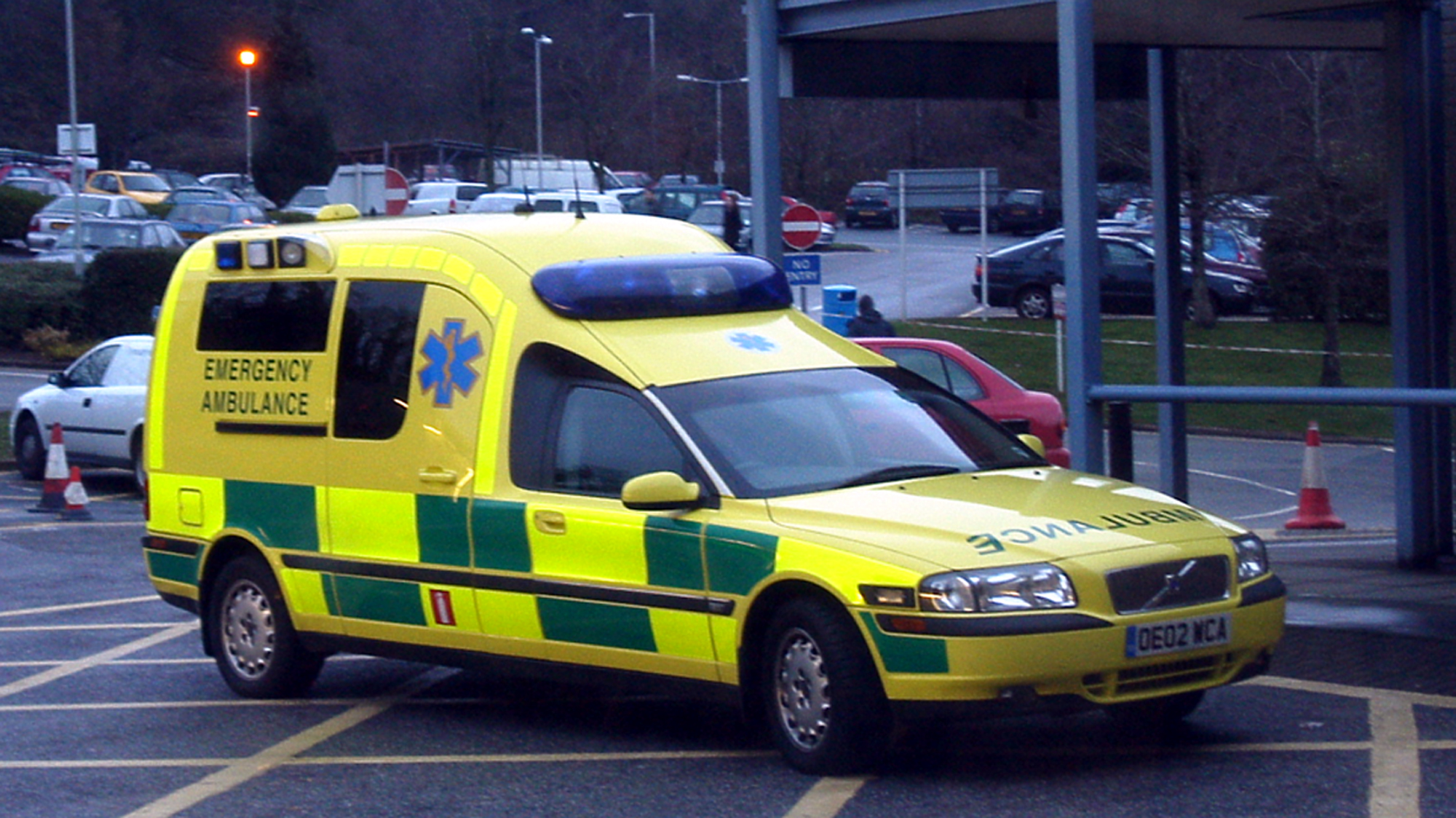
First generation S80 ambulance, RHD model (UK)

Armored versions were also available. The first generation could be ordered from the factory, with the actual armoring done by an outside company. The second generation armoured version was available from Czech specialists SVOS and no factory armoring was offered.

== See also ==
- Volvo ECC
