= Noble Automotive =

English automotive company

Noble Automotive Limited
- Type: Private
- Industry: Automotive
- Founded: 1999 in Leeds
- Founder: Lee Noble
- Headquarters: Leicester, England
- Key people: Peter Boutwood – MD
- Products: Sports cars
- Owner: Bowei Liu
- Number of employees: 8
- Website: www.noblecars.com

Noble Automotive Limited, more commonly known simply as Noble, is an English sports car manufacturer based in Leicester. It was established in 1999 by Lee Noble in Leeds, West Yorkshire, for producing high-speed sports cars with a rear mid-engine, rear-wheel drive layout. Lee Noble was the chief designer and part owner of Noble. The company was sold in August 2006. He left the company in February 2008 and shortly after announced his new venture, Fenix Automotive in 2009.

Noble is a low-production English sports car company, its past products include the M12 GTO, M12 GTO-3, M12 GTO-3R and Noble M400. The M12 GTO-3R and M400 share chassis and body, but have minor differences in engines and suspensions. The M15 has a new space frame chassis. The body and chassis of the Noble is built by Hi-Tech Automotive in Port Elizabeth, South Africa alongside Superformance cars. Once the body shell is completed, it is sent to the Noble factory where the engines, transmissions, etc. are added.

In 2009, Noble released the M600 with 650 bhp (485 kW) available from its 4.4-litre V8 Volvo derived twin turbocharged engine with a Graziano 6 speed manual gearbox.

Only 220 Noble GTO-3Rs and M400s were exported to the US. They are the only Nobles available to the American market. The US distribution rights to the M12s and M400s were sold in February 2007 to 1G Racing from Ohio. Due to high demand of these cars, 1G released its own copy, named Rossion Q1.

== Noble M10 (1999–2000) ==
The Noble M10 is a two-door, two seater model built in convertible form only. It is powered by a naturally aspirated (i.e., no turbo charger) 2.5-litre engine. It was introduced in 1999, but is no longer in production, having been replaced by the M12. Only a few were ever made, as customers moved deposits onto the M12 as soon as its credentials were announced.

== Noble M12 (2000–2008) ==
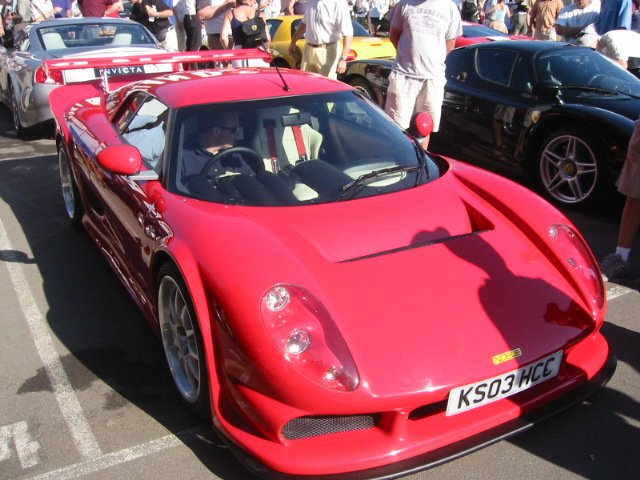
Noble M12 GTO-3R at the 2003 Goodwood Festival of Speed

Like the Noble M10, the Noble M12 is a two-door, two-seater model, originally planned both as a coupe and as a convertible. All M12s have been powered by specially tuned turbocharged Ford Duratec V6 engines.

The M12 has a full steel roll cage, steel frame, and fibre glass composite clam shell body parts. These cars are extremely lightweight and stiff. Although track derived, the M12 performs well on both road and track. The coupe evolved through four variants, with the M400 being the ultimate version of the M12, followed by the GTO-3R.

- Noble M12 GTO – 2.5L bi-turbo 310 bhp (231 kW)
- Noble M12 GTO-3 – 3.0L bi-turbo 352 bhp (262 kW)
- Noble M12 GTO-3R – 3.0L bi-turbo 352 bhp (262 kW)

0–60 mph (0–97 km/h) in 3.7 seconds was published in the official brochure of the M12 GTO-3R, Road and Track indicated a 0–60 mph performance of 3.3 seconds, but subsequently listed it as 3.5 seconds. Its top speed is listed as 170 mph. Lateral Gs are reported in excess of 1.2.

== Noble M400 (2004–2007) ==
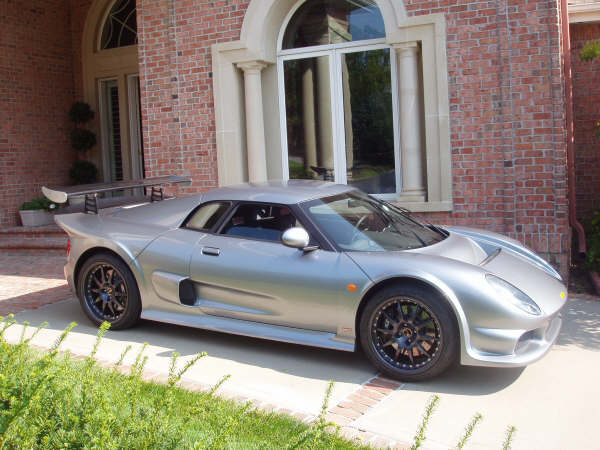
Noble M400

The M400 is the track variant of the M12. Its power-to-weight ratio is over 400 bhp (300 kW) per ton, and is the figure from which its model name derives. It has 425 bhp (317 kW; 431 PS) and has been reported to do 0–60 mph (0–97 km/h) in as little as 2.97 seconds. Car and Driver (March 2007) achieved a 0–60 mph time of 3.3 seconds and a 0–100 mph time of 7.52 seconds. Although often listed as 0-60 mph in 3.5 seconds, the M400 generally comes in at 3.2 seconds according to various publications and generally listed amongst the fastest accelerating cars. Noble indicates only that the car is capable of achieving 0–60 mph in under 4 seconds. Its top speed is listed as 185 mph (300 km/h). A top speed of 202 mph (325 km/h) has been achieved by Noble's former press officer. Lateral Gs are reported in excess of 1.2. It has both a 3-point seatbelt and a 5-point harness.

The most notable differences from the M12 are the use of forged pistons, Universal Turbos Ltd Supplied Garrett T28 turbos, a front anti-roll bar, stiffer springs, different shocks, Pirelli P Zero tyres, a smoother gear shifter, and a slightly narrower central tunnel as the driver now sits a bit more central than previous models. Exterior differences remain subtle. The colour scheme tends to incorporate anthracite (Gris) wheels, rear wing supports and wing ends but some examples maintain silver wheels and supports. The front splitter is now removed (Although many owners opt to have this put on). The main change is the addition of side pods to enhance air into the system and to create a visual impact. Air conditioning is now an £1,995 option and adds to the weight. The interior has an added oil gauge that resides next to the boost one. Additionally the Sparco Alcantara seats and finishings differ to the other Noble's (Alcantara is one third the weight of leather). The Noble M400 won the car of the year award in 2005 for one publication. The M400 is designed to be an outstanding track car that is also pleasant to drive on the road. With just 75 examples made (UK/Europe) this version is sought after and rare.

== Noble M14 ==
Noble M14

The Noble M14 debuted at the 2004 British International Motor Show and generated significant interest in the motoring press. It was planned to compete with the Porsche 911 Turbo and Ferrari F430. It was based on the chassis of the M12, with only minor modifications. It had a new body and a more up market interior. Following the debut of the car Lee Noble decided that the car was insufficiently different from the M12/M400 to justify the price increase despite having taken a number of deposits. Noble instead developed a brand new car, the M15, developing further from the M12 and M14, although the cars have few common components.

== Noble M15 (2006–2011) ==
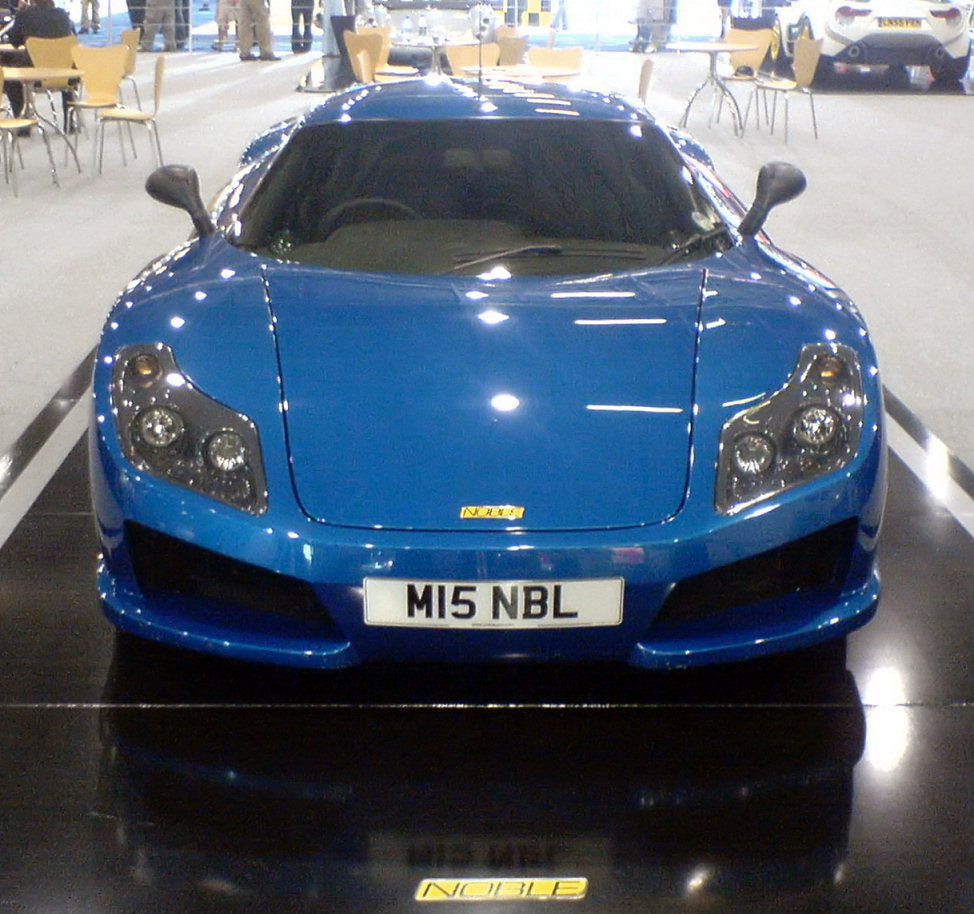
Noble M15

Production of the M15 was planned to begin in early 2006, but has not taken place. The Noble M15 was intended to appeal to a far broader market and compete directly with the Porsche 911 Turbo and Ferrari F430. As a result, the Noble M15 was expected to have a number of features not previously found on Nobles such as satnav, traction control, electric windows and ABS. The company issued a press release about the M15, stating that the M15 will be produced after the introduction of the M600. The M15 of the future will be different than the car shown in 2006.

Despite increased comfort and usability compared to previous Noble cars press releases stated that Noble expected the M15 to be significantly quicker than the M400 around a race track. It is able to accelerate from 0–60 mph (0–97 km/h) in 3.3 seconds and has a top speed of 185 mph (298 km/h).

The car was based on a brand new platform with a longitudinally mounted engine connected to a bespoke gearbox created by Graziano. The double wishbone suspension is a development of the system mounted on the M400. Mounting the engine longitudinally allowed the designer to increase cooling flow to the engine which allows the 3.0L twin turbo V6 to produce 455 bhp (339 kW; 461 PS). The engine was designed to meet emissions regulations and the new steel/aluminium space frame was designed with a view to passing crash test regulations around the world. The M15 was planned to be the first Noble to gain European and US Type Approval.

According to founder Lee Noble, "I wanted to produce a supercar people could use every day. It was time for Noble to take a big step up in terms of refinement, practicality and style."

The M15 appeared in Top Gear and presenter Richard Hammond was very impressed. It was a lot quicker around the Top Gear track than the old Noble. According to Richard this has to do with the new, stronger gearbox which enables Noble to allow more boost and let the same engine produce more power. The Stig managed a lap time of 1:22.5 which is currently 50th on the power lap board.

== Noble M600 (2010–2018) ==
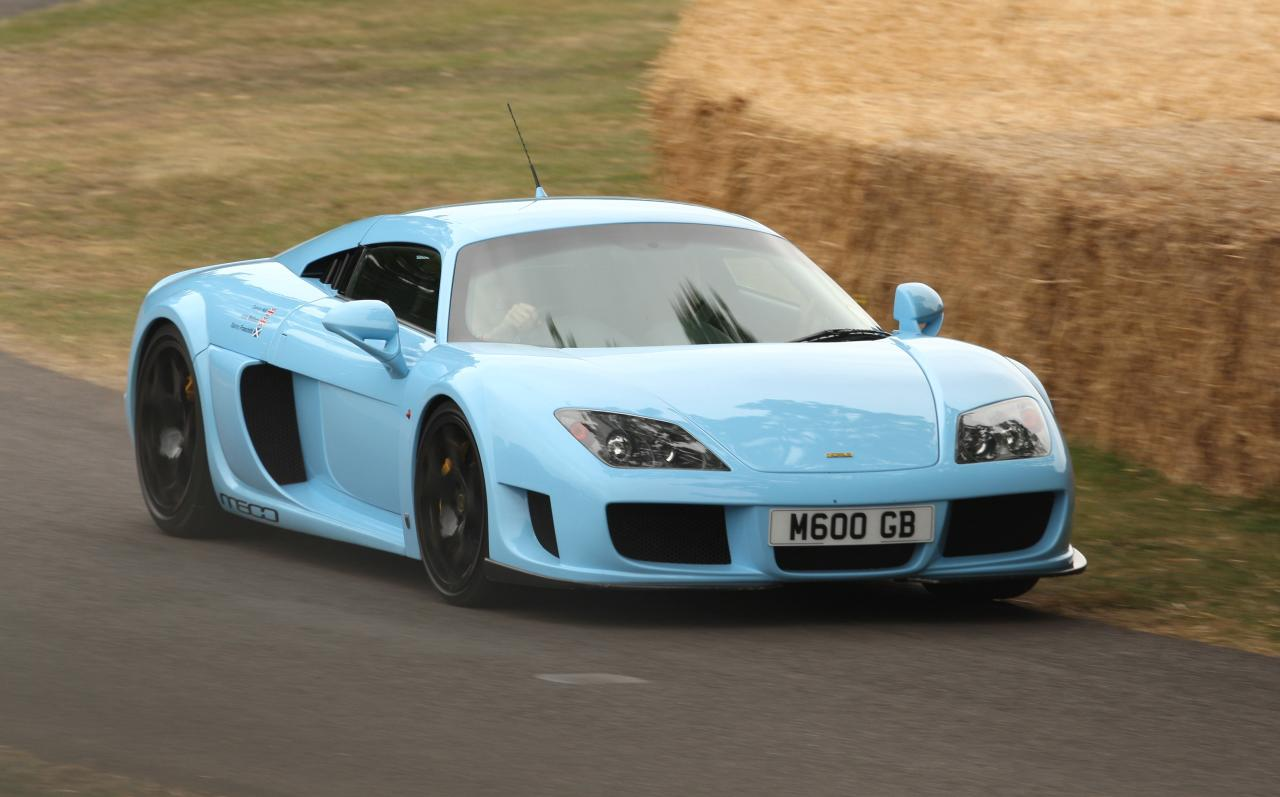
Noble M600

In 2010, Noble began sales production of the M600. It has a Volvo twin-turbocharged V8 engine (producing 650 bhp, 485 kW, 659 PS), a carbon fibre body shell, and a 6-speed Graziano gear box. It competes in the same category as the Ferrari F430. The 2,800 pounds (1,300 kg) M600 can accelerate from 0–62 mph (100 km/h) in 3.5 seconds and requires only another 4 seconds to achieve 100 miles per hour (160 km/h). It has over 1G of grip on the skid pad. The brake discs in the Noble M600 are steel. The Noble comes with no ABS or ASM. It does have TCS as standard, although this can be totally disabled via a fighter jet style missile switch. The Noble M600 has a high reputation as a pure driver's car.

Noble publicly tested an M600 prototype 2 in the US, comparing its performance with a Porsche Carrera GT and Ferrari Enzo. This prototype was detuned to 500 bhp (373 kW; 507 PS).

According to UK enthusiast website ATFULLCHAT Noble Automotive have not ignored the possibility of building an M600 roadster. On 21 June 2012 the website published a rendering of an M600 drophead that was commissioned internally by Noble Automotive, although company MD Peter Boutwood is quoted as stating there are no plans at present to produce such a machine. However, in 2016 Matt Prior of Autocar tested the cabriolet version now called the M600 Speedster. Giving it 4 stars even though it was still in the development stages. Evo also reviewed the Speedster claiming "Whereas the Lamborghini Huracán and Aventador feels compromised by having its roof sliced away, the Speedster is close to undamaged".

Initial projected production would be limited to fifty cars and at least thirty were produced. M600 production stopped in 2018.

== Noble M500 (2022–present) ==
In 2018 the Noble M500 was unveiled by with sales starting in late 2022. The body work is made of carbon fibre and is more lightweight than most super cars.

== See also ==
- List of car manufacturers of the United Kingdom
