= Noble M12 =

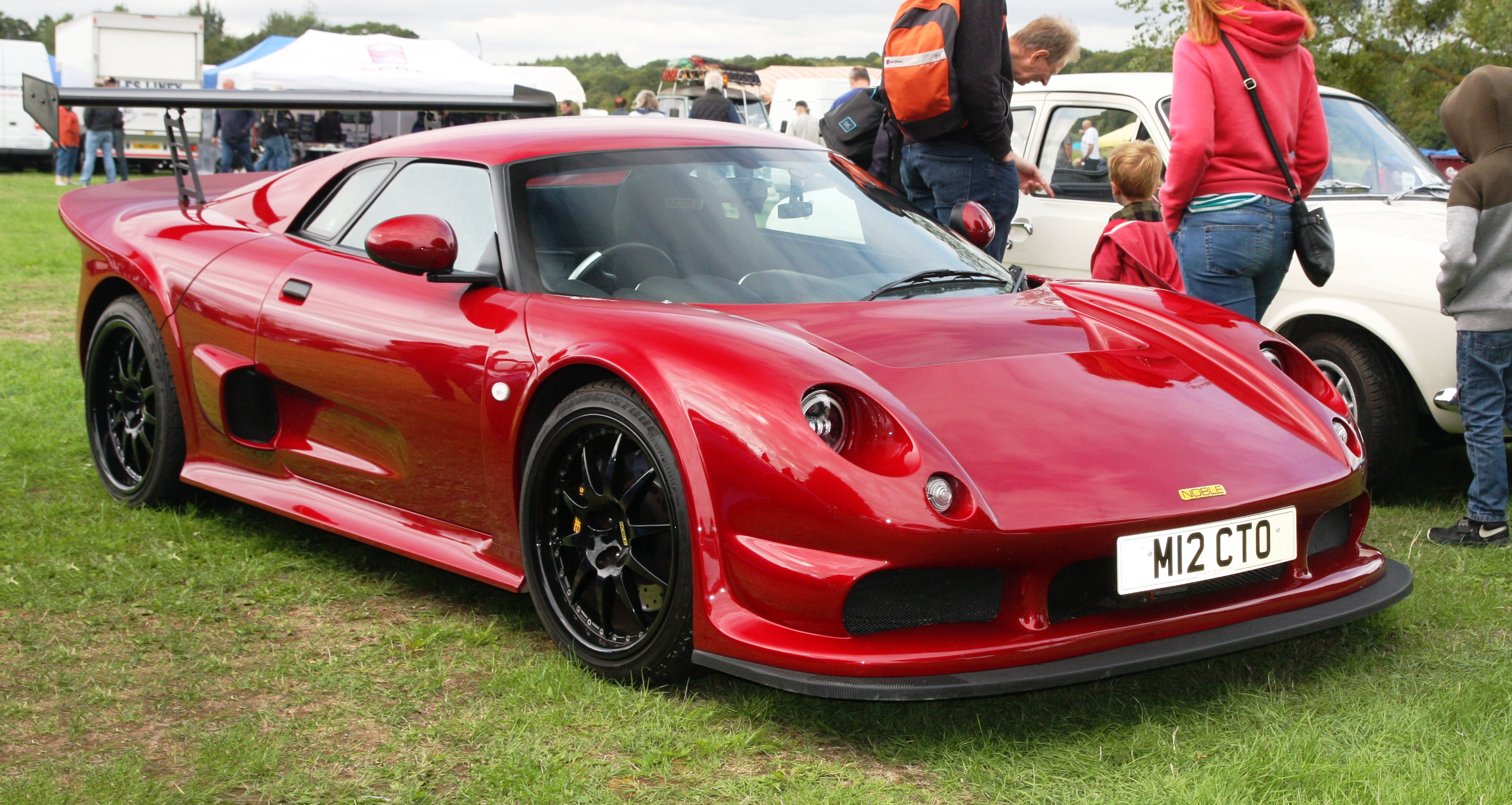

Overview
- Manufacturer: Hi-Tech Automotive under license from Noble Automotive
- Production: 2000–2008
- Assembly: South Africa: Port Elizabeth
- Designer: Lee Noble

Body and chassis
- Class: Sports car (S)
- Body style: 2-door coupé
- Layout: Transverse, rear mid-engine, rear-wheel-drive
- Related: Noble M400; Salica GT; Rossion Q1

Powertrain
- Engine: 2.5 L–3.0 L Ford Duratec 25 Twin-Turbocharged V6
- Transmission: 6-speed Getrag manual

Dimensions
- Wheelbase: 2,438 mm (96.0 in)
- Length: 4,089 mm (161.0 in)
- Width: 1,828 mm (72.0 in)
- Height: 1,143 mm (45.0 in)
- Curb weight: 1,080 kg (2,381 lb) (M12 GTO-3R)

Chronology
- Predecessor: Noble M10
- Successor: Noble M14

The Noble M12 is a two-door, two-seat sports car designed and engineered by English automobile manufacturer Noble Automotive with production outsourced to Hi-Tech Automotive of South Africa.

== Variants ==
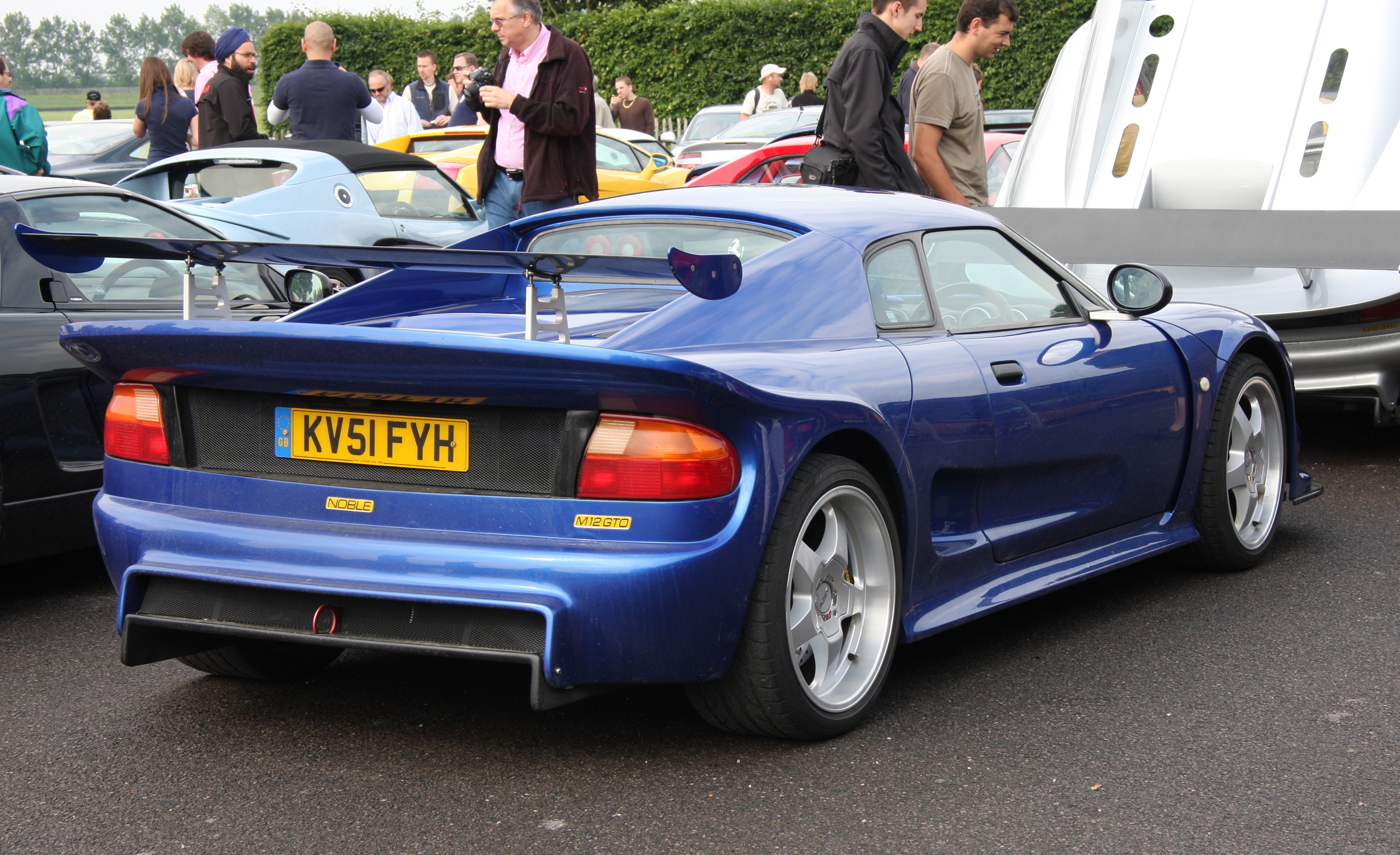
Rear view

The car evolved through many variations, culminating with the M400. Only 220 Noble GTO-3Rs and M400s were imported to the U.S.; they are the only Nobles to have been officially available in the American market. The U.S. production rights to the M12s and M400s were sold in February 2007 to 1G Racing from Ohio. Due to the high demand for these cars, 1G Racing (now Rossion Automotive) released its improved variation based on the M400, Rossion Q1. Salica Cars planned to build variants based on the Noble M12 but they appear to have remained a project.

Like the Noble M10, the Noble M12 is a two-door, two-seat model, originally planned both as a coupé and as a convertible but the production cars were only produced in the coupé bodystyle. All cars have been powered by modified bi-turbocharged Ford Duratec V6 engines. The M12 has a full steel roll cage, steel frame, and G.R.P. (fiberglass) composite clam shell body parts. Although looking to be track derived, the M12 is a street-legal vehicle, ready for both road and track.

Engine specifications
Car	Displacement	Power	Torque
Twin-turbocharged Ford Duratec V6 engine
Noble M12 GTO	2,544 cc (2.5 L; 155.2 cu in)	310 hp (314 PS; 231 kW) at 6,000 rpm	320 lb⋅ft (434 N⋅m) at 3,500 rpm
Noble M12 GTO-3	2,967 cc (3.0 L; 181.1 cu in)	352 hp (357 PS; 262 kW) at 6,200 rpm	350 lb⋅ft (475 N⋅m) at 3,500 - 5,000 rpm
Noble M12 GTO-3R	2,967 cc (3.0 L; 181.1 cu in)	352 hp (357 PS; 262 kW) at 6,200 rpm	350 lb⋅ft (475 N⋅m) at 3,500 - 5,000 rpm
Noble M400	2,967 cc (3.0 L; 181.1 cu in)	425 hp (431 PS; 317 kW) at 6,500 rpm	390 lb⋅ft (529 N⋅m) at 5,000 rpm
Rossion Q1	2,967 cc (3.0 L; 181.1 cu in)	450 bhp (456 PS; 336 kW) at 5,800 rpm	390 lb⋅ft (529 N⋅m) at 4,400 rpm

The Noble M12 GTO-3R is equipped with Garrett T25 twin-turbochargers. Weight is 2,381 lb (1,080 kg). Acceleration from 0-60 mph (97 km/h) in 3.7 seconds was published in the official brochure of the M12 GTO-3R, Road & Track indicated a 0-60 mph (97 km/h) performance of 3.3 seconds, but subsequently listed it as 3.5 seconds. Top speed is listed as 185 mph (298 km/h) and lateral Gs are reported in excess of 1.2.

The Noble M400 is equipped with higher-flow, Garrett T28 twin-turbochargers. Weight is 2,337 lb (1,060 kg).

The Rossion Q1 has a weight of 2,300 lb (1,043 kg) and can accelerate from 0-60 mph (97 km/h) in 3.4 seconds (company spec).

== In popular media ==
The M12 was reviewed briefly in the show Top Gear for Season 1 Episode 2, and can be driven in the Forza video game franchise.
