= Ward's 10 Best Engines =

Annual list

Wards 10 Best Engines is an annual list of the ten "best" automobile engines available in the U.S. market, that are selected by Wards AutoWorld magazine. The list was started in 1994 for model year 1995, and has been drawn every year since then, published at the end of the preceding year.

Engines must be available in regular-production vehicles on sale in the U.S. market no later than the first quarter of the year. Eligibility has also been based on availability in a vehicle below a base price limit, which increased progressively from US$50,000 for the 1995 list up to US$65,000 for the 2020 list; this limit was eliminated for future competitions following the announcement of the 2020 winners. During a 2-month testing period, Wards editors evaluate each engine according to a number of objective and subjective criteria in everyday driving situations – there is no instrumented testing. The selection takes into account power and torque output; noise, vibration, and harshness (NVH) levels; technical relevance; and basic comparative numbers. Each engine competes against all others.

For the 2020 competition, the name was changed to Wards 10 Best Engines and Propulsion Systems.

== Results ==
Engine was also listed at least once in the International Engine of the Year awards

Wards 10 Best Engines and Propulsion Systems (in alphabetic order)
Automaker	Displacement/battery capacity	Powertrain configuration	Powertrain detail	Credited automobile
2024
BMW	3.0 L & 29.5 kWh	Inline-six PHEV	3.0L B58 I6-T & 145 kW electric motor	BMW X5 xDrive50e
Chevrolet	6.2 L	V8 HEV	6.2L LT2 OHV V8 & 120 kW electric motor	Chevrolet Corvette E-Ray
Ford	3.5 L	V6 HEV	3.5L Ecoboost D35 V6-TT dual injection & 33 kW electric motor	Ford F-150 Powerboost
Honda	2.0 L	Inline-four HEV	2.0L LFC-H4 I4 GDI & 135 kW electric motor	Honda Civic Hybrid
Hyundai	77.4 kWh	Electric motor	175/303 kW (front/rear) permanent-magnet synchronous motors	Hyundai Ioniq 5 N
Kia	99.8 kWh	Electric motor	Dual 215 kW AC motors	Kia EV9 GT-Line
Porsche	3.0 L & 14.1 kWh	V6 PHEV	3.0L EA839 V6-T & 130 kW electric motor	Porsche Cayenne E-Hybrid
Ram	3.0 L	Inline-six engine	3.0L Hurricane GME-T6 I6-TT	Ram 1500 Tungsten
Toyota	2.5 L	Inline-four HEV	2.5L Dynamic Force A25A-FXS I4 & 100/40 kW (front/rear) AC motors	Toyota Camry XSE AWD
Toyota	1.6 L	Inline-three engine	1.6L G16E-GTS I3-T D-4S	Toyota Corolla GR
2023
BMW	3.0 L	Inline-six engine	3.0L S58 I6-TT	BMW M2
Chevrolet	5.5 L	V8 engine	5.5L LT6 flat-plane V8 DOHC	Chevrolet Corvette Z06
Dodge	1.3 L & 15.5 kWh	Inline-four PHEV	1.3L T4 I4-T & 33/90 kW (front/rear) electric motors	Dodge Hornet R/T
Ford	5.0 L	V8 engine	5.0L Coyote V8 dual injection DOHC	Ford Mustang Dark Horse
Honda	2.0 L	Inline-four HEV	2.0L LFC5 I4 & 135 kW electric motor	Honda Accord Hybrid
Hyundai	77.4 kWh	Electric motor	EM07/EM17 permanent-magnet synchronous motors	Hyundai Ioniq 6
Lucid	93 kWh	Electric motor	462 kW (620 hp) permanent-magnet synchronous motors	Lucid Air Touring
Mercedes-Benz	2.0 L	Inline-four MHEV	2.0L M139 I4-T eTurbo & 48V electric motor	Mercedes-Benz AMG C43
Nissan	91.0 kWh	Electric motor	290 kW (389 hp) combined-output 8-pole current-excited synchronous AC motors	Nissan Ariya e-4ORCE
Toyota	2.0 L & 13.6 kWh	Inline-four PHEV	2.0L Dynamic Force M20A-FXS I4 & 120kW electric motor	Toyota Prius Prime
2022
Acura	1.5 L	Inline-four engine	1.5L L15CA DOHC I4-T GDI	Acura Integra A-spec (DE)
Ford	131.0 kWh	Electric motor	433 kW (581 hp) combined-output dual permanent-magnet motors	Ford F-150 Lightning Extended Range
General Motors	247 kWh	Electric motor	746 kW (1,000 hp) combined-output Ultium Drive triple permanent-magnet motors	GMC Hummer EV Edition 1
Hyundai	77.4 kWh	Electric motor	EM07/EM17 (front/rear) dual permanent-magnet synchronous motors	Hyundai Ioniq 5
Lucid	112 kWh	Electric motor	611 kW (819 hp) combined-output dual electric motors	Lucid Air Grand Touring
Mercedes-AMG	120.0 kWh	Electric motor	484–560 kW (649–751 hp) combined-output dual permanent-magnet synchronous AC motors	Mercedes-Benz EQS 53 AMG 4MATIC+
Nissan	1.5 L	Inline-three engine	1.5 L KR15DDT I3-T GDI, variable compression	Nissan Rogue
Jeep (Stellantis)	2.0 L & 17.3 kWh	Inline-four PHEV	2.0L GME I4-T GDI & 100/33 kW (front/rear) permanent magnet AC electric motors	Jeep Grand Cherokee 4×E
Jeep (Stellantis)	3.0 L	Inline-six engine	3.0L Hurricane I6-TT GDI	Jeep Grand Wagoneer
Toyota	3.5 L	V6 HEV	"Dynamic Force" V35A-FTS V6-TT GDI & 36 kW AC motor	Toyota Tundra i-FORCE MAX
2021
BMW	2.0 L & 12 kWh	Inline-four PHEV	2.0 L B48 I4-T & 80 kW electric motor	BMW 330e
General Motors	1.3 L	Inline-three engine	1.3 L L3T I3-T	Chevrolet Trailblazer
Ford	3.5 L	V6 HEV	3.5 L EcoBoost D35 V6-TT & 35 kW electric motor	Ford F-150 Hybrid
Ford	91.0 kWh	Electric motor	50/210 kW (front/rear) dual permanent-magnet synchronous motors	Ford Mustang Mach-E First Edition
Hyundai	64.0 kWh	Electric motor	150 kW permanent-magnet synchronous motor	Hyundai Kona
Hyundai	2.5 L	Inline-four engine	2.5 L Smartstream G2.5 I4-T GDI	Hyundai Santa Fe
Jeep	2.0 L & 17.4 kWh	Inline-four PHEV	2.0 L Hurricane I4-T & 100/33 kW (front/rear) electric motors	Jeep Wrangler 4xE
Polestar	78.0 kWh	Electric motor	Dual 150 kW permanent-magnet synchronous AC motors	Polestar 2 Launch Edition
Porsche	93.4 kWh	Electric motor	390/420 kW (front/rear) dual permanent magnet synchronous AC motors	Porsche Taycan 4S Plus
Toyota	Hydrogen fuel cell	Electric motor	136 kW 4JM fuel cell-powered electric motor	Toyota Mirai
2020
BMW	3.0 L	Inline-six engine	3.0L B58 I6-T	BMW M340i
Chrysler	3.6 L	V6 MHEV	3.6L Pentastar V6 & 12 kW electric motor	Ram 1500
Daimler	3.0 L	Inline-six MHEV	3.0L M256 I6-T electric supercharger & 48V electric motor	Mercedes-Benz GLE450
Ford	2.3 L	Inline-four engine	2.3L Ecoboost I4-T	Ford Mustang EcoBoost HPP
General Motors	3.0 L	Inline-six engine	3.0L Duramax LM2 I6-T diesel	GMC Sierra
General Motors	6.2 L	V8 engine	6.2L LT2 V8 GDI OHV cylinder deactivation	Chevrolet Corvette Stingray
Honda	2.0 L	Inline-four HEV	2.0L LFA Atkinson cycle I4 & 135 kW electric motor	Honda Accord Hybrid
Hyundai	64.0 kWh	Electric motor	150 kW permanent-magnet motor	Hyundai Kona
Hyundai	1.6 L	Inline-four engine	1.6L Smartstream G4FP I4-T CVVD	Hyundai Sonata
Nissan	2.0 L	Inline-four engine	2.0L KR20DDET I4-T dual injection variable compression	Nissan Altima
2019
BMW	3.0 L	Inline-six engine	3.0L B58 I6-T	BMW X5
Chrysler	3.6 L	V6 MHEV	3.6L Pentastar V6 & 12 kW electric motor	Ram 1500
Ford	5.0 L	V8 engine	5.0L Coyote V8 DOHC MPFI	Ford Mustang GT/Bullitt
Ford	3.0 L	V6 engine	3.0L Power Stroke V6-T DOHC diesel	Ford F-150
General Motors	6.2 L	V8 engine	6.2L L87 V8 GDI OHV cylinder deactivation	Chevrolet Silverado
Honda	2.0 L	Inline-four HEV	2.0L LFA1 I4 & electric motor	Honda Accord Hybrid
Hyundai	Hydrogen fuel cell	Electric motor	120 kW permanent-magnet motor	Hyundai Nexo
Hyundai	64.0 kWh	Electric motor	150 kW permanent-magnet motor	Hyundai Kona
Nissan	2.0 L	Inline-four engine	2.0L I4-T Variable Compression	Infiniti QX50
Toyota	2.0 L	Inline-four HEV	2.0L Dynamic Force M20A-FXS I4 dual injection & electric motor	Lexus UX250h
2018
Chevrolet	60.0 kWh	Electric motor	150 kW permanent-magnet motor	Chevrolet Bolt EV
Chrysler	3.6 L & 16 kWh	V6 engine PHEV	3.6L Pentastar Atkinson cycle V6 & dual electric motors	Chrysler Pacifica Plug-In Hybrid
Ford	2.7 L	V6 engine	2.7L EcoBoost V6-TT dual injection	Ford F-150
Ford	5.0 L	V8 engine	5.0L Coyote DOHC MPFI	Ford Mustang GT
Honda	2.0 L	Inline-four engine	2.0L K20C1 I4-T GDI	Honda Civic Type R
Honda	Hydrogen fuel cell	Electric motor	103 kW permanent-magnet motor	Honda Clarity Fuel Cell
Nissan	3.0 L	V6 engine	3.0L VR30DDTT V6-TT	Infiniti Q50
Jaguar	2.0 L	Inline-four engine	2.0L Ingenium AJ200 I4-T	Jaguar XF
Hyundai	3.3 L	V6 engine	3.3L Lambda II G6DP V6-TT GDI	Kia Stinger
Toyota	2.5 L	Inline-four HEV	2.5L Dynamic Force A25A-FXS I4 dual injection & electric motor	Toyota Camry Hybrid
2017
BMW	3.0 L	Inline-six engine	3.0L B58 I6-T	BMW M240i
General Motors	1.5 L & 18.4 kWh	Inline-four PHEV	1.5L Voltec L3A I4 & 48+87 kW electric motors	Chevrolet Volt
Chrysler	3.6 L & 16 kWh	V6 PHEV	3.6L Pentastar Atkinson cycle V6 & dual electric motors	Chrysler Pacifica Plug-In Hybrid
Ford	2.3 L	Inline-four engine	2.3L Ecoboost I4-T	Ford Focus RS
Honda	2.0 L & 6.7 kWh	Inline-four PHEV	2.0L Earth Dreams K24W I4 & 120 kW electric motor	Honda Accord Plug-In Hybrid
Hyundai	1.4 L	Inline-four engine	1.4L Kappa G4LD I4-T GDI	Hyundai Elantra Eco
Nissan	3.0 L	V6 engine	3.0L VR30DDTT V6-TT	Infiniti Q60
Mazda	2.5 L	Inline-four engine	2.5L Skyactiv PY-VPTS I4-T GDI	Mazda CX-9
Mercedes-Benz	2.0 L	Inline-four engine	2.0L M274 I4-T	Mercedes C300
Volvo	2.0 L	Inline-four engine	2.0L Drive-E VEP4 B4204T43 I4-TSC GDI Twincharged	Volvo V60 Polestar
2016
BMW	3.0 L	Inline-six engine	3.0L B58 I6-T	BMW 340i
Chrysler	3.0 L	V6 engine	3.0L VM Motori L630 V6-T diesel	Ram 1500 EcoDiesel
Ford	5.2 L	V8 engine	5.2L Voodoo Modular engine V8 DOHC MPFI	Shelby GT350
General Motors	3.6 L	V6 engine	3.6L High Feature LGX V6 cylinder deactivation	Chevrolet Camaro, Cadillac ATS
General Motors	1.5 L & 18.4 kWh	Inline-four PHEV	1.5L Voltec L3A I4 & 48+87 kW electric motors	Chevrolet Volt
Hyundai	2.0 L & 9.8 kWh	Inline-four PHEV	2.0L Nu G4NG I4 GDI & 38 kW electric motor	Hyundai Sonata Plug-In Hybrid
Nissan	3.5 L	V6 engine	3.5L VQ35DE V6 MPFI	Nissan Maxima
Subaru	2.0 L	Boxer-four engine	2.0L FA20F B4-T GDI	Subaru WRX
Toyota	1.8 L	Inline-four HEV	1.8L 2ZR-FXE Atkinson cycle I4 MPFI & 53 kW electric motor	Toyota Prius
Volvo	2.0 L	Inline-four engine	2.0L Drive-E VEP4 B4204T27 I4-TSC GDI Twincharged	Volvo XC90 T6
2015
BMW	22 kWh	Synchronous motor	127 kW (170 BHP, 172 PS) synchronous electric motor	BMW i3
BMW	1.5 L	Inline-three engine	1.5L B38 DOHC I3-T GDI	Mini Cooper
Chrysler	6.2 L (378.35 in³)	V8 engine	6.2L Hellcat V8-SC OHV Supercharged	Dodge Challenger SRT Hellcat
Chrysler	3.0 L	V6 engine	3.0L VM Motori L630 V6-T diesel	Ram 1500 EcoDiesel
Ford	1.0 L	Inline-three engine	1.0L EcoBoost !3-T DOHC VVT	Ford Fiesta
General Motors	6.2 L (378 in³)	V8 engine	6.2L LT1 (Generation V) V8 OHV GDI	Chevrolet Corvette Stingray
Hyundai Motor	Hydrogen fuel cell	Synchronous motor	100 kW (134 hp) synchronous motor	Hyundai Tucson FCV
Subaru (Fuji Heavy Industries)	2.0 L	Boxer-four engine	2.0L FA20F B4-T GDI	Subaru WRX
Volkswagen	1.8 L	Inline-four engine	EA888 DOHC I4-T GDI VVL	Volkswagen Golf
Volvo	2.0 L	Inline-four engine	2.0L Drive-E B4204T7 VEP4 I4-T GDI	Volvo S60 T5 FWD Drive-E
2014
Audi (Volkswagen Group)	3.0 L	V6 engine	V6 DOHC Supercharged Fuel Stratified Injection	Audi S5
BMW	3.0 L	Inline-six engine	N57 DOHC Turbocharged diesel	BMW 535d
Chrysler	3.0 L	V6 engine	VM Motori L630 DOHC Turbocharged diesel	Ram 1500 EcoDiesel
Fiat	24 kWh	Synchronous motor	83 kW (111 hp) synchronous motor	Fiat 500e
Ford	1.0 L	Inline-three engine	1.0L EcoBoost DOHC Ti-VCT Turbocharged	Ford Fiesta
General Motors	2.0 L	Inline-four engine	Family B LUZ DOHC Turbocharged diesel	Chevrolet Cruze Diesel
General Motors	6.2 L (378 in³)	V8 engine	LT1 (Generation V) OHV gasoline direct injection	Chevrolet Corvette Stingray
Honda	3.5 L	V6 engine	Earth Dreams SOHC VTEC	Honda Accord V6
Porsche (Volkswagen Group)	2.7 L	Flat-six engine	DOHC gasoline direct injection	Porsche Cayman
Volkswagen	1.8 L	Inline-four engine	EA888 DOHC Turbocharged Fuel Stratified Injection Valvelift	Volkswagen Jetta
2013
Audi (Volkswagen Group)	3.0 L	V6 engine	V6 DOHC Supercharged Fuel Stratified Injection	Audi S5
BMW	3.0 L	Inline-six engine	N55 DOHC Turbocharged	BMW 135is
BMW	2.0 L	Inline-four engine	N20 DOHC gasoline direct injection Turbocharged	BMW 328i
Chrysler	3.6 L (219.6 in³)	V6 engine	Pentastar V6 DOHC VVT naturally aspirated	Ram 1500
Ford	2.0 L	Inline-four engine	2.0L EcoBoost DOHC Ti-VCT gasoline direct injection Turbocharged	Ford Focus ST/Ford Taurus
Ford	5.8 L (355 in³)	V8 engine	Trinity DOHC Supercharged	Shelby GT500
General Motors	2.0 L	Inline-four engine	Ecotec LTG DOHC gasoline direct injection Turbocharged	Cadillac ATS
Honda	2.4 L	Inline-four engine	Earth Dreams DOHC i-VTEC gasoline direct injection	Honda Accord Sport
Honda	3.5 L	V6 engine	Earth Dreams SOHC VTEC	Honda Accord V6
Subaru (Fuji Heavy Industries)	2.0 L	Boxer-four engine	FA20D DOHC AVCS D4-S direct and port injection	Subaru BRZ
2012
Audi (Volkswagen Group)	3.0 L	V6 engine	V6 DOHC Supercharged Fuel Stratified Injection	Audi A6
BMW	3.0 L	Inline-six engine	N55 DOHC Turbocharged	BMW 335i coupe
BMW	2.0 L	Inline-four engine	N20 DOHC gasoline direct injection Turbocharged	BMW Z4 sDrive 28i
Chrysler	3.6 L (219.6 in³)	V6 engine	Pentastar V6 DOHC VVT naturally aspirated	Chrysler 300S
Ford	2.0 L	Inline-four engine	2.0L EcoBoost DOHC Ti-VCT gasoline direct injection Turbocharged	Ford Edge
Ford	5.0 L (302 in³)	V8 engine	5.0L Coyote DOHC Ti-VCT	Ford Mustang Boss 302
General Motors	2.0 L	Inline-four engine	Ecotec LHU DOHC gasoline direct injection Turbocharged	Buick Regal GS
Hyundai Motor	1.6 L	Inline-four engine	Gamma GDi DOHC gasoline direct injection	Hyundai Accent
Mazda	2.0 L	Inline-four engine	SkyActiv DOHC gasoline direct injection	Mazda3
Nissan (Renault-Nissan Alliance)	3.5 L	V6 HEV	VQ 3.5L HEV DOHC electric Hybrid	Infiniti M35h
2011
Audi (Volkswagen Group)	3.0 L	V6 engine	V6 DOHC Supercharged Fuel Stratified Injection	Audi S4
BMW	3.0 L	Inline-six engine	N55 DOHC Turbocharged	BMW 335i sedan
BMW	1.6 L	Inline-four engine	Prince DOHC Turbocharged	Mini Cooper S
Chrysler	3.6 L (213.5 in³)	V6 engine	Pentastar V6 DOHC VVT naturally aspirated	Dodge Avenger
Ford	5.0 L (302 in³)	V8 engine	5.0L Coyote DOHC Ti-VCT	Ford Mustang GT
General Motors	1.4 L & 16.0 kWh	Inline-four REEV	TwinPort DOHC electric Hybrid	Chevrolet Volt
Hyundai Motor	5.0 L	V8 engine	Tau GDi CVVT DOHC	Hyundai Genesis 5.0 R-Spec
Nissan (Renault-Nissan Alliance)	24.2 kWh	Synchronous motor	80 kW synchronous motor	Nissan Leaf
Volkswagen	2.0 L	Inline-four engine	TDI CR DOHC Turbocharged diesel (Vacated)	Volkswagen Jetta TDI
Volvo	3.0 L	Inline-six engine	T6 DOHC Turbocharged	Volvo S60 T6
2010
Audi (Volkswagen Group)	2.0 L	Inline-four engine	EA888 DOHC Turbocharged Fuel Stratified Injection Valvelift	Audi A4
Audi (Volkswagen Group)	3.0 L	V6 engine	V6 DOHC Supercharged Fuel Stratified Injection	Audi S4
BMW	3.0 L	Inline-six engine	M57 DOHC Twin-turbocharged diesel	BMW 335d sedan
Ford	2.5 L	Inline-four HEV	Duratec 25 DOHC Hybrid	Ford Fusion Hybrid
Ford	3.5 L	V6 engine	EcoBoost V6 DOHC gasoline direct injection Twin-turbocharged	Ford Taurus SHO
General Motors	2.4 L	Inline-four engine	LAF EcoTec DOHC	Chevrolet Equinox
Hyundai Motor	4.6 L	V8 engine	Tau MPi CVVT DOHC	Hyundai Genesis
Subaru (Fuji Heavy Industries)	2.5 L	Boxer-four engine	EJ255 DOHC Turbocharged	Subaru Legacy GT
Toyota	1.8 L	Inline-four HEV	2ZR-FXE Dual VVT-i DOHC Hybrid Synergy Drive	Toyota Prius
Volkswagen	2.0 L	Inline-four engine	TDI CR DOHC Turbocharged diesel (Vacated)	Volkswagen Jetta TDI SportWagen
2009
Audi (Volkswagen Group)	2.0 L	Inline-four engine	EA888 DOHC Turbocharged Fuel Stratified Injection Valvelift	Audi A4 Avant
BMW	3.0 L	Inline-six engine	N54B30 DOHC Twin-turbocharged	BMW 135i coupe
BMW	3.0 L	Inline-six engine	M57 DOHC Twin-turbocharged diesel	BMW 335d sedan
Chrysler	5.7 L	V8 engine	Hemi OHV	Dodge Ram/Dodge Challenger R/T
Ford	2.5 L	Inline-four HEV	Duratec 25 DOHC Hybrid	Ford Escape Hybrid
General Motors	3.6 L	V6 engine	LLT High-Feature DOHC GDI	Cadillac CTS
Honda	3.5 L	V6 engine	J35 SOHC	Honda Accord Coupe
Hyundai Motor	4.6 L	V8 engine	Tau MPi CVVT DOHC	Hyundai Genesis
Toyota	3.5 L	V6 engine	2GR-FSE DOHC	Lexus IS350
Volkswagen	2.0 L	Inline-four engine	TDI CR DOHC Turbocharged diesel (Vacated)	Volkswagen Jetta TDI
2008
Audi (Volkswagen Group)	2.0 L	Inline-four engine	EA827/EA113 DOHC Turbocharged Fuel Stratified Injection	Audi A3
BMW	3.0 L	Inline-six engine	N54B30 DOHC Twin-turbocharged	BMW 335i coupe
Mercedes-Benz	3.0 L	V6 engine	OM642 Bluetec DOHC Turbodiesel	Mercedes E320 CDI
Ford	4.6 L	V8 engine	Modular 3V SOHC	Ford Mustang Shelby GT/Bullitt
General Motors	3.6 L	V6 engine	High-Feature DOHC GDI	Cadillac CTS
General Motors	6.0 L	V8 HEV	Vortec OHV Hybrid	GMC Yukon Hybrid
Honda	3.5 L	V6 engine	J35 SOHC	Honda Accord Coupe
Mazda	2.3 L	Inline-four engine	MZR DISI DOHC Turbocharged	Mazdaspeed3
Nissan	3.7 L	V6 engine	VQ37VHR DOHC VVL VVT	Infiniti G37
Toyota	3.5 L	V6 engine	2GR-FSE DOHC	Lexus IS350
2007
Audi (Volkswagen Group)	2.0 L	Inline-four engine	EA827/EA113 DOHC Turbocharged Fuel Stratified Injection	Audi A3
BMW	3.0 L	Inline-six engine	N52B30 DOHC	BMW Z4 3.0si
BMW	3.0 L	Inline-six engine	N54B30 DOHC Twin-turbocharged	BMW 335i
Mercedes-Benz	3.0 L	V6 engine	OM642 Bluetec DOHC Turbodiesel	Mercedes E320 CDI
Chrysler	5.7 L	V8 engine	Hemi Magnum OHV	Chrysler 300C
Ford	4.6 L	V8 engine	Modular 3V SOHC	Ford Mustang Shelby GT
Ford	3.5 L	V6 engine	Duratec 35 DOHC	Lincoln MKX
Mazda	2.3 L	Inline-four engine	MZR DISI DOHC Turbocharged	Mazdaspeed3
Nissan	3.5 L	V6 engine	VQ35HR DOHC VVT	Infiniti G35
Toyota	3.5 L	V6 engine	2GR-FSE DOHC	Lexus IS350
2006
Audi (Volkswagen Group)	2.0 L	Inline-four engine	EA827/EA113 DOHC Turbocharged Fuel Stratified Injection	Audi A3
Audi (Volkswagen Group)	4.2 L	V8 engine	079.C 40V BBK DOHC Fuel Stratified Injection	Audi S4
BMW	3.0 L	Inline-six engine	N52B30 DOHC	BMW 330i
Chrysler	5.7 L	V8 engine	Hemi Magnum OHV	Dodge Charger R/T
Ford	4.6 L	V8 engine	Modular 3V SOHC	Ford Mustang GT
General Motors	2 L	Inline-four engine	Ecotec LSJ DOHC Supercharged	Chevrolet Cobalt SS
General Motors	2.8 L	V6 engine	High-Feature DOHC Turbocharged	Saab 9-3 Aero
Mazda	2.3 L	Inline-four engine	MZR DISI DOHC Turbocharged	Mazdaspeed6
Nissan	3.5 L	V6 engine	VQ35DE DOHC VVT	Infiniti G35 (6-spd MT)
Toyota	3.5 L	V6 engine	2GR-FSE DOHC	Lexus IS350
2005
Audi (Volkswagen Group)	3.2 L	V6 engine	Fuel Stratified Injection DOHC	Audi A6 3.2 Quattro
Audi (Volkswagen Group)	4.2 L	V8 engine	079.C 40V BBK DOHC	Audi S4 Avant
Chrysler	5.7 L	V8 engine	Hemi OHV	Chrysler 300C (RWD)
Mercedes-Benz	3.2 L	Inline-six engine	OM648 DOHC Turbodiesel	Mercedes-Benz E320 CDI
Ford	4.6 L	V8 engine	Modular 3V SOHC	Ford Mustang GT
General Motors	4.2 L	Inline-six engine	Atlas LL8 DOHC	Chevrolet TrailBlazer
Honda/Acura	3.5 L	V6 engine	J35 SOHC	Acura RL
Honda	3.0 L	V6 HEV	J30 SOHC IMA Hybrid	Honda Accord Hybrid
Mazda	1.3 L	Wankel engine	Renesis	Mazda RX-8
Nissan	3.5 L	V6 engine	VQ35DE DOHC VVT	Infiniti G35 Coupe (6-spd MT)
2004
Audi (Volkswagen Group)	4.2 L	V8 engine	079.C 40V BBK DOHC	Audi S4
BMW	3.2 L	Inline-six engine	S54 DOHC	BMW M3
Chrysler	5.7 L	V8 engine	Hemi OHV	Dodge Ram 1500
Cummins	5.9 L	Inline-six engine	ISB 600 OHV turbodiesel	Dodge Ram HD
General Motors	4.2 L	Inline-six engine	Atlas LL8 DOHC	GMC Envoy 4WD
Honda	3.0 L	V6 engine	J30 SOHC	Honda Accord Coupe (6-spd MT)
Mazda	1.3 L	Wankel engine	Renesis	Mazda RX-8
Nissan	3.5 L	V6 engine	VQ35DE DOHC VVT	Infiniti G35 Sedan
Subaru (Fuji Heavy Industries)	2.5 L	Boxer-four engine	EJ257 DOHC Turbocharged	Subaru Impreza WRX STi
Toyota	1.5 L	Inline-four HEV	1NZ-FXE DOHC Hybrid Synergy Drive	Toyota Prius
2003
BMW	3.0 L	Inline-six engine	M54 DOHC	BMW 330 Ci
BMW	3.2 L	Inline-six engine	S54 DOHC	BMW M3
Chrysler	5.7 L	V8 engine	Hemi OHV	Dodge Ram HD
Ford	6.0 L	V8 engine	Power Stroke OHV turbodiesel	Ford F-Series HD
General Motors	4.2 L	Inline-six engine	Atlas LL8 DOHC	GMC Envoy 4WD
Honda	2.0 L	Inline-four engine	K20A2 DOHC	Acura RSX Type-S
Honda	3.0 L	V6 engine	J30 SOHC	Honda Accord
BMW MINI	1.6 L	Inline-four engine	Tritec SOHC Supercharged	Mini Cooper S
Nissan	3.5 L	V6 engine	VQ35DE DOHC VVT	Infiniti G35 Coupe
Volkswagen Group	1.8 L	Inline-four engine	EA827/EA113 20valve Turbo DOHC Turbocharged	Volkswagen GTI MK4
2002
BMW	3.0 L	Inline-six engine	M54 DOHC	BMW 330 Ci
BMW	3.2 L	Inline-six engine	S54 DOHC	BMW M3
DaimlerChrysler	5.0 L	V8 engine	M113 E50 SOHC	Mercedes-Benz ML500
Ford	5.4 L	V8 engine	Modular SOHC	Ford F-150 SuperCrew
General Motors	4.2 L	Inline-six engine	Atlas LL8 DOHC	GMC Envoy 4WD
Isuzu (General Motors)	6.6 L	V8 engine	Duramax LB7 OHV turbodiesel	Chevrolet Silverado HD
Honda	2.0 L	Inline-four engine	K20A2 DOHC	Acura RSX Type-S
Nissan	3.5 L	V6 engine	VQ35DE DOHC VVT	Nissan Altima
Porsche	2.7 L	Flat-six engine	M96.22 DOHC	Porsche Boxster
Volkswagen Group	1.8 L	Inline-four engine	EA827/EA113 20valve Turbo DOHC Turbocharged	Volkswagen Jetta
2001
Audi (Volkswagen Group)	1.8 L	Inline-four engine	EA827/EA113 20valve Turbo DOHC Turbocharged	Audi A4
Audi (Volkswagen Group)	2.7 L	V6 engine	'biturbo' DOHC	Audi allroad quattro
BMW	3.0 L	Inline-six engine	M54 DOHC	BMW 530i
DaimlerChrysler	3.2 L	V6 engine	M112 E32 SOHC	Mercedes-Benz C320
Ford	5.4 L	V8 engine	Triton SOHC	Ford F-150 Harley Davidson Edition
Isuzu (General Motors)	6.6 L	V8 engine	Duramax LB7 OHV turbodiesel	GMC Sierra HD
Honda	2.0 L	Inline-four engine	F20C DOHC	Honda S2000
Nissan	3.0 L	V6 engine	VQ30DE DOHC	Nissan Maxima
Porsche	2.7 L	Flat-six engine	M96.22 DOHC	Porsche Boxster
Toyota	1.5 L	Inline-four engine	1NZ-FXE DOHC Toyota Hybrid System	Toyota Prius
2000
Audi (Volkswagen Group)	2.7 L	V6 engine	'biturbo' DOHC	
BMW	3.2 L	Inline-six engine	S52 DOHC	
DaimlerChrysler	3.2 L	V6	M112 E32 SOHC	
Ford/Jaguar	3.9 L	V8 engine	AJ30 DOHC	Lincoln LS
Ford	5.4 L	V8 engine	Triton SOHC	
General Motors	3.5 L	V6 engine	LX5 DOHC	Oldsmobile Intrigue
Honda	2.0 L	Inline-four engine	F20C DOHC	Honda S2000
Nissan	3.0 L	V6 engine	VQ30DE DOHC	
Porsche	3.2 L	Flat-six engine	M96.21 DOHC	Porsche Boxster S
Toyota	4.0 L	V8 engine	1UZ-FE DOHC	
1999
BMW	2.8 L	Inline-six engine	M52 DOHC	
BMW	3.2 L	Inline-six engine	S52 DOHC	
Chrysler	4.7 L	V8 engine	PowerTech SOHC	
Ford	2.5 L	V6 engine	Duratec SVT DOHC	Ford Contour SVT
Ford	5.4 L	V8 engine	Triton SOHC	
General Motors	3.5 L	V6 engine	LX5 DOHC	Oldsmobile Intrigue
General Motors	5.7 L	V8 engine	LS1 OHV	
Mercedes-Benz	3.2 L	V6 engine	M112 E32 SOHC	
Nissan	3.0 L	V6 engine	VQ30DE DOHC	
Toyota	4.0 L	V8 engine	1UZ-FE DOHC	
1998
BMW	2.5 L	Inline-six engine	M52 DOHC	
BMW	3.2 L	Inline-six engine	S52 DOHC	
Ford	2.5 L	V6 engine	Duratec SVT DOHC	Ford Contour SVT
Ford	5.4 L	V8 engine	Triton SOHC	
General Motors	5.7 L	V8 engine	LS1 OHV	
Mazda	2.3 L	V6 engine	KJ-ZEM DOHC Miller cycle Supercharged	Mazda Millenia
Mercedes-Benz	3.2 L	V6 engine	M112 E32 SOHC	
Nissan	3.0 L	V6 engine	VQ30DE DOHC	
Toyota	4.0 L	V8 engine	1UZ-FE DOHC	
Volkswagen Group	1.8 L	Inline-four engine	EA827/EA113 20valve Turbo DOHC Turbocharged	
1997
Audi (Volkswagen Group)	1.8 L	Inline-four engine	EA827/EA113 20valve Turbo DOHC Turbocharged	
BMW	3.2 L	Inline-six engine	S52 DOHC	
BMW	4.4 L	V8 engine	BMW M62 DOHC	
Ford	4.6 L	V8 engine	Modular DOHC	
Ford	5.4 L	V8 engine	Triton SOHC	
General Motors	3.8 L	V6 engine	3800 Series II	
General Motors	4.6 L	V8 engine	Northstar DOHC	
Nissan	3.0 L	V6 engine	VQ30DE DOHC	
Mazda	2.3 L	V6 engine	KJ-ZEM DOHC Miller cycle Supercharged	Mazda Millenia
Volkswagen Group	1.9 L	Inline-four engine	PD TDI	
1996
BMW	4.4 L	V8 engine	M62 DOHC	
BMW	3.2 L	Inline-six engine	S50 DOHC	
Ford	4.6 L	V8 engine	Modular DOHC	
General Motors	3.8 L	V6 engine	3800 Series II	
General Motors	4.6 L	V8 engine	Northstar DOHC	
Honda	2.2 L	Inline-four engine	H22A1 DOHC	Honda Prelude VTEC
Mazda	2.3 L	V6 engine	KJ-ZEM DOHC Miller cycle Supercharged	Mazda Millenia
Nissan	3.0 L	V6 engine	VQ30DE DOHC	
Saab	2.3 L	Inline-four engine	LPT B234 DOHC Turbocharged	Saab 9000
Toyota	3.0 L	V6 engine	1MZ-FE DOHC	Toyota Avalon
1995
BMW	4.0 L	V8 engine	M60 DOHC	
BMW	3.0 L	Inline-six engine	S50 DOHC	
Ford	2.5 L	V6 engine	Duratec 25 DOHC	
General Motors	3.8 L	V6 engine	3800 Series II	
General Motors	4.6 L	V8 engine	Northstar DOHC	
Honda	2.2 L	Inline-four engine	H22A1 DOHC	Honda Prelude VTEC
Mazda	2.3 L	V6 engine	KJ-ZEM DOHC Miller cycle Supercharged	Mazda Millenia
Nissan	3.0 L	V6 engine	VQ30DE DOHC	
Saab	2.3 L	Inline-four engine	LPT B234 DOHC Turbocharged	Saab 9000
Volkswagen	2.8 L	VR6 engine	VR6 12v DOHC	
20th Century
General Motors		V8 engine	Chevrolet small-block engine (first generation)	
General Motors	3.8 L	V6 engine	Buick 3800 V6 engine	
Cadillac	5.1 L	V8 engine	L-Head	
Ford	2.9 L	Inline-four engine	Ford Model T engine	Ford Model T
Ford		V8 engine	Flathead	
Porsche		Flat-six engine	1964—	
BMW		Inline-six engine	1968—	
Volkswagen		Flat-four engine	E-motor 1936–2006	
Honda		Inline-four engine	ED CVCC	
Toyota	4.0 L	V8 engine	UZ DOHC	
Toyota	2.2 L	Inline-four engine	Toyota 5SFE engine	
Automaker	Displacement/battery capacity	Powertrain configuration	Powertrain detail	Credited automobile

== Rankings ==
Number of times the following makes have received the award (excluding the special 20th century awards):

Make	Awards	Last decade/Post GFC (2009 - )	Notes
BMW	41	19	includes Mini
Ford	40	22	
General Motors	39	19	includes Isuzu and Saab post-acquisition
Volkswagen Group	31	12	includes Volkswagen, Audi and post-2009 Porsche
Stellantis	27	20	
Honda	23	12	
Nissan	23	9	includes Infiniti
Toyota	19	10	
Hyundai	18	18	Includes Kia
Daimler (Mercedes-Benz)	12	4	
Mazda	11	2	
Porsche	3	0	Pre-2009 awards counted here prior to VW Group purchase
Volvo	5	5	
Subaru (Fuji Heavy Industries)	5	4	
Lucid	2	2	
Saab	2	0	
Jaguar	1	1	

== See also ==
- List of motor vehicle awards
- International Engine of the Year
- PACE Award
- World Car of the Year
