= Hitech =

Hitech may refer to:

- High tech, an abbreviation of the term "high technology"
- HITECH, acronym for the Health Information Technology for Economic and Clinical Health Act or HITECH Act
- HiTech, a late 1980s computer chess machine
- Hi-Tech Automotive is a low volume car builder and design house located in Port Elizabeth, South Africa
- High Technology High School
- Hitech music, a genre closely related to electronic music and psychedelic trance
- Hitech Grand Prix, a racing team
- Hi-Tec, shoes and sportswear brand
