= Cleveland Engine =

Ford engine factory in Ohio, US

Coordinates: 41.41180°N 81.82199°W

Cleveland Engine is a Ford Motor Company engine manufacturing facility in Brook Park, Ohio, United States, a suburb of Cleveland. It consisted of two distinct plants until one was closed in 2012.

== Plant 1 ==
Opened in 1951, Cleveland Engine Plant number 1 was the site of production for Ford's first overhead valve engine, the Lincoln "Y-block" V8. It also produced many of the "5.0" V8 engines used through the 1980s and 1990s, with the last produced in 2000. The demise of the 5.0 was to also be the end for CEP1, but Ford instead invested $350 million to refurbish it to handle production of the Duratec 30 for the Ford Taurus and Mercury Sable. Ford idled the plant in May 2007.

In 2009, Ford reopened Plant 1 with a $55 million investment in tooling to produce their new 3.5 L EcoBoost V6. The EcoBoost V6 produces 15% lower CO_{2} emissions, and is capable of 20% better fuel economy.

The Cleveland-built EcoBoost V6 engines were available in the 2010 Lincoln MKS, Lincoln MKT, and Ford Flex, and standard on the 2010 Ford Taurus SHO.

Ford made an additional US$1.5 million investment in the plant in 2016 after building over a million EcoBoost engines.

== Plant 2 ==
Cleveland Engine Plant number 2 opened in 1955 to produce the Y-block 292 V8 for the Ford Thunderbird. It was the source of the famed 351 Cleveland V8, and most recently, it was the site for Duratec 25 and 30 production starting in 1994. The plant closed in May 2012, with the last of its output going to 2012 model year Ford Fusions, and its 250 employees transferring to Plant 1. The property was sold in 2021 with plans to redevelop the area into New Huntington Bank Field for the Cleveland Browns.

== See also ==
- List of Ford factories
