= Noble M10 =

Overview
- Manufacturer: Noble Automotive
- Production: 1999–2000
- Assembly: United Kingdom: Leicestershire
- Designer: Lee Noble

Body and chassis
- Class: Sports car
- Body style: 2-door Convertible
- Layout: Mid-engine, RWD

Powertrain
- Engine: 2.5L V6
- Transmission: 5-speed manual

Dimensions
- Wheelbase: 96 in (2,438 mm)
- Length: 152 in (3,861 mm)
- Width: 69 in (1,753 mm)
- Height: 46.3 in (1,176 mm)
- Curb weight: 2,116 lb (960 kg)

Chronology
- Successor: Noble M12

The Noble M10 is the first sports car manufactured by British low volume automobile manufacturer Noble Automotive in Leicestershire.

== Model information ==
=== Background ===
Lee Noble, with assistance from several former Ascari employees who had recently relocated from Leicestershire to Dorset, began developing the M10 sports car in his home garage. Initially, the M10 was offered as a kit car, but its high cost and complex construction proved to be a significant deterrent for potential buyers. Faced with growing financial difficulties, Noble secured an investment from tour operator Tony Moy, an agreement facilitated by former rally driver Roger Clark.

=== Design ===
The M10 was built on a tubular steel frame with a central steel transmission tunnel to enhance torsional rigidity. Its convertible body, the only option available, was made from glass fiber, contributing to its light curb weight of just 995 kg. The interior featured two leather-trimmed seats and a choice of either an aluminum or veneer wood finish. Parts were sourced from various manufacturers, with switchgear coming from Austin (and later Ford), and the windshield from Lotus.

=== Engines ===
Following Tony Moy's investment, the M10's engine was upgraded from the original 1.8-liter Ford Zetec to a more powerful 2.5-liter Ford V6 unit. This was the only power unit ever offered for sale in the M10.

Engine specifications
Engine Name	Car	Displacement	Power	Torque
Ford Zetec	Noble M10 (original design)	1,796 cc (1.8 L; 109.6 cu in)	130 hp (132 PS; 97 kW) at 6,250 rpm	162 lb⋅ft (220 N⋅m) at 4,500 rpm
Ford Duratec	Noble M10 (production)	2,495 cc (2.5 L; 152.3 cu in)	168 hp (170 PS; 125 kW) at 6,000 rpm	162 lb⋅ft (220 N⋅m) at 4,400 rpm

== Vehicles Produced ==
Noble produced a total of five vehicles, one as a demonstrator and the remaining four as customer vehicles. The original prototype A18 NBL sold at auction in the United Kingdom for £31,500 in 2021.

Noble M10
Number	Colour	Registration
1	Blue	A18 NBL
2	Blue	D11 NCM
3	Green	W442RRP
4	Red	S43 RJU
5	Yellow	V6 DGB

== Reception ==
Following Moy's involvement in the M10 project, the M10 was road-tested by Mark Hales for The Telegraph. Autocar also featured the car, with initial drives by Steve Sutcliffe before the magazine sent Steve Cropley to Leicestershire for a full test, which included laps at Bruntingthorpe Proving Ground. The M10 also received positive reviews from Richard Meaden of Evo Magazine and Richard Hammond, who was a presenter for Men and Motors at the time.
