= Hi-Tech Automotive =

Specialist low volume car builder in South Africa

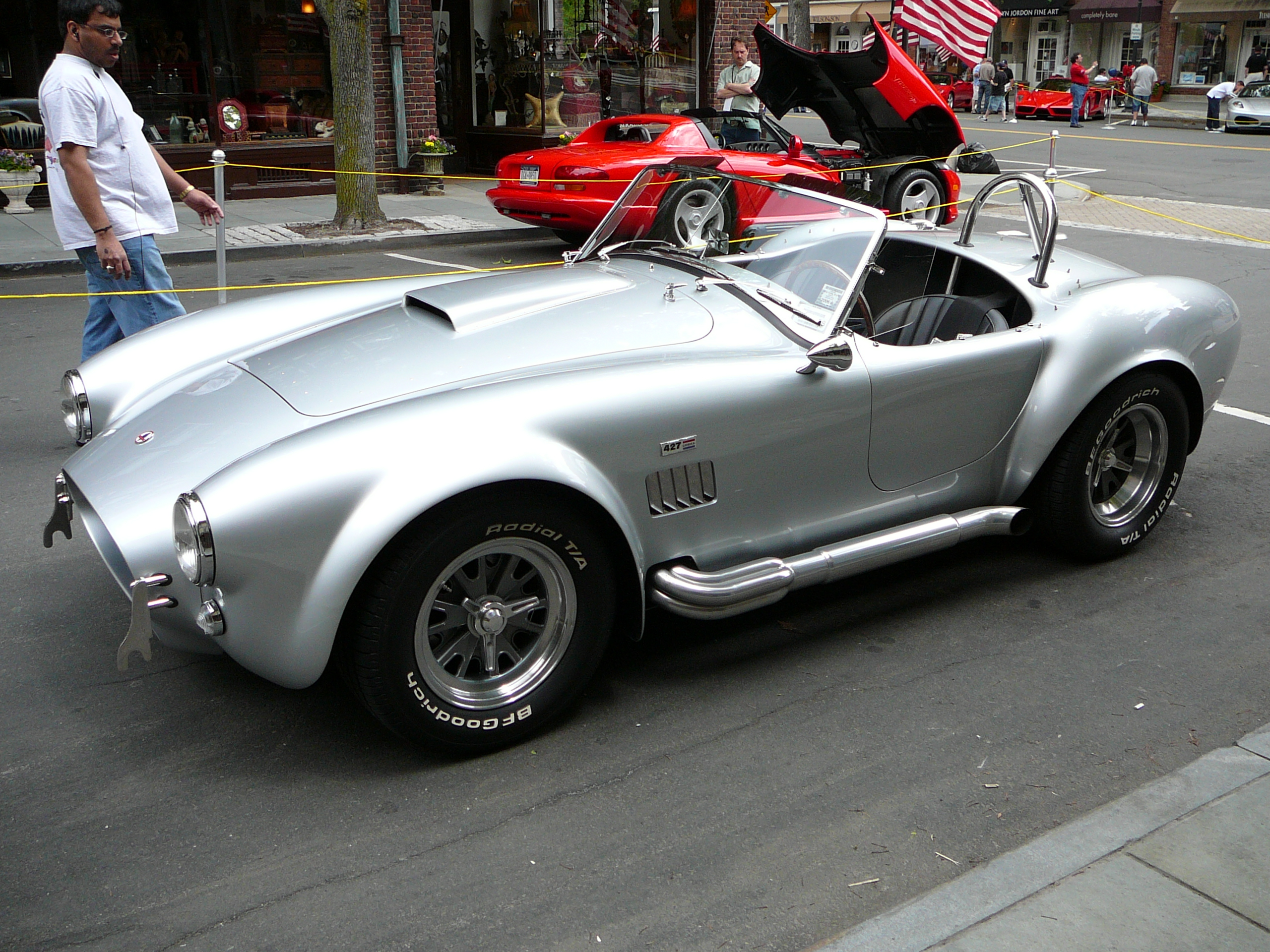
- Superformance MKIII at the Scarsdale Concourse
- Industry: Automotive
- Founded: 1992
- Headquarters: Port Elizabeth, South Africa
- Products: low volume replica sports cars

Hi-Tech Automotive is a low volume, specialist car builder and design house located in Port Elizabeth, South Africa. Most of the vehicles produced are exported, notably to the US and UK. The main distributor of the cars built by Hi-Tech is Superformance. In December 2005, Hi-Tech Automotive transferred the ownership of its subsidiary, Superformance, to the Hillbank Automotive Group, which is privately owned by Lance Stander.

All Superformance cars are originally built at Hi-Tech Automotive's 270,000-square-foot (25,000 m^{2}) plant in Port Elizabeth, South Africa before they are shipped as complete rolling chassis minus engine. Hi-Tech also supplies customers with non-road cars ready to race on the track.

== Cars produced ==
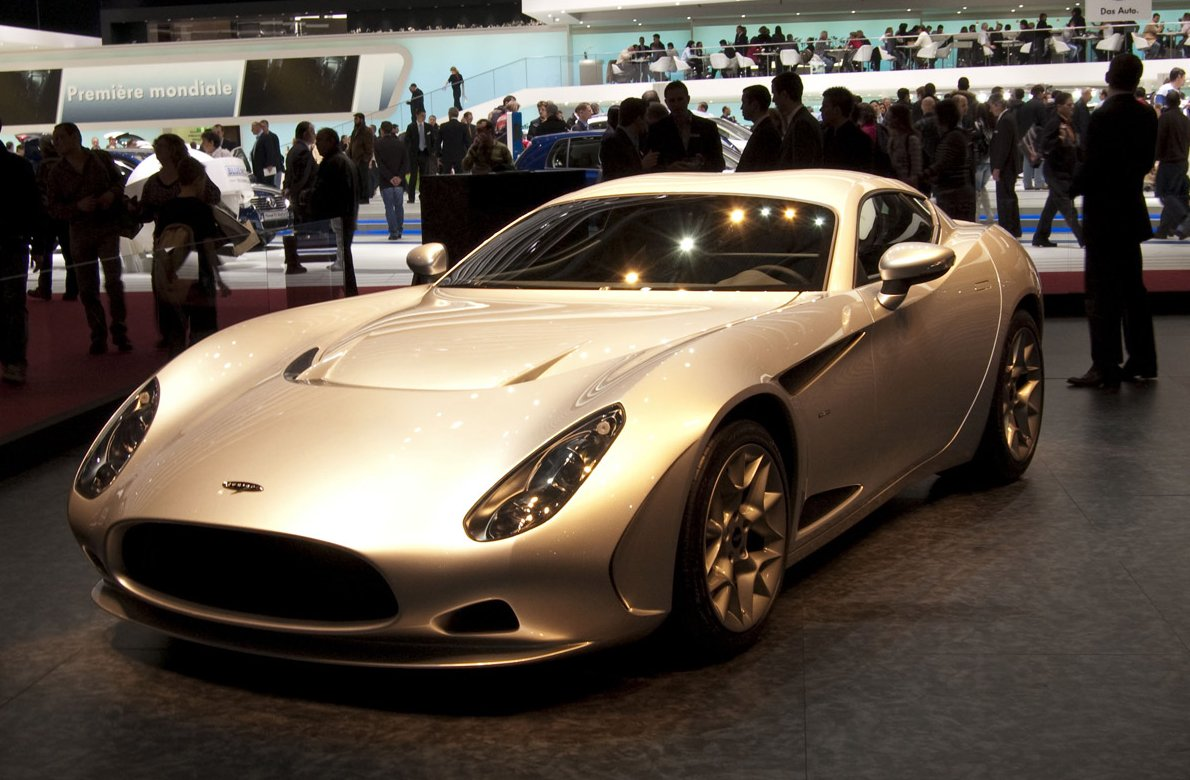
Zagato Perana Z-One series model

=== Superformance ===
The vehicles that Hi-Tech has produced or worked on includes:

- Superformance MKIII (a replica of the third generation 427 Shelby Cobra)
- Superformance MKII FIA
- Superformance MKII Slab Side
- Superformance Daytona Coupe (Discontinued)
- Superformance GT40 continuation series
- Superformance 1963 Corvette Grand Sport continuation series
- Superformance S-1 roadster (a Lotus Seven replica) (Discontinued)

=== Shelby Legendary Cars ===
- Shelby CSX 6000 MKIII
- Shelby CSX 7000 MKII FIA
- Shelby CSX 8000 MKII Slab Side
- Shelby CSX 9000 Daytona Coupe

=== Partnerships ===
- Noble M12 and M400
- Rossion Q1
- Optimal Energy Joule

The first 70 or so ROSSION Q1s were built at Hi-Tech. The ROSSION Q1 is an evolution of the NOBLE M12/M400 that was produced after NOBLE sold off the rights, But not the name to the M12/M400 design. The design rights, moulds and tooling were bought by Ian Grunes and Dean Rosen, The former US importers of the NOBLE cars and redesigned into the ROSSION Q1. Later all the Jigs, Tooling and Moulds were transferred from Hi-Tech to the Rossion production facility at the Former MOSLER factory in Florida.

Perana Z-One, with bodyshell designed by Zagato. Production of the Z-One suffered with the downturn of the world economy shortly after its release and a partnership in 2012 between Hi-Tech Automotive and AC cars of England saw the Z-One re-badged as the 378GT Zagato.

Riverside Racers FIA, a Canadian company that purchased the COBRA FIA body mold from Hi Tech (USA) and partnered with Hi Tech Automotive to produce a Cobra FIA replica. A slab side version was also developed and 50 cars were sold in the UK as the AC Classic. Models are sold in the USA as the Superformance MKII FIA or Superformance MKII Slab Side. Shelby Legendary Cars offer the CSX 7000 Cobra FIA and the CSX 8000 Cobra Slab Side.
