= Noble M400 =

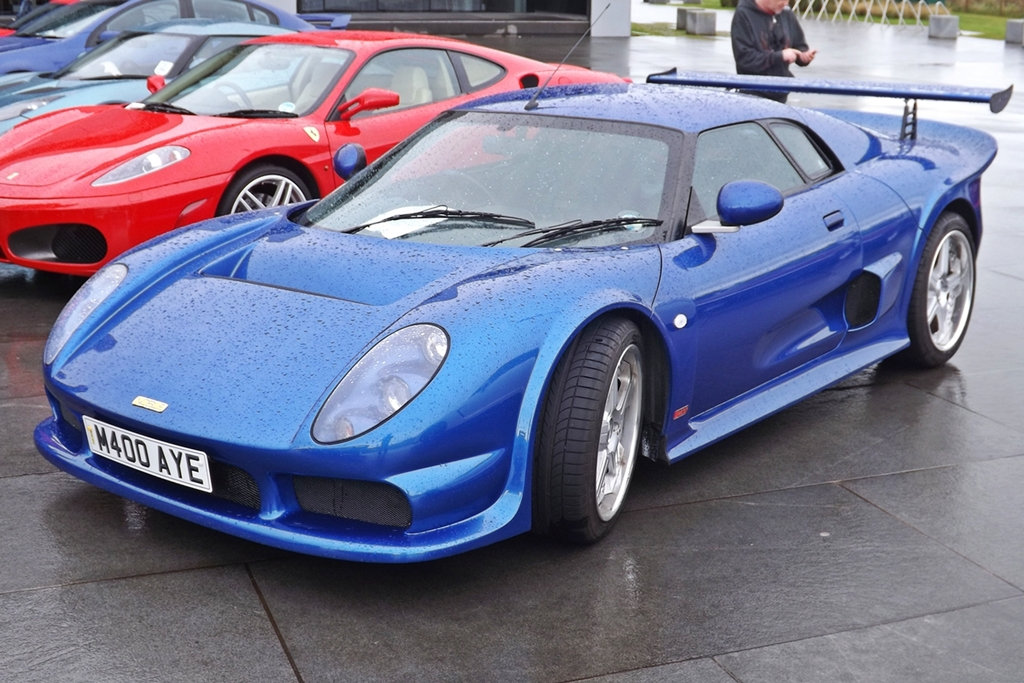

Overview
- Manufacturer: Hi-Tech Automotive under license from Noble Automotive Ltd
- Production: 2006–2007; 209 produced (48 for UK Market, 133 for US Market, 28 for South African Market)
- Assembly: South Africa: Port Elizabeth
- Designer: Lee Noble

Body and chassis
- Class: Sports car (S)
- Body style: 2-door coupé
- Layout: Rear mid-engine, rear-wheel-drive
- Related: Rossion Q1; Noble M12

Powertrain
- Engine: 3.0 L Twin-turbocharged Ford Duratec V6
- Transmission: 6-speed Getrag manual

Dimensions
- Wheelbase: 2,438 mm (96.0 in)
- Length: 4,090 mm (161.0 in)
- Width: 1,880 mm (74.0 in)
- Height: 1,143 mm (45.0 in)
- Curb weight: 1,060 kg (2,337 lb)

Chronology
- Successor: Noble M600

The Noble M400 is a sports car from the English car maker Noble. Manufacturing was outsourced to Hi-Tech Automotive, based in Port Elizabeth, South Africa. The M400 was noted by the automotive press for its excellent handling and power.

== Engine ==
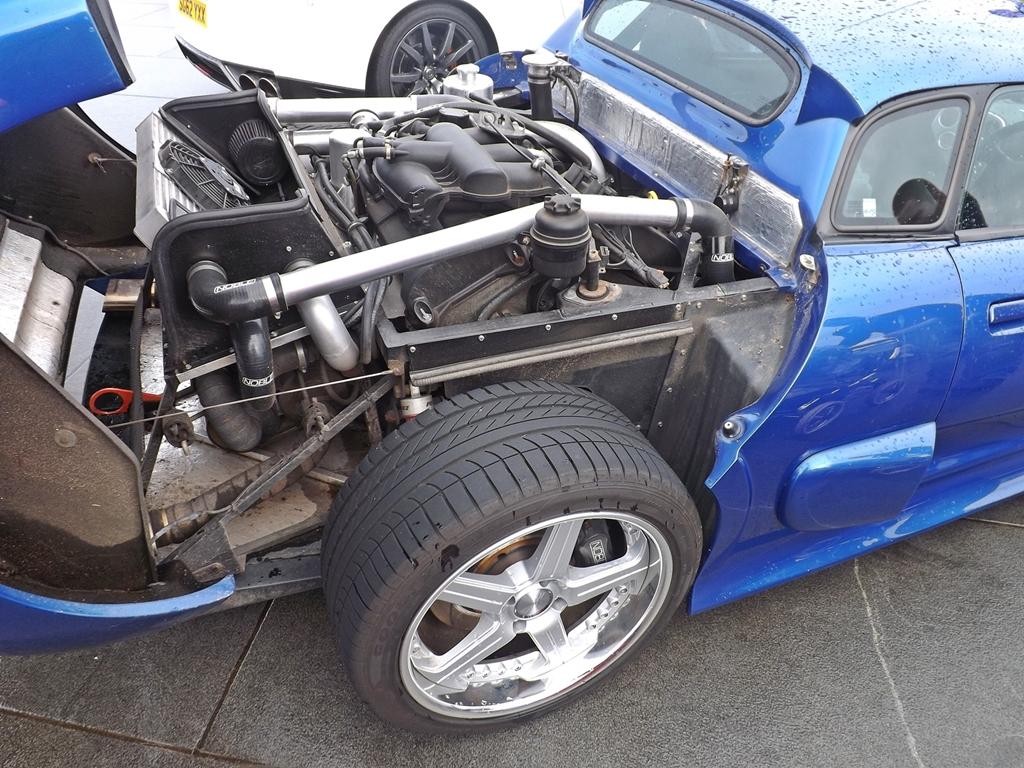
Engine of a Noble M400

The Noble M400 features a transverse rear mid-engine, rear-wheel-drive layout. The power plant is a 2,968 cc (3.0 L; 181.1 cu in) DOHC Ford Duratec V6 engine with 4 valves per cylinder, as used in the Ford Mondeo ST220. With this engine as a base, Noble fits high-lift camshafts, revised fuel injection, and Garrett AiResearch T28 twin-turbochargers. The M400 lacks driver safety aids such as ABS, stability control, traction control, and air bags. Instead, driver safety comes only from a factory racing harness and built-in roll cage.

For durability, Noble also added forged pistons, an oil cooler, a larger baffled oil sump, and extra cooling ducts. Its engine has a maximum power of 425 hp (431 PS; 317 kW) at 6,500 rpm, with a torque figure of 390 lb⋅ft (529 N⋅m) at 5,000 rpm. This power and a weight of 1,134 kg (2,500 lb) allow the M400 to achieve a power-to-weight ratio of just over 400 hp (406 PS; 298 kW)/ton (the figure for which it was named) a 0–60 mph (0–97 km/h) acceleration time of 3.2 seconds and a 1/4 mile (402 m) time of 11.4 seconds at 119.8 mph (192.8 km/h). The M400 can achieve a top speed of 187 mph (301 km/h). The UK automotive TV show Vroom Vroom suggested that the M400 gave Ferrari Enzo performance at a Porsche 911 price.

== About ==
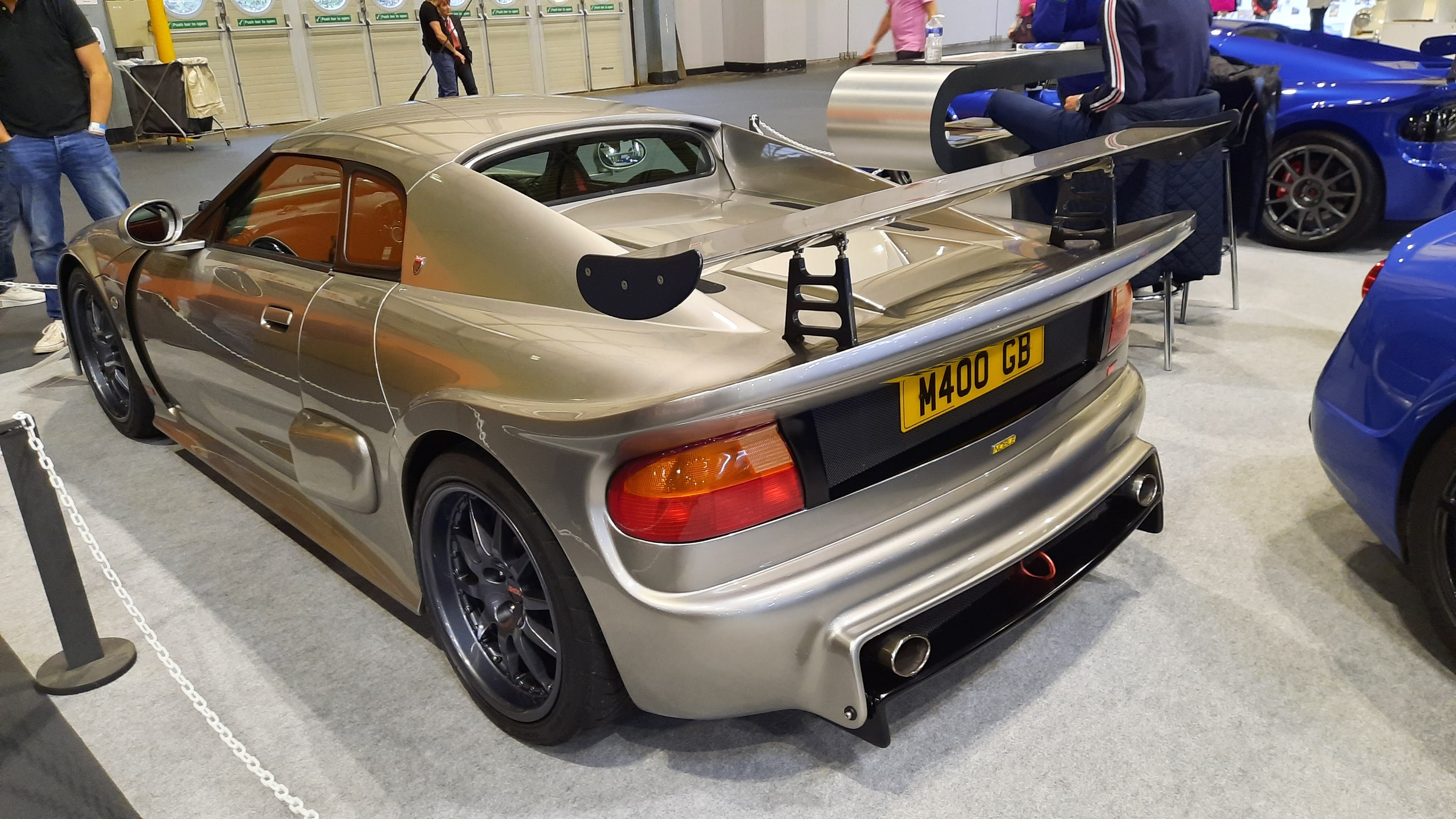
Rear view

The most notable differences from the M12 (a car which the M400 is largely based on) are the use of forged pistons, T28 turbos, a front anti-roll bar, stiffer springs, different shocks, Pirelli P Zero tyres, a smoother gear shifter, and a slightly narrower central tunnel as the driver now sits a bit more central than previous models. Exterior differences remain subtle. The colour scheme tends to incorporate anthracite (Gris) wheels, rear wing supports and wing ends but some examples maintain silver wheels and supports. The front splitter is now removed (Although many owners opt to have this put on). The main change is the addition of side pods to channel air into the engine and to create a visual impact. Air conditioning was an £1,995 option and adds to the weight. The interior has an added oil gauge that resides next to the boost gauge. Additionally, the Sparco Alcantara seats and trimmings differ from the other Nobles' (Alcantara is one third the weight of leather). The Noble M400 was awarded the car of the year award in 2005 by one publication. Only 75 examples were made.

== Rossion Q1 ==
Although, the M400 is no longer in production, the exclusive dealer for Noble in the US, 1G Racing in Ohio, USA (also known as Rossion), had obtained the production rights to the M400 from Noble Automotive, and has released an updated version named Rossion Q1. The Rossion Q1 uses an updated M400 platform, 1G's version of the M400 includes a redesigned aerodynamic shell, a new interior and an upgraded engine management system, upgrading the power output to 450 hp (336 kW). 0–60 mph (0–97 km/h) has dropped from 3.3 seconds to 3.1. Its top speed changed to 189 mph (304 km/h).
