= Rossion Q1 =

American sports car

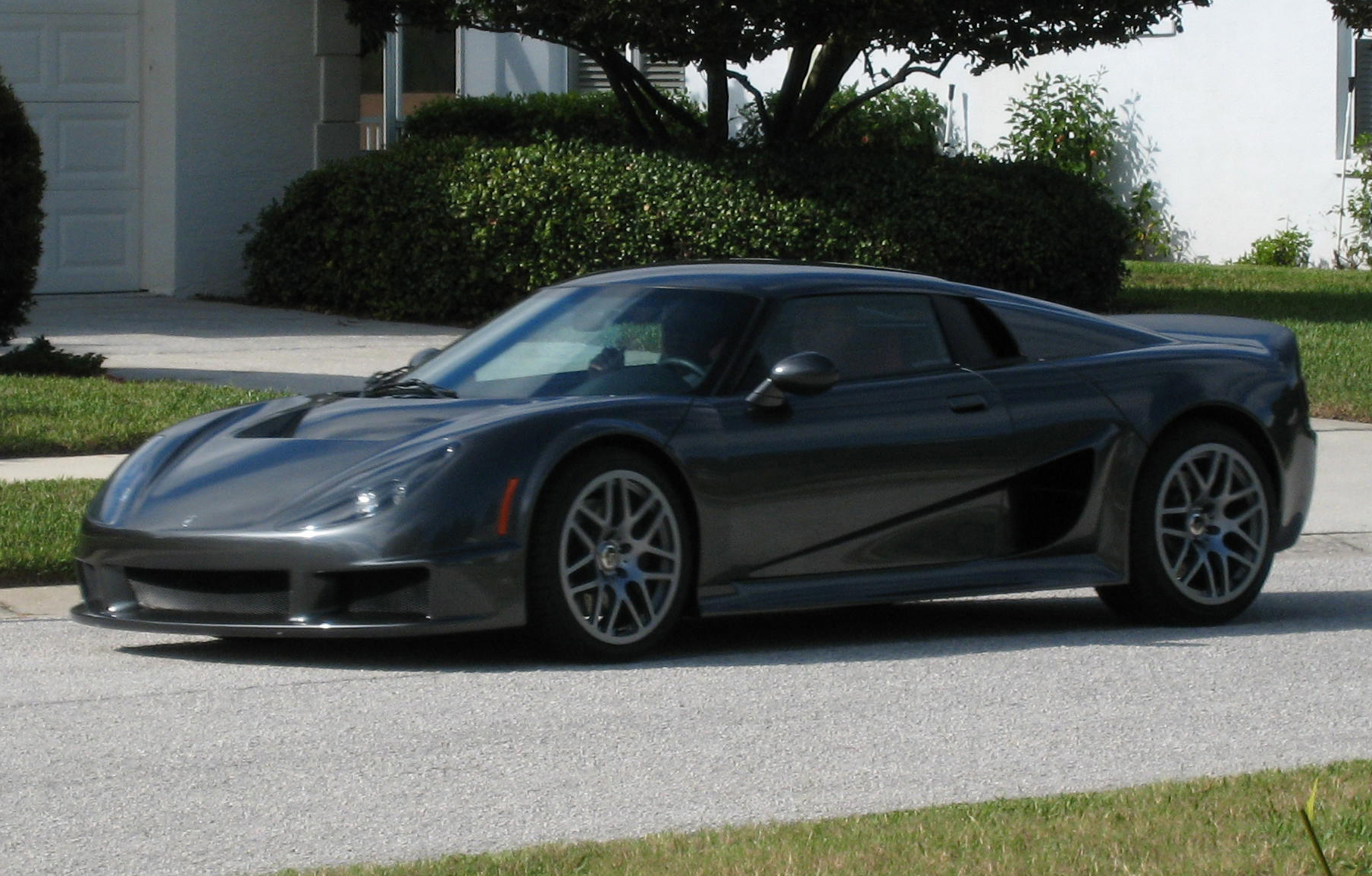

Overview
- Manufacturer: Rossion Automotive
- Production: 2008-2018
- Assembly: Riviera Beach, Florida, USA
- Designer: Ian Grunes, Dean Rosen

Body and chassis
- Class: Sports car (S)
- Body style: 2-seat coupé
- Layout: Transversely mounted, rear mid-engine, rear-wheel drive
- Related: Noble M400; Noble M12; Noble M15

Powertrain
- Engine: 3.0 L (2,967 cc) Twin-turbo re-built Ford Duratec V6 engine
- Power output: 2015: 508 hp (515 PS; 379 kW) and 521 lb⋅ft (706 N⋅m) of torque
- Transmission: Getrag 6-speed manual with Quaife automatic torque-biasing differential

Dimensions
- Wheelbase: 2,438 mm (96.0 in)
- Length: 4,115 mm (162.0 in)
- Width: 1,880 mm (74 in)
- Height: 1,130 mm (44 in)
- Curb weight: 1,043 kg (2,299 lb)

The Rossion Q1 is an American mid-engined sports car from Rossion Automotive. The Q1 is based on the Noble M400, with a new body, and a number of changes to the suspension and interior. The Q1 was sold as a kit car, with the buyer responsible for sourcing and installing the powertrain, though shops like American Speed Factory offered full engine installations.

== History ==
Development on the Q1 began after the rights to the Noble M400 chassis were acquired in February 2007. In June 2013, RP High Performance acquired Mosler Automotive (based in Riviera Beach, Florida) and moved the entire manufacturing facility from South Africa to the current location in the United States. Production of the Q1R, the track version of the existing Q1 model, began in July 2013. A redesign of the Mosler is underway, with the car to be released in the future with no definitive date yet planned. Current Q1 and Q1R models feature a fully carbon-kevlar body.

== Powertrain ==
Like the Noble M400, Rossion recommends builders of Q1s to use a 3.0 L; 181.1 cu in (2,967 cc), twin-turbocharged Ford Duratec V6 engine, paired to a 6 speed manual The 2015 Q1 produces 508 bhp (515 PS; 379 kW) at 4700 rpm, with a torque figure of 521 lb⋅ft (706 N⋅m) at 4700 rpm.

== Performance ==
The Q1 has a power-to-weight ratio of 487 bhp (494 PS; 363 kW)/ton. When tested by Car and Driver in 2010, the Q1 was able to accelerate from 0-60 mph (97 km/h) in 3.4 seconds, 0-120 mph (193 km/h) in 10.0 seconds and the 1/4 mile (402 m) was reached in 11.6 seconds. Rossion claims a top speed of 185 mph (298 km/h).

== Design ==
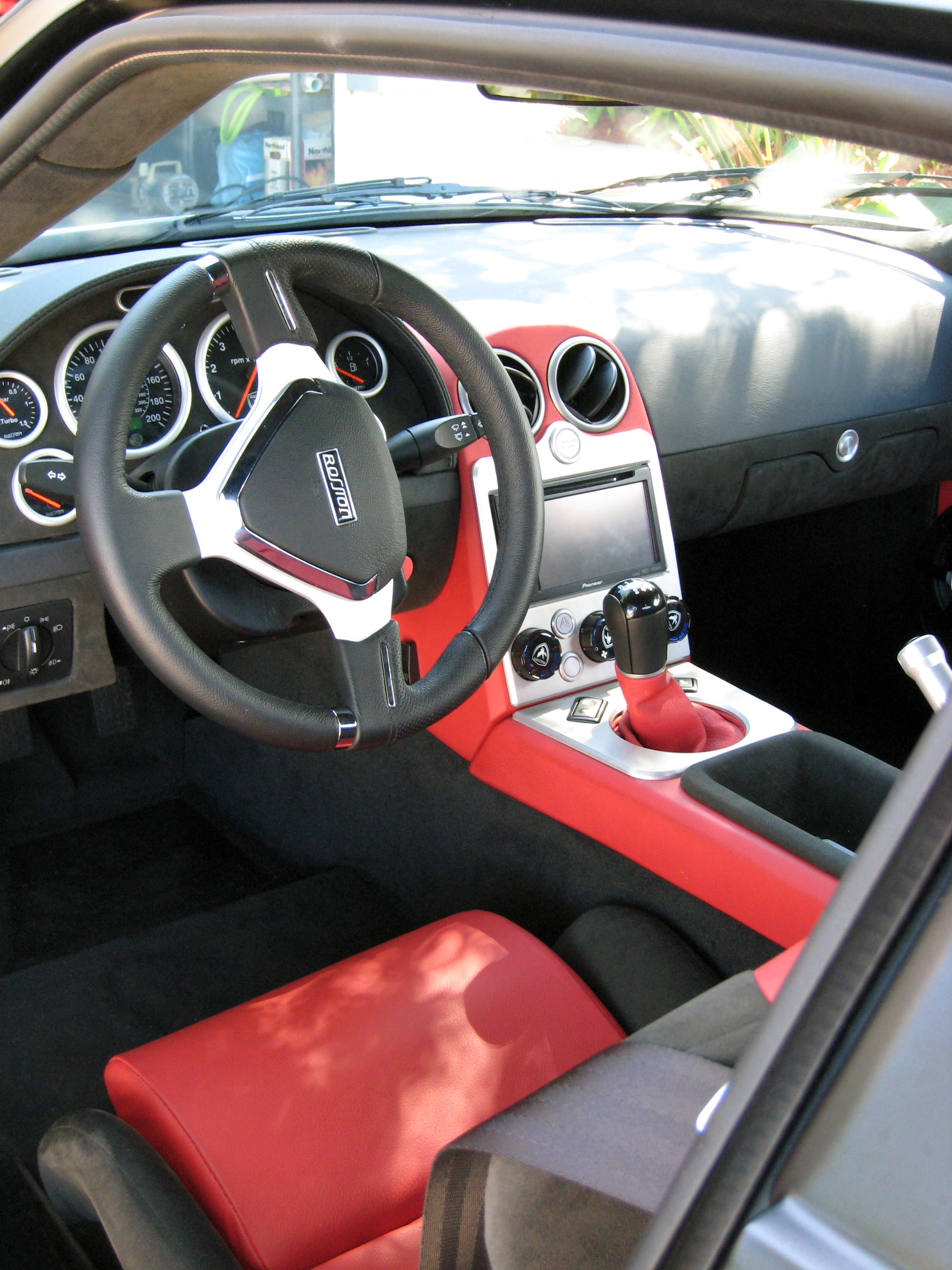
Rossion Q1 interior in red-on-black leather

The Q1 was redesigned from the M400 with a new carbon-kevlar body, new front end, large integrated air intakes and ram air side window ducts. A rear carbon-kevlar diffuser, in conjunction with the flat under tray, creates downforce on the chassis for high speed grip and stability. Rossion claims the windshield is the only body panel shared with the M400. Other additions over the M400 include power windows, remote power side mirrors, LCD touch-screen management system, back up camera, WiFi with bluetooth compatibility, smartphone link and center mounted wide screen entertainment system. The interior is also trimmed in leather, Alcantara, with diamond stitching options. Compared to the M400, the Q1 weighs 100 lb (45 kg) more, though Rossion claims they also shaved 28 lb (13 kg) of unsprung weight. According to the Rossion website, the Q1 will be available with unlimited body colors, but popular combinations are named and coordinated for national racing colors and famous race circuits around the world.
