= Ford Contour =

Ford Contour Mercury Mystique
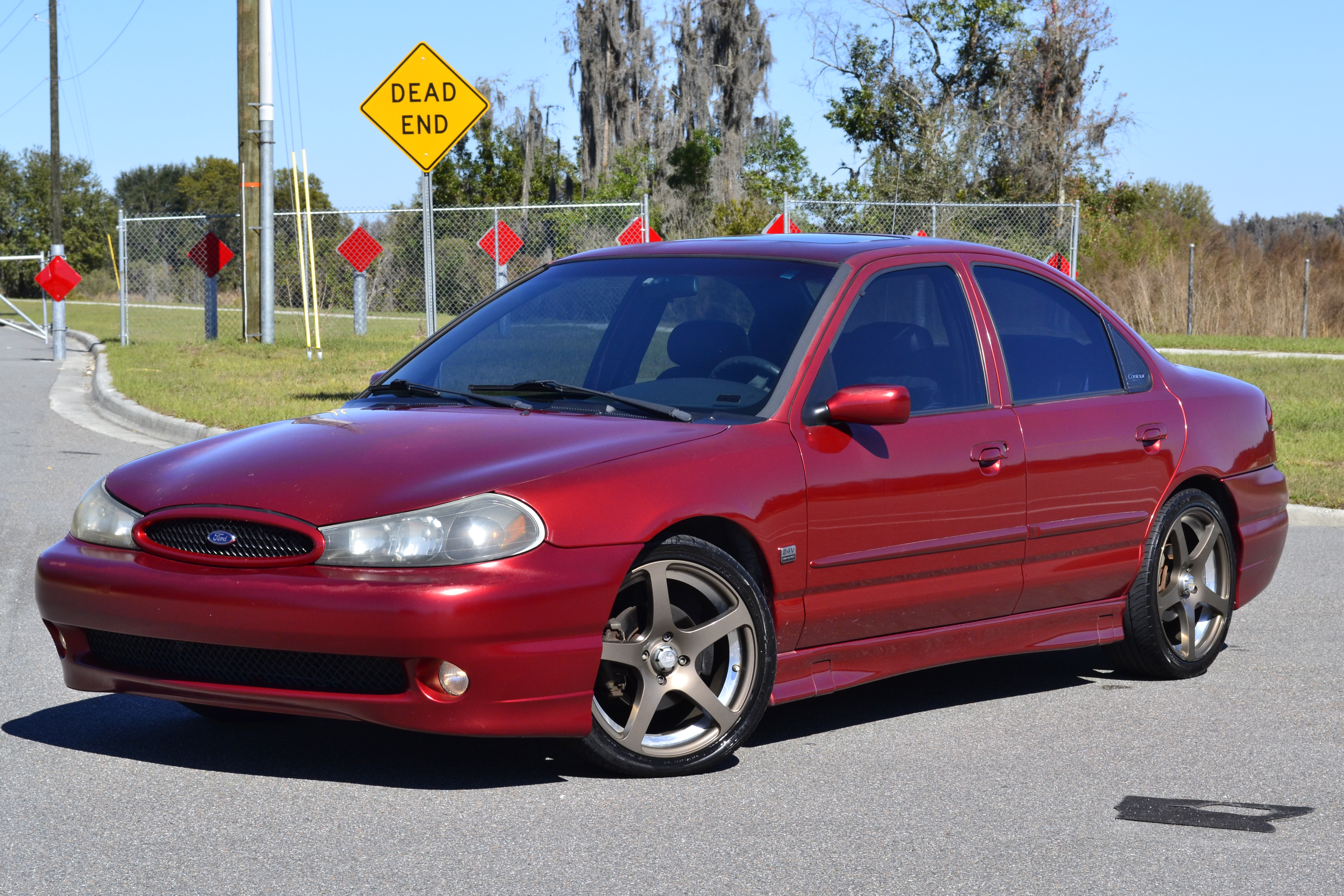
- 1998 Ford Contour SVT

Overview
- Production: August 15, 1994–October 19, 2000
- Model years: 1995–2000
- Assembly: United States: Claycomo, Missouri (Kansas City Assembly); Mexico: Cuautitlán Izcalli (Cuautitlán Assembly)
- Designer: Patrick Schiavone

Body and chassis
- Body style: 4-door sedan
- Layout: FF layout
- Platform: Ford CDW27 platform
- Related: Ford Mondeo Mk 1/Mk 2 Ford Cougar; Mercury Cougar

Powertrain
- Engine: 2.0 L Zetec I4; 2.5 L Duratec 25 V6; 2.5 L Duratec 25 SVT V6
- Transmission: 5-speed manual 4-speed automatic

Dimensions
- Wheelbase: 106.5 in (2,705 mm)
- Length: 183.9 in (4,671 mm)
- Width: 69.0 in (1,753 mm)
- Height: 54.4 in (1,382 mm)
- Curb weight: 2,769–3,038 lb (1,256–1,378 kg)

Chronology
- Predecessor: Ford Tempo/Mercury Topaz
- Successor: Ford Fusion (Americas)

The Ford Contour is a mid-size car that was marketed by Ford from the 1995 to 2000 model years. The successor to the Ford Tempo, the Contour is the fifth generation of Ford compact cars in North America. The model line is the American counterpart of the Ford Mondeo. Lincoln-Mercury marketed the model line under the Mercury Mystique nameplate (replacing the Mercury Topaz).

The Contour utilizes the front-wheel drive Ford CDW27 platform, shared with the Mystique, Mondeo Mk I and II, and the Mercury Cougar. The second world car project undertaken by Ford, the Contour and Mystique were developed alongside the Mondeo; in contrast with the Ford Escort world car, the Contour shared multiple major systems with the Mondeo, including body structure, powertrain, and suspension. In contrast with both its Tempo predecessor and the Mondeo, the Contour was sold exclusively as a four-door sedan.

While officially classified a mid-size car, the Contour was among the smallest sedans in the segment, with its interior dimensions becoming a point of criticism. To eliminate model overlap with the Ford Taurus, the Contour was marketed as the Ford compact car line (replacing the Tempo with a larger car).

Ford manufactured the Contour alongside the Mystique in its Kansas City Assembly (Claycomo, Missouri) and Cuautitlán Assembly (Cuautitlán Izcalli, Mexico) facilities. The first car was produced on August 15, 1994.

== Background ==
The development of the Ford Contour began in 1986, as Ford began work on a world car project in both the US and Europe. Though the $6 billion product remains the most expensive ever undertaken by the company, its key objective beyond the car lines was lowering production costs by securing lower prices of components; . Given a codename CDW27 (C/D segment, world car), the project sought to replace the Ford Sierra (in Europe), the Ford Tempo/Mercury Topaz (North America), and the Mazda-produced Ford Telstar (Asia, Oceania, Africa) with a single vehicle design.

In contrast with the Ford Escort world car (introduced for 1981) which resulted in two functionally different model lines, the CDW27 project was developed for over 90% design commonality between European and American-market vehicles. Ultimately, this allowed Ford to source components for vehicles from both Europe and North America; Ford was able to reduce the number of its suppliers for the model line from over 700 (used by the Tempo) to 227. Some differentiation came out of necessity, primarily because the US and Europe have separate safety requirements (including airbags, lights), though Ford of Europe was able to produce the model line with nearly 15% American-sourced content.

In contrast to the 3-box design of the Ford Tempo (and the sleeker Taurus), the Mondeo/Contour were the first Ford model lines to adopt a cab-forward configuration. Following the March 1993 launch of the Mondeo, Ford began production of the Contour 14 months later.

=== Model name origin ===
The Ford Mondeo name was derived from mundus, a Latin word for world; the nameplate was selected to denote the world car project. In North America, Ford changed the name to Ford Contour to avoid confusion around a world car assembled in North America. Denoting its relative lack of straight lines, the Contour name debuted on a 1991 concept car. The Mercury Mystique took its name on a 1991 minivan concept, sharing a "T-drive" powertrain with the Contour.

== Model overview ==
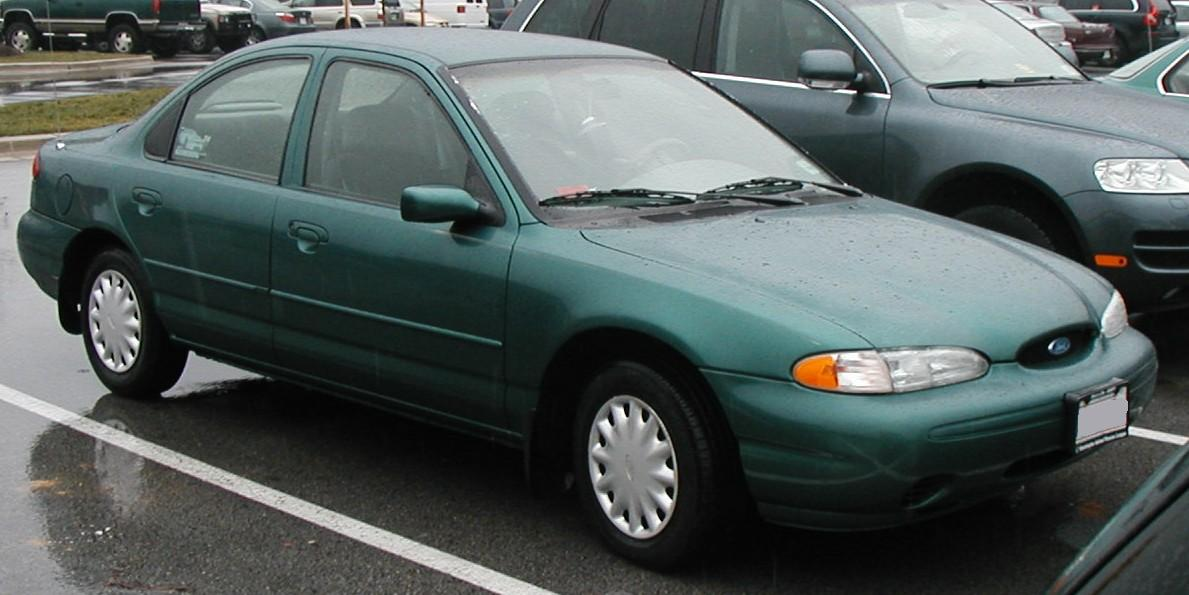
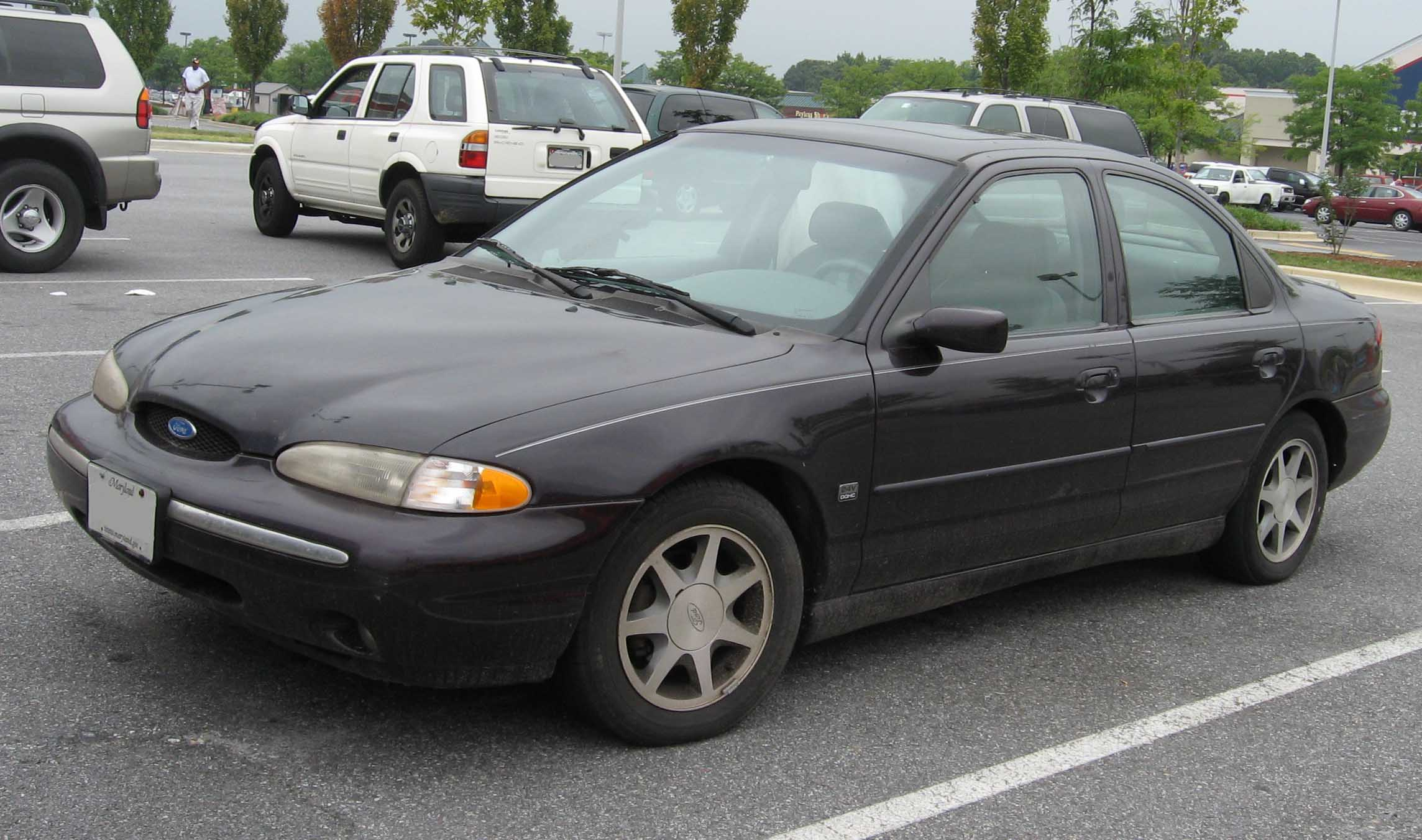
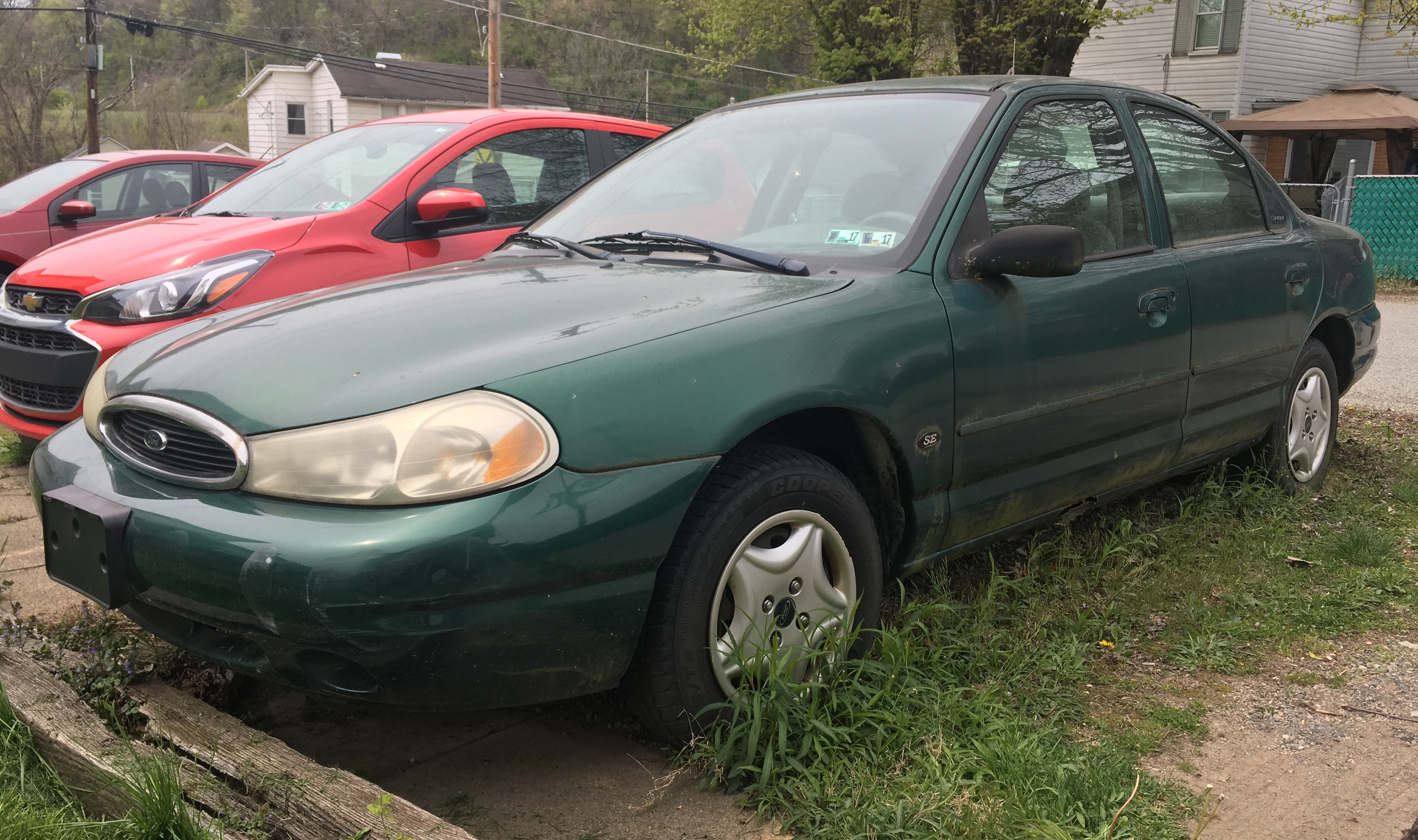
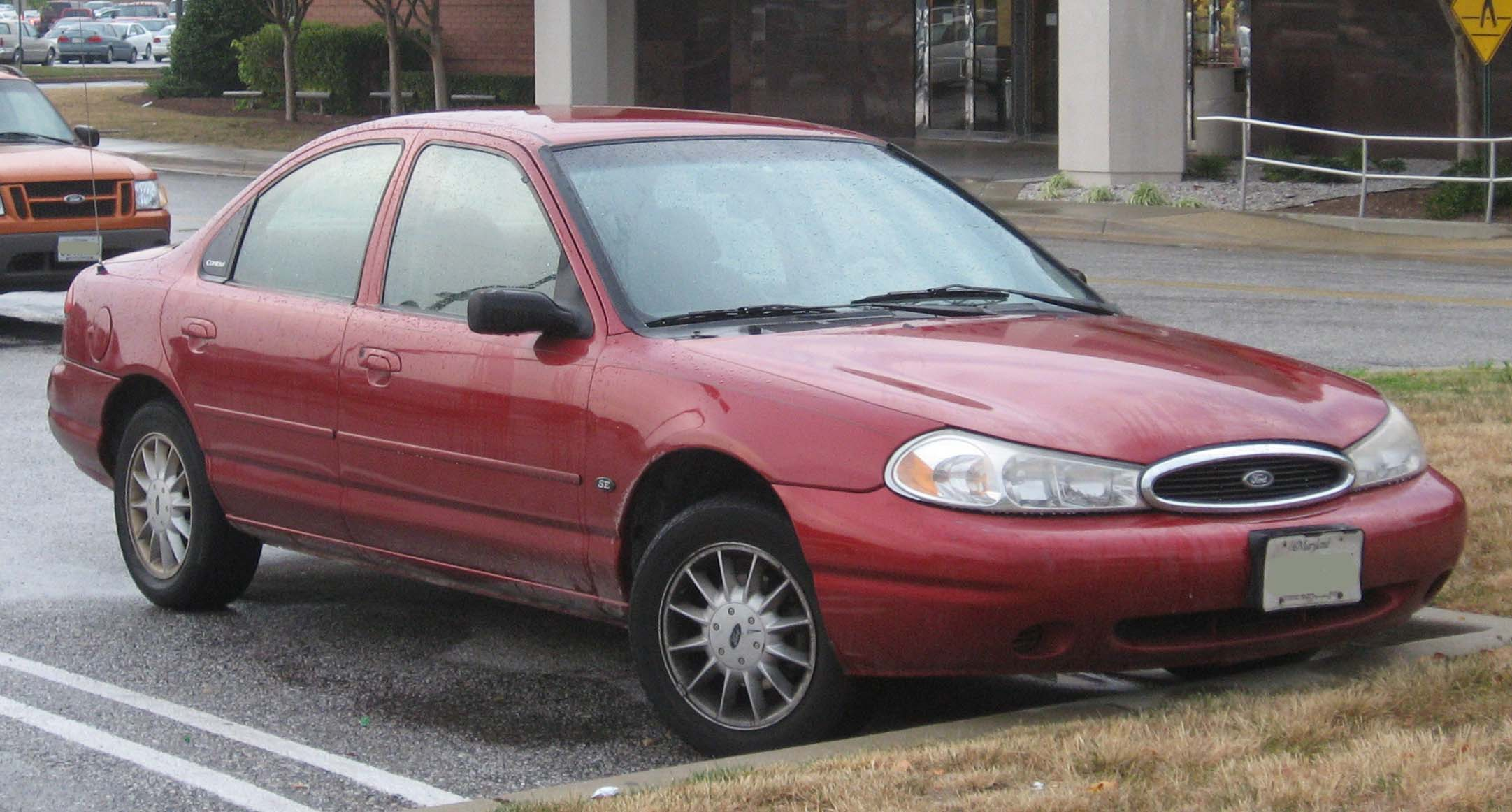
Top row: 1995 Ford Contour GL, 1995 Ford Contour SE
Bottom row: 2000 Ford Contour SE, 1998 Ford Contour SE

=== Chassis ===
The Ford Contour uses the front-wheel drive Ford CDW27 platform on a 106.5-inch wheelbase (longer than the 1986 Ford Taurus). The CDW27 is of unibody construction, including a front subframe.

The front suspension was a short-long arm design with MacPherson struts; the rear suspension was a "Quadralink" multilink design. Front disc/rear drum brakes were standard, with four-wheel disc brakes fitted to higher-trim vehicles; anti-lock brakes (ABS) and traction control were optionally fitted.

==== Powertrain details ====
The Contour and Mystique shared two engines with the Mondeo, a 125 hp 2.0 L Zetec inline-4 and a 170 hp 2.5 L Duratec V6; the 1.8L turbodiesel of the Mondeo was never sold in North America. A five-speed manual transmission was standard with both engines, with a four-speed automatic offered with as an option.

- 2.0 L Zetec I4 125 hp (97 kW)
- 2.5 L Duratec 25 V6 170 hp (125 kW)
- 2.5 L Duratec 25 V6 195 hp (145 kW) (1998 SVT)
- 2.5 L Duratec 25 V6 200 hp (149 kW) (1999 and 2000 SVT)

=== Body ===
Though the two model lines looked similar externally, the Contour wore different body panels from the Mondeo, sharing only the windshield, sideview mirrors, door glass, and door handles. While the Mondeo was offered as a four-door sedan, five-door hatchback, and a 5-door station wagon, the Contour was marketed only as a four-door sedan. Styled with a larger oval grille (framed by the hood), the Contour was fitted with different headlamps and taillamps from the Mondeo, the Contour utilized amber parking lamps and red turn signals. In contrast with the Mondeo, the Contour was fitted with body-color trim moldings and chrome trim moldings on the bumpers (on all trims).

The interior of the Contour differed slightly from its Mondeo counterpart; though the instrument cluster was shared between the two vehicles (though with a speedometer reading MPH), the dashboard was different. Sharing its radio and climate controls with the Taurus, the Contour GL was fitted with a different center console (trading its ashtray for two cupholders ahead of the shifter); the Contour LX and SE shared a nearly identical design as the Mondeo. In a first for the American market, the Contour/Mystique were fitted with a standard cabin air filter.

==== 1998 facelift ====
For 1998 production, Ford released a mid-cycle revision of the Contour. Distinguished by its front fascia, the 1998 Contour was restyled with a larger oval grille (framed with chrome oval on all trims). The headlight clusters were shared with the Mondeo (with amber parking lamps), with a single full-width taillamp fitted to the rear. As with the Mondeo, the Contour added its model name to the rear door trim. Slotted above the Contour SE, the Contour SVT (see below) was fitted with an upgraded 2.5 L engine and chassis enhancements.

=== Trim ===
The Ford Contour was offered in three trim levels: GL (1995-1997), a higher-content LX, and a sporty SE trim. The 2.0L engine was standard on GL and LX versions, with the 2.5L standard with SE trim. As a running change during 1996, a "Sport" option package was introduced for GL and SE-trim models.

The Mercury Mystique was produced with two trim levels: standard-trim GS and higher-trim LS (with a "Sport" option package available for both versions); from 1997 to 1999, an undesignated base-trim Mystique was offered.

== Ford Contour SVT (1998–2000) ==
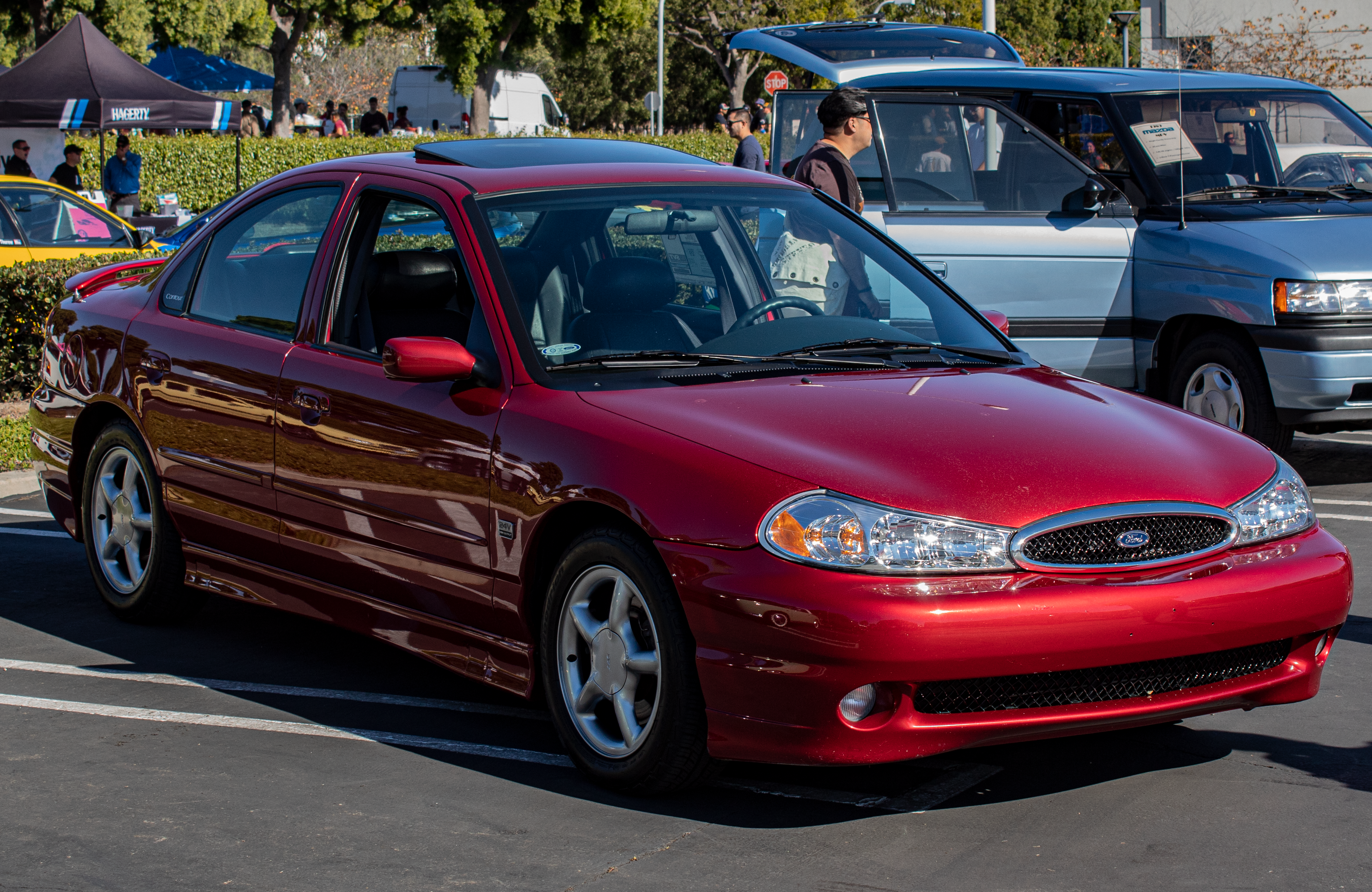
1998 Ford Contour SVT

Introduced for 1998, the Ford Contour SVT is a higher-performance version of the model line developed by the Ford Special Vehicle Team (SVT); all examples were sourced from Kansas City Assembly. In line with Ford Mustang SVT Cobras, the Ford SVT Contour was available primarily by special order at specially designated Ford dealerships.

The chassis underwent multiple upgrades, including re-tuned suspension, upgraded brakes, larger wheels and high-performance tires. The 2.5 L V6 was retuned, increasing its output to 195 hp. The SVT was fitted with different seats and trim, white-face gauges for the instrument cluster; and a standard 5-speed manual transmission. To distinguish the Contour SVT from the Contour SE, the SVT was fitted with 16-inch wheels and a lower body kit.

During the 1998 model year, SVT made further enhancement to the model line. Though technically designated as "E1" vehicles (initial production was "E0"), the revision led to an unofficial 1998.5 model year designation. Distinguished by SVT-specific 5-spoke alloy wheels (moving from Goodyear GS-C to Goodyear Eagle F1 tires of the same 205/55-16 size). In addition to grippier tires, retuned front struts upgraded handling even further (increasing skidpad grip from .84 to .90 G). The interior saw several revisions, as the split-folding rear seats were retired (from the SVT only), the dashboard clock was relocated to the radio display, and the temperature gauge in the instrument cluster was revised (removing "normal" from the middle).

For 1999, the engine was retuned, increasing output to 200 hp. The Ford Mondeo released its counterpart to the SVT, named the Ford Mondeo ST200. Though sharing its 200 hp 2.5 L V6, the Mondeo ST200 adapted different chassis and interior modifications from the Contour SVT.

Year	Engine	Power	Torque	Production
1998	2.5 L Duratec 25 SVT V6	195 hp (145 kW)	165 ft·lbf (224 N·m)	4,485
1998.5	2.5 L Duratec 25 SVT V6	195 hp (145 kW)	165 ft·lbf (224 N·m)	2,050
1999	2.5 L Duratec 25 SVT V6	200 hp (149 kW)	169 ft·lbf (229 N·m)	2,760
2000	2.5 L Duratec 25 SVT V6	200 hp (149 kW)	169 ft·lbf (229 N·m)	2,150
Total				11,445

== Mercury Mystique (1995–2000) ==
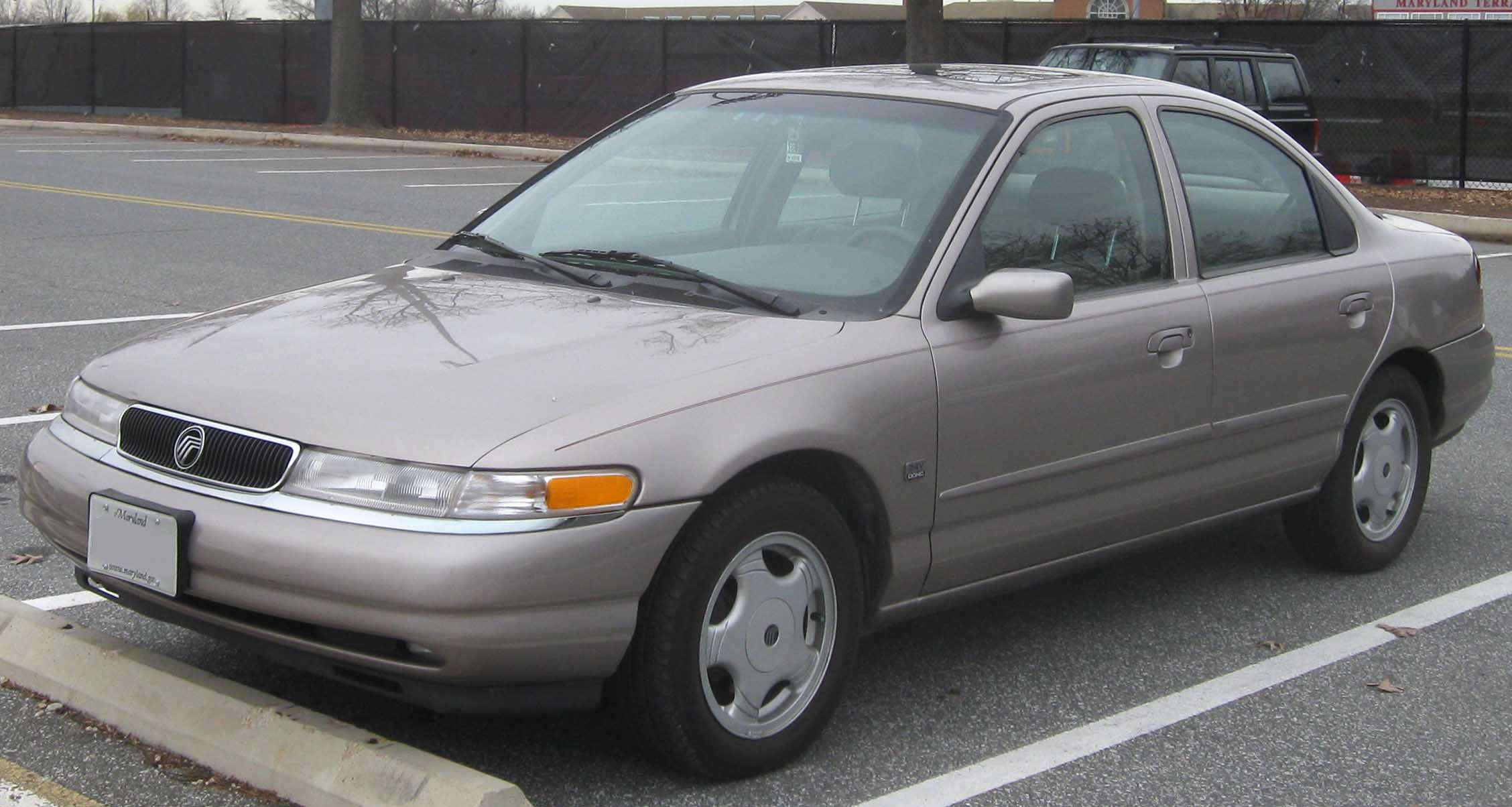
1995 Mercury Mystique LS

1998-2000 Mercury Mystique LS

Introduced alongside the Ford Contour, the Mercury Mystique was a divisional counterpart of the model line sold by Lincoln-Mercury. Taking its nameplate from a 1991 concept vehicle, the Mystique replaced the Mercury Topaz in the Mercury model line. Slotted above the Tracer in size, the Mystique became the smallest Mercury vehicle for the 2000 model year. As with the Contour, the Mystique was produced only as a four-door sedan (the two-door Topaz was not replaced).

Sharing much of its body with the Contour, the Mystique was styled with a chrome grille surround (in place of the Mercury full-width lightbar) and a full-width taillamp. The traditional block lettering used by Mercury was retired in favor of italicized lettering.

The Mystique followed the rest of the Mercury car line in its trim nomenclature, marketing a standard-trim Mystique GS and a higher-trim Mystique LS.

At the beginning of the 2000 model year, Mercury retired the Mystique (making the Sable its smallest car).

== Model history ==
=== 1996 ===
- The backs of the front seats were recessed, improving rear seat leg room.
- Rear seat cushions were lowered to increase headroom.
- Chrome bumper strips were now body color, resulting in bumpers that were monochromatic.
- Seven-spoke alloy wheels become standard for SE model.
- Split rear seats now available on all models.
- The powertrain control module was changed to the newer EEC-V to be OBD-II compliant.
- Manual transmission was reworked for easier shifts.
- New colors.
- A user could now use one key to unlock all the doors.
- A leather finished steering wheel was optional leather on the Mercury Mystique.

=== 1997 ===
- New value-priced base models were introduced in late 1997 for both Contour and Mystique.
- Traction control is dropped as an option.
- Added interior trunk light
- Steering wheels now tilt
- Heated mirrors are dropped as an option.
- "Unleaded fuel only" label was removed from the fuel gauge.
- Various interior plastic pieces and covers on the Contour are no longer spray-painted silver and are left black.
- Remote fuel door release is dropped.
- Mystique – optional CD player and power front seats on GS, standard on LS
- Monochromatic bumper strips were removed altogether.

=== 1998 ===
- New design for front and rear fascias, including a chrome grille surround and larger headlights; Mystique gets side Mercury emblems on the rear quarter windows.
- Mystique's interior also received new fabric choices (leather seating, previously optional, became standard on LS models) and faux wood trim to make it more upscale than the Contour.
- Five-speed manual transmission changed from rod shift to cable shift.
- High-performance Contour SVT version debuts, available only in Silver Frost, Toreador Red, and Black Ebony with Midnight Blue interior.
- Roof line altered and the rear deck shortened for improved rear seat headroom
- Seat recliner is changed from a knob to a lever.
- Seatbelt for rear center seat is improved from two-point to three-point.
- New center consoles; pop-up cup holders are replaced and are now molded into the console.
- Glove box light, underhood light, lighted sun visors, and door handle lights are removed.
- Integrated rear child-safety seats are optional on the Mystique.
- Warning lights on the instrument cluster were relocated to different spots. Moldings stayed the same.
- The red empty marker on the fuel gauge was left white.
- "Second-generation" airbags were made standard.

=== Mid-1998 (SVT) ===
In mid-production for the 1998 model (manufactured after February 1998), Ford decided to make several more changes to the SVT Contour. This resulted in a noticeable distinction between early and late 1998 SVT Contours. To differentiate between the two, the late 1998 model is sometimes referred to as the "1998.5", or alternatively the early 1998 model as the "E0" and the late 1998 model as the "E1". The mid-year changes are as listed below.

- Split rear seats are now available only on the SE model.
- In-dash clock is relocated to the stereo head unit display.
- New Cobra-style SVT aluminum alloy wheels
- SVT-specific Goodyear Eagle F1 tires replace Goodyear GS-C tires. The 205/55-16 size is retained.
- Different strut valving and tires raised skid pad numbers from .84 to .90 G.
- The word "normal" was removed from the temperature gauge. "C" for cool and "H" for hot were added.

=== 1999 ===
- All models are equipped with a slightly larger fuel tank at 15.4 gallons.
- A slight change was made in dash design. The plastic piece around front window was eliminated.
- Seats were again altered for additional rear leg room.
- The 2.0 L I4 engine received an additional 5 hp
- Contour SVT engine rating was upped 5 hp to 200 hp due to additional abrasive flow machining of the primary and secondary intake ports.
- SVT is offered in Tropic Green.
- SVT gains tan leather interior for Tropic Green and Toreador Red, and optional on Black Ebony cars.
- SVT gets new BF Goodrich KDW tires. Size changes to 215/50-16.
- Revised transmission synchronizers addressed an issue in the 1998 SVT.
- Mystique's suspension was tuned for a softer ride.

=== 2000 ===
- Displacement on the Duratec V6 engine decreased slightly, but the compression ratio was increased to compensate. This was done to keep the engine used in Mazda vehicles to maintain a lower engine displacement based tax level in Japan.
- Ground effect side skirts on the Contour SE Sport were discontinued
- Rear spoiler option was added for the SVT
- Four-cylinder Contour models continued as fleet vehicles only.
- Mystique GS and LS models returned with emergency in-trunk releases. Mercury pulled the Mystique from its lineup early in the 2000 model year. Production ended for the Mystique on December 23, 1999, but Contour production continued into late fall of 2000 to support rental fleets.
- The last Ford Contour rolled off the assembly line on October 19, 2000.
- Ford narrowed its lineup, with the most similar replacement for the Contour, the Fusion, not debuting until 2006

== Reception ==
The Contour and Mystique were praised for their handling and ride quality, and were described as a "fun four-door sedan that offered European moves at American prices" by Edmunds. For the SVT trim, Edmunds.com named the Contour SVT the most wanted sedan under $25,000 for 1999.

The Contour and Mystique made Car and Driver magazine's Ten Best list for 1995, 1996 and 1997. Although Car and Driver staff wrote an article in 2009 apologizing for the inclusion of the Ford Contour on the "Ten Best" list, it was the only car the staff did not outright recant from the list, saying in hindsight, the car should have been considered too small for its price range to properly meet criteria, and that this is the likely reason for the car's failure to achieve widespread appeal.

The Ford Contour was also named as an Automobile magazine All Star for 1995, 1996, 1997, and 1998.

== Safety ==
The Insurance Institute for Highway Safety gave the Contour a "Poor" overall rating in the frontal impact crash. The head, neck, and chest were all well protected and the dummy movement was well controlled, but excessive footwell intrusion contributed to high forces on both legs and a "Marginal" structural rating. The Contour received five stars for both the driver and passenger in the NHTSA test.
