= Ford Duratec V6 engine =

Ford Duratec V6
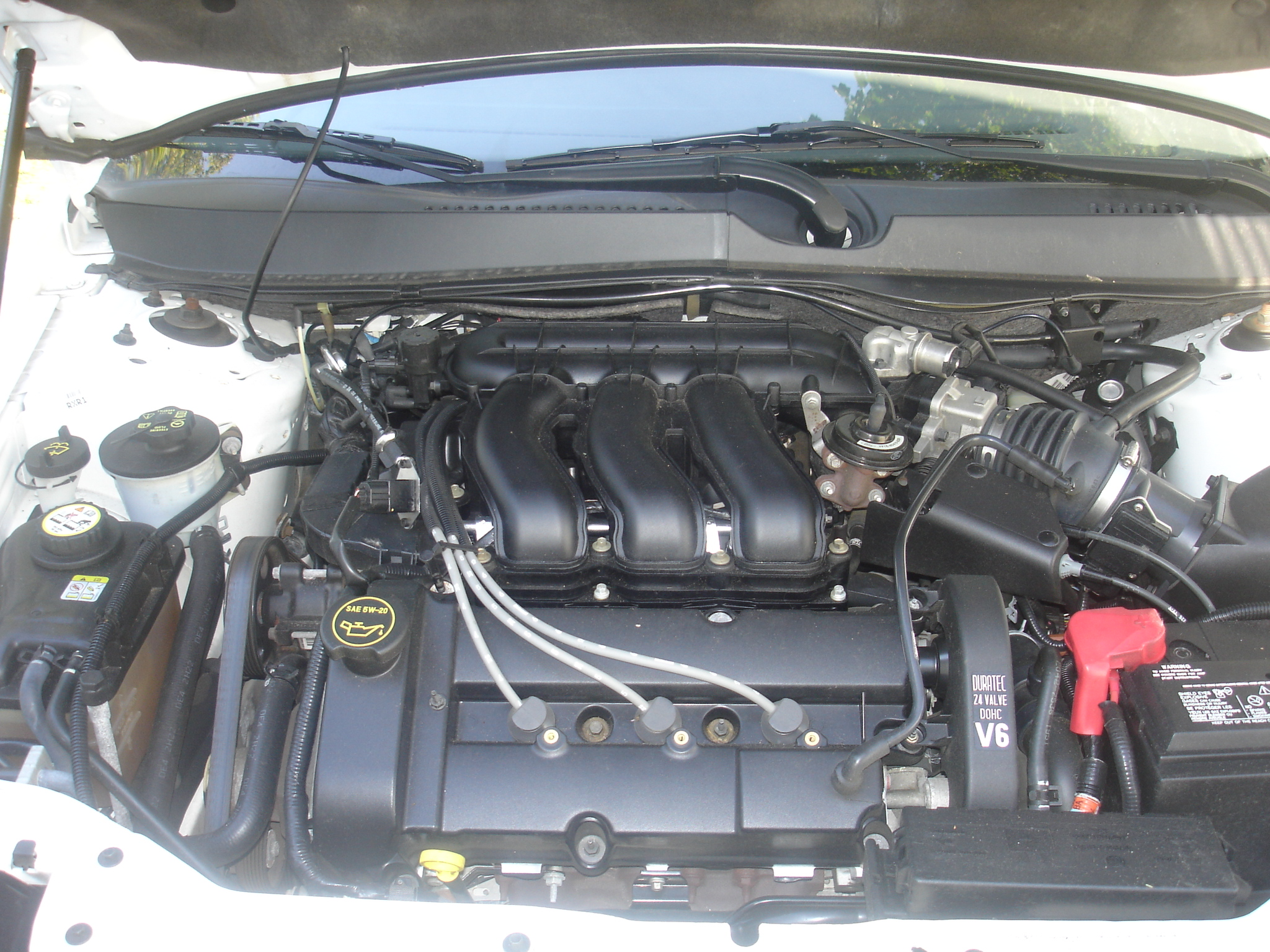
- 3.0 L (2,967 cc) in a Mercury Sable

Overview
- Manufacturer: Ford
- Also called: Mondeo V6
- Production: 1993-2012

Layout
- Configuration: 60° V6
- Displacement: 2.5 L; 152.4 cu in (2,498 cc); 2.5 L; 155.2 cu in (2,544 cc); 3.0 L; 181.1 cu in (2,967 cc)
- Cylinder bore: 81.66 mm (3.21 in); 82.4 mm (3.24 in); 89 mm (3.5 in)
- Piston stroke: 79.5 mm (3.13 in)
- Cylinder block material: Aluminum
- Cylinder head material: Aluminum
- Valvetrain: DOHC 4 valves x cyl. with VVT
- Valvetrain drive system: Chain
- Compression ratio: 9.7:1-10.0:1

RPM range
- Max. engine speed: 6500

Combustion
- Turbocharger: Twin-turbo (on Noble M400 and Rossion Q1)
- Fuel system: Sequential multi-port fuel injection
- Management: BorgWarner
- Fuel type: Gasoline
- Oil system: Wet sump
- Cooling system: Water-cooled

Output
- Power output: 170–508 hp (127–379 kW)
- Torque output: 165–521 lb⋅ft (224–706 N⋅m)

Chronology
- Predecessor: Ford Essex V6; Ford Vulcan; Mazda K series
- Successor: Ford Cyclone engine (Upper size: Duratec 35); Ford EcoBoost engine (Mazda MZI 35, Mazda GY)

The Ford Duratec V6 is an aluminum-block, dual overhead cam V6 engine with a 60° bank angle and cast iron cylinder liners. It was introduced with the 1993 Ford Mondeo and used widely through 2012 in numerous vehicles by Ford's associates brands, including Mercury, Lincoln, Jaguar and Mazda.

Ford's design brief outlined an engine for front-drive, transverse layouts that was short enough for an 11-metre turning radius and with class-leading performance, emissions, economy and durability, as well as reduced NVH.

Interviewed at the time of the engine's U.S. launch in the Ford Contour, head of Ford's V6 program Bruce Coventry noted that Ford had turned to Porsche at a time when its engine development resources were stretched thin. Porsche had already completed the engine's early development, which explains its commonality with Porsche's engines of the period. Notably, the cylinder head design and the use of a main bearing ladder recall Porsche's V8 engine design for its 928.

While the primary engineering was Porsche-derived, Ford licensed a high-integrity cylinder head manufacturing method from Cosworth. Specifically, this involved a sand casting process developed by noted scientist John Campbell, known as the Cosworth Casting Method. This technique used zircon as its casting aggregate. To improve material uniformity, the mold was preheated, cooled to achieve even temperatures, and rotated during casting. This process created dimensional accuracy, high strength, and a dense structure with low or no porosity .

The Duratec's design was inspired by the variable intake system on Ford's 4.6-litre modular V8, which used dual intake ports that opened and closed to vary the effective inlet tract length. Due to this system, the torque on the early 2.5-litre variant of the US-market Contour varied by no more than five per cent from 1,500 rpm up to 5,200 rpm. Bruce Coventry said, “There won’t be a four-valve V6 that can match our torque curve." At higher speeds, the engine's inlet tract was effectively shortened. The design featured a cam chain instead of a belt, an efficient water pump and an over-capacity oil pump.

The engine features fracture-split (cracked) forged powder metal connecting rods, and a forged steel crankshaft in two major variants for the 3.0L version: a 232 hp using direct-acting mechanical bucket (DAMB) tappets and a 208 hp variant using roller finger followers (RFF) .

The engines were manufactured at Ford's Cleveland Engine Plant 2, which had undergone a $688M renovation in 1988 when the 3.0L Duratec engine family was under design. Every engine was hot-run on an 85-foot, 34-station carousel that monitored eight critical operational functions for a minimum of four minutes prior to its completion. Approximately 3.5 million 3.0L Duratec engines had been manufactured by late 2005.

== 2.5 L ==
The Duratec 25 is a 2.5 L (2544 cc) 60° V6 and was introduced in 1994. It was developed for the Ford Contour and also used in the Ford Mondeo Mk 1 and others. Bore and stroke is 82.4 mm × 79.5 mm (3.24 in × 3.13 in).

The Duratec 25 was on the Ward's 10 Best Engines list for 1995 and 1996, and the SVT version made the list for 1998 and 1999.

=== SVT ===
An SVT version produced 195 hp (145 kW) and 165 lb⋅ft (224 N⋅m) in 1998. It included a larger throttle body from the Duratec 30, a new cone-shaped air filter, and abrasive flow machining processing on the intake manifold. SVT specific cams, a lighter flywheel and low-restriction exhaust complete the picture. Further improvements (mostly improved intake porting of the heads) were made in 1999 that raised power output to 200 hp (149 kW) and 169 lb⋅ft (229 N⋅m) and were carried over in the 2000 model. The SVT engine was used in the 1998 to 2001 European Ford Mondeo Mk 2, Ford Cougar and called the ST200, it also appeared in the American Ford Contour SVT.

=== Duratec 2.5 L ===
The Duratec 2.5 L (aka Mondeo V6) DOHC 24 valve engine had 170 hp (127 kW) at 6,250 rpm and 165 lb⋅ft (224 N⋅m) of torque at 4250 rpm. Used in the Ford Mondeo Mk 3 and last generation Ford/Mercury Cougar (1999-2002). The Displacement of the 2.5 L V6 was decreased from 2544 to 2495cc.

=== Mazda GY ===
Mazda used the Duratec 25 block and camshafts in their 2000 MPV. However, they reduced the size from 2.54 to 2.50 L (2,544 to 2,495 cc) to keep under a 2.5 L tax cap in Japan. This was accomplished with a reduction of the bore from 82.42 mm (3.245 in) to 81.66 mm (3.215 in). The engine produced 170 hp (127 kW) at 6250 rpm and 165 lb⋅ft (224 N⋅m) of torque. It was replaced in 2002 with the larger 3.0 L Duratec 30-based Mazda AJ.

== 3.0 L ==
Ford's DOHC V6, marketed as the Duratec 30, was introduced in 1996 as a replacement for the 3.8 L Essex engine used in the Ford Taurus and Mercury Sable. The 3.0L with its 181 cubic inches (2,967 cc) of displacement and produces between 200 hp (149 kW) and 240 hp (179 kW) it was essentially a variant of the Duratec 25, bored to 88.9 mm (3.50 in). Manufactured at Ford's Cleveland Engine #2 plant, a slightly modified version for the Ford Five Hundred entered production at the Cleveland Engine #1 plant in 2004.

Using an aluminum engine block and aluminum DOHC cylinder heads, the cylinders are lined with cast iron. It uses sequential fuel injection, has 4 valves per cylinder and features fracture-split forged powder metal connecting rods and an assembled cast aluminum intake manifold.

The 3.0L, 226 hp (169 kW) V6 used in the Mondeo ST220 is called the Duratec ST. The 3.0L, 204 hp (152 kW) V6 in the Mondeo Titanium is called the Duratec SE.

There are two key versions of the Duratec 30:

- DAMB - The Jaguar AJ30 versions have direct-acting mechanical bucket (DAMB) tappets. Output is 240 hp (179 kW) at 6750 rpm with 220 lb⋅ft (298 N⋅m) of torque at 4500 rpm.
- RFF - The Taurus/Sable/Escape version used roller finger followers (RFF) instead and produced 201 hp (150 kW) at 5900 rpm with 207 lb⋅ft (281 N⋅m) of torque at 4400 rpm.

Applications include the Jaguar S-Type, Lincoln LS, Mazda MPV, Mazda6, Mondeo ST220, Ford Five Hundred, Ford Freestyle — and numerous other Ford vehicles.

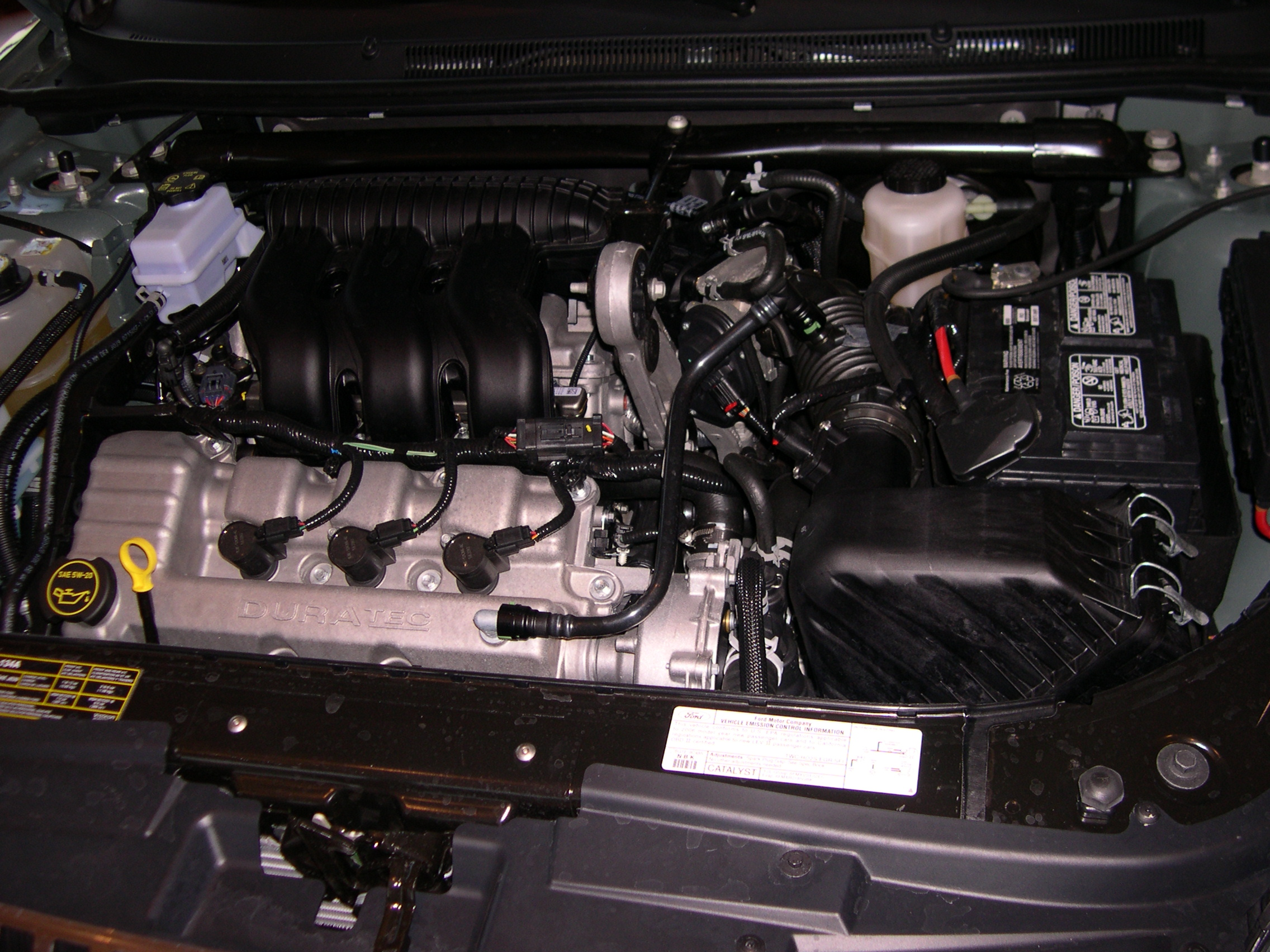
RFF engine in a 2006 Mercury Montego

Applications:

- 205 hp (153 kW)
  - 1996-2005 Ford Taurus/Mercury Sable
  - 2001-2005 Ford Escape/Mercury Mariner/Mazda Tribute
  - 2005-2007 Ford Five Hundred, Mercury Montego and Ford Freestyle

=== VCT ===
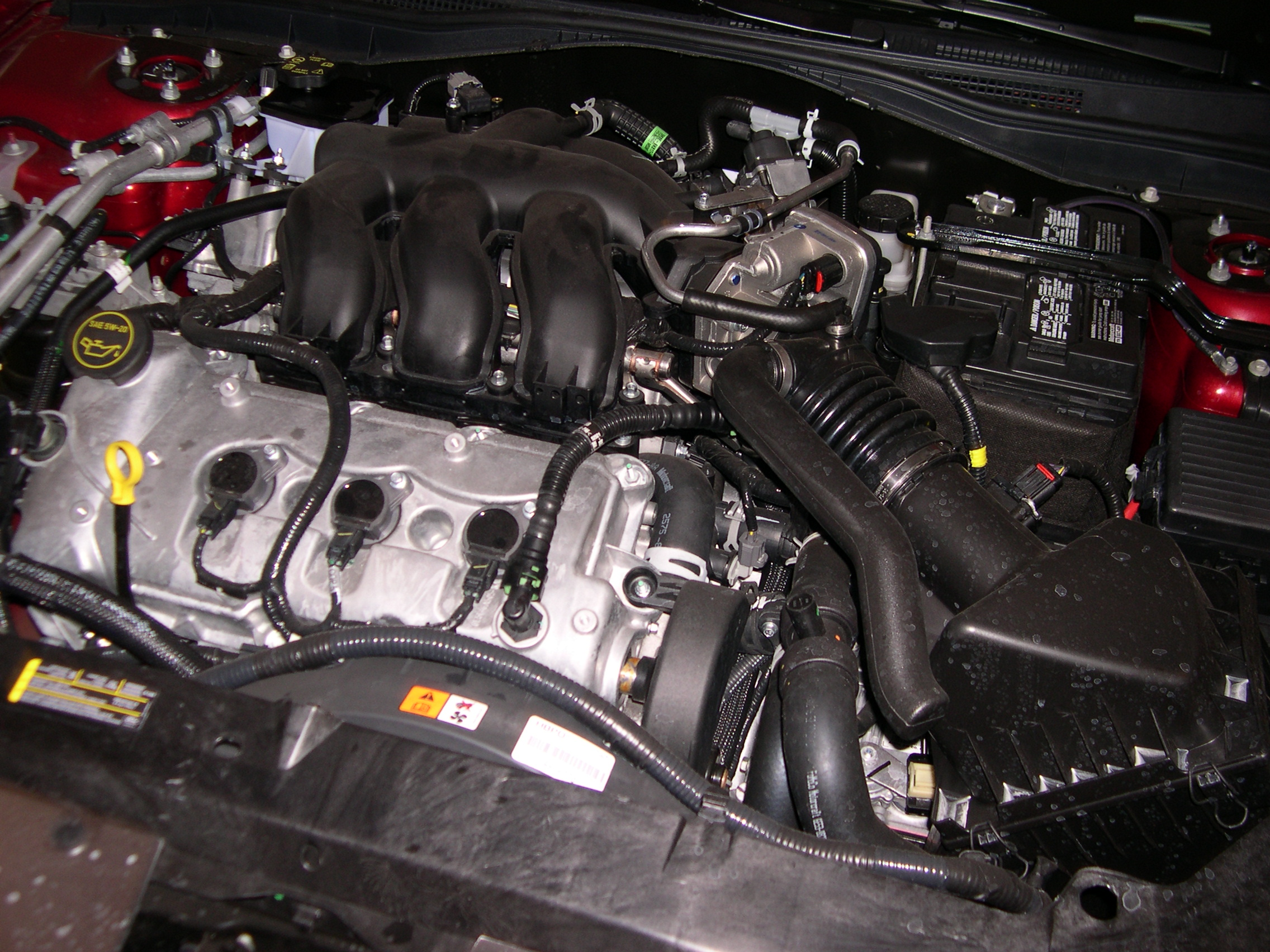
VVT engine in a 2006 Mercury Milan

The 2006 Ford Fusion, Mercury Milan, and Lincoln Zephyr feature a version of the Duratec 30 utilizing variable camshaft timing. The VCT is an RFF engine derived from the Mazda MZI and does not have the mechanical buckets as on the Lincoln LS version.

The engine has an output of 221 bhp (165 kW; 224 PS) at 6250 rpm, and 205 lb⋅ft (278 N⋅m) of torque at 4800 rpm.

In second generation of the engine, it is updated to run on E85. This version of the engine has an output of 240 bhp (179 kW; 243 PS) at 6550 rpm and 223 lb⋅ft (302 N⋅m) at 4300 rpm while running on 87 octane gasoline, and 250 bhp (186 kW; 253 PS) at 6250 rpm and 231 lb⋅ft (313 N⋅m) at 4150 rpm whilst running on E85. To achieve this, the engine now includes Cam Torque Actuated Variable Cam Timing developed with BorgWarner. Fuel saving features include adaptive knock control and aggressive deceleration fuel cutoff.

First generation

- 2006-2009 Ford Fusion
- 2006-2009 Mercury Milan
- 2006 Lincoln Zephyr
- 2003-2008 Mazda6

Second generation

- 2010-2012 Ford Fusion
- 2010-2011 Mercury Milan
- 2009-2012 Ford Escape
- 2009-2012 Mercury Mariner

=== Replacement ===
The Fusion later received the all new Duratec 35 V6 as an option to remain competitive with the Toyota Camry and Honda Accord. The older Duratec 30 remained as a step up from the base I4 in the Fusion, but the Milan kept the 3.0 L (2,967 cc) as its sole V6 until it was discontinued for the 2011 model year. Eventually, the Duratec 30 was discontinued in favor of the newer Duratec 35 and its variants.

== Other applications ==
A twin-turbocharged version of this engine is used in the Noble M400, a British sports car. The engine is rebuilt and tuned to a max power of 425 bhp (317 kW) at 6500 rpm, with a torque figure of 390 lb⋅ft (529 N⋅m) at 5000 rpm. Noble has used forged pistons, an oil cooler, a larger baffled oil sump and extra cooling ducts to maintain its durability. 29 L/100 km (8.1 mpg_{‑US}; 9.7 mpg_{‑imp}).

The 2015 Rossion Q1 is also powered by the Duratec V6, developing a maximum power of 508 bhp (515 PS; 379 kW) at 4700 rpm, with a torque figure of 521 lb⋅ft (706 N⋅m) at 4700 rpm. It has a weight-to-power ratio of 4.5 lb (2.0 kg)/hp. As with the Noble M400, the Q1 uses a 3.0 L; 181.1 cu in (2,967 cc) transversely-mounted, rear mid-engine, rear-wheel drive layout, twin-turbocharged engine.

Mazda's MZI version adds variable valve timing, as does Jaguar's AJ30. Note that the MZI name is also used in Europe on Mazda's version of the Ford Sigma I4. The 3.0 L (2,967 cc), 220.71 hp (165 kW) V6 used in the Mondeo ST220 is called Duratec ST. 3.0 L (2,967 cc) 204 hp (152 kW) V6 in the Mondeo Titanium is called Duratec SE. 28.1 mpg_{‑US} (8.4 L/100 km; 33.7 mpg_{‑imp})

A racing version of this engine exists and is used on mini prototypes like the Juno SS3 V6. It is a 3.0 L (2,967 cc) naturally aspirated non variable timing engines producing between 350 and 400 hp (261 and 298 kW) with a redline of around 8700 rpm. The engine has a 40-hour racing life span before it needs to be rebuilt with rings and bearings, and has proven very reliable and competitive. The engine has a Jaguar badge, and is branded as a Jaguar 3.0 litres (2,967 cc) V6 since it is built and mostly sold in the U.K.

== 3.4 L SHO V8 ==
Ford's 3.4 L SHO V8 is related to the 2.5 L Duratec V6. Each cylinder uses the same bore and stroke as the 2.5 L, but this engine was never officially referred to with the Duratec name.

== 5.9 L V12 ==
Ford's 5.9 L V12 version of its Duratec engine is used in the present Aston Martin lineup. It is equivalent to two 3.0 L (2,967 cc) Duratec V6s mated end to end, albeit with slightly larger main journals. The regular Aston Martin V12 uses roller rockers (RFF), and was designed by Ford and Cosworth. Cosworth assembled the V12 engines for a year before Aston Martin took over production. However, Cosworth still casts the heads and blocks. The variant used in the Aston Martin One-77 uses (DLC coated) DAMB cam followers like the later Duratec engines, and is built by Cosworth.

== See also ==
- Ford Duratec engine
- List of Ford engines
