= Mercury Milan =

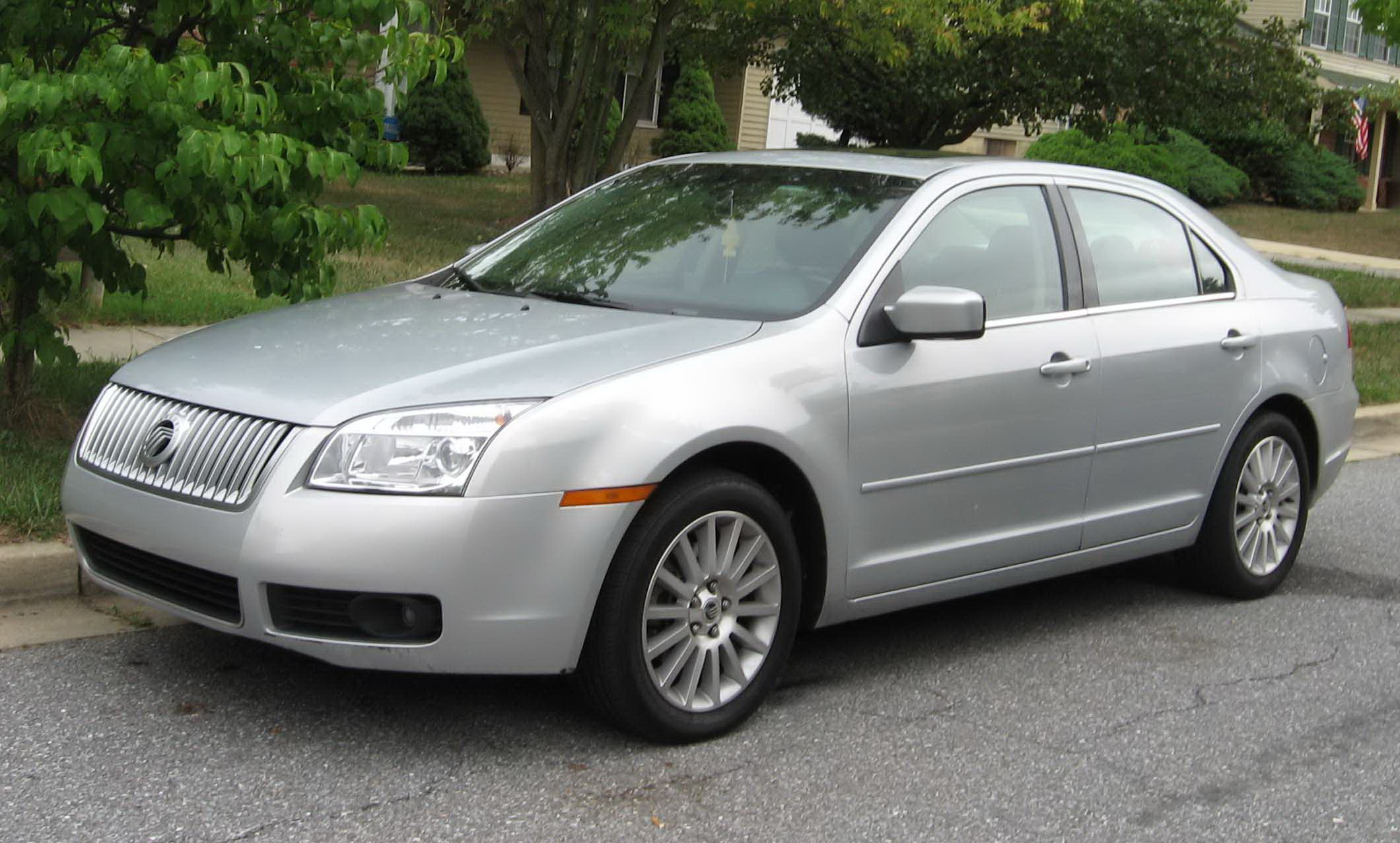
- 2006 Mercury Milan Premier

Overview
- Manufacturer: Mercury (Ford Motor Company)
- Production: August 1, 2005–December 17, 2010
- Model years: 2006–2011
- Assembly: Mexico: Hermosillo, Sonora (Hermosillo Stamping and Assembly)
- Designer: Darrell Behmer, Mercury Chief Designer

Body and chassis
- Class: Mid-size
- Body style: 4-door sedan
- Layout: FF layout All-wheel drive
- Platform: Ford CD3 platform
- Related: Ford Fusion; Lincoln Zephyr/MKZ; Mazda6

Powertrain
- Engine: Gasoline: 2.3 L Duratec 23 I4; 2.5 L Duratec 25 I4; 3.0 L Duratec 30 V6; Gasoline Hybrid: 2.5 L Duratec 25 I4
- Transmission: 5-speed Mazda G5M manual 6-speed Mazda G6M manual 5-speed Mazda FNR5 automatic 6-speed Aisin TF-80 automatic 6-speed Ford 6F35 automatic Aisin CVT

Dimensions
- Wheelbase: 107.4 in (2,728 mm)
- Length: 191.4 in (4,862 mm) (2006–2009); 189.0 in (4,801 mm) (2010)
- Width: 72.2 in (1,834 mm)
- Height: 2006: 55.8 in (1,417 mm); 2007–2010: 57.2 in (1,453 mm); Hybrid: 56.9 in (1,445 mm)

Chronology
- Predecessor: Mercury Sable (mid-size)

The Mercury Milan is a four-door, five passenger, front and all-wheel drive mid-size sedan manufactured by Ford and marketed by its Mercury division over a single generation from 2006 to 2011, using Ford's CD3 platform.

As a rebadged variant of the first-generation Ford Fusion and Lincoln MKZ/Zephyr, the Milan received an extensive mid-cycle refresh (i.e., facelift) for 2010 under Chief Designer Darrell Behmer and Design Director Peter Horbury.

Manufactured alongside the Ford Fusion and Lincoln MKZ/Zephyr at Hermosillo Assembly in Mexico, it served as the entry-level and smallest Mercury, succeeding the Mercury Mystique as well as replacing the Sable. It was marketed in the United States (including Puerto Rico and the U.S. Virgin Islands), Mexico, and the Middle East.

It was introduced at the 2005 Chicago Auto Show, and in 2008, the Milan became Mercury's best-selling model. Coinciding with Ford's retirement of Mercury, sales of the Milan ended after a shortened 2011 model year with the final vehicle was manufactured on December 17, 2010.

The nameplate Milan derived from second-largest Italian city, Milan, often associated with fashion and design. Chief Designer, Darrell Behmer, said the "name 'Milan' connotes visions of a modern, fashionable European city, fitting the car's design theme and target customer like a fine Italian suit."

== Features ==
Mercury marketed the Milan in base and Premium trims. Base models were equipped with 16" alloy wheels, cloth bucket seats with 6-way power driver with manual lumbar, seatback map pockets, spring-assisted 60/40 split rear bench seat w/center armrest, two cupholders, two-tired front center console with two-tired storage, tilt/telescopic steering wheel with speed control and secondary audio controls, instrument cluster with message center, tachometer, turn signal outage, low oil pressure, fuel cap, door/decklid/hood ajar, delayed accessory power shut-off, power windows with driver one-touch down, lockout switch and accessory delay; power door locks; remote keyless entry; remote trunk release; speed control with steering wheel mounted controls; passive anti-theft system; single zone air conditioning; rear window defroster; AM/FM stereo with CD/MP3 player and 6 speakers; in-glass antenna; auxiliary power outlet; analog clock; front door storage pockets; overhead console with sunglass holder, front dome lamp with maplights; rear dome lamp & maplights; two front and two rear assist handles; grocery bag hooks; illuminated entry and illuminated visor vanity mirrors.

The Premier trim level included a six-disc CD changer with MP3 and six speakers, leather seating surfaces, anti-lock brakes, and 17-inch machined aluminum wheels. An optional "Comfort Package" includes a leather-wrapped steering wheel with secondary audio, speed and climate controls, automatic electronic climate control, auto headlamps, fog lamps, puddle lamps, and an auto dimming interior rearview mirror with compass. Other options available on the Premier trim included traction assist, heated seats, power moonroof, the Audiophile AM/FM CDx6/MP3 player with eight speakers, and mahogany applique interior trim.

All models included LED tail lamps and split fold down rear seats, operated from twin trunk-mounted controls accessible from a standing position — as well as a folding front-passenger seat, enabling the transport of items up to 9' in length.

Beginning with the 2010 model year, the Milan (along with badge-engineered variants, the Ford Fusion and the Lincoln MKZ — and their hybrid variants) used an acoustic glass for the front windscreen and rear lite. Marketed as Carlite SoundScreen, the glass used a sheet of acoustic vinyl between two layers of glass to reduce noise levels by as much as 6 dB at certain frequencies and 2 to 3 dB overall, enabling more intelligible in-car conversation. The polyvinyl butyral (PVB) layer could save up to seven pounds per vehicle, and helped cut the vibration noise stemming from the vehicle's engine compartment.

The base and Premier trims offered the 160 horsepower 2.3- liter Duratec 23 PZEV I-4 with five-speed manual or optional five-speed automatic transmission — or the 221 horsepower 3.0-liter Duratec 30 V-6 engine with advanced six-speed automatic transmission.

=== Platform ===
The Milan used the Ford CD3 platform; a variant of the Mazda GG platform shared with the first-generation Ford Fusion, Lincoln Zephyr/MKZ, Ford Edge and Lincoln MKX. Using a steel unibody, the CD3 platform is equipped with front-wheel drive. In 2007, all-wheel drive became optional on V6-equipped models. In front, the chassis uses a short-long arm (SLA) double wishbone front suspension and an independent multi-link twist blade rear suspension with front and rear stabilizer bars.

==== Powertrain ====
The Milan shared its powertrain with the Ford Fusion. From 2006 to 2009, a 160 hp, 2.3 L, inline-four was standard, replaced by a 175 hp, 2.5 L, inline-four for 2010. A 221 hp, 3.0 L V6 was optional, with output increased to 240 hp in 2010. The Milan did not receive a counterpart of the Ford Fusion Sport, powered by a 3.5 L V6.

The four-cylinder engine was equipped with a five-speed manual transmission as standard (the first manual-transmission Mercury sedan since the 2000 Mystique), with a five-speed automatic as an option. Through its entire production, the V6 was offered solely with a six-speed automatic transmission (shared with the Fusion and Montego). For 2010, the four-cylinder engines were updated with six-speed manual and six-speed automatic transmissions; the six-speed automatic on V6 engines was equipped for manually controlled shifting ("Select Shift").

Engine	Years	Power	Torque	Transmission	Fuel consumption City/Hwy
2.3 L Duratec I4	2006–2009	160 hp (119 kW) @ 6250 rpm	156 lb⋅ft (212 N⋅m) @ 4250 rpm	5-speed G5M manual	20 mpg_{‑US} (12 L/100 km; 24 mpg_{‑imp}); 29 mpg_{‑US} (8.1 L/100 km; 35 mpg_{‑imp})
2.3 L Duratec I4	2006–2009	160 hp (119 kW) @ 6250 rpm	156 lb⋅ft (212 N⋅m) @ 4250 rpm	5-speed FNR5 automatic	20 mpg_{‑US} (12 L/100 km; 24 mpg_{‑imp}); 28 mpg_{‑US} (8.4 L/100 km; 34 mpg_{‑imp})
2.5 L Duratec I4	2010–2011	175 hp (130 kW) @ 6000 rpm	172 lb⋅ft (233 N⋅m) @ 4500 rpm	6-speed G6M manual	22 mpg_{‑US} (11 L/100 km; 26 mpg_{‑imp}); 31 mpg_{‑US} (7.6 L/100 km; 37 mpg_{‑imp})
2.5 L Duratec I4	2010–2011	175 hp (130 kW) @ 6000 rpm	172 lb⋅ft (233 N⋅m) @ 4500 rpm	6-speed 6F35 automatic	23 mpg_{‑US} (10 L/100 km; 28 mpg_{‑imp}); 34 mpg_{‑US} (6.9 L/100 km; 41 mpg_{‑imp}) (16" wheels); 22 mpg_{‑US} (11 L/100 km; 26 mpg_{‑imp}); 31 mpg_{‑US} (7.6 L/100 km; 37 mpg_{‑imp}) (17" wheels)
2.5 L Duratec I4 Atkinson cycle (Hybrid)	2010–2011	156 hp (116 kW) @ 6000 rpm	136 lb⋅ft (184 N⋅m) @ 2250 rpm	Aisin CVT	41 mpg_{‑US} (5.7 L/100 km; 49 mpg_{‑imp}); 36 mpg_{‑US} (6.5 L/100 km; 43 mpg_{‑imp})
3.0 L Duratec V6; FWD	2006–2009	221 hp (165 kW) @ 6250 rpm	205 lb⋅ft (278 N⋅m) @ 4800 rpm	6-speed TF-80 automatic	18 mpg_{‑US} (13 L/100 km; 22 mpg_{‑imp}); 26 mpg_{‑US} (9.0 L/100 km; 31 mpg_{‑imp})
3.0 L Duratec V6; AWD	2006–2009	221 hp (165 kW) @ 6250 rpm	205 lb⋅ft (278 N⋅m) @ 4800 rpm	6-speed TF-80 automatic	17 mpg_{‑US} (14 L/100 km; 20 mpg_{‑imp}); 25 mpg_{‑US} (9.4 L/100 km; 30 mpg_{‑imp})
3.0 L Duratec V6; FWD	2010–2011	240 hp (179 kW) @ 6550 rpm (165 kW)	223 lb⋅ft (302 N⋅m) @ 4300 rpm	6-speed 6F35 automatic	18 mpg_{‑US} (13 L/100 km; 22 mpg_{‑imp}); 27 mpg_{‑US} (8.7 L/100 km; 32 mpg_{‑imp})
3.0 L Duratec V6; AWD	2010–2011	240 hp (179 kW) @ 6550 rpm (165 kW)	223 lb⋅ft (302 N⋅m) @ 4300 rpm	6-speed 6F35 automatic	18 mpg_{‑US} (13 L/100 km; 22 mpg_{‑imp}); 25 mpg_{‑US} (9.4 L/100 km; 30 mpg_{‑imp})

=== Body ===
As a rebadged variant of the Ford Fusion, the Milan featured its own front and rear fascias, along with a waterfall-style grille recalling the Monterey and Montego — as well as projector headlamps, LED taillamps (extending into the trunklid), a bumper-mounted license plate and faux matte-silver or imitation wood trim

2007 changes included MILAN badging to the front doors and revised interior panels providing improved side-impact protection along with an improvement in safety ratings from the Insurance Institute for Highway Safety. As a running change, a DVD-based navigation system became optional along with a console-mounted MP3 auxiliary jack.

Presented at the 2008 Los Angeles Auto Show, the Milan received mid-cycle revisions for the 2010 model year alongside the Fusion and MKZ, including revised tail lamps and an enlarged grille, reshaped headlamps and revised front fascia. The interior received a revised instrument panel. While not the first hybrid offered by Mercury, the 2010 Milan Hybrid marked the first Mercury hybrid offered as a sedan.

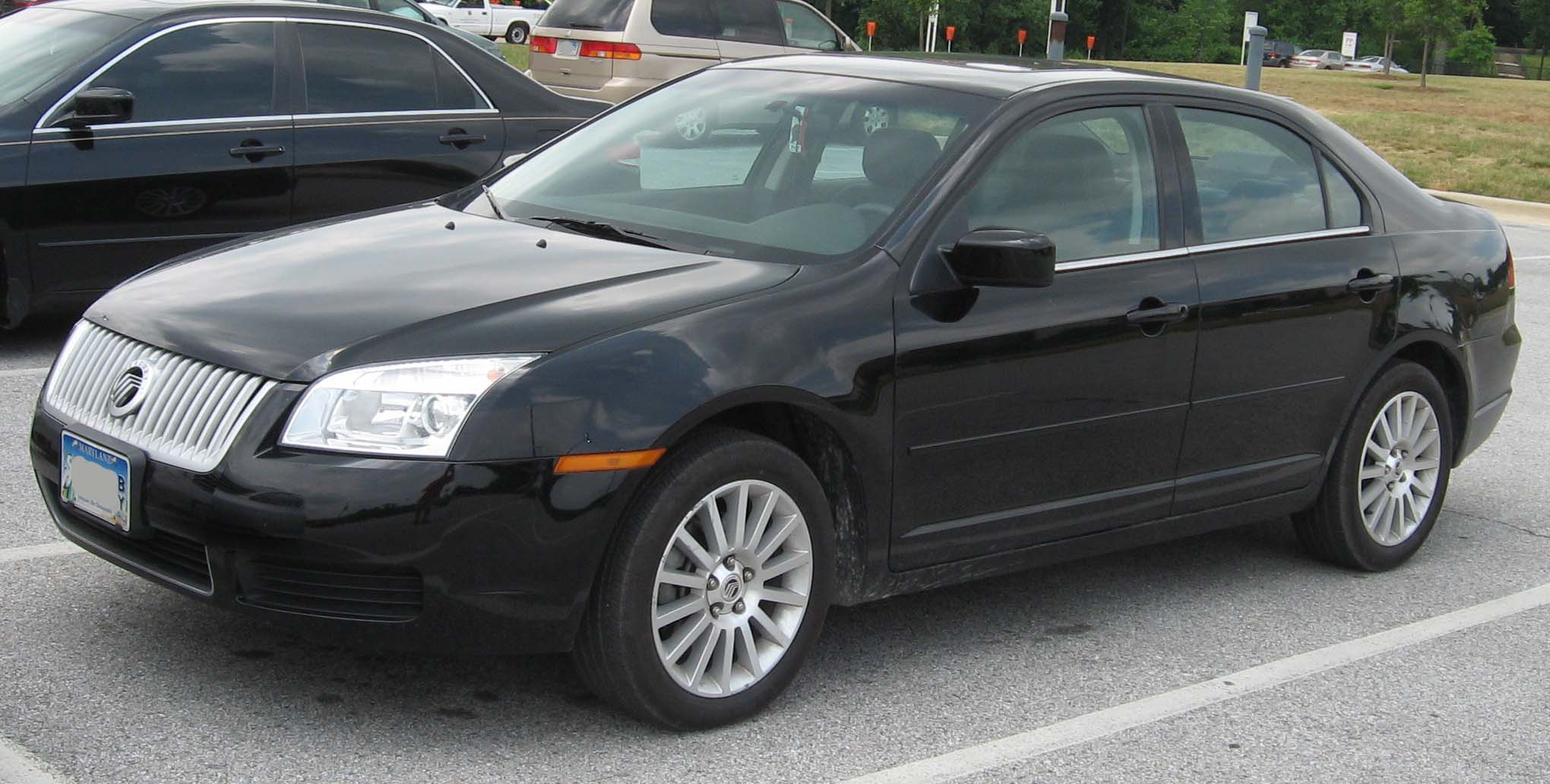
2006 Mercury Milan Premier

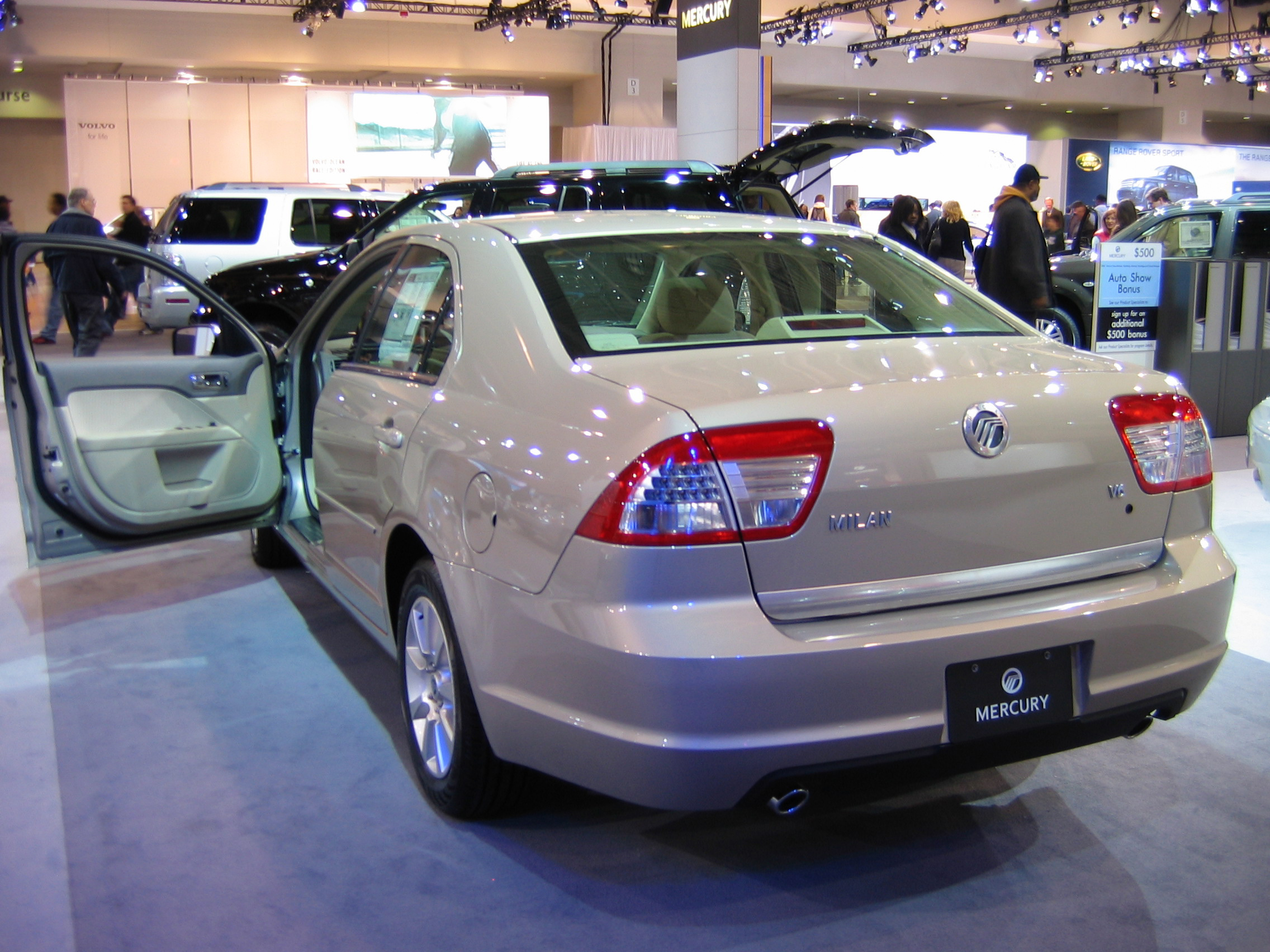
2006–2009 Mercury Milan

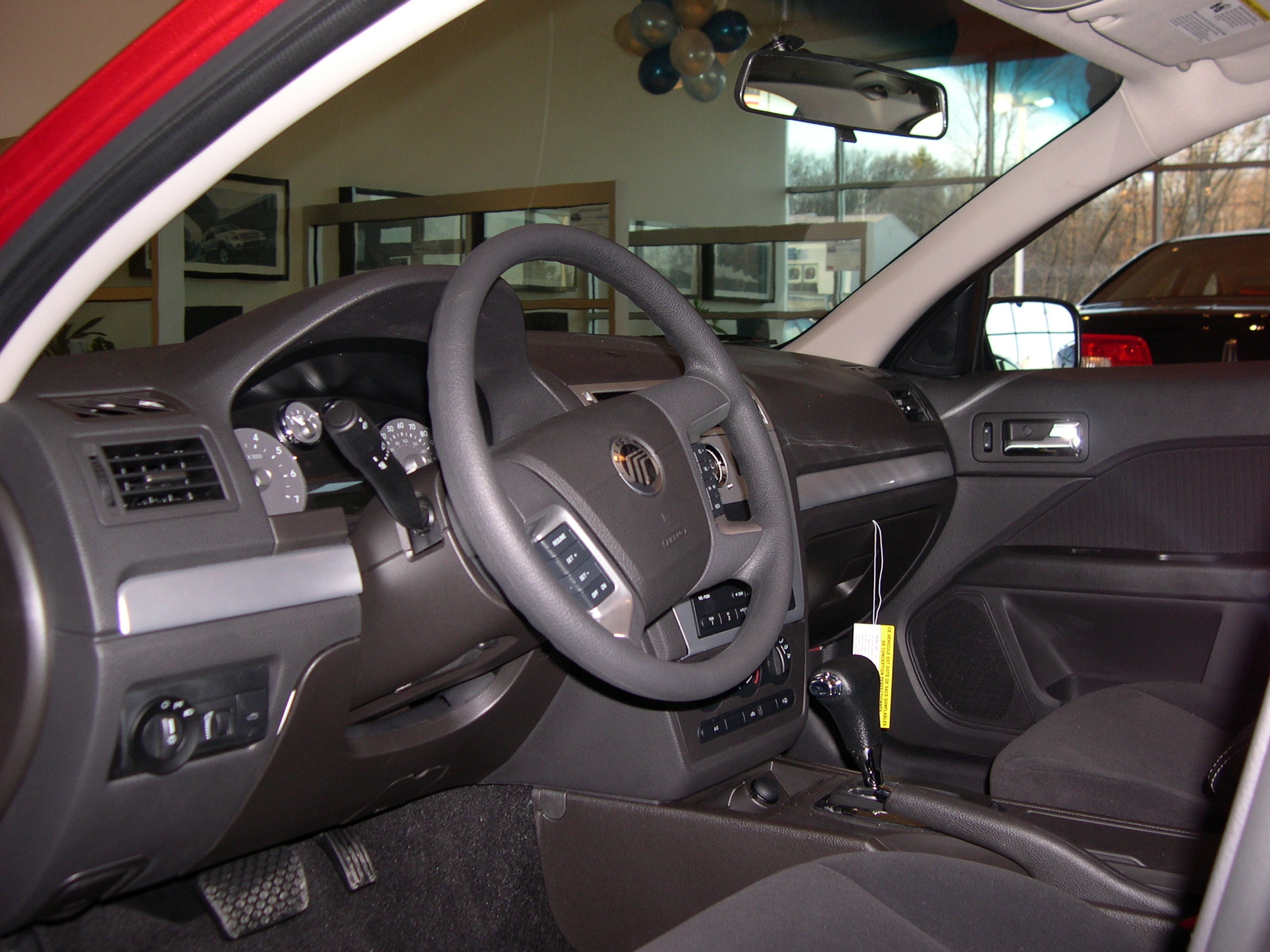
2006 Mercury Milan interior

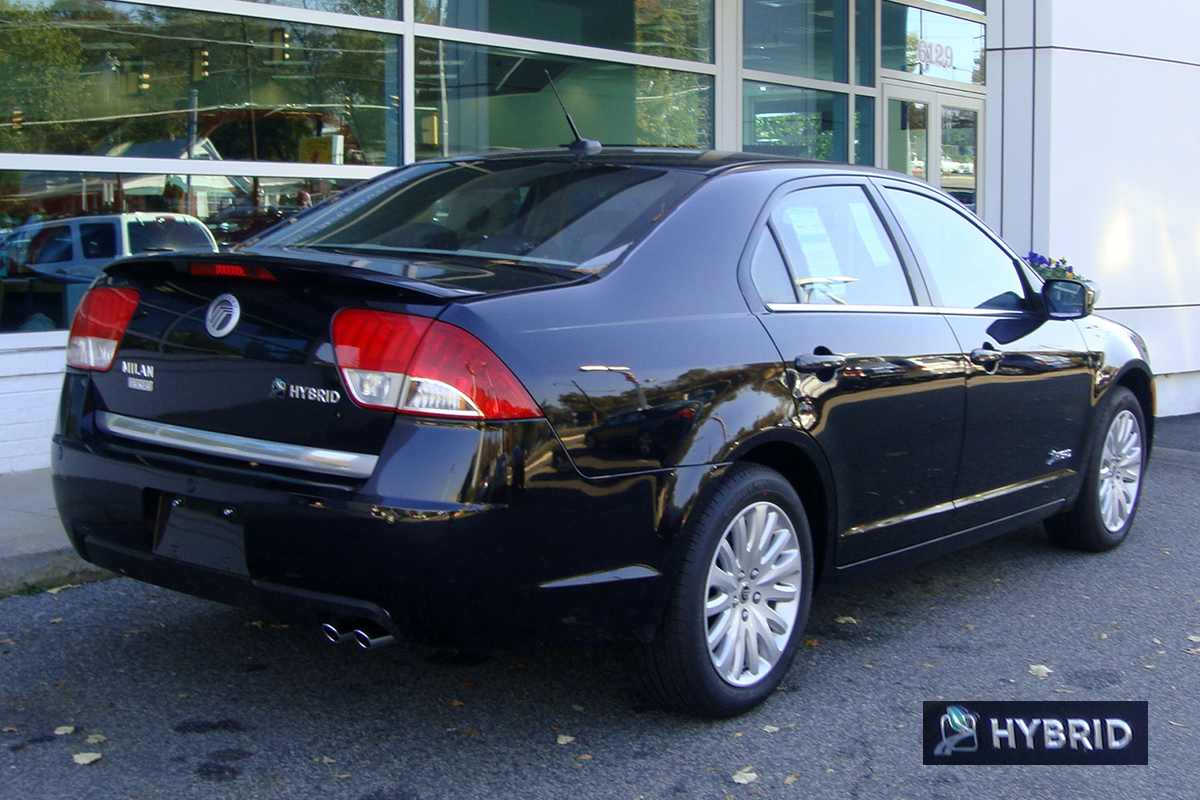
2010 Mercury Milan Hybrid

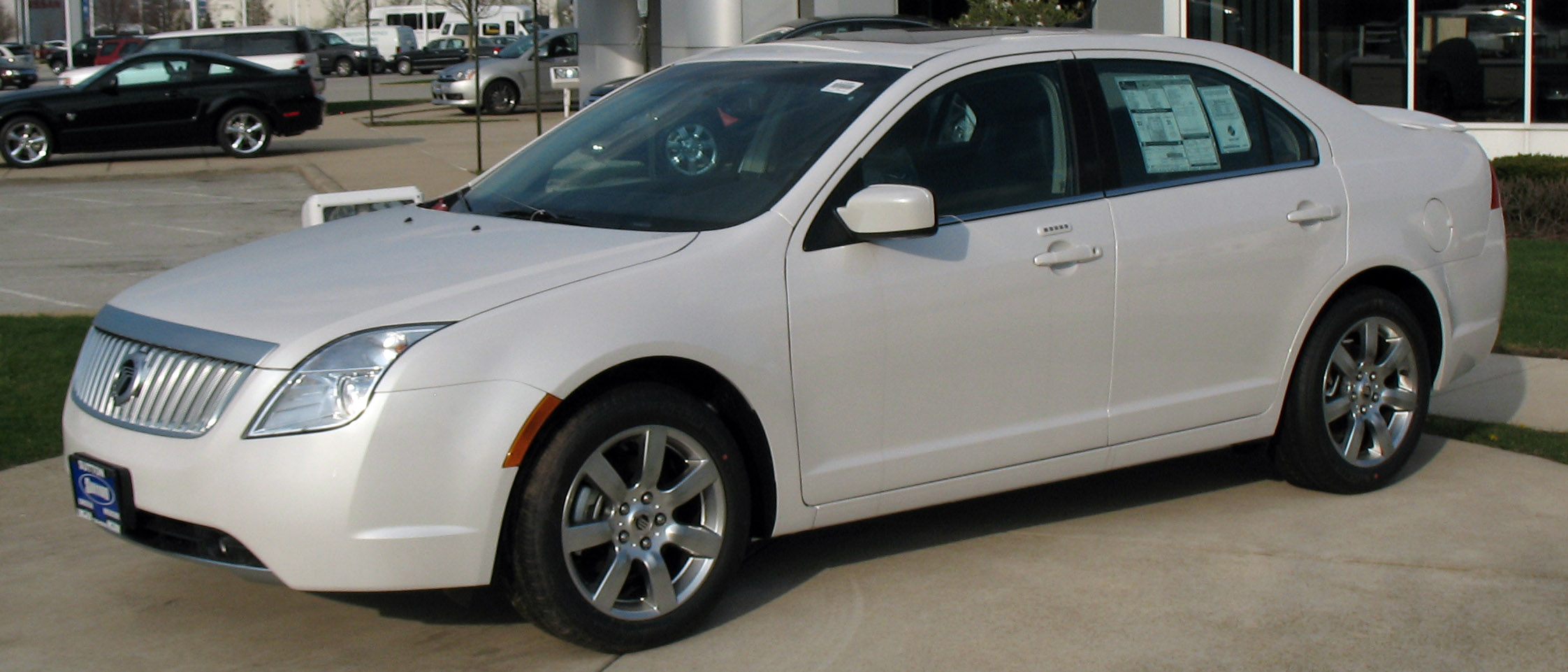
2010 Mercury Milan Premier

=== Trim ===
The Milan was marketed in six different trim levels, dependent on drivetrain configuration. The base trim levels were I4 and V6; top trim were I4 Premier and V6 Premier; V6 AWD or V6 Premier AWD.

For 2009, Mercury introduced an optional VOGA special-edition appearance package, its name coined in-house at Ford, with bespoke white leather seats embroidered with the VOGA typeface, exterior badging, floor mats, faux carbon interior appliques and 17" 8-spoke chrome wheels.

=== Safety ===
Tests on the 2010 Milan were conducted by NCAP (New Car Assessment Program).

Test's	Rating
Frontal Driver Rating	5/5 stars
Side Drive Rating	5/5 stars
Side Rear Passenger Rating	5/5 stars
Side Rear Passenger Rating	4/5 stars
Rollover 2 Wheel Drive Rating	4/5 stars
Rollover 4 Wheel Drive Rating	5/5 stars

== Mercury Milan Hybrid ==
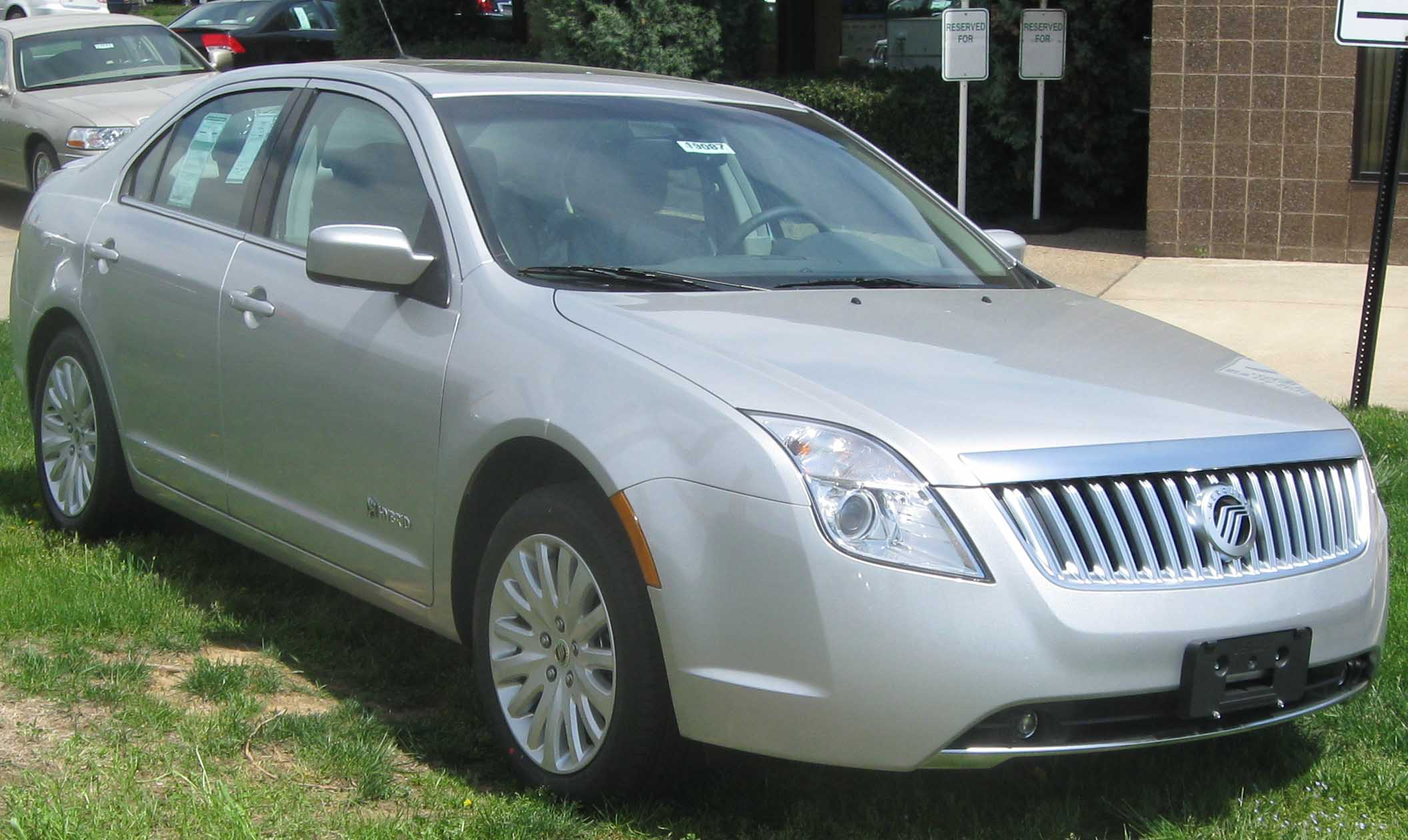
2010 Mercury Milan Hybrid

In March 2009, the 2010 Mercury Milan Hybrid was introduced with the Ford Fusion Hybrid to the US market. The powertrain consists of a 156 hp Atkinson-cycle variant of the Duratec 25 gasoline engine, 106-horsepower AC synchronous electric motor, and an Aisin-produced continuously variable transmission. When driving on electric-only mode (EV mode) the Fusion can achieve 47 mph and up to 2 miles of continuous EV driving. In city driving a full tank of fuel delivers 700 miles (1,126.5 km). U.S. Environmental Protection Agency (EPA) ratings for the Milan and Fusion hybrid versions are 41 miles per US gallon (5.7 L/100 km; 49 mpg_{‑imp}) for city and 36 miles per US gallon (6.5 L/100 km; 43 mpg_{‑imp}) for highway.

Ford set a modest sales target of about 25,000 vehicles a year for the Fusion and Milan hybrids. 2,884 Milan Hybrids were sold.

== Sales ==
Calendar Year	American sales
2005	5,321
2006	35,853
2007	37,244
2008	31,393
2009	27,403
2010	28,912

== Awards ==
- In November 2006 Consumer Reports ranked the Milan among the most reliable family cars available in the U.S.
- Milan won Auto Pacific's 2006 Vehicle Satisfaction Award for midsize cars.
- First six speed automatic transmission in the medium car class.
- 2007 Consumer Guide Recommended Mid-size Car
- 2007 J.D. Power & Associates Initial Quality Winner, Midsize Car Category
- 2007 Second Quarter U.S. Global Quality Research System study, 2nd place
- 2008 & 2009 lowest TGW ("things gone wrong") in midsize car category (analysis by RDA Group)
