= Ford Fusion (Americas) =

Mid-size cars by Ford (2006–2020)

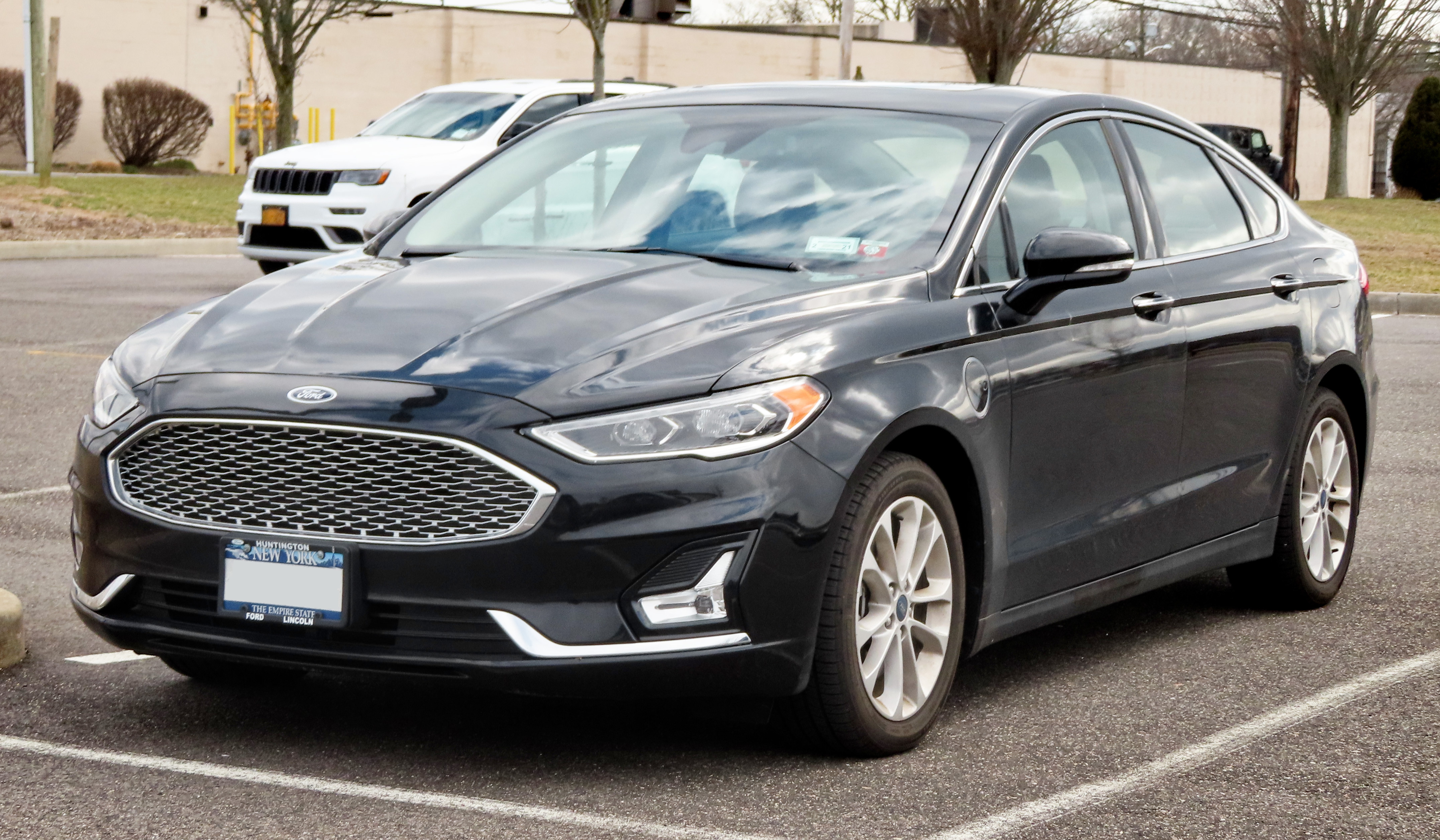
- Ford Fusion Titanium Energi

Overview
- Manufacturer: Ford
- Also called: Ford Mondeo (Europe and Latin America, 2014–2022)
- Production: August 2005 – July 2020
- Model years: 2006–2020

Body and chassis
- Class: Mid-size car (D)
- Body style: 4-door sedan
- Layout: Front-engine, front-wheel-drive or all-wheel-drive

Chronology
- Predecessor: Ford Contour and Ford Taurus (fourth generation)

The Ford Fusion is a mid-size car that was manufactured and marketed by the Ford Motor Company. From the 2006 through 2020 model years, two generations of the Fusion have been produced in gasoline, gas/electric hybrid, and gas/plug-in electric hybrid variants. The Fusion was manufactured at Ford's Hermosillo Stamping and Assembly plant in Sonora, Mexico, alongside the Lincoln MKZ, and formerly the Mercury Milan, both of which share its CD3 platform.

Production on the first Fusions began on August 1, 2005. The Fusion replaced the Mondeo for the Latin American markets, except in Argentina (where the current European Mondeo is available); in the United States and Canada it superseded the then mid-size Taurus and the compact Contour. The Fusion is positioned between the compact Ford Focus and the full-size Ford Taurus. In the Middle East, this model is sold alongside the Mondeo. Versions sold there are available only with the 2.5-liter engine. Unlike in the United States, Canada, and Latin America, no V6 engine is available in that region. The same is true in South Korea, where only the 2.5-liter engines (including those for the hybrid model) are available as of the 2012 model year.

The second generation line-up includes a gasoline engine option, an EcoBoost engine option, a next-generation hybrid model, and a plug-in hybrid version, the Ford Fusion Energi, making the Ford Fusion the first production sedan to offer these four options. Sales of the gasoline-powered and hybrid versions began in the U.S. in October 2012 under the 2013 model. Sales in Europe and Asia as Ford Mondeo began in 2015, along with South Africa, where the Fusion name was used. Deliveries of the Fusion Energi began in the U.S. in February 2013. The entire 2013 Fusion line-up was awarded with the 2013 Green Car of the Year at the 2012 Los Angeles Auto Show. In 2019, the Fusion was the seventh-best selling car in the United States.

== First generation (2006) ==
First generation
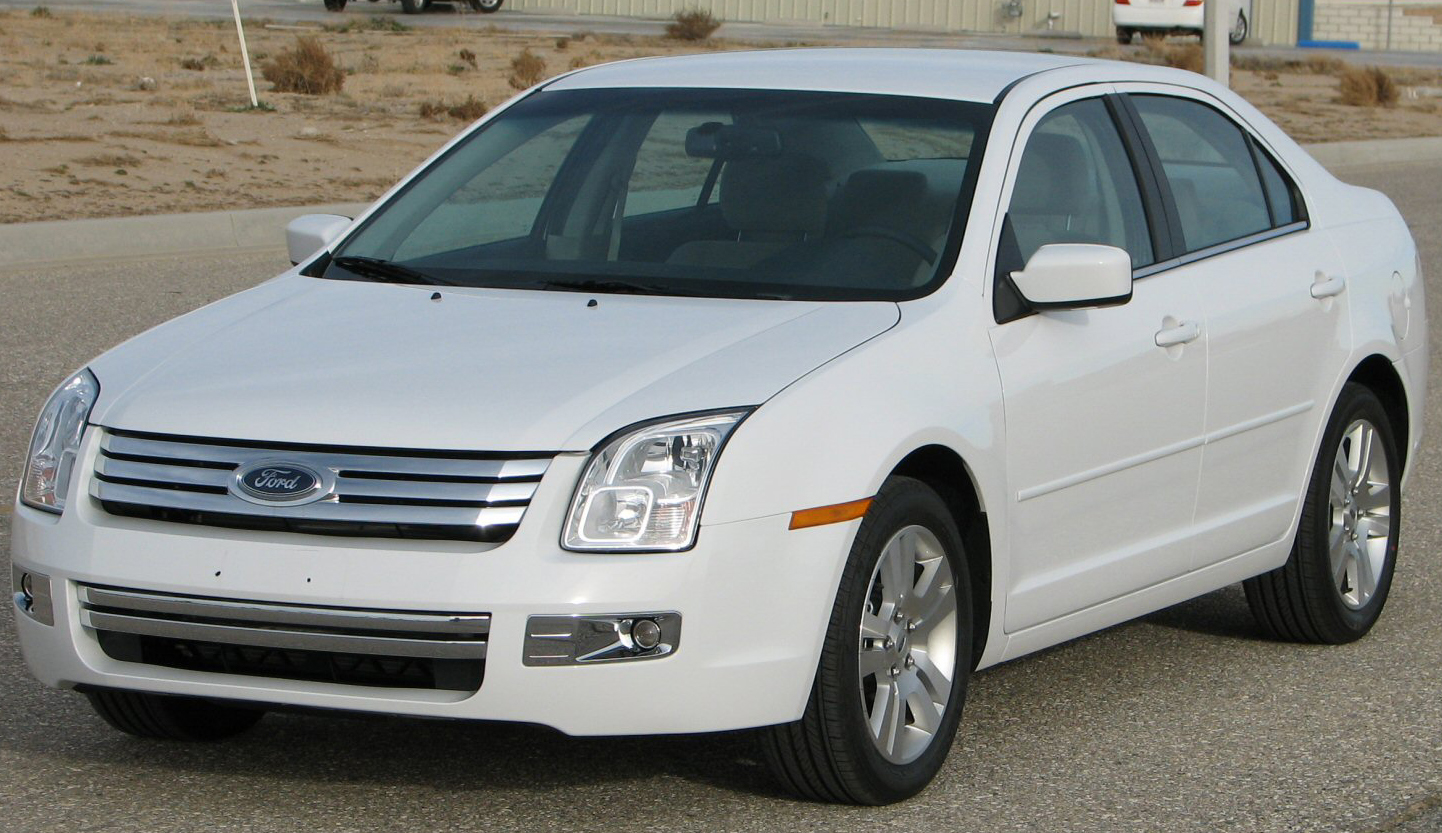

Overview
- Production: August 2005–2012
- Model years: 2006–2012
- Assembly: Mexico: Hermosillo, Sonora (Hermosillo Stamping and Assembly)
- Designer: Darrell Behmer, Chief Designer (2010 Facelift)

Body and chassis
- Platform: Ford CD3 platform
- Related: Lincoln MKZ; Mazda6; Mercury Milan

Powertrain
- Engine: Gasoline: 2.3 L Duratec 23 I4; 2.5 L Duratec 25 I4; 3.0 L Duratec 30 V6; 3.5 L Duratec 35 V6; Gasoline Hybrid: 2.5 L Duratec 25 I4
- Transmission: 5-speed Mazda G5M manual (2.3L I4); 5-speed Mazda FNR5 automatic (2.3L I4); 6-speed Mazda G6M manual (2.5L I4); 6-speed Ford 6F35 automatic (2.5L I4 & 2010–2012 3.0L V6); 6-speed Aisin TF-80/AWF21 automatic (2006–2009 3.0L V6 & 3.5L V6, 2010-2012 Sport 3.5L V6); Continuous variable transmission (hybrid)

Dimensions
- Wheelbase: 107.4 in (2,728 mm)
- Length: 2006–09: 190.2 in (4,831 mm); 2010–12: 190.6 in (4,841 mm)
- Width: 72.2 in (1,834 mm)
- Height: 2006–09: 57.2 in (1,453 mm); 2010–12: 56.9 in (1,445 mm)
- Curb weight: 3,280 lb (1,488 kg)

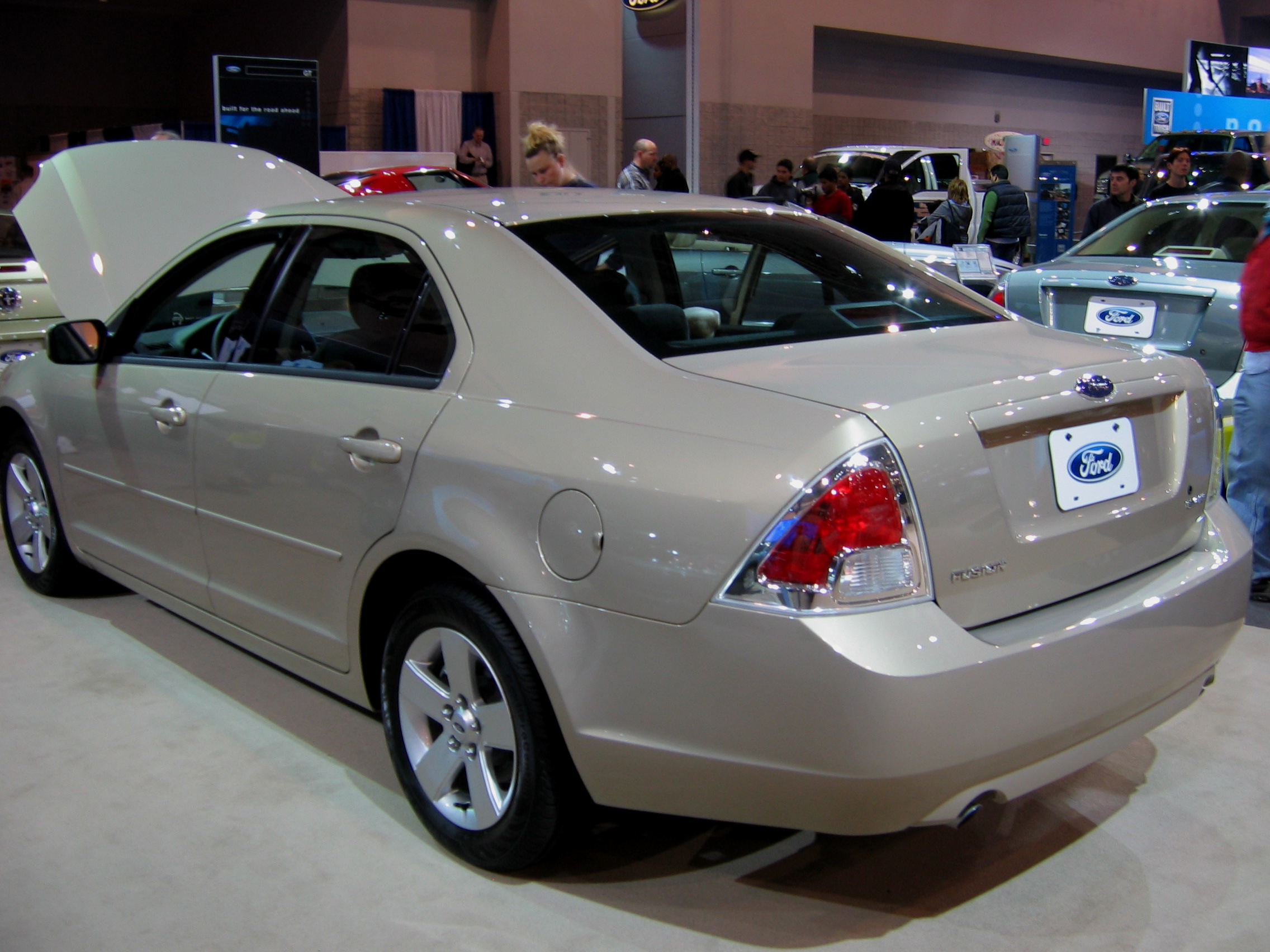
Ford Fusion (US; pre-facelift)

The Fusion used Ford's CD3 platform, originally designed by Mazda as its G platform, its wheelbase stretched by 5 cm and width extended by 5.5 cm. The Fusion was the first production car to use Ford's three-bar grille.

Available in S, SE, and SEL trims, the standard engine on each was the 160 hp (119 kW) Mazda-designed 2.3 L Duratec 23 I4, paired with either a 5-speed manual or 5-speed automatic transmission, both also designed by Mazda. SE and SEL models were also available with a 221 hp (165 kW) 3.0 L Duratec 30 V6 and a 6-speed automatic made by Aisin Japan. The Fusion shared some interior parts with the otherwise-unrelated European Mk III Ford Mondeo, such as part of the console and the seats.

Ford's early advertising campaign for the Fusion in the United States used the tagline, "Life in Drive", in the U.S. and "Create a Reaction," in Canada. In January 2007, the company launched a new campaign for the Fusion with the tagline "Fusion Challenge" (later, "Ford Challenge"). The American Ford Fusion emerged the winner over the Toyota Camry and Honda Accord based on the attributes of styling, reliability from Consumer Reports, handling, and "fun to drive" in head-to-head comparison tests with the Japanese sedans performed by subscribers of Car and Driver and Road & Track magazines in the Washington, D.C., and Los Angeles regions.

In July 2007, Motor Trend reported that Ford's Special Vehicle Team tuner group planned to release a Fusion GT in late 2009 or early 2010. Its 3.5-liter Eco-Boost V-6 would make about 340 horsepower. No such vehicle ever came to fruition.

=== Features and model year changes ===
For 2007, all-wheel-drive became available on V6 models. Sirius Satellite Radio became available as an option on the SE and SEL trims. The front passenger fold-flat seat was introduced and became standard on the SEL and SE trims. The Fusion gained front-seat side airbags, a side air curtain, and a perimeter alarm as standard features, all of which had previously been available as cost options. An auxiliary input jack became stand equipment and a DVD-based navigation system became optional.

For the 2008 model year, ABS and tire pressure monitoring became standard features. New optional features included rear parking assist, Ford's SYNC multimedia and communication system, and ambient interior lighting. The DVD navigation was replaced with a new generation system featuring voice commands, and for the first time navigation was available with manual transmission. Several colors were removed and some others added.

Two new packages were added to the options list for 2008:

- Sport Appearance Package, which included such interior and exterior improvements as 18-inch machined aluminum wheels, a rear spoiler, stiffer suspension, body-color fog lamp surrounds, smoke-colored grille, red seat inserts, and red stitching on leather surfaces.
- Moon and Tune, which included a power moonroof and a premium eight-speaker Audiophile sound system with amplifier.

For 2009, electronic stability control was added as an option. A new appearance package with blue trim became available, and revisions were made to the exterior color palette.

=== Trim levels ===
For 2006–2009:

- The S was the base model, including the 2.3L Duratec I4 engine, with either an automatic or manual transmission available, an AM/FM stereo with single-disc CD player and four speakers plus an auxiliary audio input jack (2007–2009), sixteen-inch steel wheels with plastic wheel covers, cloth seating surfaces, and keyless entry.
- The SE was the step-up model, adding sixteen inch alloy wheels, AM/FM stereo with single-disc CD/MP3 player, power front driver's seat, and a security system.
- The SEL was the top-of-the-line model, seventeen inch aluminum wheels, adding power dual front seats and later offering a standard Ford SYNC system.

In Mexico the Fusion was offered in two trim levels through 2005–06: SE and SEL, with automatic transmission only. For the 2007 model year, the S trim was introduced and a manual transmission was newly available for the S and SE trim levels. These two trims had standard 16-inch alloy wheels (Steel rims were not offered on any Mexican trim even on the S trim that offered them in the US. ), while the SEL trim had 17-inch alloy wheels standard (just like the US models). The 2008 model year added Ford's Ford SYNC to the SEL trim. The manual transmission was discontinued after 2008 in Mexico due to poor sales. The 2009 model year was a very short one in Mexico because the 2010 Fusion arrived in dealerships by late February 2009.

=== Engines ===
Engine	Power	Torque
2.3 L (138 cu in) Duratec 23	160 hp (119 kW; 162 PS) @6250rpm	155 lb⋅ft (210 N⋅m) @4250rpm
3.0 L (181 cu in) Duratec 30 V6	221 hp (165 kW; 224 PS) @6250rpm	205 lb⋅ft (278 N⋅m) @4800rpm

=== Crash testing ===
National Highway Traffic Safety Administration:

- Frontal Driver (2006, 07, 08 early release):
- Frontal Driver (2008 later release, 2009):
- Frontal Passenger (2006, 07, 08 early release):
- Frontal Passenger (2008 later release, 2009):
- Side Driver (no side airbag, 2006 only):
- Side Driver (side airbag):
- Side Rear Passenger (no side airbag, 2006 only):
- Side Rear Passenger (side airbag):
- Rollover FWD:
- Rollover AWD:

Insurance Institute for Highway Safety:

- Frontal Offset (2006, 07 early release): Acceptable
- Frontal Offset (2007 later release, 08–09): Good
- Side Impact (no side airbag, 2006 only): Poor
- Side Impact (side airbag 2006, 07 early release): Acceptable
- Side Impact (2007 later release, 08–present): Good
- Roof Strength (2005–10 mfg before May 2010): Acceptable
- Roof Strength (2010 mfg after April 2010–2012): Good

Although the frontal offset test for 2007 (later release) to 2009 is rated good overall by IIHS, injury measures from head/neck and right leg/foot is rated acceptable.

=== 2010 refresh ===
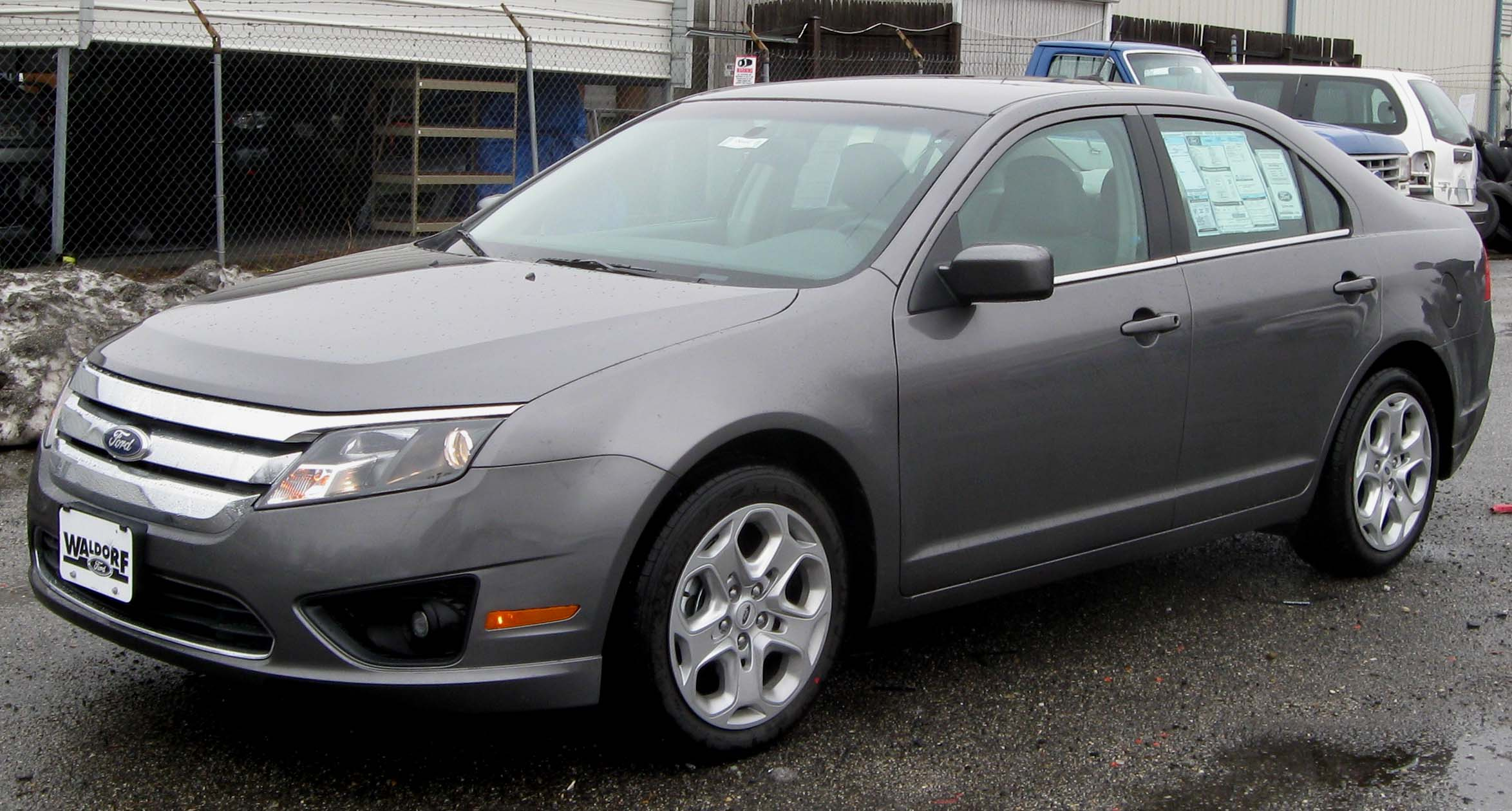
2010 facelift

For the 2010 model year, Ford facelifted the Fusion, extensively, along with its badge engineered variants, the Mercury Milan and Lincoln MKZ, – under Chief Designer Darrell Behmer.

Retaining the roof and doors of the earlier iterations, the mid-cycle refresh featured revised front and rear end fascias, interior and powertrain. Powertrain options are similar to those that debuted on the 2009 Ford Escape, including the new 2.5 L I4 and 3.0 L PIP Duratec series V6 engine coupled to Ford's new 6F35 six-speed transmission. The 3.0 L Duratec provided 240 hp (179 kW) with E85 fuel capability, while the I4 provided 175 hp (130 kW). The 3.5 L Duratec 35 producing 263 hp (196 kW) was standard in the Fusion Sport. The I4 and 3.0 L V6 engines included adaptive knock control and aggressive deceleration fuel cutoff features to improve fuel economy. Interior changes included a new optional 8" screen navigation control system, a new center console design, and Ford's new trademark "Ice Blue" illumination for the controls and gauges that is shared with the Ford Focus and Ford F-150.

Beginning with the 2010 model year, the Fusion (alongside its badge-engineered variants, the Mercury Milan and the Lincoln MKZ – and their hybrid variants) used an acoustic glass for the front windscreen and rear lite. Marketed as Carlite SoundScreen, the glass used a sheet of acoustic vinyl between two layers of glass to reduce noise levels by as much as 6 dB at certain frequencies and 2 to 3 dB overall, enabling more intelligible in-car conversation. The polyvinyl butyral (PVB) layer could save up to seven pounds per vehicle, and helped cut the vibration noise stemming from the vehicle's engine compartment.

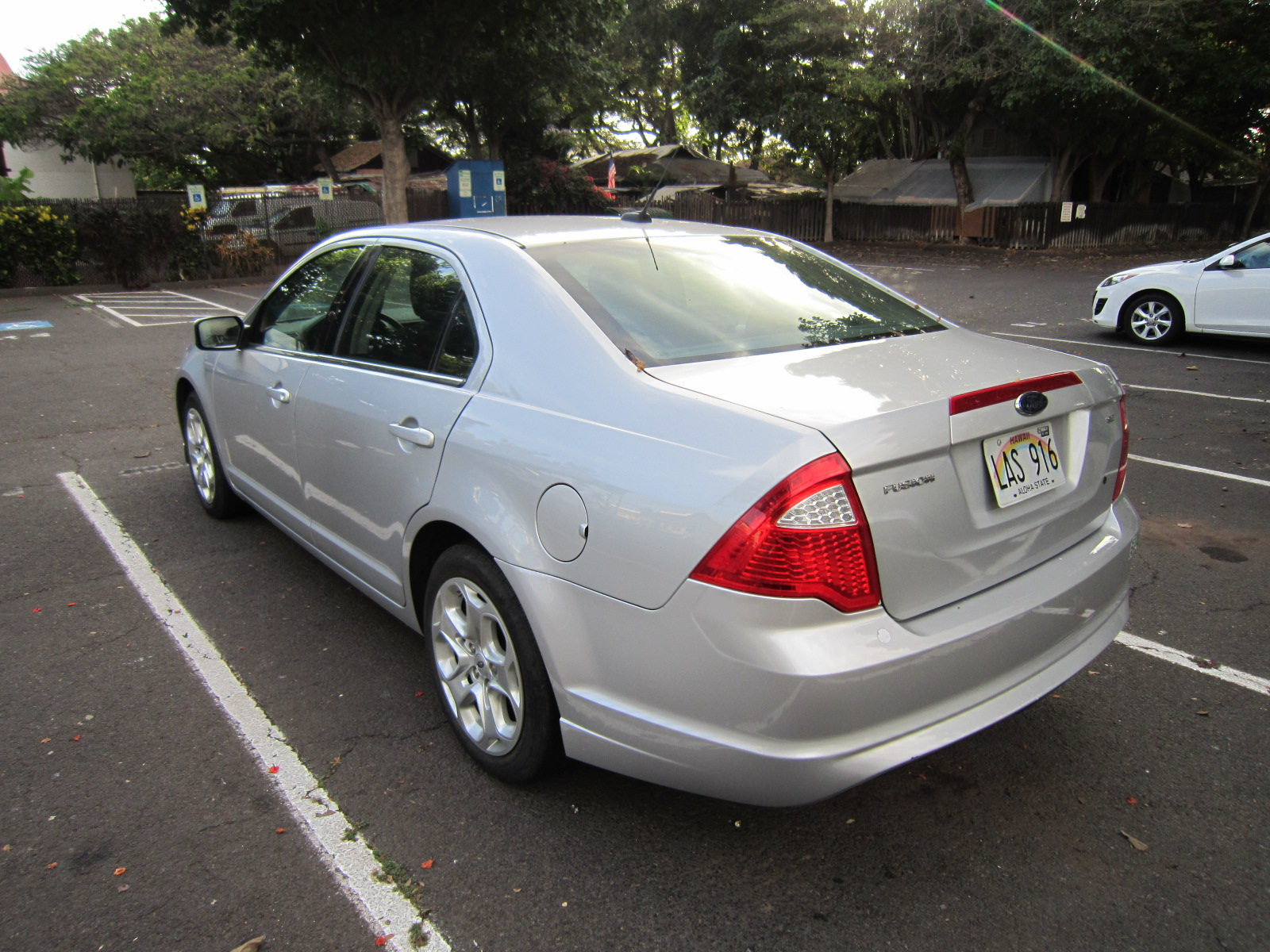
2010 facelift (rear)

==== Trim levels ====
- The S was once again the base model, including the 2.5L Duratec I4 engine (replacing the 2.3 L Duratec), manual transmission, AM/FM stereo with single-disc CD/MP3 player, auxiliary input jack and four speakers, sixteen-inch alloy wheels, cloth seating surfaces, and keyless entry.
- The SE was the mid-range model, adding seventeen-inch steel wheels, six speakers, and power front driver's seat, as well as a security system. SIRIUS Satellite Radio also came standard on this model.
- The SEL was the upper-end model, with seventeen inch aluminum wheels, standard Ford SYNC system and 290 watt Sony 12 speaker surround sound, standard leather seating surfaces (optional cloth for fleet), dual zone automatic temperature control, driver door keypad, and dual power front seats.
- The Sport was a stand-alone model, offering standard eighteen-inch alloy wheels, darkened front grille (2011–2012), rear spoiler, lower body side skirts, leather seating surfaces, a 3.5L Duratec V6 engine, and sport tuned suspension.
- The Hybrid model added onto the SEL model, with a 2.5L Duratec I4 engine assisted by an Atkinson hybrid electric motor, an electroluminescent Optitron-style gauge cluster, dual power front seats, and an Eco Driving mode to tell the driver how economically they are driving.

==== Engines ====
Engine	Power	Torque	EPA Gas Mileage (city/highway/combined) (MPG)	0–60 mph (0–97 km/h) Times
2.5 L (152 cu in) Duratec 25 I4	175 hp (130 kW; 177 PS)	172 lb⋅ft (233 N⋅m)	23/33/26 (automatic); 22/30/25 (selectshift, SE/SEL trims); 22/32/25 (manual, S trim); 22/29/24 (manual, SE trim)	8.0 sec
3.0 L (182 cu in) Duratec 30 V6	240 hp (179 kW; 243 PS)	223 lb⋅ft (302 N⋅m)	20/28/23 FWD; 18/26/20 AWD, gasoline/E85 flex fuel	7.4 sec
3.5 L (213 cu in) Duratec 35 V6	263 hp (196 kW; 267 PS)	249 lb⋅ft (338 N⋅m)	(Fusion Sport); 18/27/21 FWD; 17/24/19 AWD	6.5 sec
2.5 L (152 cu in) Duratec 25 I4	156 hp (116 kW; 158 PS) (engine)	136 lb⋅ft (184 N⋅m) (engine)	(Hybrid) 41/36/39	7.8 sec
2.5 L (152 cu in) Duratec 25 I4	191 hp (142 kW; 194 PS) (combined)	N/A	(Hybrid) 41/36/39	7.8 sec

==== Safety ratings ====
The Ford Fusion line-up was included in the Insurance Institute for Highway Safety 2010 "Top Safety Picks" rating for the mid-size category. Due to the fact that Ford modified and strengthened the roof structure of the Flex, Fusion, and MKT vehicles, these 2010 ratings apply only to Lincoln MKZs, Mercury Milan and Fusions built after April 2010.

==== Safety concerns ====
In June 2010, it was reported that National Highway Traffic Safety Administration was investigating into floormat-related unintended acceleration in 2010 Ford Fusion and Mercury Milan. According to NHTSA's estimate, as many as 249,301 cars could be affected.

On May 28, 2010, the NHTSA issued a statement that the stacking of all-weather floor mats from any manufacturer on top of the factory floor mat could cause accelerator entrapment. In their press release they stated the following: "NHTSA is urging drivers of 2010 Fusions to make sure they do not stack the rubber "All Weather" floor mat on top of the secured carpeted floor mat. Further, drivers are reminded to ensure that any driver-side floor mats (whether they are the carpeted floor mat or all weather floor mat) are properly installed and restrained by the retention hooks on the floorboard. Depending on vehicle and floor mat design, it is possible for unsecured floor mats to interfere with accelerator or brake pedals in a wide range of vehicles. Therefore, NHTSA reminds all drivers of all makes and models to check the driver-side floor mats for secure installation and to follow all manufacturer instructions for installing the mats."

On October 2, 2014, the NHTSA's Office of Defects Investigation opened an investigation into the Electronic Power Assisted Steering (EPAS) subsystem used in Ford Fusions, Lincoln MKZs, and Mercury Milans with model years between 2010 and 2012. The investigation was opened in response to over 500 complaints where motorists reported the sudden loss of power steering while driving. An estimated 938,000 vehicles are included in the investigation. The investigation is ongoing. On May 27, 2015, Ford issued a recall for 2011–2012 Ford Fusions, Mercury Milans, and Lincoln MKZ's made in Mexico, along with 2011–2013 Ford Taurus, Ford Flex, Lincoln MKS and Lincoln MKT's built in Chicago or Oakville. The repair involves a software update and/or steering replacement due to a malfunctioning sensor.

=== Hybrid electric version ===
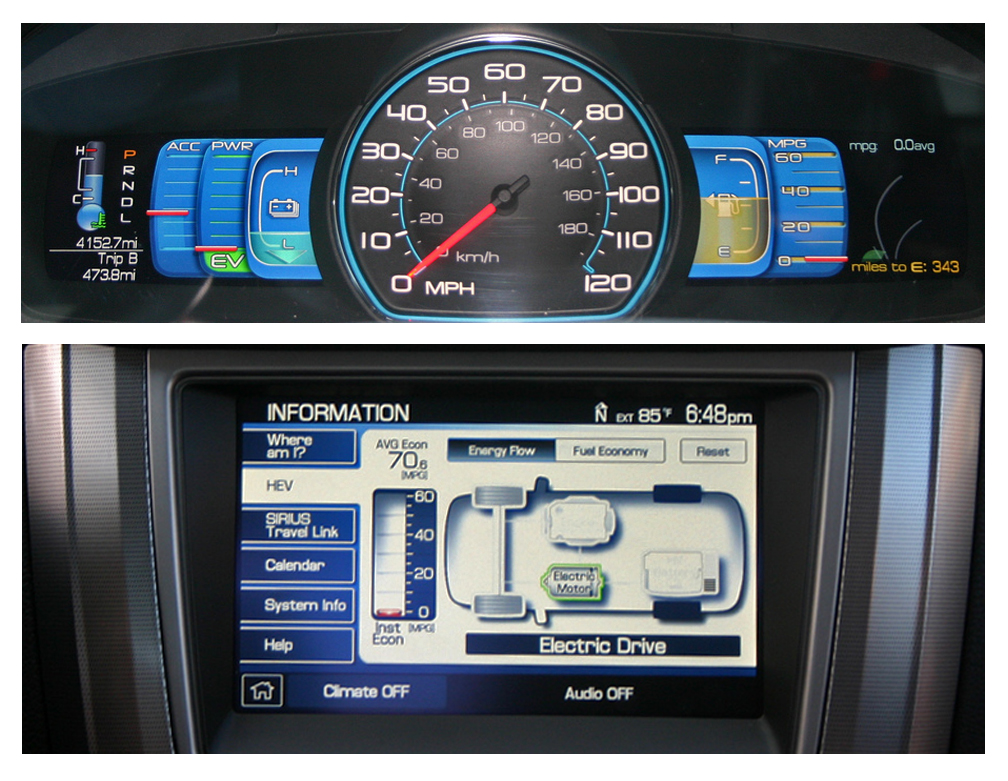
The Fusion Hybrid has digital panels to track eco driving (top), and current hybrid drive propulsion (bottom).

The 2010 Ford Fusion Hybrid is a gasoline-electric hybrid powered version of the mid-size Fusion sedan launched to the U.S. market in March 2009, with an initial sale price of US$27,270. EPA ratings for the Ford Fusion Hybrid are 41 mpg city and 36 mpg highway. In city driving a full tank delivers 700 miles. In April 2009 editors of Kelley Blue Book named the 2010 Ford Fusion Hybrid to its 2009 list of "Top 10 Green Cars".

The Fusion Hybrid qualified for a hybrid tax credit of US$3,400 (~$5,102 in 2025) prior to March 31, 2009. The credit dropped to US$1,700 if purchased by September 30, 2009, and to US$850 if purchased by March 31, 2010. This credit phased out on April 1, 2010.

This model gets better EPA-estimated fuel economy than the Toyota Camry Hybrid, the Nissan Altima Hybrid, and the Chevrolet Malibu Hybrid, viewed as its competitors in the mid-size sedan segment.

Consumer Reports in its December 6, 2012, publication found that the Ford Fusion Hybrid and Ford C-Max Hybrid's tested fuel economy was 20% (8 MPG) short of Ford's EPA mileage claims. After many reports from owners and media of the Ford Fusion Hybrid getting less than the stated 47 MPG city/47 MPG highway/47 MPG combined, a class action lawsuit was brought against Ford on December 26, 2012. Consumer Reports reviewed several other vehicle makes and models and found the Fusion Hybrid from Ford were the worst under-performers compared to EPA fuel efficiency ratings in real world usage compared to 16 others including hybrids.

== Second generation (2013) ==
Second generation
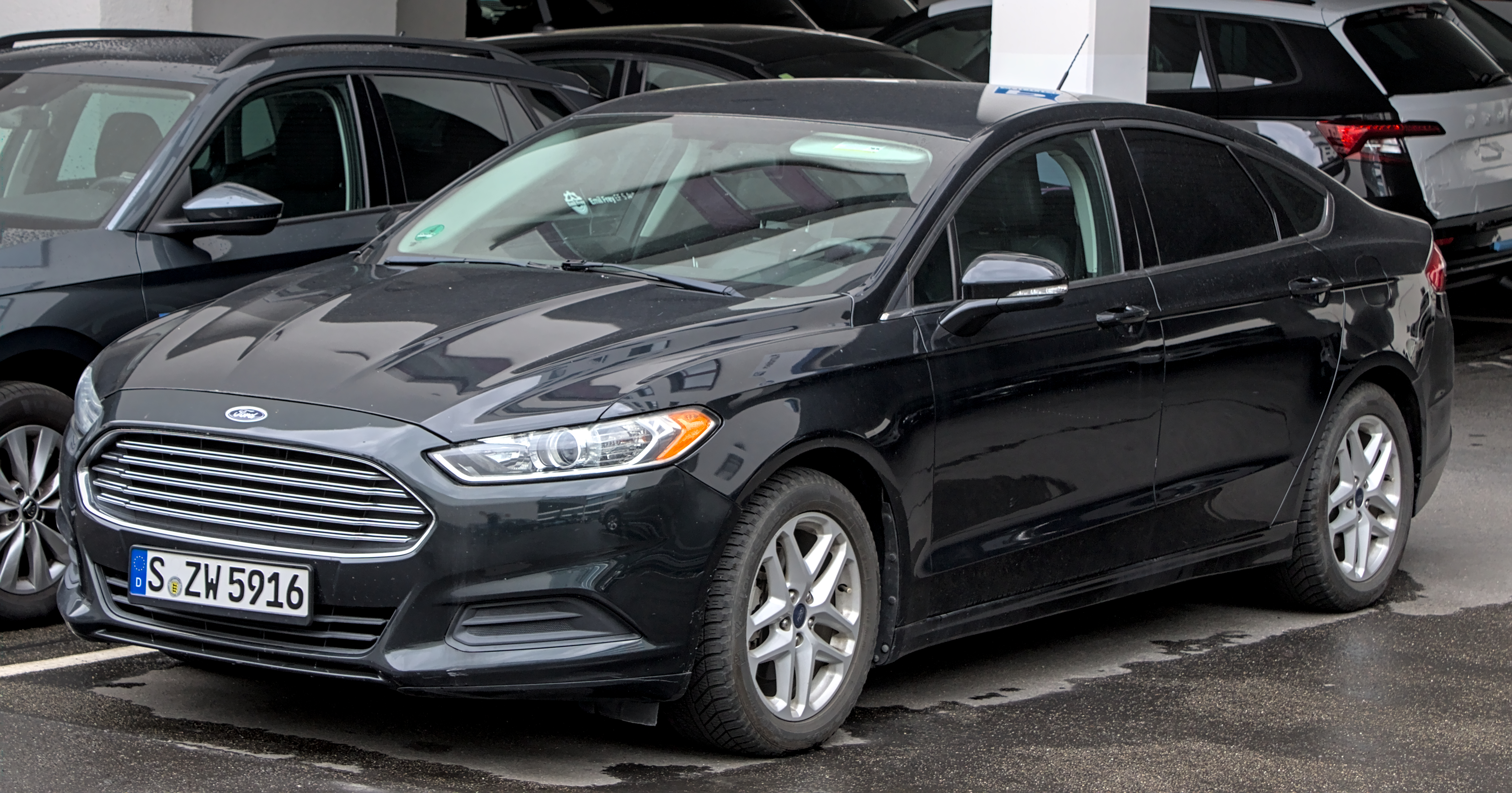

Overview
- Also called: Ford Mondeo; Ford Police Responder Hybrid Sedan; Ford Special Service Plug-In Hybrid Sedan
- Production: 2012–2020
- Model years: 2013–2020
- Assembly: Mexico: Hermosillo, Sonora (Hermosillo Stamping and Assembly); United States: Flat Rock, Michigan (Flat Rock Assembly Plant: 2013–2016)
- Designer: Chris Hamilton, Kemal Curić (2010), Dillon Blanski (2010, 2013)

Body and chassis
- Platform: Ford CD4 platform
- Related: Ford Fusion Energi; Lincoln MKZ; Lincoln Continental; Ford Taurus (seventh generation)

Powertrain
- Engine: Gasoline: 1.5 L EcoBoost turbo I4; 1.6 L EcoBoost turbo I4; 2.0 L EcoBoost turbo I4; 2.5 L Duratec I4; 2.7 L Ecoboost turbo V6 (Sport); Gasoline Hybrid: 2.0 L Duratec I4
- Transmission: 6-speed Ford B6 manual (1.6 EcoBoost only); 6-speed Ford 6F automatic (all engines) eCVT: Ford HF35 (hybrid and PHEV)

Dimensions
- Wheelbase: 112.2 in (2,850 mm)
- Length: 191.7 in (4,869 mm)
- Width: 72.9 in (1,852 mm)
- Height: 58.1 in (1,476 mm)
- Curb weight: 3,323–4,123 lb (1,507–1,870 kg)

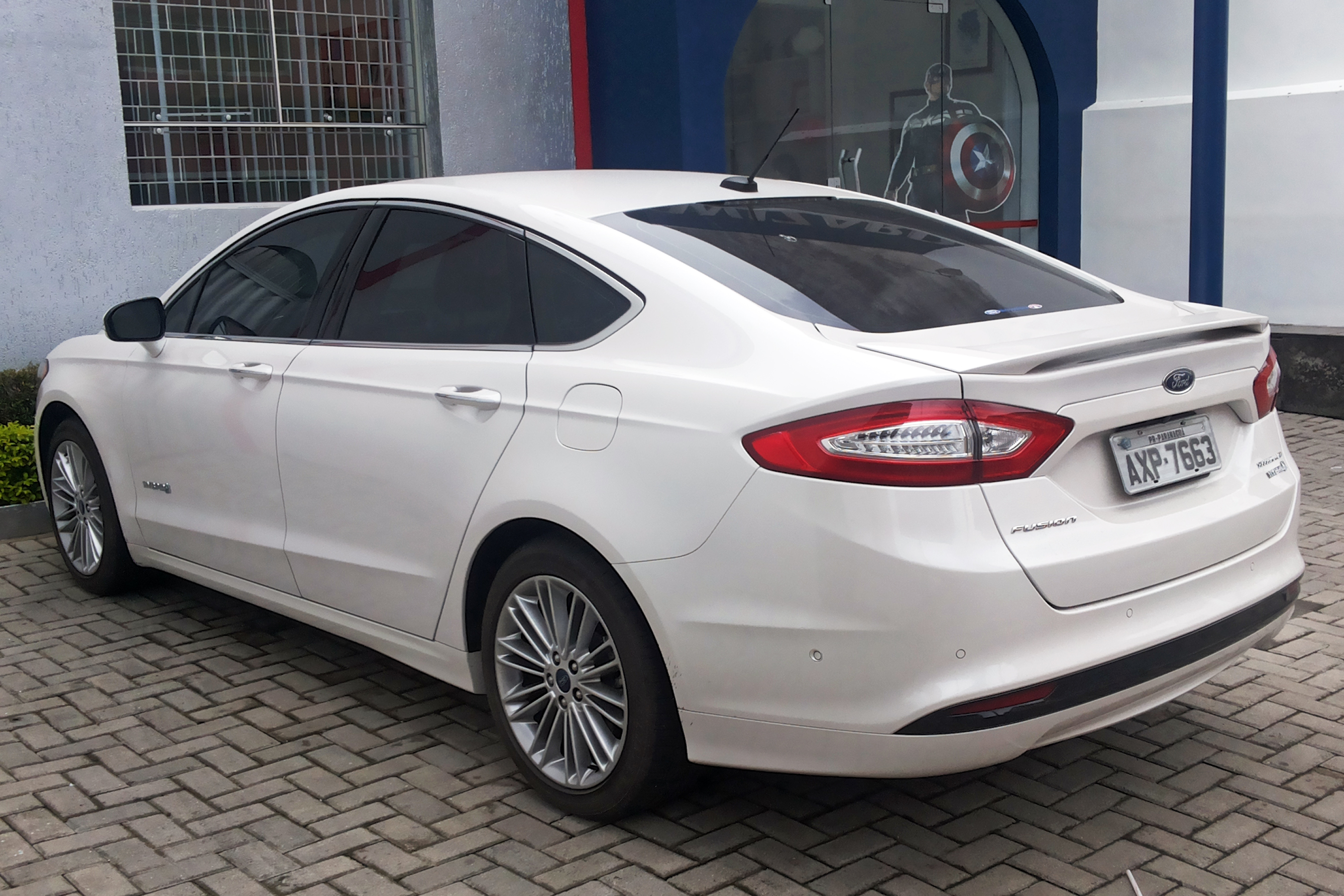
Ford Fusion Hybrid (Brazil)

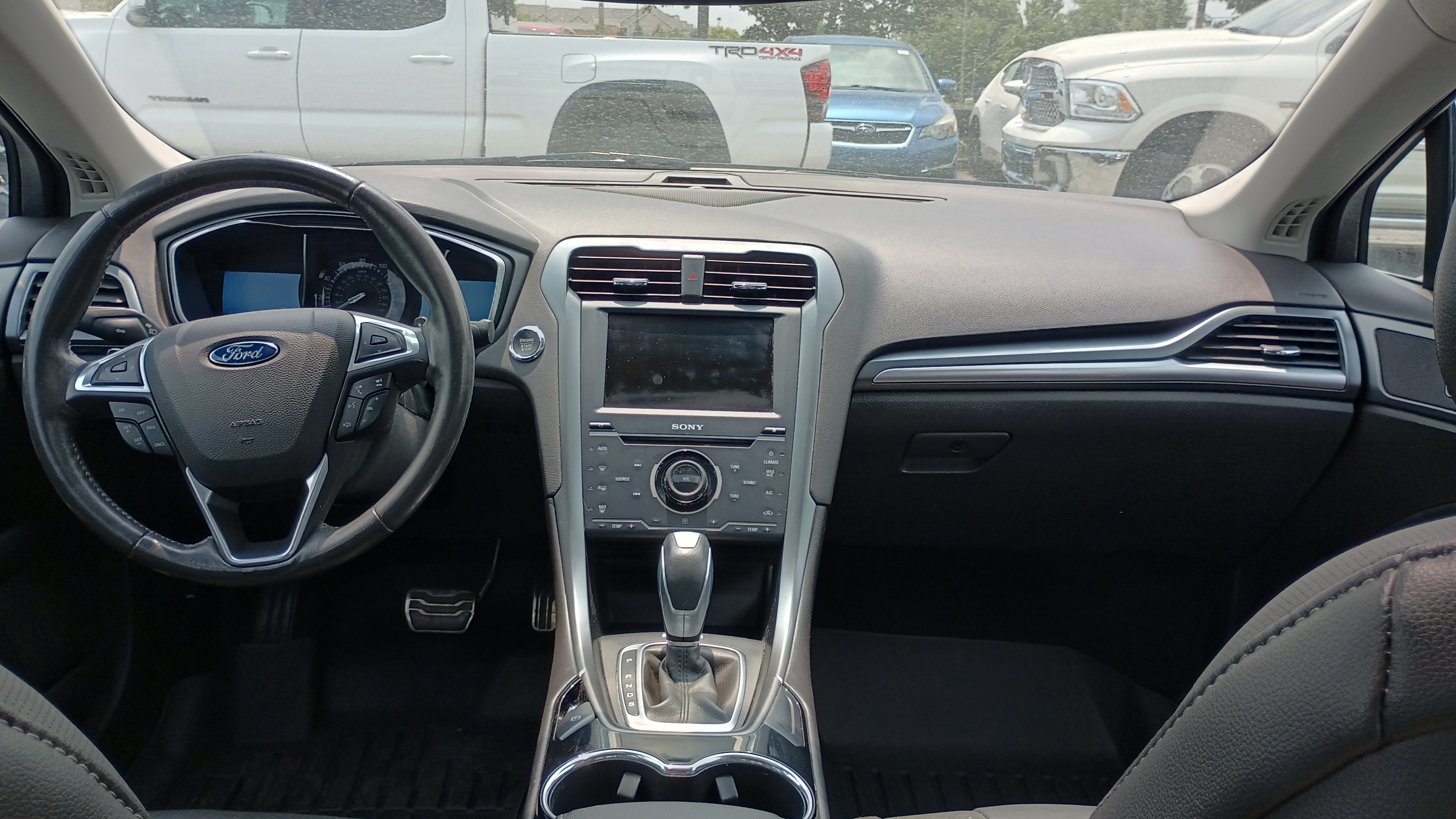
Interior

The second generation Fusion was unveiled at the 2012 North American International Auto Show as a 2013 model. The redesigned Fusion is built on the Ford CD4 platform and is an example of Ford's global car strategy "One-Ford", with design led by Ford of Europe, started with the Focus and then the extension of Fiesta production, which both came into North America in 2012. The new model marks the reconvergence of Ford's mid-size platform for both Europe and the Americas – the CDW27 program which spawned the Ford Contour/Mercury Mystique and the original European Mondeo had been the company's previous attempt at a mid-size car for the world, which was met with mixed success.

As a One-Ford project, Ford of Europe Head of Advanced design team Chris Hamilton was commissioned as lead designer based in Detroit, under the guise Exterior Chief Designer for Ford/Lincoln, with design support led from Ford of Europe studios in Germany and the United Kingdom. Test and development of localized versions was undertaken in both North America and Europe, resulting in different engine choices, automatic gearboxes, suspension settings and tires.

As with the previous generation Fusion, the final assembly took place at Hermosillo Stamping and Assembly, Hermosillo, Sonora, Mexico, with additional capacity added in Flat Rock Assembly Plant, Michigan. The hybrid version and the Fusion Energi plug-in hybrid will continue to be assembled in Mexico. The Mexican assembly plant won the prized MIT, Worlds Best Automobile Plant award. In Europe and other international markets, the engine range is similar, but the 2.5 will only be available in North America. In international markets, a three-cylinder 1.0L 123 bhp EcoBoost, claimed to produce just 125g/km of CO_{2} emissions; and the Ford Fusion Energi plug-in hybrid is expected to be released between 2014 and 2015.

The second generation Fusion was manufactured with a 122 mm (4.8 in) longer wheelbase than the outgoing model's CD3 platform. It was 28 mm (1.1 in) bigger overall, 18 mm (0.7 in) wider, and 31 mm (1.2 in) taller. In contrast to the front double wishbone suspension of the first generation Fusion, at front were MacPherson struts, and at rear was a multi-link rear suspension. Trunk capacity fell from 467 to 453 L (16.5 to 16.0 cu ft).

The 2013 Fusion was available in S, SE, and Titanium trim levels. Ford assembled five different powertrains for the second generation, including two hybrid variants. All available engines were four-cylinder, dropping the previous model's 3.0L V6 as the top tier engine choice, as part of Ford's push to phase out the aging Duratec 30, as well as the Sport package's 3.5L V6 as a performance option. In the 2017 update, the Sport model returned, powered by a 2.7L turbocharged V6.

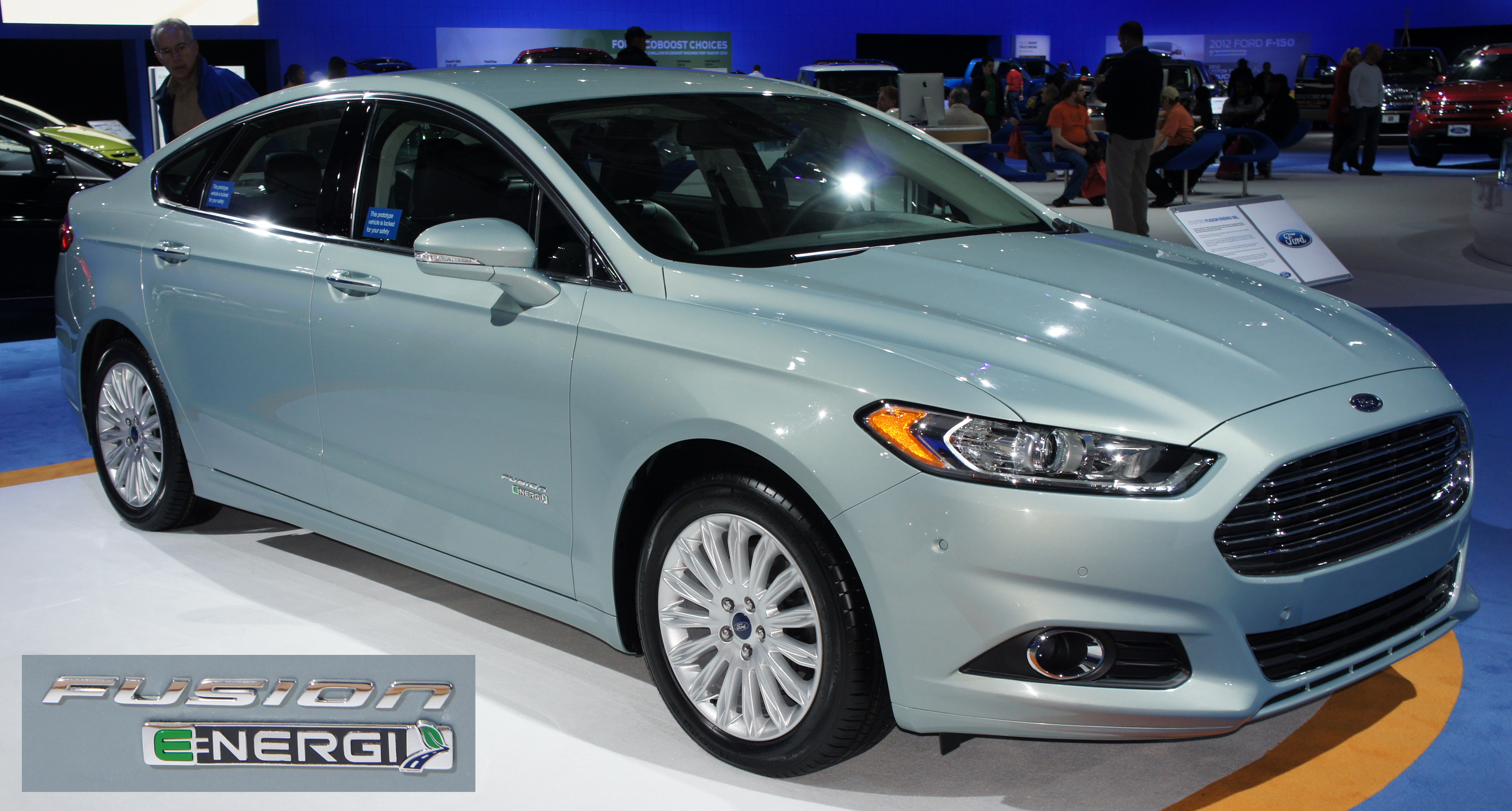
2013 Ford Fusion Energi plug-in hybrid

The second generation Fusion introduced several driver assistance technologies based on sensors, cameras and radar. Safety features include Lane Keeping System; adjust vehicle speed to changing traffic conditions through adaptive cruise control with Forward Collision Warning; active park assist paired with a backup camera; and Blind Spot Information System (BLIS) with cross-traffic alert, which consists of sensors in both rear quarter-panels that are able to detect traffic in a driver's blind spot, providing both audible and visual warnings if traffic unseen by the driver is detected. BLIS technology enables rear cross-traffic alert, aiding drivers backing out of parking space where visibility is obstructed. Other safety features include Ford Sync, second-row Inflatable Safety Belts, Auto Start-Stop, electric power-assisted steering, and Intelligent All-Wheel Drive.

For 2014, a 1.5-liter version replaced the earlier 1.6-liter turbocharged four-cylinder engine option, due to China's much lower tax rate on cars with a displacement below 1500 cc.

=== Models ===
- S The base model, offered a 2.5-litre Duratec I4 engine, automatic transmission, an AM/FM color screen stereo with single-disc CD/MP3 player, and USB, Bluetooth connection, auxiliary input jacks and SIRIUS Satellite Radio, the Ford SYNC System, four speakers, reverse camera with motion activated guidelines, cloth seating surfaces, sixteen-inch steel wheels with plastic wheel covers, chrome door handles, and keyless entry with a switchblade-style key.
- SE Added six speakers, seventeen-inch alloy wheels, and a power front driver's seat. An SE Luxury Package is available that adds features such as dual power front seats, leather seating surfaces, dual heated front seats, a driver's memory system, and a leather-wrapped steering wheel.
- Titanium (replacing the SEL) Added leather seating surfaces, heated front seats, dual power front seats, the MyFord Touch System with an A/M-F/M HD Radio radio (later SYNC 3 with Apple CarPlay and Android Auto smartphone integration), a single-disc CD/MP3 player, SD card slot, USB, A/V, and auxiliary input jacks, push-button start, keyless access, a Sony 390-watt premium surround sound system, and eighteen-inch alloy wheels.
- Hybrid Is offered in the same three trims but for 2017, it is offered in four trims S, SE, Titanium, and Platinum.
- Sport Available starting from the 2017 model year, the inline-4 is replaced by the 2.7 Ecoboost 325-hp V6 engine, adds a black mesh grille, 19-inch wheels, a decklid spoiler, quad exhaust pipes, and standard All Wheel Drive.
- Platinum Added to the Ford Fusion family for the 2017 model year and has many standard features such as Power Moonroof, Universal Garage Opener, Fancy Sport Chrome Mesh Grille, Nappa Leather Seating Surfaces, and Heated and Cooled Front Seats.
- Energi A Plug-in Hybrid Version of the Fusion was offered in two trims SE and Titanium until 2017. The Ford Fusion Platinum Energi was added to the Fusion Energi family for 2017.

=== Engines ===
Year	Engine	Displacement	Power	Torque	Transmission	EPA Fuel Economy (City/Highway/Combined)
2013–2020	Duratec 25 I4	2.5 L (153 cu in)	175 hp (130 kW; 177 PS) @6000rpm	175 lb⋅ft (237 N⋅m) @4500rpm	(6F 6-Speed Automatic)	21 / 31 / 24 mpg_{‑US} (11.2 / 7.6 / 9.8 L/100 km)
2014–2020	1.5 Ecoboost Turbocharged I4	1.5 L (92 cu in)	181 hp (135 kW; 184 PS) @6000rpm	185 lb⋅ft (251 N⋅m) @4320rpm	(6F35 6-Speed Automatic) w/start-stop	23 / 34 / 27 mpg_{‑US} (10.2 / 6.9 / 8.7 L/100 km)
2013–2014	1.6 Ecoboost Turbocharged I4	1.6 L (98 cu in)	179 hp (133 kW; 181 PS) @5700rpm	184 lb⋅ft (249 N⋅m) @2500rpm	(6-speed Ford B6 manual)	25 / 36 / 29 mpg_{‑US} (9.4 / 6.5 / 8.1 L/100 km)
2013	1.6 Ecoboost Turbocharged I4	1.6 L (98 cu in)	179 hp (133 kW; 181 PS) @5700rpm	184 lb⋅ft (249 N⋅m) @2500rpm	(6F35 6-Speed Automatic)	23 / 35 / 27 mpg_{‑US} (10.2 / 6.7 / 8.7 L/100 km)
2013	1.6 Ecoboost Turbocharged I4	1.6 L (98 cu in)	179 hp (133 kW; 181 PS) @5700rpm	184 lb⋅ft (249 N⋅m) @2500rpm	(6F35 6-Speed Automatic) w/start-stop	24 / 35 / 28 mpg_{‑US} (9.8 / 6.7 / 8.4 L/100 km)
2013–2016	2.0 Ecoboost Turbocharged I4	2.0 L (122 cu in)	240 hp (179 kW; 243 PS) @5500rpm	270 lb⋅ft (366 N⋅m) @3000rpm	(FWD) (6F 6-Speed Automatic)	22 / 33 / 26 mpg_{‑US} (10.7 / 7.1 / 9.0 L/100 km)
2013–2016	2.0 Ecoboost Turbocharged I4	2.0 L (122 cu in)	240 hp (179 kW; 243 PS) @5500rpm	270 lb⋅ft (366 N⋅m) @3000rpm	(AWD) (6F 6-Speed Automatic)	22 / 31 / 25 mpg_{‑US} (10.7 / 7.6 / 9.4 L/100 km)
2017-2020	2.0 Ecoboost Turbocharged I4	2.0 L (122 cu in)	245 hp (183 kW; 248 PS) @5500rpm	275 lb⋅ft (373 N⋅m) @3000rpm	(FWD) (6F 6-Speed Automatic)	21 / 31 / 25 mpg_{‑US} (11.2 / 7.6 / 9.4 L/100 km)
2017-2020	2.0 Ecoboost Turbocharged I4	2.0 L (122 cu in)	245 hp (183 kW; 248 PS) @5500rpm	275 lb⋅ft (373 N⋅m) @3000rpm	(AWD) (6F 6-Speed Automatic)	20 / 29 / 23 mpg_{‑US} (11.8 / 8.1 / 10.2 L/100 km)
2013–2020	Duratec 20 I4	2.0 L (122 cu in)	141 hp (105 kW; 143 PS) @6000rpm (engine)	129 lb⋅ft (175 N⋅m) @4000rpm (engine)	Ford HF35 Hybrid eCVT	43 / 41 / 42 mpg_{‑US} (5.5 / 5.7 / 5.6 L/100 km)
2013–2020	Duratec 20 I4	2.0 L (122 cu in)	188 hp (140 kW; 191 PS) (total system)	177 lb⋅ft (240 N⋅m) (total system)	Ford HF35 Hybrid eCVT	43 / 41 / 42 mpg_{‑US} (5.5 / 5.7 / 5.6 L/100 km)
2017–2019	2.7 Ecoboost Turbocharged V6	2.7 L (165 cu in)	325 hp (242 kW; 330 PS) @5500rpm	380 lb⋅ft (515 N⋅m) @3000rpm	(6F55 6-Speed Automatic)	17 / 26 / 20 mpg_{‑US} (13.8 / 9.0 / 11.8 L/100 km)

The 2017–2020 Fusion introduced a revised 2.0 engine with a twin scroll turbocharger producing 245 hp and 275 lb-ft with a 1 mpg overall increase in fuel economy.

=== Hybrid ===
The new 2013 line-up also includes a next-generation hybrid version, and a plug-in hybrid version, the Ford Fusion Energi. The Ford Fusion became the first production sedan to offer these three options. Sales of the gasoline-powered and hybrid version began in the US in October 2012. Sales in Europe and Asia, as Ford Mondeo, are expected to begin in 2013. Deliveries of the Fusion Energi began the U.S. in February 2013. Sales of the Mondeo line-up, including the hybrid model, began in Germany in August 2014.

For the second generation Fusion Hybrid, lithium-ion batteries superseded the nickel-metal hydride batteries of the hybrid first generation. The 2013 model year is more fuel efficient than its predecessor, with a US Environmental Protection Agency (EPA) rating of 47 mpg_{‑US} (5.0 L/100 km; 56 mpg_{‑imp}) with the same rating for combined/city/highway cycles. This rating is also the same Ford achieved for the 2013 Ford C-Max Hybrid, as both hybrids share the same engine and drivetrain. These ratings allowed the 2013 Fusion Hybrid to outperform the 2012 Toyota Camry Hybrid LE by 4 mpg‑US (0,5 L/100 km; 4.8 mpg‑imp) city and 8 mpg‑US (1 L/100 km; 9.6 mpg‑imp) highway, and to become the most efficient midsize hybrid sedan in the U.S. as of September 2012. The Duratec 2.5, and EcoBoost 1.5, 1.6 and 2.0 are sourced from Chihuahua, Mexico; Craiova, Romania; Bridgend, Wales; and Valencia, Spain respectively. The 6F and HF35 automatic transmissions are sourced from Ford's Van Dyke Transmission Plant in Sterling Heights, Michigan, while the B6 manual is produced at the GETRAG FORD Transmissions GmbH facility in Halewood, United Kingdom.

=== 2017 facelift ===
Ford updated the Fusion for the 2017 model year. The facelifted version was first unveiled at the 2016 North American International Auto Show on January 11, 2016.

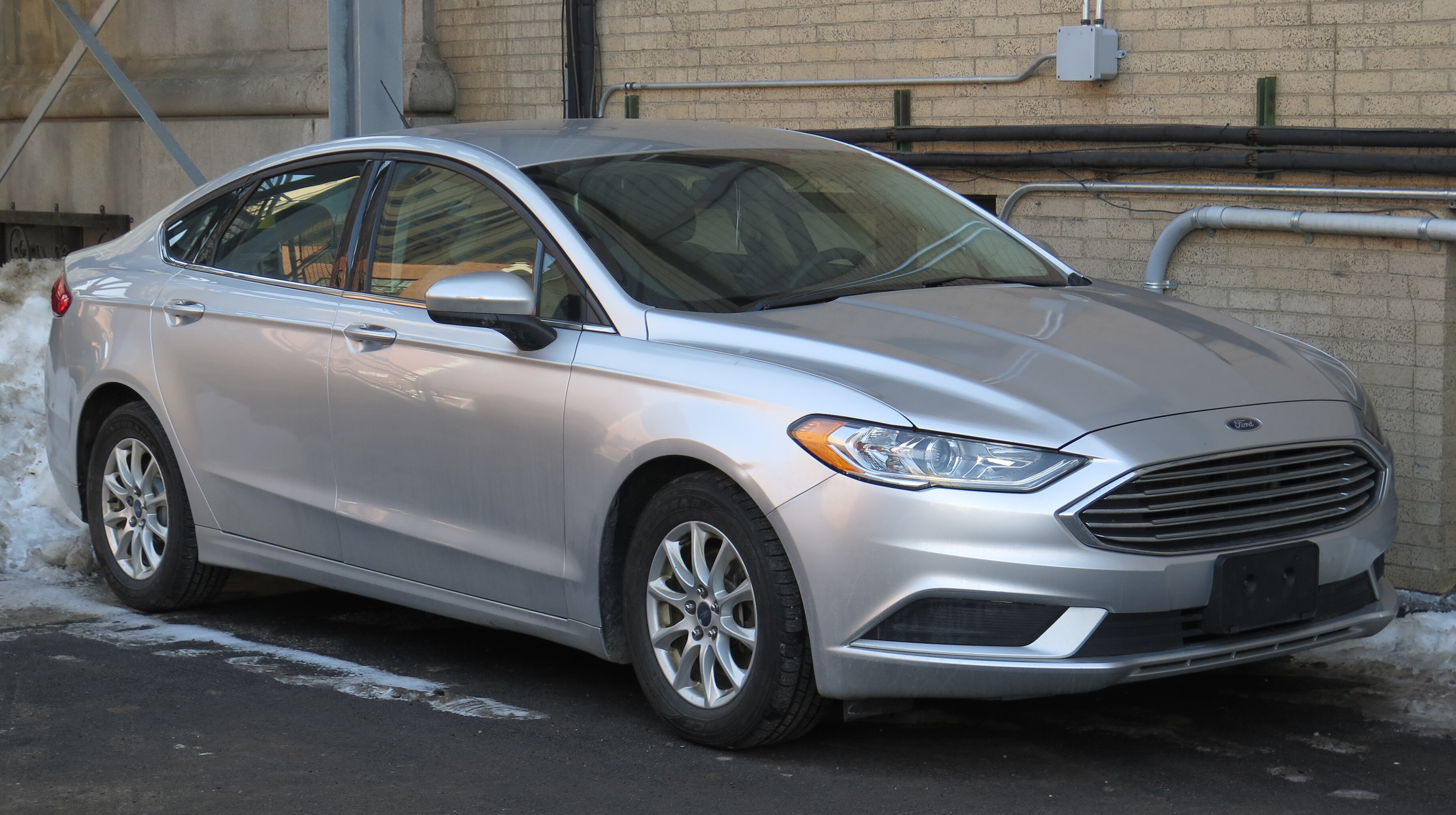
2017 facelift

All Fusions received new packages, new front and rear end styling, a new rotary-controlled automatic transmission, and two new trim levels of the gasoline-powered Fusion: the high-performance Sport, which marks the first time that a V6 engine has been installed into a second-generation Fusion, and the Platinum, which adds more luxury features onto the previously top-of-the-line Titanium trim level (the Platinum is also available for both the Fusion Hybrid and Fusion Energi models). Also new for 2017 on most Fusion models is Ford's new SYNC 3 infotainment system with Android Auto and Apple CarPlay compatibility, which replaces the MyFord Touch infotainment system that was offered on the 2016 Fusion.

Pricing starts at $22,120 for a base gas-powered Fusion S model with the 2.5 L Duratec I4 engine, and tops out at $39,120 for a top-of-the-line Fusion Energi Platinum model with an Atkinson Cycle 2.0 L I4 engine and an electric motor with EV Mode.

=== 2019 facelift ===
Ford again updated the Fusion for the 2019 model year. This version debuted at the 2018 New York International Auto Show, and went on sale in late summer 2018.

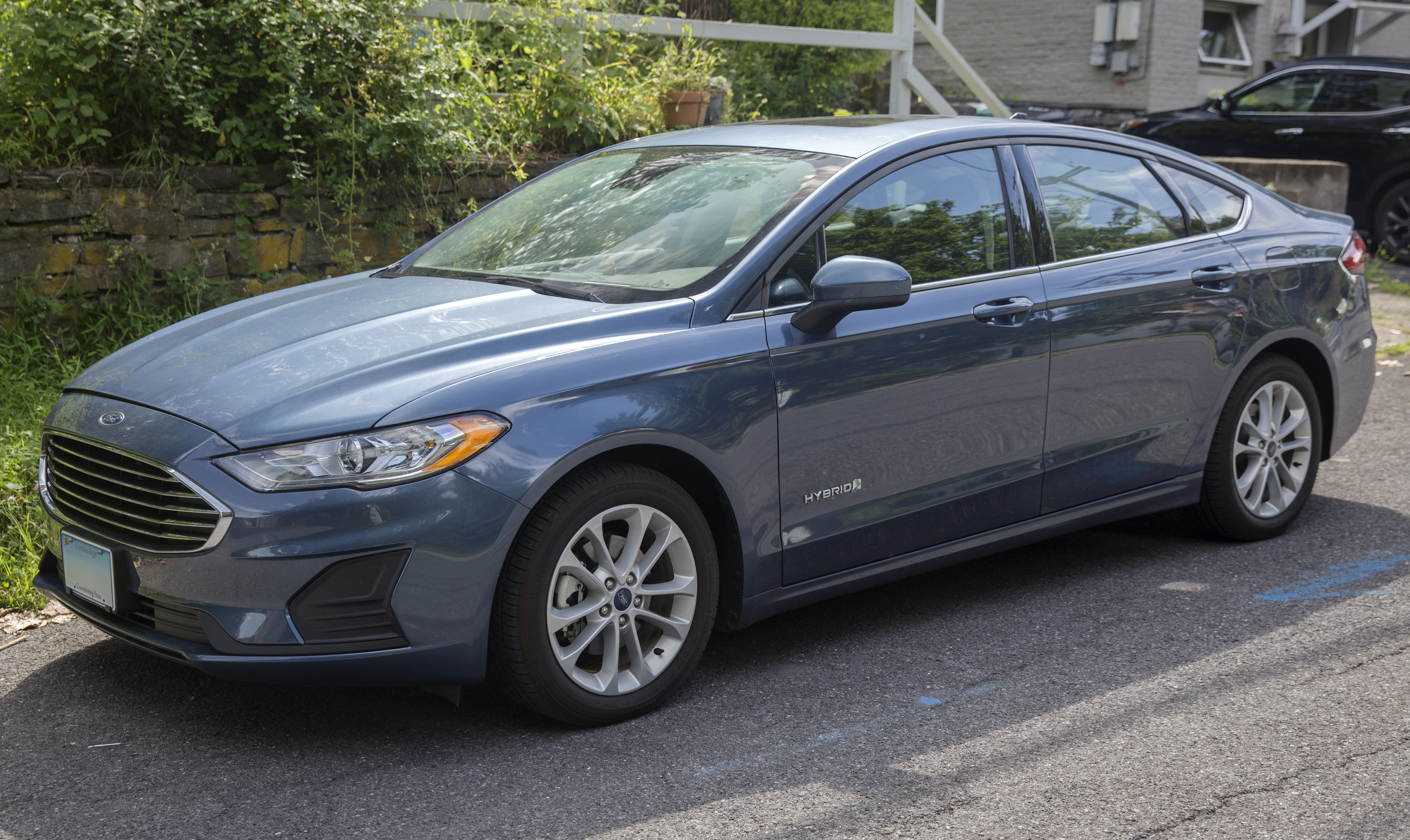
2019 facelift

The 2019 Fusion adds Ford's "Co-Pilot 360" safety suite as standard on all models. It includes automatic emergency braking, lane-keeping assist, blind-spot and rear-cross-traffic warning systems, automatic highbeams, and automatic wipers.

The new models have updated front and rear styling. The 1.5 L EcoBoost engine is now standard on SE and higher models, except for the V6 Sport, formerly known as Sport. The SEL replaces the SE Luxury Package, and the Platinum is dropped, moving the Titanium up-level. The Hybrid is no longer available in base S trim, and the Energi is available only in Titanium trim. The Energi model's battery range will increase from 22 miles to 25 miles, and the battery may take less space in the trunk.

=== 2020 changes ===
For the 2020 model year, the Fusion lineup has been condensed. There are now four gasoline-only Fusion models: S, SE, SEL, and Titanium, two Fusion Hybrid models (SE and Titanium), and only one Fusion Energi Plug-In Hybrid (PHEV) model: the Titanium. The Sport, Hybrid S, and Energi SE trims have all been discontinued for 2020. All trim levels offer a higher level of standard equipment, as well as fewer options. The S trim level is powered by a 2.5L DuraTec inline four-cylinder (I4) naturally-aspirated gasoline engine. SE and SEL trims are powered by the 1.5L EcoBoost turbocharged I4 gasoline engine, and the Titanium trim level is powered by the 2.0L EcoBoost turbocharged I4 gasoline engine. All Fusion Hybrid and Fusion Energi models are powered by an Atkinson cycle naturally-aspirated 2.0L I4 gasoline engine with an electric motor, as well as a Continuously Variable Transmission (CVT). Gasoline-only Fusion models use a six-speed automatic transmission. All Fusion Hybrid and Fusion Energi models are exclusively offered with front wheel drive (FWD), while select gasoline-only Fusion models are offered with all wheel drive.

All trim levels offer Ford's SYNC 3 touchscreen infotainment system with Apple CarPlay and Android Auto smartphone integration and SiriusXM Satellite Radio and Travel Link service, GPS navigation, and the FordPass Connect 4G LTE mobile Wi-Fi hotspot as standard equipment, except for the base S, where it is available as part of the Ford CoPilot360+ Package. All models feature Ford's CoPilot360 driver assistance system, with most models also offering the Ford CoPilot360+ system. S and SE trims receive cloth seating surfaces, while SEL and Hybrid SE models receive "Active-X" leatherette-trimmed seating surfaces, and Titanium, Hybrid Titanium, and Energi Titanium receive leather-trimmed seating surfaces.

The Sport and its 2.7L twin-turbocharged EcoBoost V6 gasoline engine have been discontinued for the 2020 model year.

=== Safety and recall ===
In 2012, Ford recalled about 90,000 2013 Ford Escape and Fusion in the U.S. and Canada with 1.6-liter engines that may overheat and cause fires after 13 reports of fire were reported to Ford.

In 2017, Ford recalled 2013–2014 Ford Fusion with 1.6 ecoboost engines because of a risk of engine fires caused by a "lack of coolant circulation". The recall partly contributed to a charge of US$300 million by Ford.

In 2018, Ford recalled 2013–15 Ford Fusion with 1.6-liter Sigma GTDI engines and B6 manual transmissions, due to potential risk of the steering wheel becoming loose.

On May 15, 2019, Ford recalled about 270,000 2013–16 Ford Fusion with the 2.5L engine and automatic transmission due to the possibility that a bushing that holds the transmission lever safety cable in place could detach from the cable, which could potentially lead to the transmission lever safety cable becoming detached from the bushing, and allowing the transmission to not remain in 'Park', even if 'Park' is selected. If the transmission shift lever safety cable becomes loose, the vehicle will falsely register that the transmission is in 'Park', and will not show a warning message or sound a warning chime upon removal of the ignition key, and could also pose a rollaway risk.

On June 9, 2022, a Customer Satisfaction Program 19B37 & 21N12 were initiated for "Certain 2017-2019 Model Year Fusion Vehicles Equipped with a 1.5L GTDI Engine--Short Block Replacement After Coolant Intrusion."

A Technical Service Bulletin (TSB) 22-2134 was dated on December 19, 2022, and released by Ford Motor Company. In the TSB, the program terms indicate " a no-cost, one-time repair (if needed) to the 1.5L short block, due to coolant intrusion to the cylinder bores, for 7 years of service or 84,000 miles from the warranty start date of the vehicle, whichever occurs first."

== Discontinuation ==
In 2018, Ford began plans to discontinue the Fusion along with its other sedans in North America over the following years, as the marque shifts towards pickups, CUVs, SUVs and the Mustang muscle car. In September of that year, Ford ended all national and promotional advertising (including sales and special offers) for its entire sedan lineup, including the Fusion, whose production continued.

The performance-oriented Fusion Sport was discontinued after the 2019 model year, with Ford focusing "on more popular styles" of the Fusion. 2020 was the final model year for the Fusion in North America, effectively ending what was left of Ford's 4-door car lineup in North America.

== Auto racing ==
=== NASCAR ===
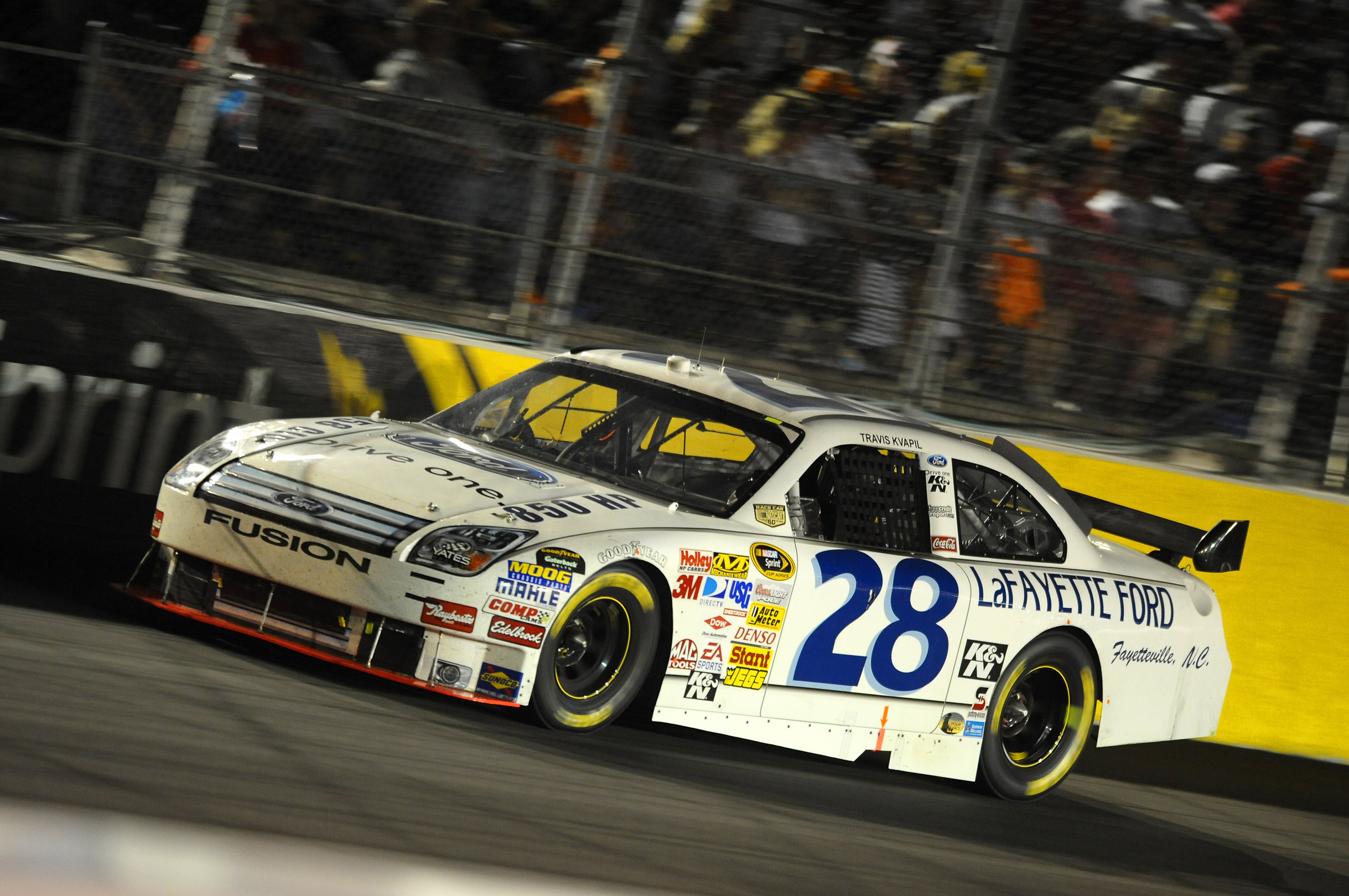
Travis Kvapil's Ford Fusion stock car at Darlington in 2008

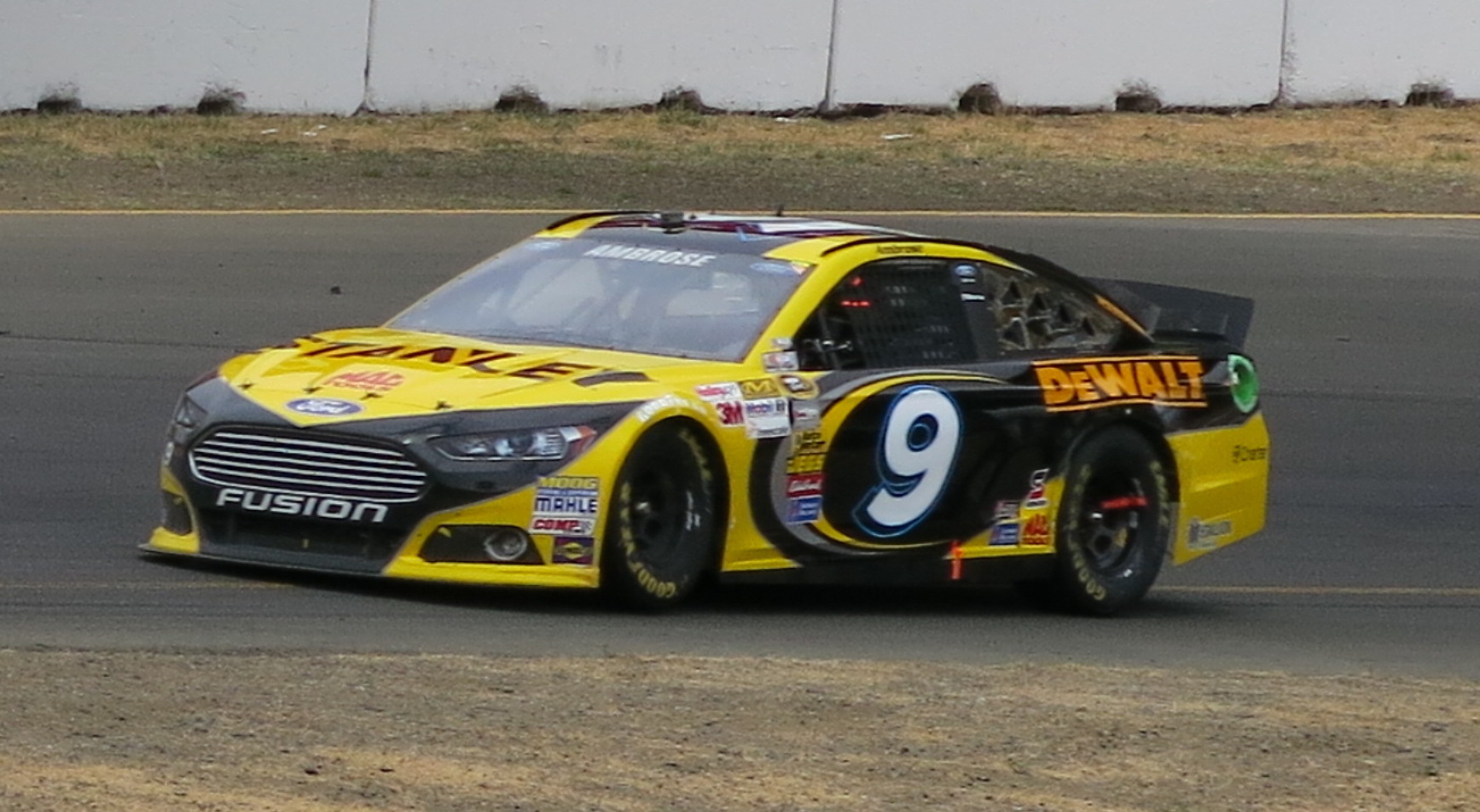
Marcos Ambrose's 2013 Ford Fusion stock car at Sonoma Raceway

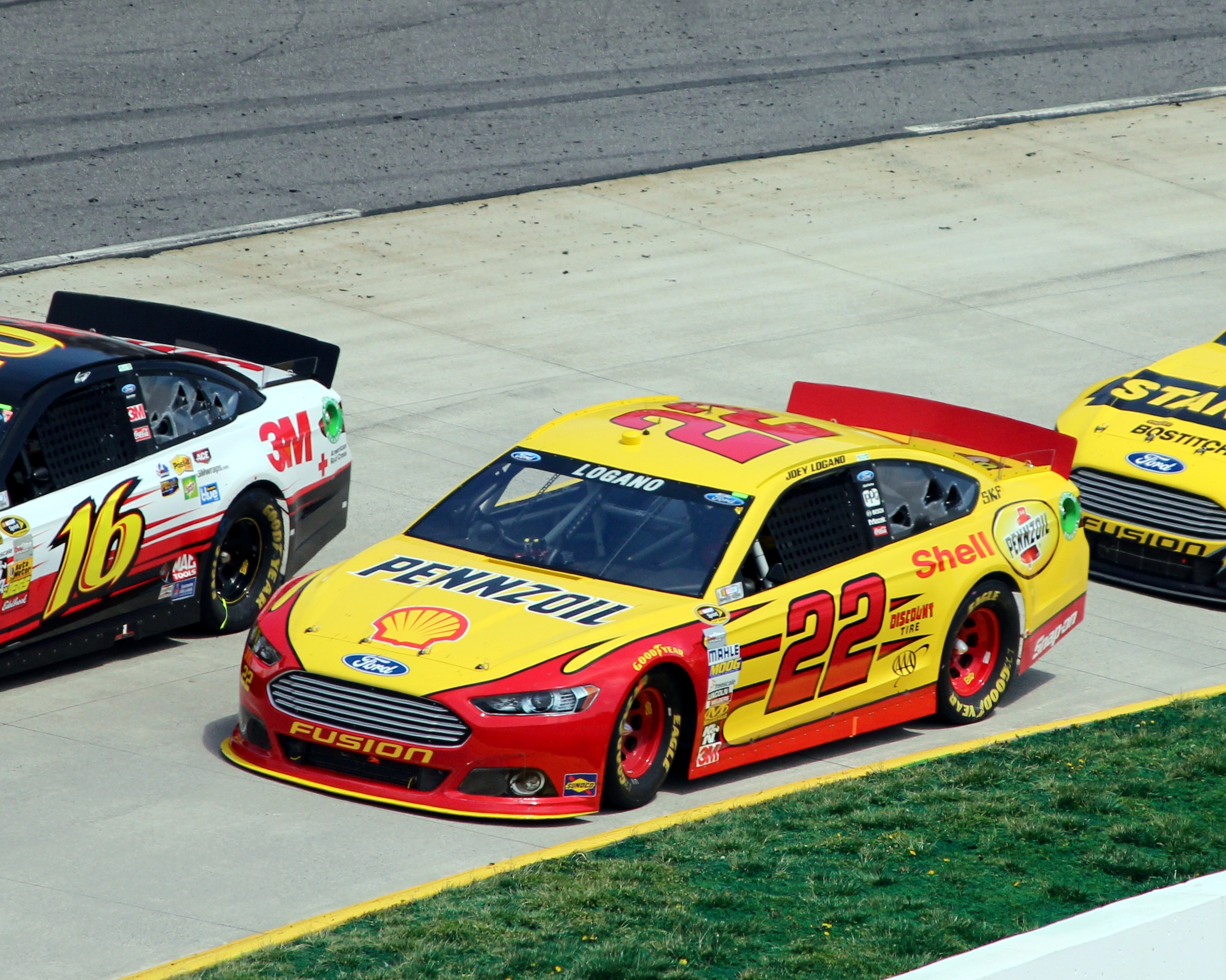
The 2013 NASCAR Sprint Cup Series Generation 6 version of the Ford Fusion as driven by Joey Logano at Martinsville Speedway.

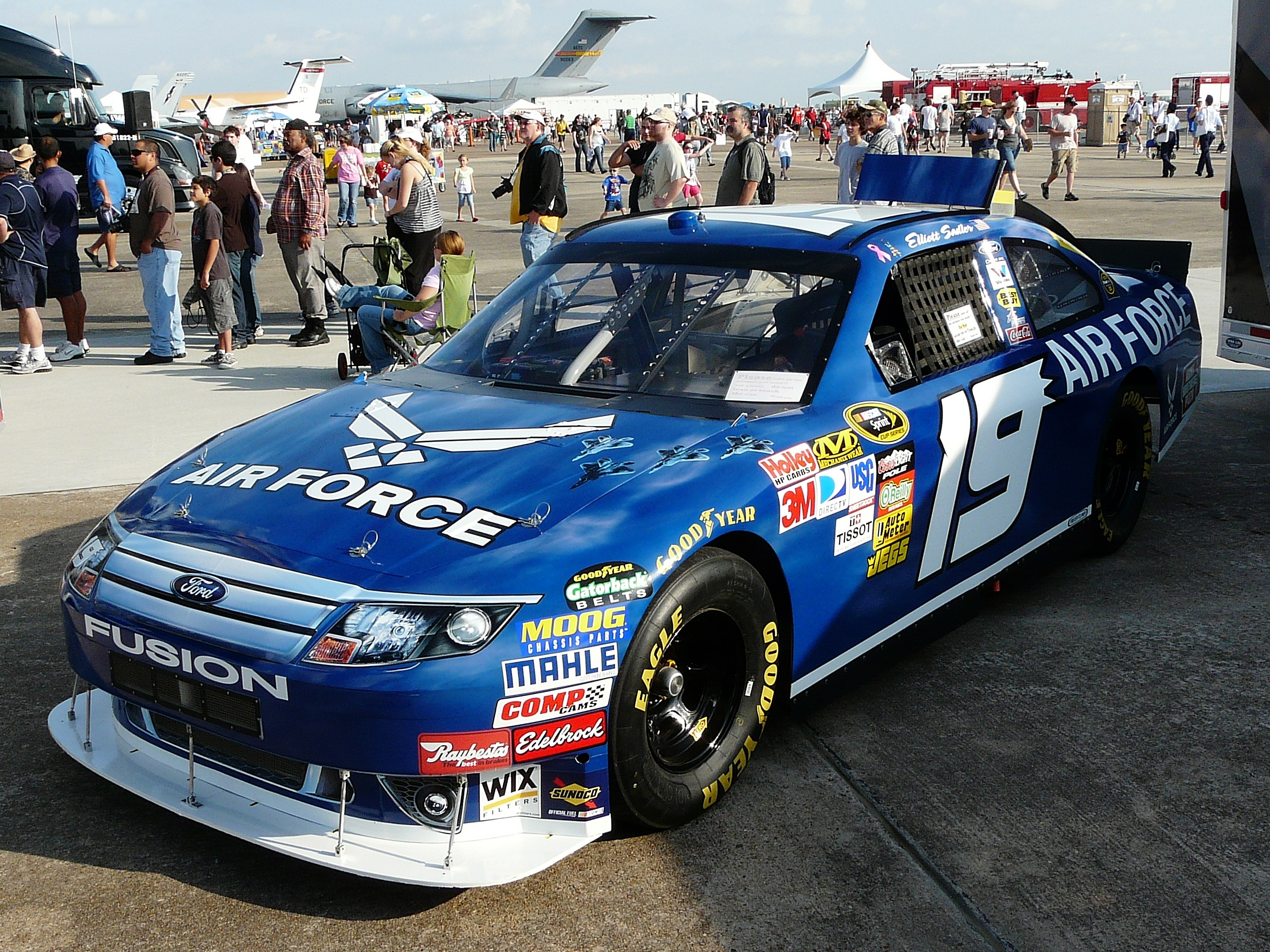
2010 Ford Fusion stock car

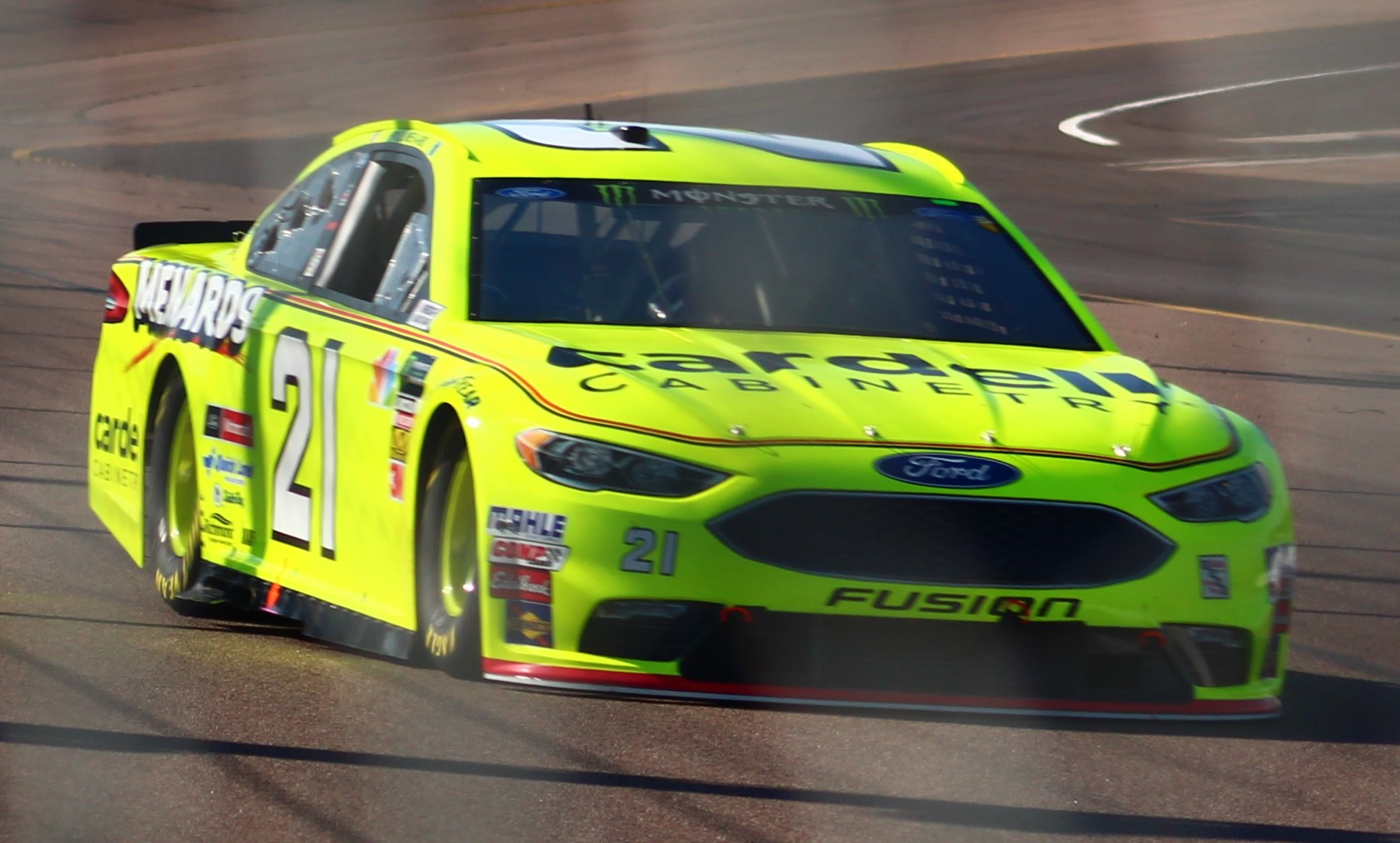
Paul Menard's 2018 Ford Fusion at Phoenix Raceway

The Fusion also became the new body style for Ford automobiles in NASCAR beginning in 2006, replacing the Taurus. This marked the first time since the Torino in 1968 that Ford introduced a new model that went racing in NASCAR at the same time as its launch.

For the introduction of the Generation 6 body design in 2013, the vehicles were updated to match the second generation Fusion. The Generation 6 body styles were also meant to closer resemble the production versions of their respective vehicles.

The Mustang replaced the Fusion in the 2019 Monster Energy NASCAR Cup Series season.

=== Land speed record success ===
Ford attempted to use a fuel cell version of the Fusion, Ford Fusion Hydrogen 999, to set a land speed record on August 10–17 during Bonneville Speed Week in 2007. The Fusion 999 project was born in early 2006 when Ford fuel cell engineering manager Mujeeb Ijaz approached Roush Racing about a project to demonstrate the performance potential of a fuel cell-powered vehicle.

Roush's team, led by Rick Darling, worked with a team of Ford engineers and technicians led by Matt Zuehlk to come up with a vehicle design that could meet the goal of exceeding 200 mph (320 km/h) on the Bonneville Salt Flats, fueled only by hydrogen. On August 15, 2007, the vehicle set the fastest fuel cell ground vehicle speed record of 207.297 mph (333.612 km/h).

The car was driven by retired Ford engineer Rick Byrnes, a long time Bonneville racer.

== Awards ==
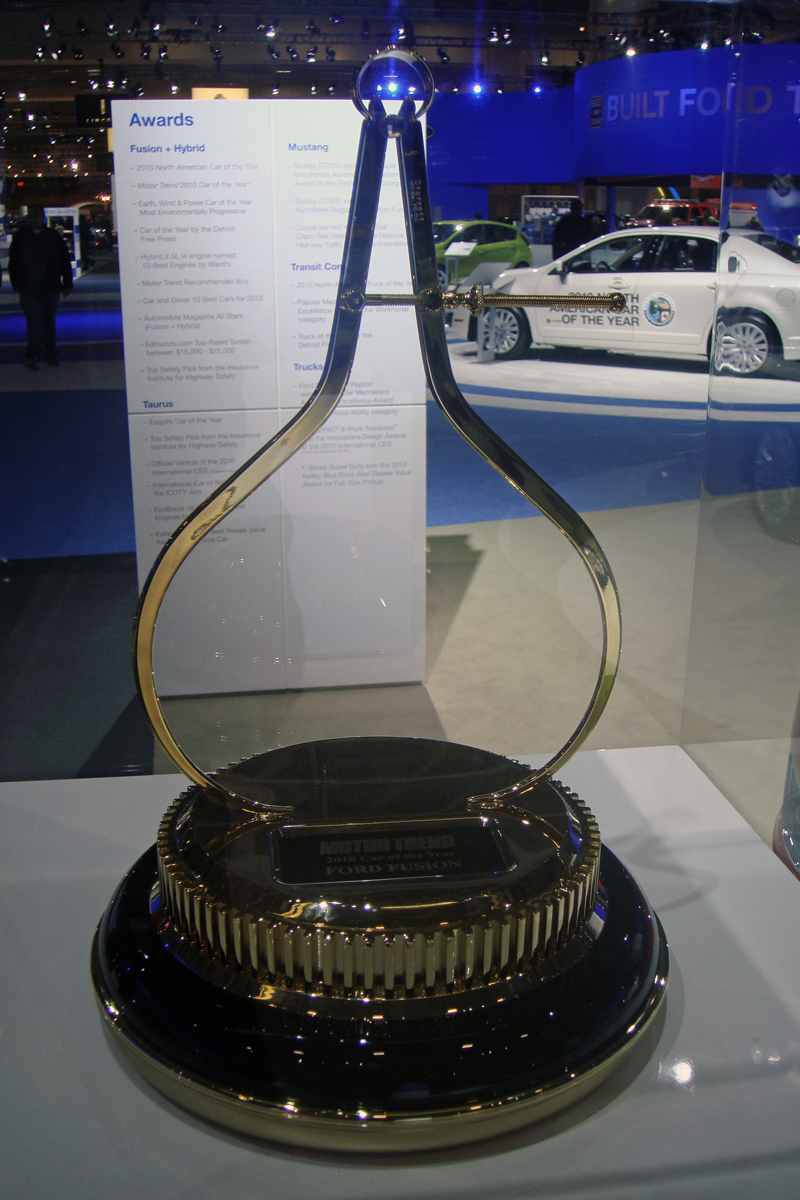
2010 Motor Trend Car of the Year trophy won by the Ford Fusion line-up exhibited at the 2010 Washington Auto Show.

- In July 2006, Strategic Vision gave the Fusion its Total Quality Award as the best-quality midsize sedan on the American market.
- In March 2006, the International Carwash Association named the Fusion America's "Most Washable Car."
- In November 2009, the 2010 Ford Fusion line-up was selected as the 2010 Motor Trend Car of the Year, beating a field of nearly two dozen contenders.
- In December 2009, Car and Driver magazine listed the 2010 Fusion Hybrid as one of the "10 Best Cars". The piece stated that the Fusion Hybrid was the most advanced of all the cars they tested.
- In January 2010, the Fusion Hybrid won the 2010 North American Car of the Year Award at the Detroit Auto Show, and was named "Best of 2010" by Cars.com.
- In November 2012, the 2013 Ford Fusion (second generation) line-up, including the gasoline and EcoBoost engine options, and the Fusion hybrid and plug-in variants, won the 2013 Green Car of the Year awarded by the Green Car Journal at the Los Angeles Auto Show.
- In 2017, the Ford Fusion was awarded the MotorWeek Drivers' Choice Award for Best Family Sedan.

== Reviews ==
- In a December 2005 test, Car and Driver ranked the Fusion just below the first-place Honda Accord, edging out the Toyota Camry and Hyundai Sonata by only a few points. "The Verdict: Not your father's Taurus".
- Consumer Reports has also given positive reviews to the Fusion, as it had to the previous Taurus. It rated the Fusion Hybrid the top domestic sedan for 2010. In 2009, the magazine's automotive editor, Rik Paul, said, "The Ford cars outscored Honda's Accord and Toyota's Camry, the two top-selling cars in America, 'which many people view as the paradigms of reliability'," referring to the Fusion and Mercury Milan.
- Ford Fusion ranked highest among midsize cars in the JD Power APEAL study for 2006.
- In the January 2009 issue, Motor Trend rated the Fusion Hybrid ahead of the Toyota Camry Hybrid. and in the February 2009 issue rated the Fusion Hybrid ahead of the Toyota Camry Hybrid, the Nissan Altima Hybrid, and the Chevrolet Malibu Hybrid.
- In a 2012 comparison test by Motor Trend, the Ford Fusion came in third place out of six cars behind the first place Volkswagen Passat and second place Honda Accord.

== Consumer response ==
According to Ford, consumer response to the 2006 Fusion had exceeded their expectations, with 30,000 sold during the first quarter of 2006. By October 2009, the Fusion became one of the top ten best-selling cars in the U.S. for the first time, as well as the best-selling car by a domestic automaker.

For the 2007 model year, approximately 77% of Fusion sales were for the retail market, with 23% for the fleet market. This sales mix has contributed, in part, to the Fusion's relatively high residual value compared to the Taurus.

Ford also sold the Fusion in Mexico and Brazil. In Brazil, it became the highest-selling car in its class in 2008.

== Yearly U.S. sales ==
Calendar Year	Total Sales	YOY change	Hybrid Sales	Hybrid Share	Energi Sales	Energi Share
2005	16,983	n/a				
2006	142,502	+739%				
2007	149,552	+5.0%				
2008	147,569	−1.3%				
2009	180,671	+22.4%	15,554	8.6%		
2010	219,219	+21.3%	20,816	9.5%		
2011	248,067	+13.2%	11,286	4.5%		
2012	241,263	−2.7%	14,100	5.8%		
2013	295,280	+22.4%	37,270	12.6%	6,089	2.1%
2014	306,860	+3.9%	35,405	11.5%	11,550	3.8%
2015	300,170	−2.2%	24,681	8.2%	9,750	3.2%
2016	265,840	−11.4%	33,648	12.7%	15,938	6.0%
2017	209,623	−21.1%	57,474	27.4%	9,632	4.6%
2018	173,600	−17.2%				
2019	166,045	−4.4%				
2020	110,665	−33.4%				
2021	11,781	−89.4%				
Cumulative sales 2005–2017	2,723,599	n/a	250,234	9.2%	52,959	1.9%
Notes: YOY: year-over-year, n/a: not applicable
