= Ultima Sport =

Sports Kit Car

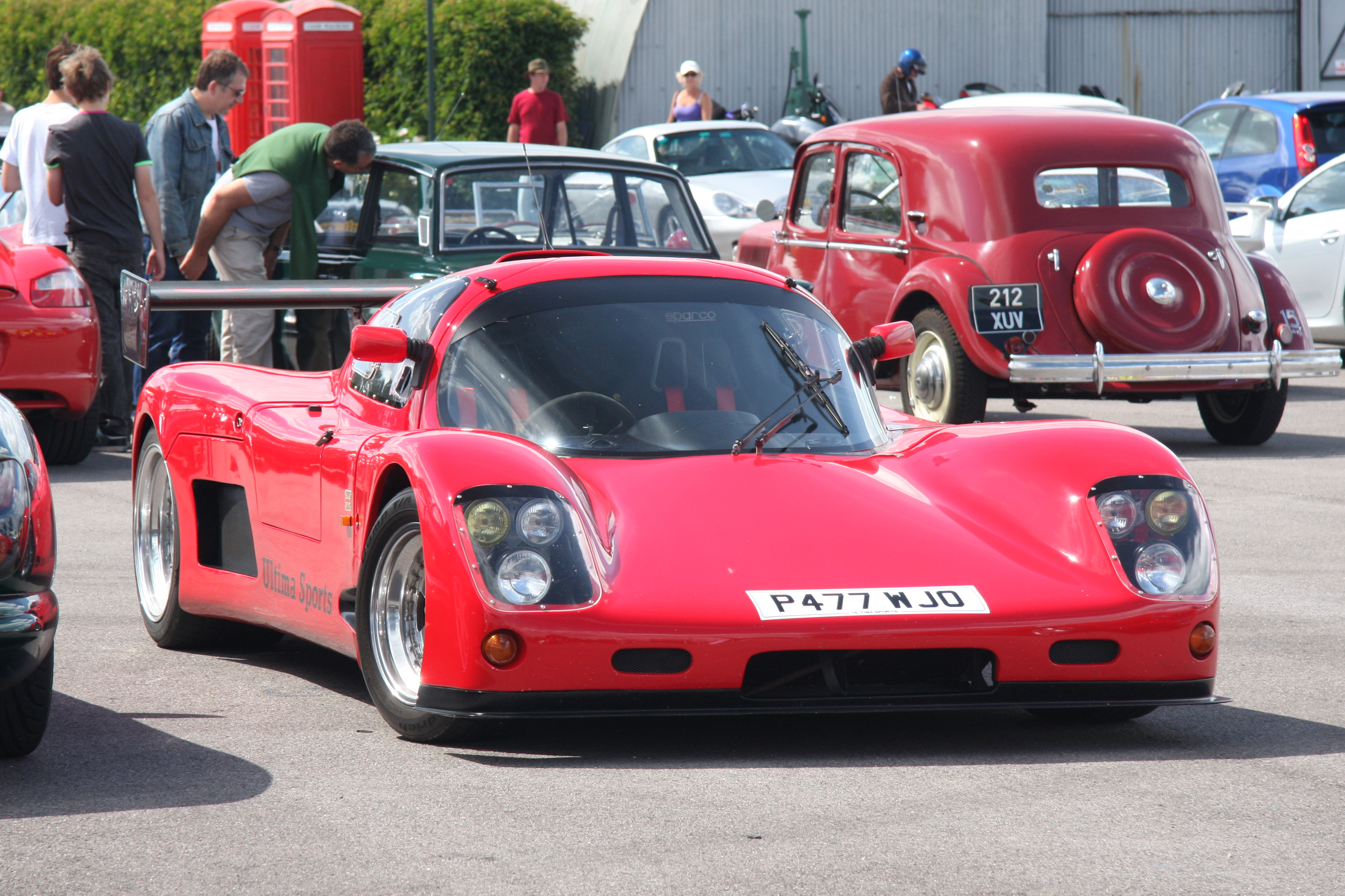

Overview
- Manufacturer: Ultima Sports Ltd
- Also called: Ultima Spyder
- Production: 1992–1999
- Assembly: United Kingdom: Hinckley, Leicestershire
- Designer: Lee Noble and Ted Marlow

Body and chassis
- Class: Sports car (S)
- Body style: 2-door coupé 2-door roadster
- Layout: Rear mid-engine, rear-wheel drive
- Doors: Butterfly

Powertrain
- Engine: See Table
- Transmission: 5 or 6-speed manual

Dimensions
- Wheelbase: 2,540 mm (100.0 in)
- Length: 3,880 mm (152.8 in)
- Width: 1,850 mm (72.8 in)
- Height: 1,000–1,100 mm (39.4–43.3 in)
- Kerb weight: 850–990 kg (1,874–2,183 lb)

Chronology
- Predecessor: Ultima Mk3
- Successor: Ultima GTR

Ultima Sport and Ultima Spyder are sports cars built by (then) British kit-car manufacturer Ultima Sports Ltd. They are of a can-am design, with GRP bodywork set atop a bespoke chassis meant to accommodate a variety of engines from four to eight cylinders, or rotaries. The design is of a mid-engined, rear wheel drive layout, with a tubular steel space frame chassis. Originally meant as a kit car, Ultima began producing its first turn-key examples during the production run of the Sports/Spyder (the first such car being completed in 1993).

== History ==
The Ultima Sport and its roadster derivative, the Ultima Spyder, were built from 1992 to 1998. The body styles were significantly altered for the succeeding Ultima GTR and Ultima Can-Am (roadster) models. The Sport, sometimes referred to as the Mk4 in company literature, followed on the Mk1 (1983), the Mk2 (1984), and the Mk3 (1989). The Mk2 was based on the Mk1 but with new suspension and better brakes, while the Mk3 received a new body. Ted Marlow and Richard Marlow bought the rights to the car in 1992 and started building a revised model called the Ultima Sport. Two examples of the earlier Mk3 had been used by McLaren in testing their upcoming F1; one to test the gearbox and central seating position ("Albert", chassis number 12) and the other car to test the BMW V12 engine and ancillaries ("Edward", number 13). This was frequently mentioned in Ultima's company literature and period reviews.

The Ultima Sport used a developed version of the Mk3 bodywork, with larger headlamp openings which held three lights rather than the single units of the Mk3. A large rear spoiler, incorporated into the rear bodywork, became an available option in 1993, while power assisted brakes only became available in 1997. The Spyder was new; this roadster variant offered a cut-down windshield and minimal protection from the elements. Originally introduced in 1993, it was first intended as a lower-cost example and Ultima expected buyers to opt for the Rover V8 and a Renault transaxle; customer demand, however, meant that Chevrolet small-block V8s were typically fitted instead. While a variety of engines could be fitted, in latter years Chevrolet's 5.7-litre small-block V8 became dominant. For buyers of the fully built-up models, the choice of engine was restricted to this engine, in three grades of performance with either 345, 430, or 500 hp (254, 316, or 368 kW) depending on the state of tune. The chassis was designed to hold as much as 1,000 bhp (750 kW; 1,000 PS), however no version actually came with that much power.

== Engines ==
The Ultima Spyder was launched in 1993 initially as a softer version of the Sport, coming with a smaller 3.5-litre Rover V8, instead of the 5.7-litre Chevrolet small-block V8, but due to customer demand, the Spyder would be fitted with the Chevrolet small-block V8 in 1994. In 1995, Ultima would produce a prototype Ultima Sport made entirely of carbon-fiber, bringing the weight to 600 kg (1,300 lb) with the Rover V8 engine, which would weigh 850 kg (1,870 lb) with the standard aluminium body. This would be far too expensive to produce, and carbon-fiber would be shelved until the Ultima RS. For 1995, Ultima would produce a new engine mount system designed specifically for rotary engines, but this would be an unpopular option, with less than 30 being made with this option from factory. There would not be an official inline 4 option from factory, even though the prototype of the Ultima Sport would feature a turbocharged Ford-Cosworth YB I4, from a Darrian T90. The 5.7 would be tuned for 345 bhp (350 PS; 257 kW), as they were unmodified crate engines. The Rover V8s would be standard surplus purchases, with only a new exhaust system, would produce 230 bhp (230 PS; 170 kW). The Renault PRV V6 turbocharged engine would produce 311 bhp (315 PS; 232 kW), but can produce as much as 400 bhp (410 PS; 300 kW) by increasing boost pressure. Below is all engines sold from the factory, however, the customer could order the car as a shell (without engine nor transmission).

Displacement	Engine	Horsepower	Horsepower RPM	Torque	Torque RPM	Weight (Sport)	Weight (Spyder)	Ref
1,993 cc (121.6 cu in; 2.0 L)	Ford-Cosworth YB I4 turbocharged (Prototype only)	470 bhp (477 PS; 350 kW)	6,650	550 N⋅m (406 lb⋅ft)	4,000	850 kg (1,870 lb)	N/A	
5,733 cc (349.8 cu in; 5.7 L)	Chevrolet Small-block V8	295 bhp (299 PS; 220 kW)	5,600	480 N⋅m (354 lb⋅ft)	3,400	990 kg (2,180 lb)	940 kg (2,070 lb)	
6,200 cc (378.3 cu in; 6.2 L)	Chevrolet Small-block V8	345 bhp (350 PS; 257 kW)	5,600	515 N⋅m (380 lb⋅ft)	3,400	990 kg (2,180 lb)	940 kg (2,070 lb)	
3,528 cc (215.3 cu in; 3.5 L)	Rover V8	230 bhp (233 PS; 172 kW)	5,600	271 N⋅m (200 lb⋅ft)	3,000	850–910 kg (1,870–2,010 lb) (600 kg (1,300 lb) for the Carbon Fiber Body)	850 kg (1,870 lb)	
1,308 cc (79.8 cu in; 1.3 L)	Mazda 13B-DEI Rotary	197 bhp (200 PS; 147 kW)	6,500	187 N⋅m (138 lb⋅ft)	3,500	850 kg (1,870 lb)		
2,975 cc (181.5 cu in; 3.0 L)	Renault PRV V6 Turbo	311 bhp (315 PS; 232 kW)	5,800	360 N⋅m (266 lb⋅ft)	2,900	900 kg (2,000 lb)	850 kg (1,870 lb)	

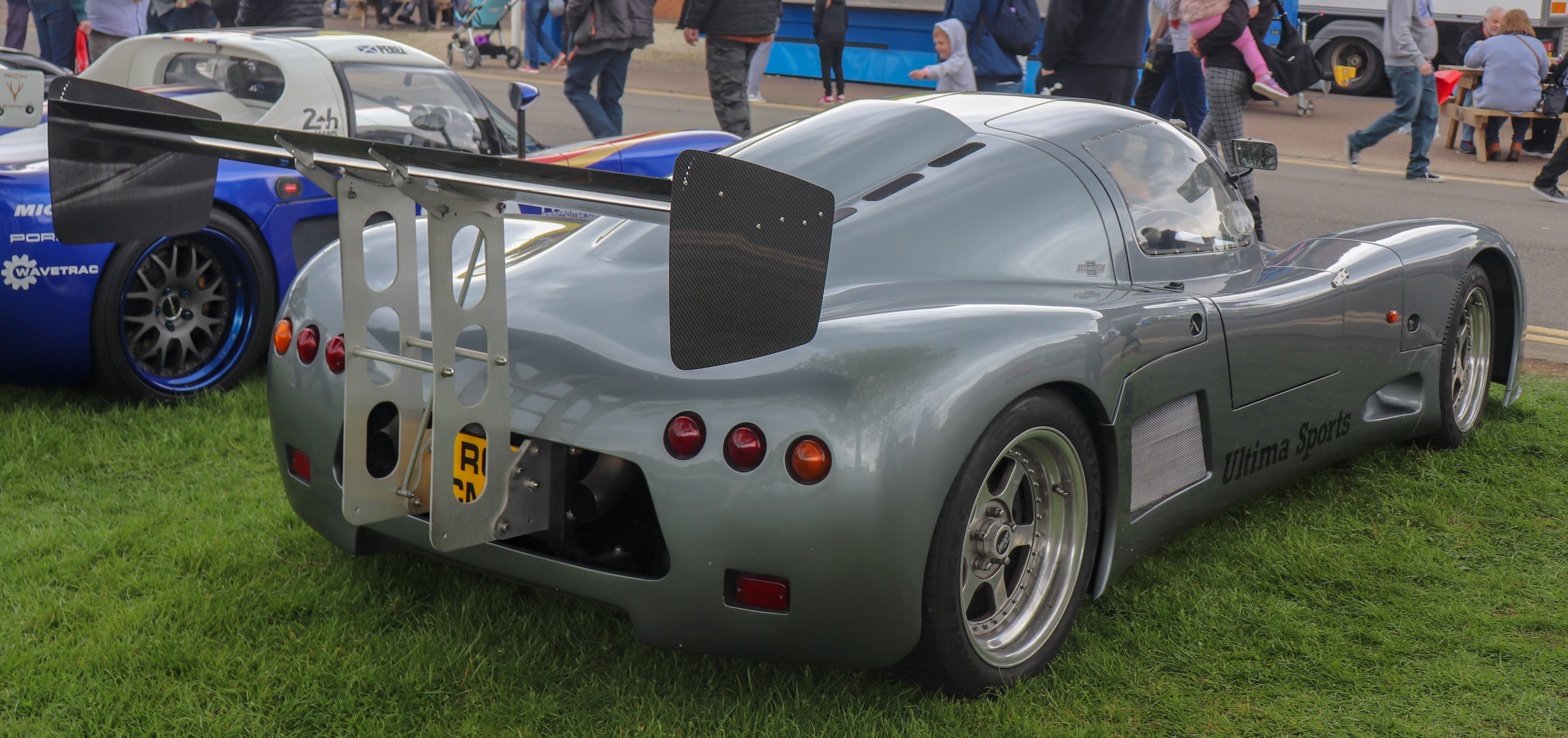
Rear view; this was squared off for the succeeding GTR to provide more downforce

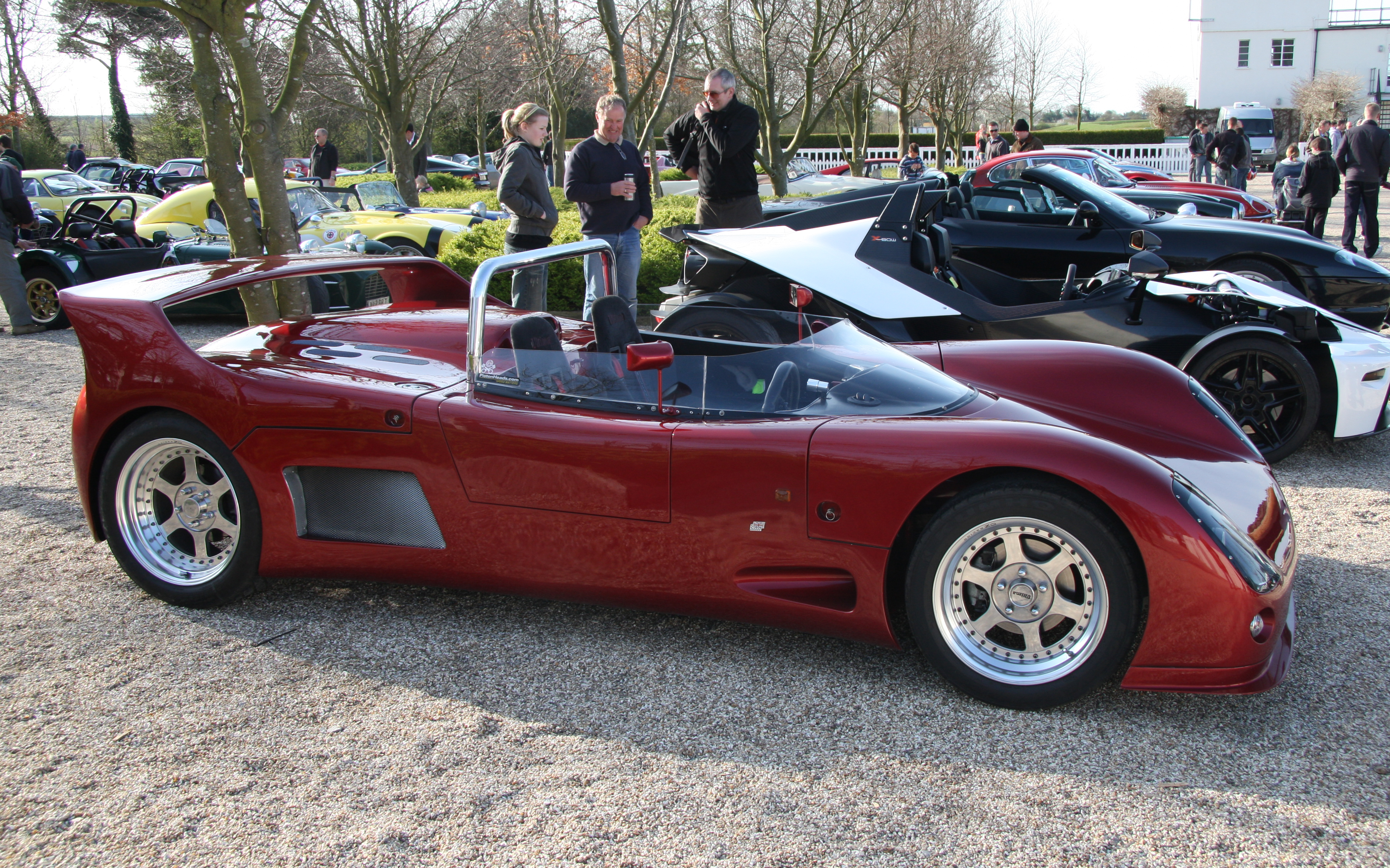
The Ultima Spyder was the roadster version, with a cut down windshield and a minimum of creature comforts
