= Ascari Ecosse =

Sports car

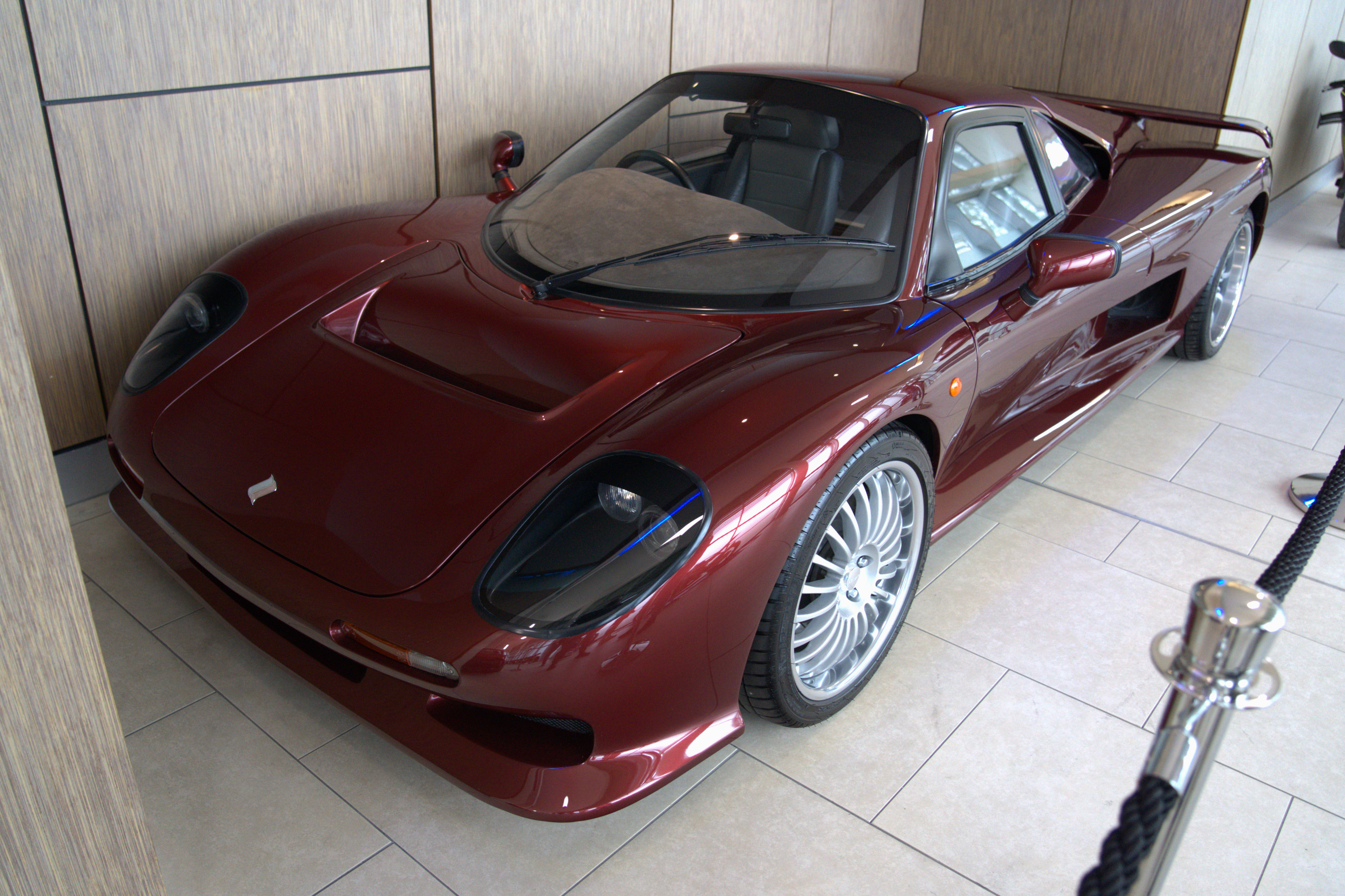

Overview
- Manufacturer: Ascari Cars
- Production: 1995–1997 (FGT race car); 1998–1999; 17 produced
- Assembly: Blandford, England
- Designer: Lee Noble

Body and chassis
- Class: Sports car (S)
- Body style: 2-door coupe
- Layout: Rear mid-engine, rear-wheel drive
- Related: Ascari FGT

Powertrain
- Engine: 6.0 L Chevrolet V8 (concept); 4.4 L Hartge tuned BMW V8; 4.7 L Hartge tuned BMW V8; 5.0 L Hartge V8
- Transmission: 5-speed manual 6-speed sequential

Dimensions
- Wheelbase: 2,850 mm (112.2 in)
- Length: 4,280 mm (168.5 in)
- Width: 1,828 mm (72.0 in)
- Height: 1,120 mm (44.1 in)
- Curb weight: 1,250 kg (2,756 lb)

Chronology
- Successor: Ascari KZ1

The Ascari Ecosse is a mid-engined sports car produced by Ascari Cars from 1998 to 1999. It was the first production car released by the company and is essentially the production version of the Ascari FGT concept race car.

== FGT ==
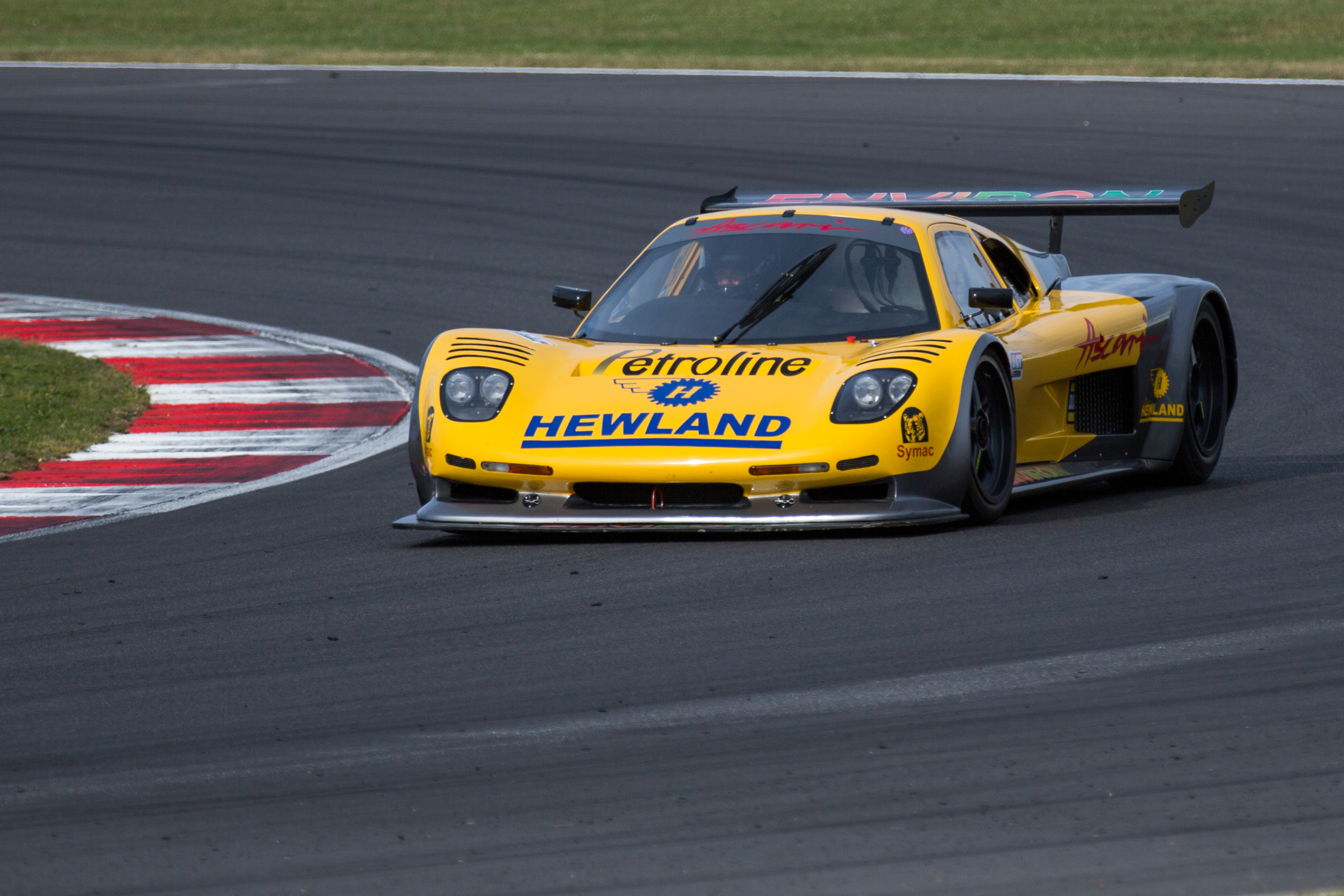
Ascari FGT

In 1995, Ascari introduced the FGT at various European motor shows, designed by Lee Noble. It featured a 6.0 L mid-mounted Chevrolet fuel injected V8 engine.

At the same time as the launch of the car, Klaas Zwart, a Dutch racing driver, expressed interest in the car and ended up buying the entire company, along with the design rights of the car. The new owner of the company chose to enter the FGT in racing. The race car featured a Ford Modular V8 engine and was entered in the British GT Championship. With the sole car produced meeting the homologation requirements, Zwart won an event at Silverstone Circuit in the car's debut season of 1995. The car also attempted to qualify for the 24 Hours of Le Mans, but was not fast enough to pass pre-qualifying. The car continued to maintain pace with newcomers to British GT Championship in 1996, before Zwart partnered with William Hewland, owner of Hewland engineering, for a partial season in 1997, with only a best finish of fourth at Donington Park.

Following the 1997 season, Ascari built 17 production versions of the FGT, dubbed the Ecosse.

== Ecosse ==
The Ecosse was unveiled by Ascari at the 1999 Earls Court Motor Show. The Ecosse was given a BMW V8 engine in place of the Chevrolet and Ford units used in the FGT, although the engine was further tuned by Hartge. The 4.4 L engine produces around 300 hp (304 PS; 224 kW), while later larger 4.7 L units produced around 400 hp (406 PS; 298 kW).

The last three cars were fitted with the Hartge 5.0 litre V8 engine based on the 4.4 L BMW unit. The new engine produced around 420 hp (426 PS; 313 kW) and 520 N⋅m (384 lb⋅ft) of torque. The last car was built at Blandford in 2000 with a sequential manual transmission.

The spaceframe chassis and wishbone suspension carry a lightweight fibreglass body, weighing 1,250 kg (2,756 lb). The Ecosse, with the larger 4.7 litre engine, can accelerate from 0–60 mph (0–97 km/h) in 4.1 seconds, while top speed is measured to be 200 mph (322 km/h). Only 17 were produced.

The Ecosse was replaced by the Ascari KZ1 in 2003.
