= Ultima Mk2 =

Kit car

Ultima MK2

Overview
- Manufacturer: Ultima Sports Ltd
- Also called: Ultima Mk3
- Production: 1984–1989
- Assembly: United Kingdom: Hinckley, Leicestershire
- Designer: Lee Noble

Body and chassis
- Body style: Coupe
- Layout: Mid engine, RWD
- Chassis: Space frame
- Related: Ultima Mk1

Powertrain
- Engine: see table
- Transmission: 4/5 Speed Manual

Dimensions
- Wheelbase: 2,640 millimetres (104 in)
- Length: 4,000 millimetres (160 in)
- Width: 1,840 millimetres (72 in)
- Height: 1,200 millimetres (47 in)
- Curb weight: 800–1,000 kilograms (1,800–2,200 lb)

Chronology
- Predecessor: Ultima Mk1
- Successor: Ultima Mk3

The Ultima Mk2 and the Ultima Mk3 are sports kit cars that were produced by English automobile manufacturer Ultima Sports Ltd from 1984 to 1989, and 1989 to 1992 respectively.

== Ultima Mk2 ==
This is The second model produced by the company, with a total of 13 cars would be produced. Two of the produced cars were MK2 5000 race cars. The car would use an evolved steel square-tubed chassis, developed from the Mk1. Ted Marlow, the eventual cofounder of Ultima Sports Ltd would buy the first Mk2, as specified with the original Essex V6. The Mk2 would eventually go racing under the "Ultima Mk2 5000" moniker, using an unused Formula 5000 Cooper-Chevrolet Small-Block V8, where they would find success, winning a huge number of races.

=== Mk2 Factory Specifications ===
Displacement	Engine	Horsepower	Torque	Weight	Ref
3.1 L (3,098 cc; 189 cu in)	Ford Essex V6 (Original Prototype)	148 bhp (150 PS; 110 kW) at 5,000 rpm	254 N⋅m (187 lb⋅ft) at 3,000 rpm	845 kg (1,863 lb)	
5.7 L (5,733 cc; 350 cu in)	Chevrolet Small-Block V8 (UK Tune)	255 bhp (259 PS; 190 kW) at 5,500 rpm	447 N⋅m (330 lb⋅ft) at 4,100 rpm	900 kg (2,000 lb)	
5.7 L (5,733 cc; 350 cu in)	Chevrolet Small-Block V8 (US Tune)	345 bhp (350 PS; 257 kW) at 5,500 rpm	475 N⋅m (350 lb⋅ft) at 4,100 rpm	900 kg (2,000 lb)	
5.7 L (5,733 cc; 350 cu in)	Chevrolet Small-Block V8 (Race Tune)	475 bhp (482 PS; 354 kW) at 6,000 rpm	610 N⋅m (450 lb⋅ft) at 5,000 rpm	900 kg (2,000 lb)	
6.2 L (6,200 cc; 378 cu in)	Chevrolet Small-Block V8 (Road Tune)	400 bhp (406 PS; 298 kW) at 5,000 rpm	533 N⋅m (393 lb⋅ft) at 3,000 rpm	1,000 kg (2,200 lb)	
6.2 L (6,200 cc; 378 cu in)	Chevrolet Small-Block V8 (Race Tune)	560 bhp (568 PS; 418 kW) at 5,500 rpm	740 N⋅m (546 lb⋅ft) at 3,500 rpm	1,000 kg (2,200 lb)	
5.0 L (4,999 cc; 305 cu in)	Cooper-Chevrolet Formula 5000 V8 (MK2 5000 race car only)	600 bhp (608 PS; 447 kW) at 9,000 rpm	700 N⋅m (516 lb⋅ft) at 5,300 rpm	800 kg (1,800 lb)	

== Ultima Mk3 ==
Ultima Mk3

Overview
- Manufacturer: Ultima Sports Ltd
- Also called: Mk3
- Production: 1989–1992
- Assembly: United Kingdom: Hinckley, Leicestershire
- Designer: Lee Noble

Body and chassis
- Body style: Coupe
- Layout: Mid Engine, RWD
- Chassis: Tubular Chassis

Powertrain
- Engine: see table
- Transmission: 5-speed Manual transmission

Dimensions
- Wheelbase: 2,640 millimetres (104 in)
- Length: 4,000 millimetres (160 in)
- Width: 1,800 millimetres (71 in)
- Height: 1,050 millimetres (41 in)
- Kerb weight: 900 kilograms (2,000 lb)

Chronology
- Predecessor: Ultima Mk2
- Successor: Ultima Sport

In 1989, the updated Mk3 replaced the Mk2. The Mk3 itself was heavily revised in 1992, becoming the Mk4 which was sold as the Ultima Sport. The Mk3 would make up half of Ultima sales by the end of its life because 13 of the 26 total Ultima Kits sold would be Mk3's. The car would be the final Ultima developed by Lee Noble. There would be a novel chassis made for the car, an Aluminium Tubular chassis, now fit exclusively with the Porsche G50 5-speed, used also in the Mk2. Ted Marlow and Lee Noble would establish Ultima Sports Ltd to build the Mk3. Even though the prototype of the Sport and the Mk3 RS Race Car would use an Inline 4 from a Darrian T90, there would be no standard option to have an Inline 4 in the Sport or Mk3.

Two Mk3 chassis were supplied by Noble Motorsport Ltd. to McLaren Cars in 1991 to serve as test beds for the McLaren F1. Both cars were crushed, however, a replica of Edward has since by built for Mouse Motors by Lanzante Limited using an original BMW S70 engine.

=== Mk3 Factory Specifications ===
Displacement	Engine	Horsepower	Torque	Weight	Ref
3.0 L (2,975 cc; 182 cu in)	Renault PRV V6 (prototype only)	311 bhp (315 PS; 232 kW) at 6,000 rpm	360 N⋅m (266 lb⋅ft) at 4,600 rpm	900 kg (2,000 lb)	
3.0 L (2,975 cc; 182 cu in)	Renault PRV V6 (main production version)	299 bhp (303 PS; 223 kW) at 6,000 rpm	330 N⋅m (243 lb⋅ft) at 4,600 rpm	900 kg (2,000 lb)	
5.7 L (5,733 cc; 350 cu in)	Chevrolet Small-Block V8	388 bhp (393 PS; 289 kW) at 5,750 rpm	530 N⋅m (391 lb⋅ft) at 4,250 rpm	900 kg (2,000 lb)	
6.2 L (6,200 cc; 378 cu in)	Chevrolet Small-Block V8	444 bhp (450 PS; 331 kW) at 5,500 rpm	630 N⋅m (465 lb⋅ft) at 3,500 rpm	900 kg (2,000 lb)	
2.0 L (1,993 cc; 122 cu in)	Ford-Cosworth YB I4 (turbocharged) (Mk3 RS)	510 bhp (517 PS; 380 kW) at 6,800 rpm	575 N⋅m (424 lb⋅ft) at 4,500 rpm	700 kg (1,500 lb)	
