= Darrian =

Darrian may refer to:

- The current name of British automobile manufacturer Davrian.
- Racquel Darrian, an American pornographic actress.
- Darrian Dalcourt (born 2000), American football player.
- Darrian "Kobee" Minor (born 2002), American football player
