= OZ Group =

Italian wheel manufacturing company

OZ S.p.A.
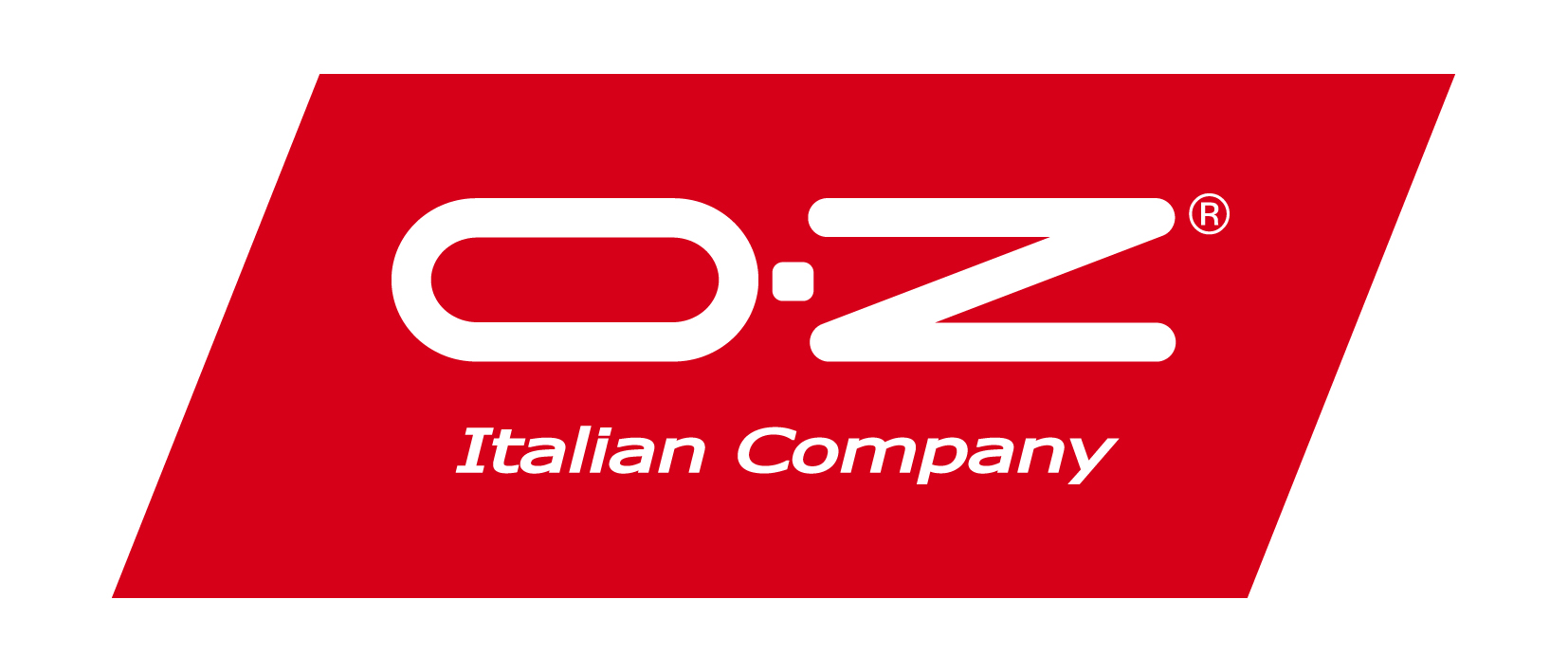
- Type: Private
- Industry: Automotive
- Founded: 1971; 55 years ago
- Founders: Silvano Oselladore & Pietro Zen
- Headquarters: San Martino di Lupari, Italy
- Number of locations: 6
- Key people: Claudio Bernoni (Managing director)
- Products: Alloy wheels
- Website: www.ozracing.com

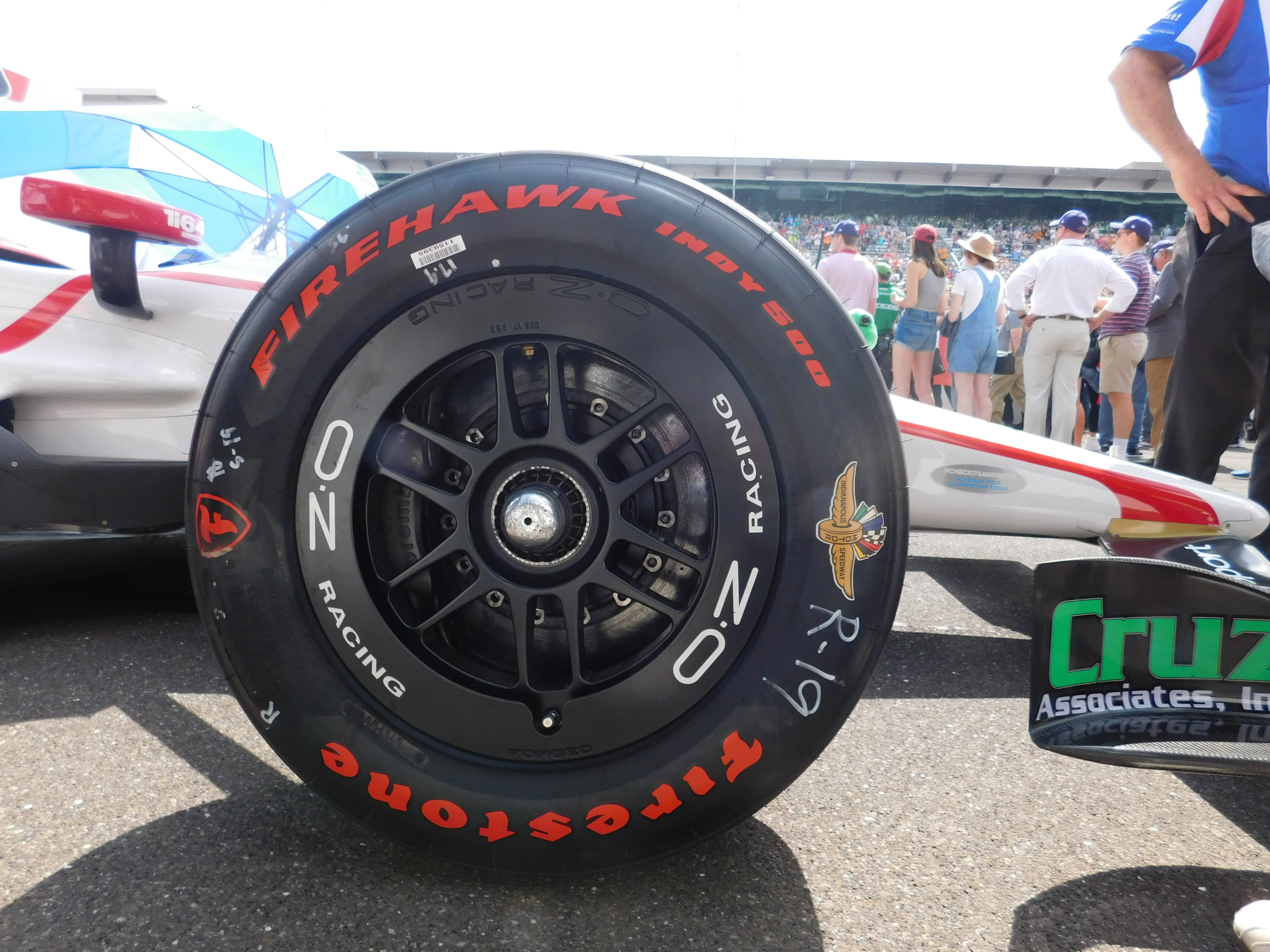
OZ racing wheels on an Indy car

OZ S.p.A., also known as OZ Group, is an Italian company founded in 1971 that produces car and motorcycle wheels, specifically alloy wheels. They are an OEM supplier to a number of manufacturers in addition to aftermarket sales and are a prominent wheel supplier in motorsport.

== History ==
The enterprise was founded in a filling station in Rossano Veneto near Venice in 1971 by Silvano Oselladore and Pietro Zen from whose initials the company takes its name. OZ S.p.A. was officially established as a company in 1978 following an investment by Carto Isnardo SpA. 1989 saw the company's first affiliate set up as OZ Japan began business. In 1992 the company moved to a new factory in its current headquarters location of San Martino di Lupari.

In 1999 OZ branched out into motorcycle wheel production in collaboration with Aprilia.

Today the company produces alloy wheels for motorsports, aftermarket and OEM applications in addition to motorcycle wheels and custom items for specialist tuners and designers including Bertone, Pininfarina, AMG and Hartge. OZ also produces wheels for Sparco in partnership with their compatriots. Their main competitor is BBS.

== Motorsport ==
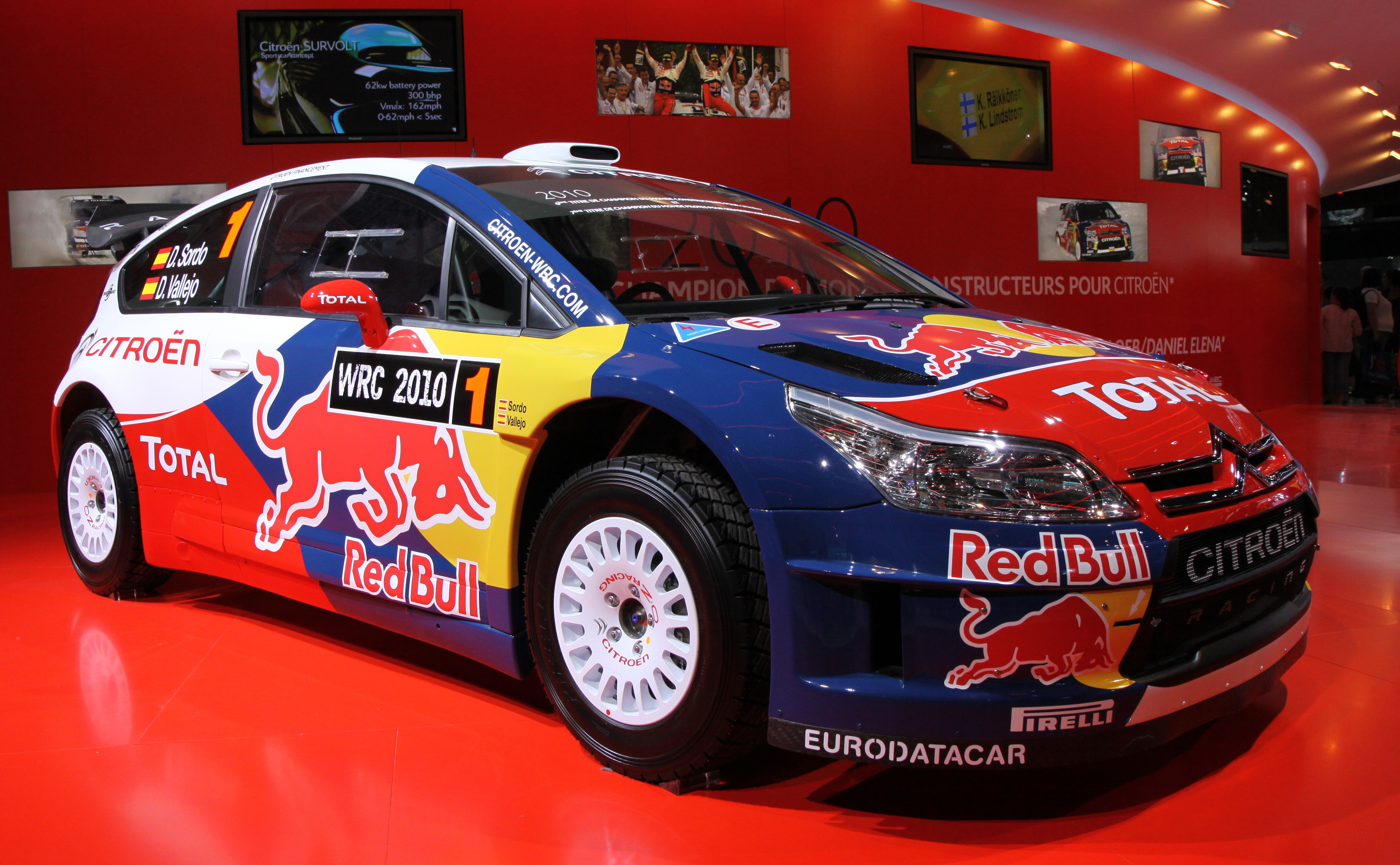
2010 Citroën C4 WRC car

OZ began their long-standing involvement with Formula One in 1984, supplying Riccardo Patrese and Eddie Cheever's Alfa Romeo team. In 1990 the company were wheel suppliers to the Toyota rally team as Carlos Sainz won his first World Rally Championship. In 1996 the OZ supplied Williams F1 team won the Formula One constructor's championship and driver Damon Hill won the drivers' championship. The following year, an OZ supplied car won the Indianapolis 500.

A second WRC championship victory this time with Peugeot in 2000 preceded a slew of victorious partnerships in 2001 as OZ became a premier motorsports wheel provider. While Peugeot again won the constructor's title in WRC, OZ also supplied the Subaru World Rally Team as Richard Burns won the driver's championship. The year also saw OZ supply teams winning the Indy 500 and Le Mans.

As of 2011, OZ currently supplies the F1 teams Red Bull Racing and Renault Sport, the Ford World Rally Team and the Audi sports car racing and DTM teams. They are exclusive suppliers to the FIA Formula 2 Championship, GP3 series and before its closure in 2010 the A1 GP series and supply 90% of WRC teams and 80% of IndyCar teams.

== See also ==
- List of companies of Italy
