= Ultima RS =

Kit car

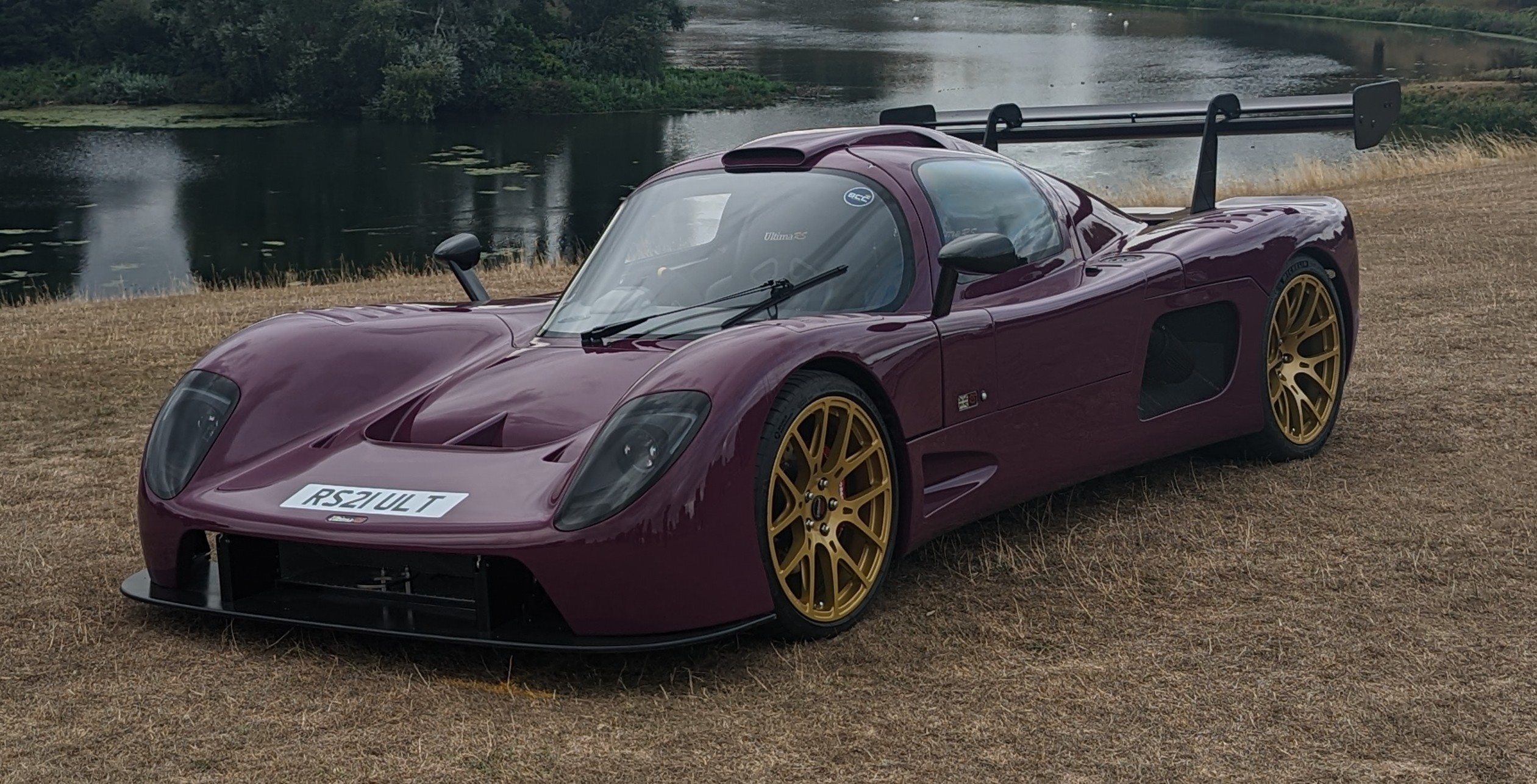

Overview
- Manufacturer: Ultima Sports Ltd
- Production: 2020–present
- Model years: 2021–present
- Assembly: United Kingdom: Hinckley, Leicestershire
- Designer: Steve Smith for Richard Marlow

Body and chassis
- Body style: 2-door coupe
- Layout: Mid engine, rear-wheel drive

Powertrain
- Engine: see table
- Transmission: 6-speed manual (Porsche 911)

Dimensions
- Wheelbase: 2,562 mm (101 in)
- Length: 4,170 mm (164 in)
- Width: 1,900 mm (75 in)
- Height: 1,125 mm (44 in)
- Curb weight: 930 kg (2,050 lb)

Chronology
- Predecessor: Ultima Evo

The Ultima RS is a mid-engined sports car produced by British automotive manufacturer Ultima Sports Ltd since 2021. The car can be bought as either a kit or fully-assembled. Buying the car as a self assembly package - without engine, transmission, or any factory options will cost £51,960. A complete LT5 or tuned LS3 car will cost circa £180,000, including 300 hours of labour to build. The company has now been sold to an American firm who will now only sell the car as a factory built option. It is still supported in the UK at this point.

== Ultima RSE Prototype ==
In 2023, Ultima built an RS with the electric motor from a Tesla, to develop a possible electric variant of the RS. The car was quick in comparison to the other variants of the RS. Ultima concluded that it would not enter production with an EV, especially with the news of internal combustion engine rules being gradually relaxed in multiple countries for low-volume car producers, and as such, it was sold to a private collector. The RSE was fitted with numerous carbon-fiber body panels, which lead it to weigh 988 kg (2,178.2 lb), only 58 kg (127.9 lb) more than the standard car. When tested by Ultima, the RSE achieved 0-60 mph (97 km/h) in 2.1 seconds, 0-100 mph (161 km/h) in 4.6 seconds, and 100-0 mph in 3.1 seconds. It has a claimed range of 136.8 km (85 mi). The car would be offered for sale in April of 2025 on Collecting Cars.

== Engines ==
Name	Engine	Displacement	Power	Torque	0-60 Mph	0-100 Mph	30-70 Mph	0-150 Mph	0-100-0 Mph	Standing quarter mile	Top Speed
RS-1200	LT5 V8 Supercharged	6,162 cubic centimetres (376.0 cu in)	1,200 bhp (895 kW; 1,217 PS)	969 N⋅m (715 lb⋅ft) @ 4,400 rpm	2.3s	4.8s	1.5s	8.9s	8.7s	9.2s @ 156 mph (251 km/h)	250 mph (402 km/h)+ (Gearing Limited)
RS-1020	LT4 V8 Supercharged	6,162 cubic centimetres (376.0 cu in)	1,020 bhp (761 kW; 1,034 PS)	920 N⋅m (679 lb⋅ft)	2.5s	5.2s	1.7s	10.1s	9.1s	9.8s @ 144 mph (232 km/h)	210 mph (338 km/h)+ (Gearing Limited)
RS-700	LT1 V8	6,162 cubic centimetres (376.0 cu in)	700 bhp (522 kW; 710 PS)	813 N⋅m (600 lb⋅ft)	3.0s	6.2s	2.3s	12.9s	10.1s	11.2s @ 127 mph (204 km/h)	180 mph (290 km/h)+
RS-500	LS3 V8	6,162 cubic centimetres (376.0 cu in)	480 bhp (358 kW; 487 PS)	610 N⋅m (450 lb⋅ft)	3.3s	6.6s	2.5s	13.6s	10.5s	11.6s @ 127 mph (204 km/h)	180 mph (290 km/h)+
RSE	Tesla based electric drive unit	N/A	680 bhp (507 kW; 689 PS)	1,000 N⋅m (738 lb⋅ft)	2.1s	4.6s	No data		7.7s	No data	
