= Ultima Evolution =

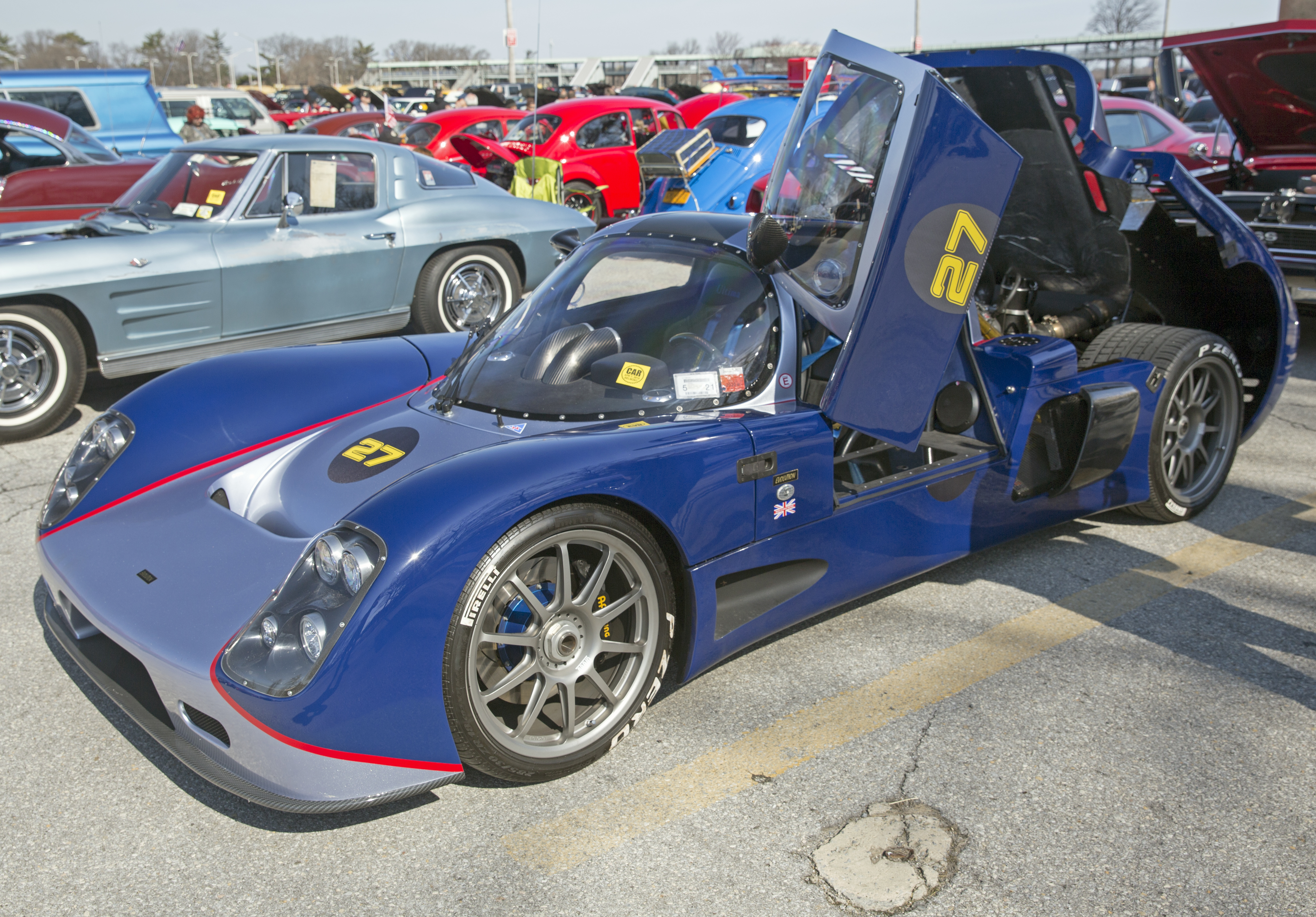

Overview
- Manufacturer: Ultima Sports Ltd.
- Production: 2015–present
- Assembly: United Kingdom: Hinckley, Leicestershire
- Designer: Richard Marlow

Body and chassis
- Class: Sports car (S)
- Body style: 2-door coupé; 2-door convertible
- Layout: Rear mid-engine, rear-wheel-drive
- Doors: Butterfly

Powertrain
- Engine: See Table
- Transmission: 6-speed manual

Dimensions
- Wheelbase: 2,560 mm (100.8 in)
- Length: 4,000 mm (157.5 in)
- Width: 1,850 mm (72.8 in)
- Height: 1,070 mm (42.1 in)
- Kerb weight: 950 kg (2,094 lb)

Chronology
- Predecessor: Ultima GTR
- Successor: Ultima RS

The Ultima Evolution is a limited production sports car built by British automobile manufacturer Ultima Sports. It was unveiled as the replacement for the Ultima GTR on 9 April 2015. It is sold both as a kit car, which the buyers build themselves, or as a complete vehicle, built at the factory, and is available in either a coupé or a convertible bodystyle. The range-topping supercharged LS-powered model is reported to cost £95,995 ($122,332).

== Specifications ==
=== Engine ===
The Evolution is powered by 3 different engines, all derivatives of the LS based GM small-block engine. The power outputs of these three engines are as follows:

- 6.2 L LS3 V8: 358 kW (480 hp)
- 7.0 L LS7 V8: 522 kW (700 hp)
- 6.8 L supercharged LS V8: 761 kW (1,020 hp) and 1,247 N⋅m (920 lb⋅ft)

The engine is mid mounted and the car has a rear-wheel-drive layout.

=== Transmission and suspension ===
The Evolution is equipped with a 6-speed manual transmission manufactured by Porsche and mounted longitudinally on the car. The car uses double wishbone suspension on the front and rear axles, with coilover springs that allow for adjustment of bump, rebound, and ride height.

=== Chassis ===
The car's chassis is a tubular steel space frame panelled with 5251 aluminum alloy, and has a built-in roll cage for structural rigidity and safety. The car's body is made out of glass-reinforced plastic, with optional carbon fibre wing mirrors and front splitter.

=== Wheels ===
The Evolution is equipped with 18-inch (460 mm) forged alloy wheels with an optional 19-inch (480 mm) upgrade available. The tyres are manufactured by Michelin with codes of 245/35 for the front and 335/30 for the rear. The brakes are vented discs, with a diameter of 323 mm (12.7 in) at the front and rear.

=== Interior ===
The Evolution's seats and dashboard are finished in leather and Alcantara depending on the selected options. In place of a center console, the Evolution features a large, stainless steel gear lever and handbrake. The in-car entertainment system and optional satellite navigation system are manufactured by Alpine Electronics.

== Performance ==
Below is a table of manufacturer-claimed performance values for the three different engine configurations of the Ultima Evolution.

Engine	Time (seconds)					Top speed	Power output	Power-to-weight ratio (kW/kg)
Engine	0–97 km/h (0-60 mph)	0–160 km/h (0-100 mph)	0–241 km/h (0-150 mph)	0–160-0 km/h	Quarter mile time	Top speed	Power output	Power-to-weight ratio (kW/kg)
6,162 cubic centimetres (376.0 cu in) V8 (LS3)	3.3	6.6	13.6	10.5	11.6 @ 127 miles per hour (204 km/h)	>180 miles per hour (290 km/h)	480 brake horsepower (490 PS) 450 pound force-feet (610 N⋅m)	0.38
6,997 cubic centimetres (427.0 cu in) V8 (LS7)	3.0	6.2	12.9	10.1	11.2 @ 131 miles per hour (211 km/h)	>180 miles per hour (290 km/h)	700 brake horsepower (710 PS) 600 pound force-feet (810 N⋅m)	0.55
6,997 cubic centimetres (427.0 cu in) Supercharged V8 (LS7)	2.5	5.2	10.1	9.1	9.8 @ 144 miles per hour (232 km/h)	>210 miles per hour (340 km/h) (Gearing Limited)	1,020 brake horsepower (1,030 PS) 920 pound force-feet (1,250 N⋅m)	0.8
