= Fenix Automotive =

British sports car manufacturer

- Company type: Private
- Industry: Automotive
- Founded: 2009
- Founder: Lee Noble
- Defunct: 2012
- Headquarters: Leicestershire, United Kingdom
- Products: Sports cars

Fenix Automotive Ltd was a British sports car manufacturer founded by Lee Noble in 2009. Lee Noble created the company ten years after the founding of his previous company Noble Automotive. Noble left Noble Automotive in the spring of 2008. Fenix was dissolved on 20 November 2012, after producing only one model.

== Projects ==
An unnamed car was under development and was revealed to the press in November 2009. The car was to have a V8 from the Corvette ZR1, lightweight, cost below £75,000 and was due for release near the end of 2010. It was to be manufactured in South Africa. The first images of the prototype car were released in January 2010. In September 2010, Lee Noble told a BBC reporter the Fenix sports car was preparing to move into production.

== See also ==
- Noble Automotive
- Lee Noble
- Automotive industry in the United Kingdom
