= Davrian =

Davrian Developments Ltd
- Company type: British Sportscar Manufacturer
- Industry: Automobiles
- Founded: 1967
- Founder: David Clarke and Adrian Evans (Dav-rian)
- Fate: Receivership
- Headquarters: Lampeter, Wales, United Kingdom

Davrian cars were built by Davrian Developments at 65 North Street, Clapham in London, England, from 1965 to 1976, in Tregaron, Dyfed, Wales from 1976 to 1980 and Lampeter, Dyfed, from 1980 to 1983.

Adrian Evans (d. 1992), a structural engineer and the car's designer, built a series of cars called Davrian from 1965, based on components from the Hillman Imp, including the front and rear suspension, the 875 or 998 cc (53.4 or 60.9 cu in) aluminium alloy Hillman Imp engine which was Coventry Climax-based and the Imp transaxle.

== Davrian 1965–83 ==
Davrian
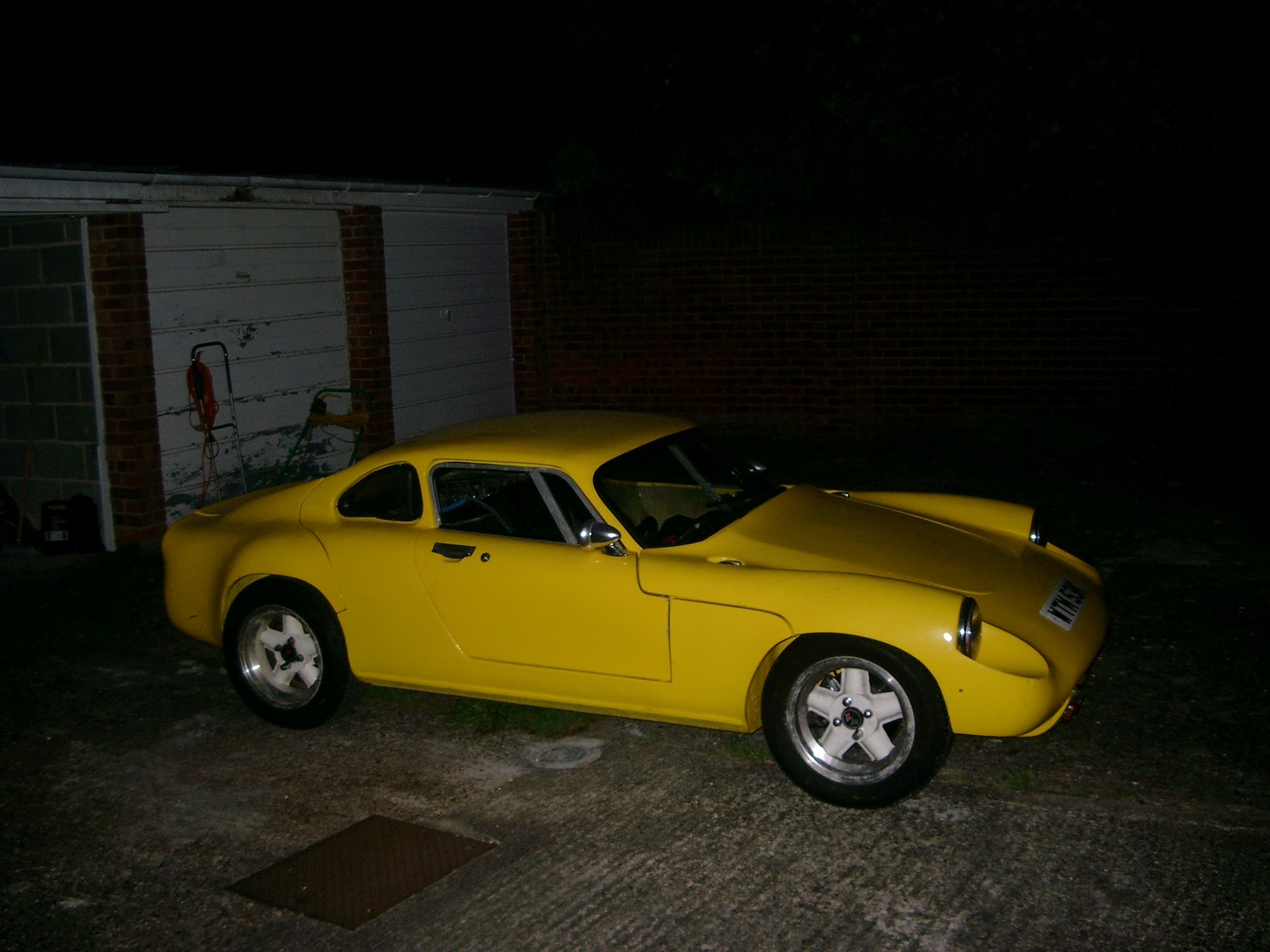

Overview
- Manufacturer: Davrian Developments

Powertrain
- Engine: 875 or 998 cc Hillman Imp

In 1967, the design had settled to a 2-seat glass fibre monocoque coupé, officially called the Davrian Imp and series production started with a company being formed called Davrian Developments. The cars were sold in kit form. Over time, a variety of power units were offered including the Mini-engined Davrian Demon (mid-mounted), Volkswagen Beetle Type 1 (rear-mounted), Renault (rear-mounted), and Ford Fiesta (mid-mounted). The car weighed in at 8 long cwt (900 lb; 410 kg).

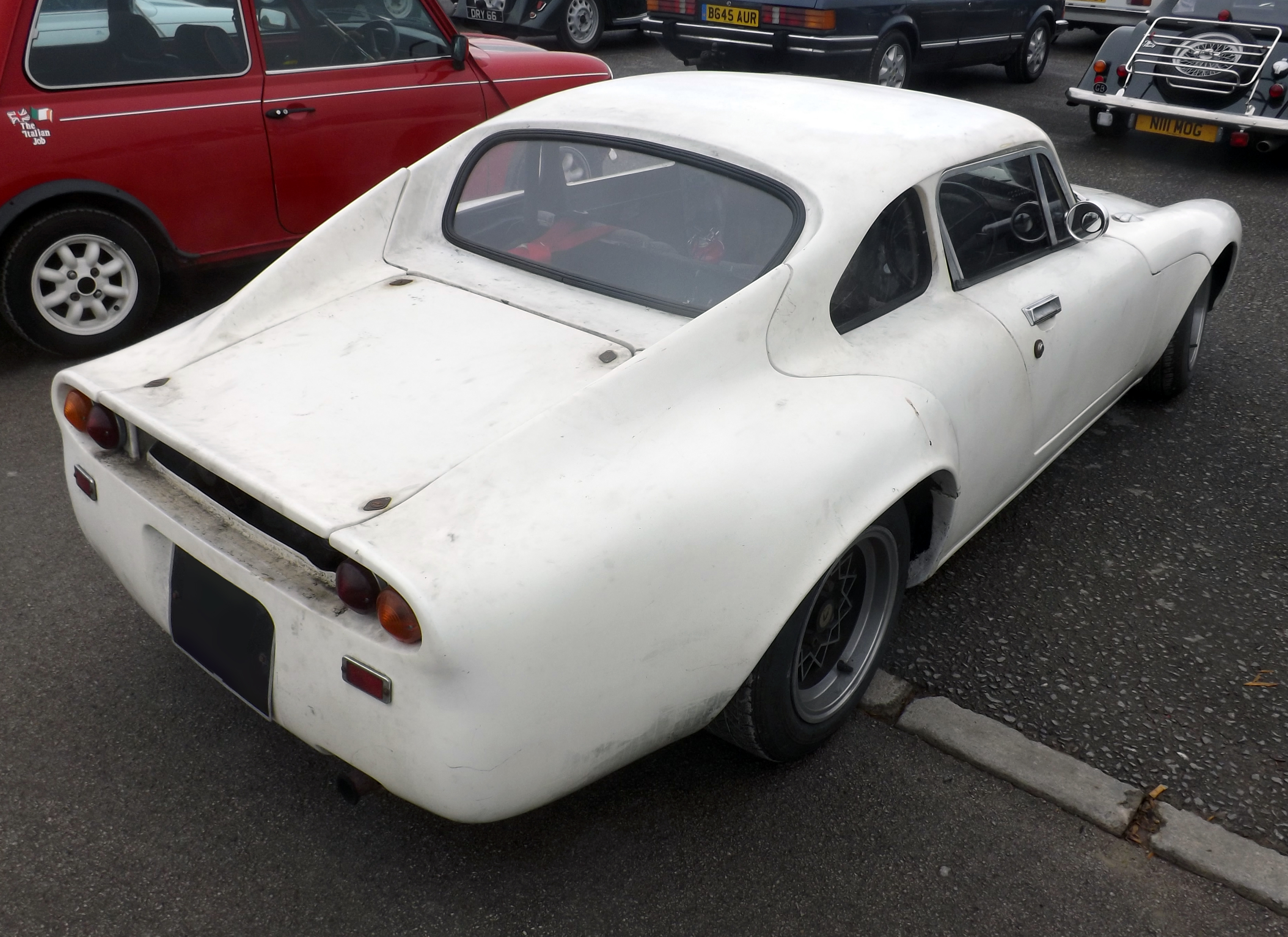
Rear view of a 1970 Davrian Mk. V

Over the years, a series of improvements led the cars to go through Marks 1 to 8. They proved very popular in amateur hands as rally and circuit racing cars.

In 1980, the Mk8 was offered as a complete car called the Davrian Dragon. This was mid-engined and used Ford Fiesta components and engine. The company was insufficiently capitalised for this operation, and went into receivership in 1983. This car was subsequently relaunched as the Corry and the earlier more basic versions continued being made in the same premises but under new ownership as the Darrian.

== Corry 1983–85 ==
The rights to the Dragon were bought by Will Corry and production transferred to Lisburn, Northern Ireland, to be built by the newly founded Corry Car Company. The body was restyled by Tony Stevens and the name changed to the Corry Cultra. Ford engines and were used and the suspension was based on that of the Mk III Cortina. The cars were mostly sold for competition use, but a few road-going versions were made.

== Darrian 1986 onwards ==
The Darrian was a revival of the original Davrian in the old factory. The body was considerably modified and the car became mid-engined. Like the Davrian, the Darrian is built using a glass-fibre composite monocoque body construction. The engine was usually from a Ford, but the Rover V8 or Vauxhall 16-valve units were options.

In 1996, Swansea Institute Team Darrian (SITD) took outright honours in the Privilege Insurance British GT Championship.

The company also built a limited number of replicas of the Renault Alpine A110 rally car, known as the Monte Carlo MC220 Berlinette.

Now based in Llangybi, near Lampeter and owned by Tim Duffee, Darrians continue to be built and raced with great success, performing many giant-killing acts. The current model is the Darrian T90 GTR, usually fitted with the Millington 2.5 16v 4-cylinder racing engine producing 300BHP, mated to a Hewland transaxle.
