= Darrian T9/T90 =

Sports race car

Darrian T9; Darrian T90; Darrian T90 GTR; Darrian T90 GTR+
- Category: GT2/GT3; GT1
- Constructor: Darrian Cars
- Production: T9 (1985-1989); T90 (1990-1999); T90 GTR (2000-2014); T90 GTR+ (2015-present)

Technical specifications
- Chassis: steel tubular spaceframe
- Suspension: double wishbones, push-rod actuated coil springs over shock absorbers, anti-roll bar
- Engine: See Table
- Transmission: Hewland FT220 5-speed manual (originally); Elite TXL 250 6-speed sequential
- Weight: 850–900 kg (1,870–1,980 lb)
- Brakes: Disc brakes
- Tires: Avon

Competition history

The Darrian T9, later evolved into the Darrian T90, is a purpose-built grand tourer-style race car, originally designed, developed and built by British manufacturer Davrian, since 1985. It competed in the GT3/GT2 and GT1 class of the British GT Championship, with Swansea Institute Team Darrian (SITD) taking outright honours in the Privilege Insurance British GT Championship, in 1996. Its modern evolution, the T90 GTR, has also competed as a rally car in various rallying events.

== Engine Options ==
Displacement	Engine Name	Horsepower	Torque
1,601 cc (97.7 cu in)	Ford-Cosworth BDA	217 bhp (162 kW; 220 PS) @ 9,500 rpm	175 N⋅m (129 lb⋅ft) @ 7,500 rpm
1,975 cc (120.5 cu in)	Ford-Cosworth BDG	276 bhp (206 kW; 280 PS)	280 N⋅m (207 lb⋅ft)
1,993 cc (121.6 cu in)	Ford-Cosworth YB (turbo) (Note: Engine derived from Ford Sierra Cosworth RS500)	470 bhp (350 kW; 477 PS)	550 N⋅m (406 lb⋅ft)
2,499 cc (152.5 cu in)	Millington S2 (turbo)	370 bhp (276 kW; 375 PS)	407 N⋅m (300 lb⋅ft)
1,993 cc (121.6 cu in)	Hart 420	305 bhp (227 kW; 309 PS)	260 N⋅m (192 lb⋅ft)
2,354 cc (143.6 cu in)	Honda K24 (turbo)	205 bhp (153 kW; 208 PS)	222 N⋅m (164 lb⋅ft)
2,264 cc (138.2 cu in)	Ford EcoBoost (turbo)	430 bhp (321 kW; 436 PS)	500 N⋅m (369 lb⋅ft)
2,000 cc (122.0 cu in)	Vauxhall XE	201 bhp (150 kW; 204 PS)	280 N⋅m (207 lb⋅ft)
