= British GT Championship =

Annual sports car racing series in the UK

- Category: Sports car racing
- Country: United Kingdom
- Inaugural season: 1993
- Classes: GT3 • GT4
- GT classes: Pro-Am • Silver • Silver-Am
- Manufacturers: Aston Martin • BMW M • Ferrari • Ginetta • Lamborghini • McLaren • Mercedes-AMG • Porsche
- Tyre suppliers: Pirelli
- Drivers' champion: GT3: (United Kingdom) Marcus Clutton (United Kingdom) Simon Orange; GT4: (United Kingdom) Darren Turner (United Kingdom) Daniel Lavery
- Teams' champion: GT3: (United Kingdom) Barwell Motorsport; GT4: (United Kingdom) Grange Racing by JSR
- Official website: www.britishgt.com

The British GT Championship is a sports car racing series based predominantly in the United Kingdom. The series was originally created by the British Racing Drivers' Club in 1993 and, for its first two seasons, was known as the National Sports GT Challenge. The series is currently run by the SRO Motorsports Group, while Pirelli began its first season as the championship's official sole tyre supplier in 2016.

Two classes currently compete in the championship: GT3 and GT4. A consolidation of GT regulations and significant manufacturer support saw British GT first introduce a GT3 class in 2005. The category later mirrored FIA Group GT3 and used near-identical regulations to the FIA GT3 European Championship from 2006 onwards. GT3 rules include extensive balance of performance and handicap weights to make cars artificially more equal. Cost-saving measures saw the series' previous premier class, GT2, phased out at the end of 2006.

The SRO GT4 class was adopted in 2008 intended as a development class towards GT3. Regulations governing GT4 ensure the cars more closely resemble their road-going counterparts than GT3 machines, to control cost. This replaced the previous unique-to-British GT GTC category. British GT has featured a number of other classes since its inception, including Group GT1.

== Champions ==
The following drivers have previously won the British GT championships in their respective classes. An overall championship for all classes combined was also awarded until 1998, and those champions are marked with italics.

Year	Class	Champion	Car
1993	A	(Australia) Charlie Cox	Ford Escort RS Cosworth
1993	B	(United Kingdom) Nigel Barrett	Porsche 911 SC
1993	C	(United Kingdom) John Greasley	Porsche 935 K3 009 0003 chassis replica
1993	D	(Denmark) Thorkild Thyrring	Lotus Esprit Sport 300
1994	A	(United Kingdom) Ross Hyett	Porsche 935 replica
1994	B	(Denmark) Thorkild Thyrring	Lotus Esprit Sport 300
1994	C	(United Kingdom) Nigel Barrett	Porsche 911 SC; Porsche 911 Carrera RS
1995	GT1	(Denmark) Thorkild Thyrring	De Tomaso Pantera
1995	GT2	(United Kingdom) Chris Hodgetts	Marcos LM600
1996	GT1	(United Kingdom) Ian Flux (United States) Jake Ulrich	McLaren F1 GTR
1996	GT2	(United Kingdom) David Warnock (United Kingdom) Robert Schirle	Marcos LM600
1996	GT3	(United Kingdom) Ken Thomson	Darrian T90
1997	GT1	(United Kingdom) John Morrison (United Kingdom) John Greasley	Porsche 911 GT1
1997	GT2	(United Kingdom) Steve O'Rourke (United Kingdom) Tim Sugden	Porsche 911 GT2
1997	GT3	(United Kingdom) Simon Tate	Marcos LM500
1998	GT1	(United Kingdom) Steve O'Rourke (United Kingdom) Tim Sugden	McLaren F1 GTR
1998	GT2	(United Kingdom) Kurt Luby (United Kingdom) Richard Dean	Chrysler Viper GTS-R
1999	GT1	(United Kingdom) Julian Bailey (United Kingdom) Jamie Campbell-Walter	Lister Storm GTL
1999	GT2	(United Kingdom) David Warnock	Porsche 911 GT2; Lister Storm
2000	GT	(United Kingdom) Calum Lockie	Marcos LM600
2000	GTO	(United Kingdom) Mark Sumpter	Porsche 911 GT3-R
2001	GT	(United Kingdom) David Warnock (United Kingdom) Mike Jordan	Lister Storm
2001	GTO	(United Kingdom) Kelvin Burt (United Kingdom) Marino Franchitti	Porsche 911 GT3-RS
2002	GT	(United Kingdom) Ian McKellar (Brazil) Thomas Erdos	Saleen S7-R
2002	GTO	(United Kingdom) Jamie Davies	Ferrari 360 N-GT
2003	GTO	(United Kingdom) Tom Herridge	Mosler MT900R
2003	GT Cup	(Republic of Ireland) Matt Griffin (United Kingdom) Patrick Pearce	Porsche 911 GT3 Cup
2004	N-GT	(United Kingdom) Jonathan Cocker	Porsche 911 GT3-RSR
2004	GT Cup	(Portugal) Ni Amorim (United Kingdom) Adam Wilcox	Ferrari 360 Challenge
2005	GT2	(United Kingdom) Andrew Kirkaldy (United Kingdom) Nathan Kinch	Ferrari 360 GTC
2005	GT3	(Greece) Dimitris Deverikos (United Kingdom) Piers Masarati	Porsche 911 GT3 Cup
2006	GT2	(Canada) Chris Niarchos (United Kingdom) Tim Mullen	Ferrari F430 GT2
2006	GT3	(Russia) Leo Machitski	Aston Martin DBRS9
2006	GTC	(United Kingdom) Matt Allison (United Kingdom) Jonny Lang	Porsche 911 GT3 Cup
2007	GT3	(United Kingdom) Bradley Ellis (United Kingdom) Alex Mortimer	Dodge Viper Competition Coupe
2007	GTC	(United Kingdom) Jamie Smyth (United Kingdom) Graeme Mundy	Porsche 911 GT3 Cup
2008	GT3	(United Kingdom) James Gornall (United Kingdom) Jon Barnes	Dodge Viper Competition Coupe
2008	GT4	(United Kingdom) Matt Nicoll-Jones (United Kingdom) Stewart Linn	Ginetta G50
2009	GT3	(United Kingdom) David Jones (United Kingdom) Godfrey Jones	Ascari KZ1-R
2009	GT4	(United Kingdom) Jody Firth	Ginetta G50
2009	SS	(United Kingdom) Marcus Clutton (United Kingdom) Phil Keen	KTM X-Bow
2010	GT3	(United Kingdom) David Ashburn	Porsche 997 GT3 R
2010	GT4	(United Kingdom) Christian Dick (United Kingdom) Jamie Stanley	Ginetta G50
2011	GT3	(United Kingdom) Glynn Geddie (United Kingdom) Jim Geddie	Ferrari 430 Scuderia GT3; Ferrari 458 Italia
2011	GT4	(United Kingdom) Peter Belshaw (United Kingdom) Marcus Clutton	KTM X-Bow
2012	GT3	(Switzerland) Daniele Perfetti (United Kingdom) Michael Caine	Porsche 997 GT3-R
2012	GT4	(United Kingdom) Jody Fannin (United Kingdom) Warren Hughes	Ginetta G50
2012	GTC	(United Kingdom) Gary Eastwood (United Kingdom) Ryan Hooker	Ferrari 458 Challenge
2013	GT3	(United Kingdom) Andrew Howard	Aston Martin V12 Vantage GT3
2013	GT4	(United Kingdom) Rick Parfitt Jr. (United Kingdom) Ryan Ratcliffe	Ginetta G50
2013	GTC	(United Kingdom) Andy Schulz (United Kingdom) Paul Bailey	Ferrari 458 Challenge
2014	GT3	(United Kingdom) Marco Attard	BMW Z4 GT3
2014	GT4	(United Kingdom) Jake Giddings (United Kingdom) Ross Wylie	Aston Martin V8 Vantage GT4
2015	GT3	(United Kingdom) Andrew Howard (United Kingdom) Jonathan Adam	Aston Martin V12 Vantage GT3
2015	GT4	(United Kingdom) Jamie Chadwick (United Kingdom) Ross Gunn	Aston Martin V8 Vantage GT4
2016	GT3	(United Kingdom) Derek Johnston (United Kingdom) Jonathan Adam	Aston Martin V12 Vantage GT3
2016	GT4	(United Kingdom) Graham Johnson (United Kingdom) Mike Robinson	Ginetta G55 GT4
2017	GT3	(United Kingdom) Rick Parfitt Jr. (United Kingdom) Seb Morris	Bentley Continental GT3
2017	GT4	(United Kingdom) Stuart Middleton (United Kingdom) Will Tregurtha	Ginetta G55 GT4
2018	GT3	(United Kingdom) Jonathan Adam (United Kingdom) Flick Haigh	Aston Martin V12 Vantage GT3
2018	GT4	(United Kingdom) Jack Mitchell	BMW M4 GT4
2019	GT3	(United Kingdom) Jonathan Adam (United Kingdom) Graham Davidson	Aston Martin Vantage AMR GT3
2019	GT4	(United Kingdom) Tom Canning (United Kingdom) Ashley Hand	Aston Martin Vantage AMR GT4
2020	GT3	(United Kingdom) Rob Collard (United Kingdom) Sandy Mitchell	Lamborghini Huracán GT3 Evo
2020	GT4	(United Kingdom) Jamie Caroline (United Kingdom) Daniel Vaughan	Aston Martin Vantage AMR GT4
2021	GT3	(Denmark) Dennis Lind (Russia) Leo Machitski	Lamborghini Huracán GT3 Evo
2021	GT4	(United Kingdom) Will Burns (United Kingdom) Gus Burton	BMW M4 GT4
2022	GT3	(United Kingdom) Ian Loggie	Mercedes-AMG GT3
2022	GT4	(United Kingdom) Sennan Fielding (United Kingdom) Richard Williams	Audi R8 LMS GT4
2023	GT3	(United Kingdom) Darren Leung (United Kingdom) Dan Harper	BMW M4 GT3
2023	GT4	(United Kingdom) Matt Cowley (United States) Erik Evans	Ford Mustang GT4
2024	GT3	(United Kingdom) Ricky Collard (United Kingdom) Rob Collard	Lamborghini Huracán GT3 Evo 2
2024	GT4	(United Kingdom) Jack Brown (United Kingdom) Zac Meakin	McLaren Artura GT4
2025	GT3	(United Kingdom) Charles Dawson (United Kingdom) Kiern Jewiss	Mercedes AMG GT3 Evo
2025	GT4	(United Kingdom) Jack Brown (United Kingdom) Marc Warren	McLaren Artura GT4
2026	GT3	(United Kingdom) Marcus Clutton (United Kingdom) Simon Orange	McLaren 720S GT3 Evo
2026	GT4	(United Kingdom) Darren Turner (United Kingdom) Daniel Lavery	Aston Martin Vantage GT4

#	Manufacturer (after 2024 season)
16	(Germany) Porsche
10	(United Kingdom) Aston Martin
7	(Italy) Ferrari (United Kingdom) Ginetta
4	(United Kingdom) Marcos (Germany) BMW (United Kingdom) McLaren
3	(Italy) Lamborghini
2	(Austria) KTM (United Kingdom) Lotus (United States) Dodge (United States) Ford (Germany) Mercedes-AMG

== See also ==
- British Formula Three Championship
- GT World Challenge Europe Endurance Cup
- GT World Challenge Europe Sprint Cup
- GT World Challenge Asia
- European Le Mans Series
- FIA World Endurance Championship
- Asian Le Mans Series
