= Millington Diamond engine =

Millington Diamond

Overview
- Manufacturer: Millington

Layout
- Configuration: I4, 16-valve, (four-valves per cylinder),
- Displacement: 2.0–2.8 L (122.0–170.9 cu in)
- Cylinder block material: Cast aluminium alloy
- Cylinder head material: Cast aluminium alloy
- Valvetrain: 16v DOHC

Combustion
- Fuel type: Petrol
- Oil system: Dry sump
- Cooling system: Water-cooled

Output
- Power output: 266–370 hp (198–276 kW)
- Torque output: 182–300 lb⋅ft (247–407 N⋅m)

Dimensions
- Dry weight: 83 kg (183 lb)

The Millington Diamond engine family is a series of four-stroke 2.0–2.8 L (120–170 cu in) DOHC 16-valve straight-four cylinder racing engines, designed, developed and built by Millington Racing Engines since 1990.
