= Ultima Sports Ltd =

Sports car manufacturer

Ultima Sports Ltd.
- Type: Automobile
- Industry: Automotive
- Founded: 1983
- Founders: Lee Noble
- Headquarters: Hinckley, Leicestershire, England, United Kingdom
- Website: ultimasports.co.uk

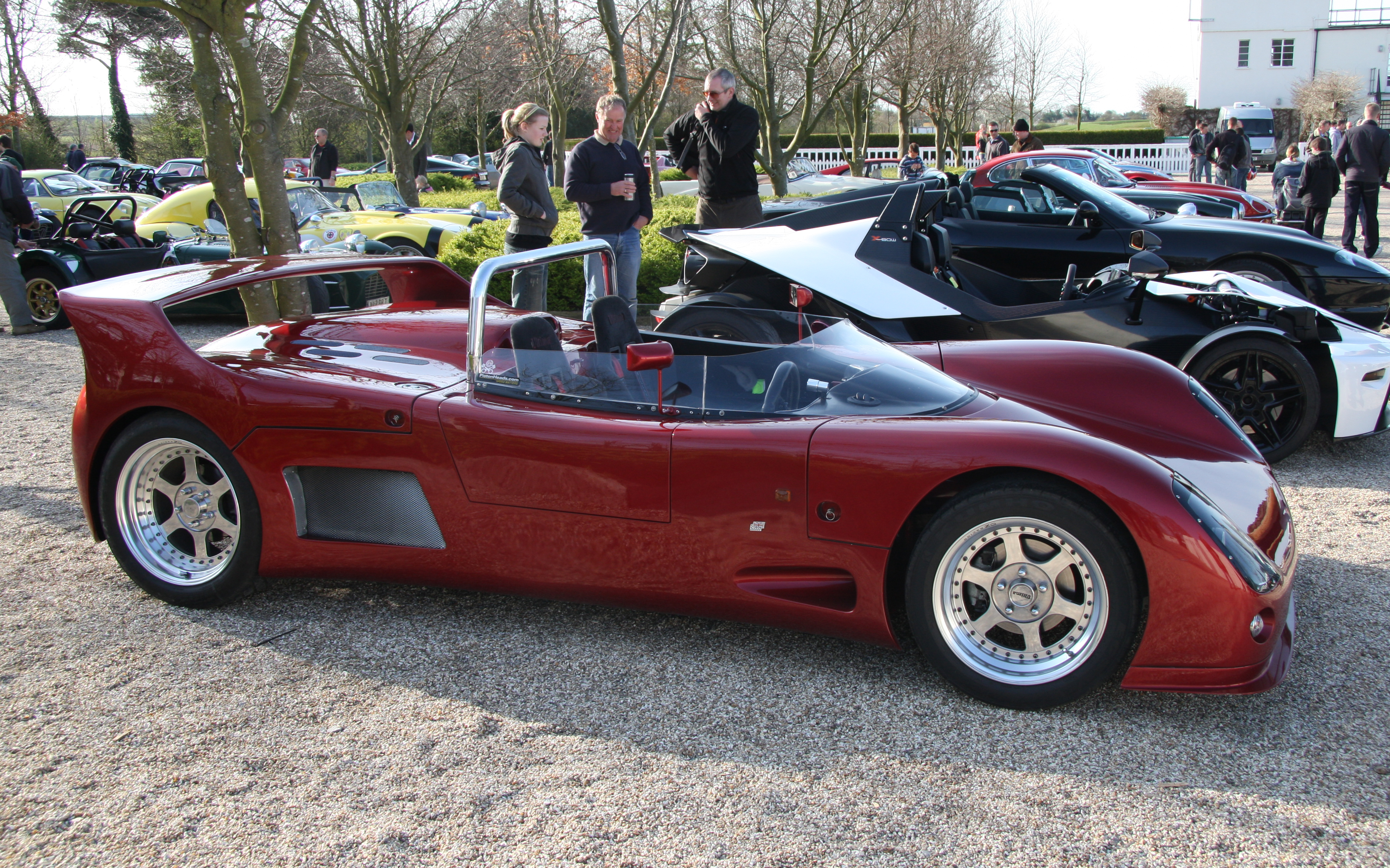
Ultima Spyder convertible

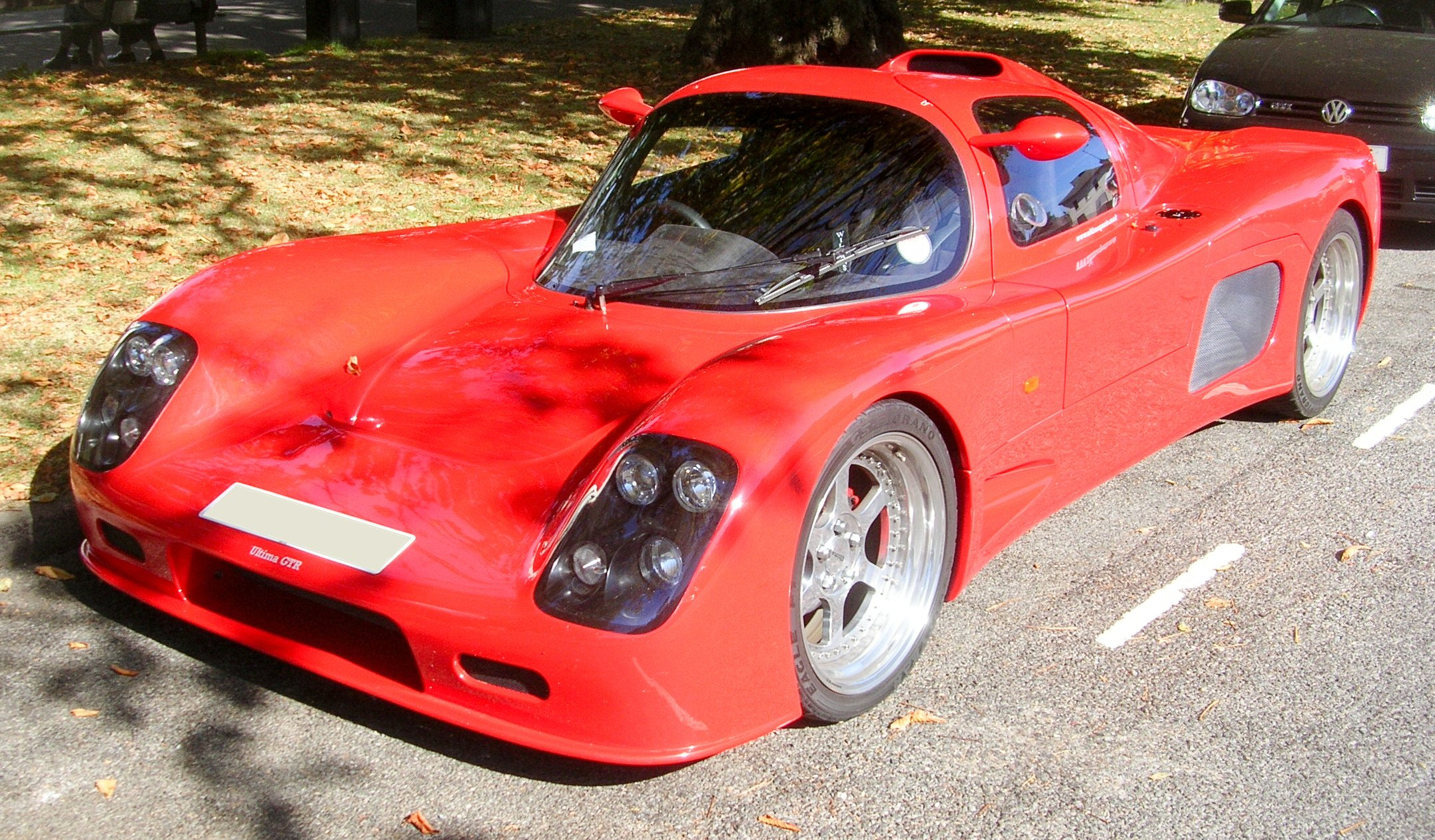
2005 Ultima GTR coupe

Ultima Sports Ltd. is an English sports car manufacturer based in Hinckley, Leicestershire.

== History ==
The first Ultima produced was the Ultima Mk1 produced in 1983 by Lee Noble of Noble Motorsports Ltd. None were sold before Lee Noble created the Ultima Mk2 in 1984, the only difference being that the parts taken from a Renault 30 (I.E. the engine and suspension) had slightly changed. The car now used, instead of the Renault parts, the rear suspension was replaced with Ultima's own Alloy Uprights.

== Vehicles ==
The company manufactures and distributes the Ultima Evolution car. The current Evolution is available in two body designs: coupé and convertible. The Ultima Evolution coupé and Ultima Evolution convertible have body styles unchanged from the preceding Ultima GTR and Ultima Can-Am models respectively. Before the GTR and Can-Am models, the two models produced were the Ultima Sport and Ultima Spyder.

The Ultima Sport and its roadster derivative, the Ultima Spyder, were built from 1992 to 1999. The body styles were significantly altered for the succeeding Ultima GTR and Ultima Can-Am (roadster) models. The first Ultima produced was the Ultima Mk1 produced in 1983 by Lee Noble of Noble Motorsports Ltd. The car was intended to go into production, but only one was produced because before any were sold, the Ultima Mk2 was introduced in 1989. The Mk2 is based on the Mk1 but features new suspension and better brakes. The car won many races and championships in smaller series, being driven by Noble and Ted Marlow. It was featured on the covers of Kitcars and Specials magazine, Sports Car Monthly Magazine, and Autochromes Magazine.

In total, 13 Ultima Mk2s were produced. The Ultima Mk3 was introduced in 1989, featuring a new fibreglass body but still powered by the same PRV V6. It was the last Ultima produced by Noble Motorsports Ltd. before Ted Marlow and Richard Marlow bought the rights to the car in 1992 and started building a revised model called the Ultima Sport, sometimes referred to as the Mk4 in company literature. Two Mk3s were used by McLaren in testing their upcoming F1 supercar; one to test the gearbox and central seating position ("Albert", chassis number 12) and the other car to test the BMW V12 engine and ancillaries ("Edward", number 13). Fifteen years later, McLaren used an Ultima GTR as a mule in testing the MP4-12C's linked hydraulic suspension and "brake steer" systems.

All models in the Ultima range have always been primarily supplied in component form. That is, Ultima produces the parts required for an owner-builder to construct the car off-site. This is the only way to receive such a vehicle in the US (including a "rolling body" fully constructed minus engine and transmission). However, cars are also manufactured onsite as "turnkey" models for the European market.

The preferred engine supplier for Ultima is currently American Speed, a company that specializes in re-engineering Chevrolet V8s for increased performance. It was with a 640 hp (480 kW) version of the Chevrolet small-block V8 built by American Speed, that company director Richard Marlow was able to set performance records in an Ultima GTR during 2005, this combination was known as the Ultima GTR640. The latest Evolution variant is being marketed with an American Speed 1,020 hp (760 kW) motor as the most powerful available from the factory.

In 2006, Ultima beat their own 0–100mph-0 record set in the GTR640 with the GTR720, again using an American Speed SBC engine but now with 720 hp (540 kW) of power. The new record reduced 0.4 seconds off the time completing 0–100–0 mph in 9.4 seconds, a new world record for a production road car with street-legal tires and exhaust.

All tests were recorded on road-legal tires in controlled conditions using a standard Ultima GTR720 and verified by an official from Datron Technology (Guinness World Records timekeepers) using Microsat GPS equipment.

The Ultima GTR720 has also recorded the quickest ever road-legal lap time around the Top Gear Test Track at 1 min 12.8 secs, albeit unofficially, but with an independent timekeeper and GPS timing gear present. The vehicle was also driven to and from the test track on the public roads as proof of its road-going ability. The same Ultima GTR720 also recorded an even quicker Top Gear Test Track lap time of 1 min 9.9 secs but this time fitted with slick racing tires to eclipse the 1 min 10.7 secs lap time of Michael Schumacher in his $1.8 million Ferrari FXX track car.

It has been suggested that with the substantial upgrades, the Ultima Evolution may go from 0–60 mph in 2.3 seconds, 0–100 mph in 4.9s, and 0–100-0 mph in 8.8s.
