= Ultima GTR =

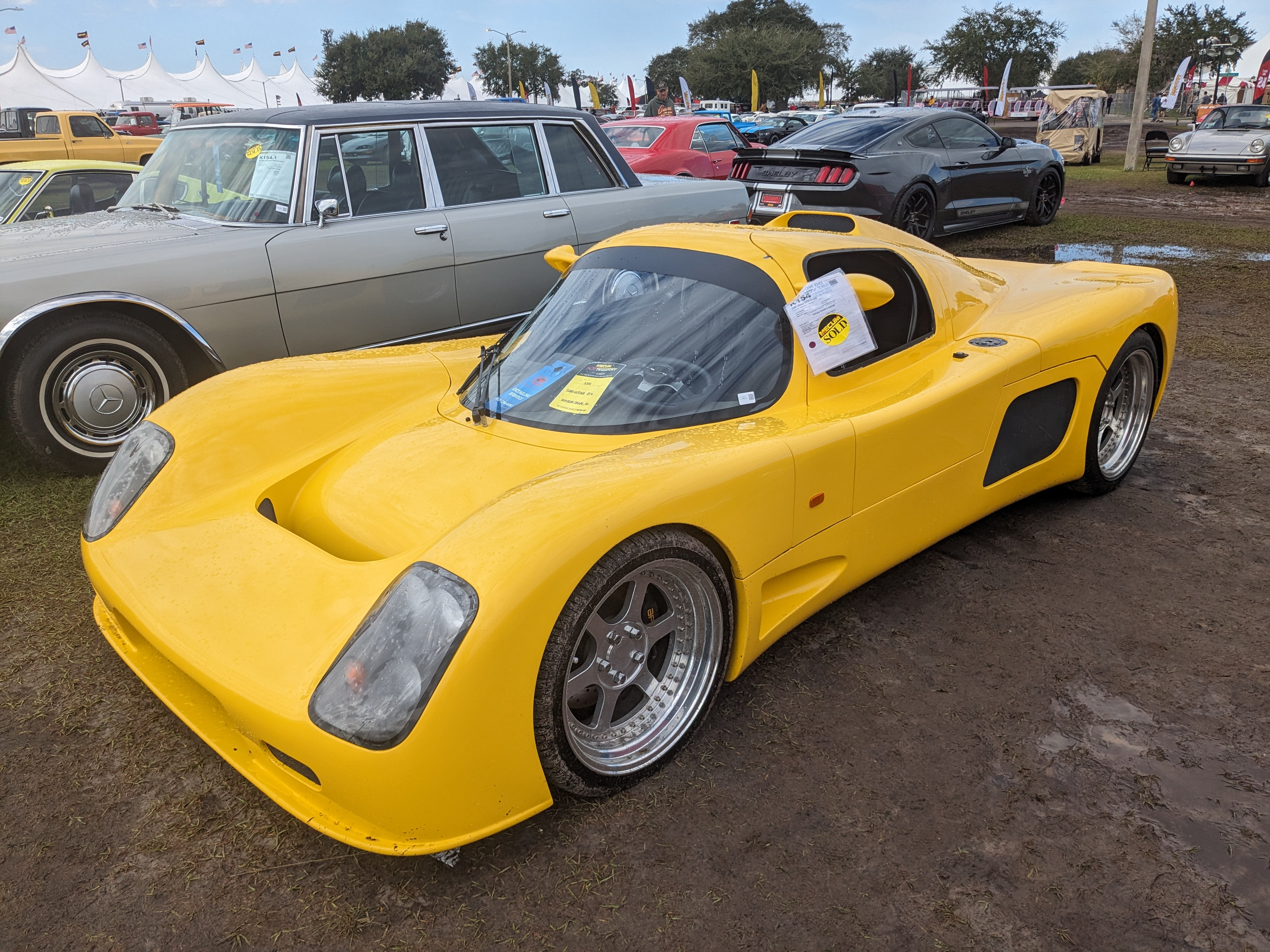

Overview
- Manufacturer: Ultima Sports Ltd
- Production: 1999–2016
- Assembly: United Kingdom: Hinckley, Leicestershire
- Designer: Ted Marlow and Richard Marlow

Body and chassis
- Class: Sports car (S)
- Body style: 2-door coupe
- Layout: Rear mid-engine, rear-wheel drive
- Doors: Butterfly

Powertrain
- Engine: See Table
- Transmission: 5 Speed Manual Porsche G50 transaxle; 6 speed Manual Porsche G52 transaxle

Dimensions
- Wheelbase: 2,560 mm (100.8 in)
- Length: 4,000 mm (157.5 in)
- Width: 1,850 mm (72.8 in)
- Height: 1,070 mm (42.1 in)

Chronology
- Predecessor: Ultima Sport
- Successor: Ultima Evolution

The Ultima GTR is a sports car manufactured by Ultima Sports Ltd of Hinckley, Leicestershire, England. The car was available both in kit form and as a "turnkey" (i.e. assembled by the factory) vehicle until early 2015, when it was replaced by the Ultima Evolution. The design is mid engined, rear wheel drive layout, with a tubular steel space frame chassis and GRP bodywork. A convertible version called the Ultima Can-Am was also produced. Kit builders were free to source and fit a variety of engines and transmissions but the Chevrolet small block V8 supplied by American Speed mated to either a Porsche or Getrag transaxle was the factory recommended standard, and this configuration was fitted to all turnkey cars.

== Performance ==
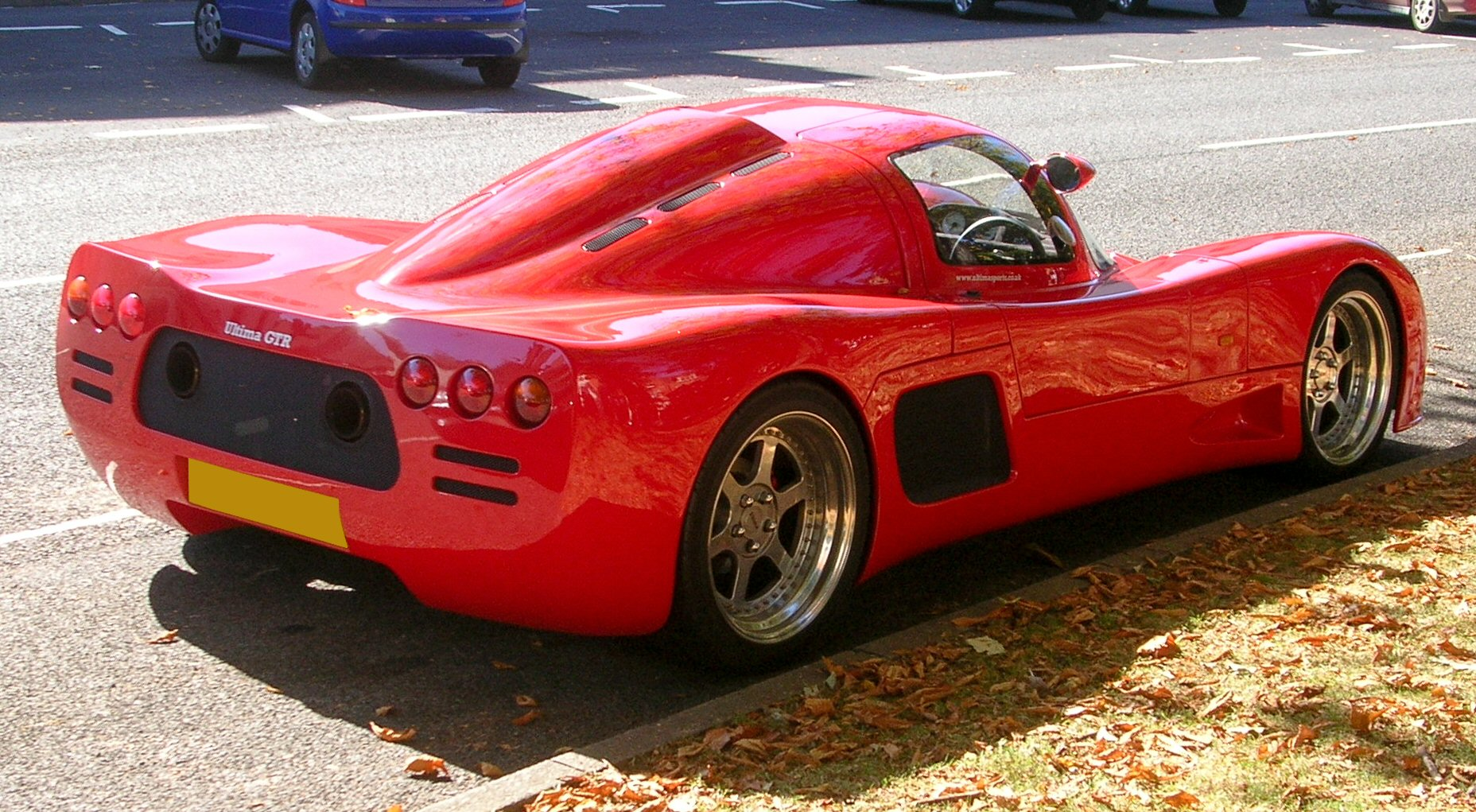
2005 model

Ultima focused their marketing efforts on record-breaking activities using a model equipped with a 640 bhp (649 PS; 477 kW) American Speed engine, called the Ultima GTR640, and subsequently, a 720 bhp (730 PS; 537 kW) at 6700 rpm and a maximum torque of 855 N⋅m (631 lb⋅ft; 87 kg⋅m) at 4400 rpm Chevy V8 engine called the GTR 720. As a result, they established the following official, independently verified records for a production car equipped with road tyres and exhaust:

- Fastest 0–60 mph (97 km/h) time: 2.6 seconds
- Fastest 0–100 mph (161 km/h) time: 5.3 seconds
- Fastest 30 mph (48 km/h)–70 mph (113 km/h) time: 1.8 seconds
- Fastest 100 mph (161 km/h) to 0 mph braking: 3.6 seconds
- Fastest 0 – 100 mph (161 km/h) – 0 mph time: 9.4 seconds
- Best performance on a skidpad: 1.176g lateral grip in a 200 ft (60 m) circle.
- Fastest road car over the 1/4 mile: 9.9 seconds @ 143 mph (230 km/h)

Due to its kerb weight of 980 kg (2,161 lb), the power-to-weight ratio for the GTR720 is 745 bhp (755 PS; 556 kW) per tonne, which is a better ratio than the Bugatti Veyron, Enzo Ferrari, Ascari A10, Koenigsegg CCX or CCGT, but less than the Koenigsegg CCXR or the Caparo T1. However, the Ultima chassis is rated for engines up to 1,000 bhp (1,014 PS; 746 kW) and some of Ultima's customers, notably Jeff Schwartz, have fitted engines producing 1,000 bhp (1,014 PS; 746 kW) or more, for a power-to-weight ratio of over 1,000 bhp (1,014 PS; 746 kW) per tonne, which is approximately twice the power-to-weight ratio of the aforementioned cars and nearly the same as the Caparo T1's (1,170 bhp (1,186 PS; 872 kW) per tonne, but this is a "dry" tonnage and the bhp PS kW/tonne would be reduced once oil, coolant, gasoline, etc. are added, compared to the Ultima figures above which are "wet" weights). There are also other model designations for the kits, including the GTR 660 and GTR 730.

In 2007, the GTR720 was independently timed lapping the Top Gear test track in 1 minute 12.8 seconds, at least one second faster than all other times listed on the Top Gear television programme's Power Board at the time. In October 2009 Ultima set another time of 1 minute 9.9 seconds, but this time in a configuration not suitable for use on public highways. Ultima have been keen to point out that this time is faster than those set by both the Ferrari FXX and the Caparo T1; of which neither were deemed to be acceptable road cars by the Top Gear presenters shortly after these times were set.

In 2011, Romanian workshop Black Falcon Cars mated an Ultima GTR chassis and a modified Porsche GT3 transmission with a Chevrolet V8 turbocharged by Nelson Racing Engines to achieve 1,716 bhp (1,280 kW) on racing fuel and made it fully road legal under the brand name Black Falcon SBC-TT1750.

In 2015 the GTR and Can-Am names were retired and replaced by the Ultima Evolution range, which represents a complete reengineering of the package.

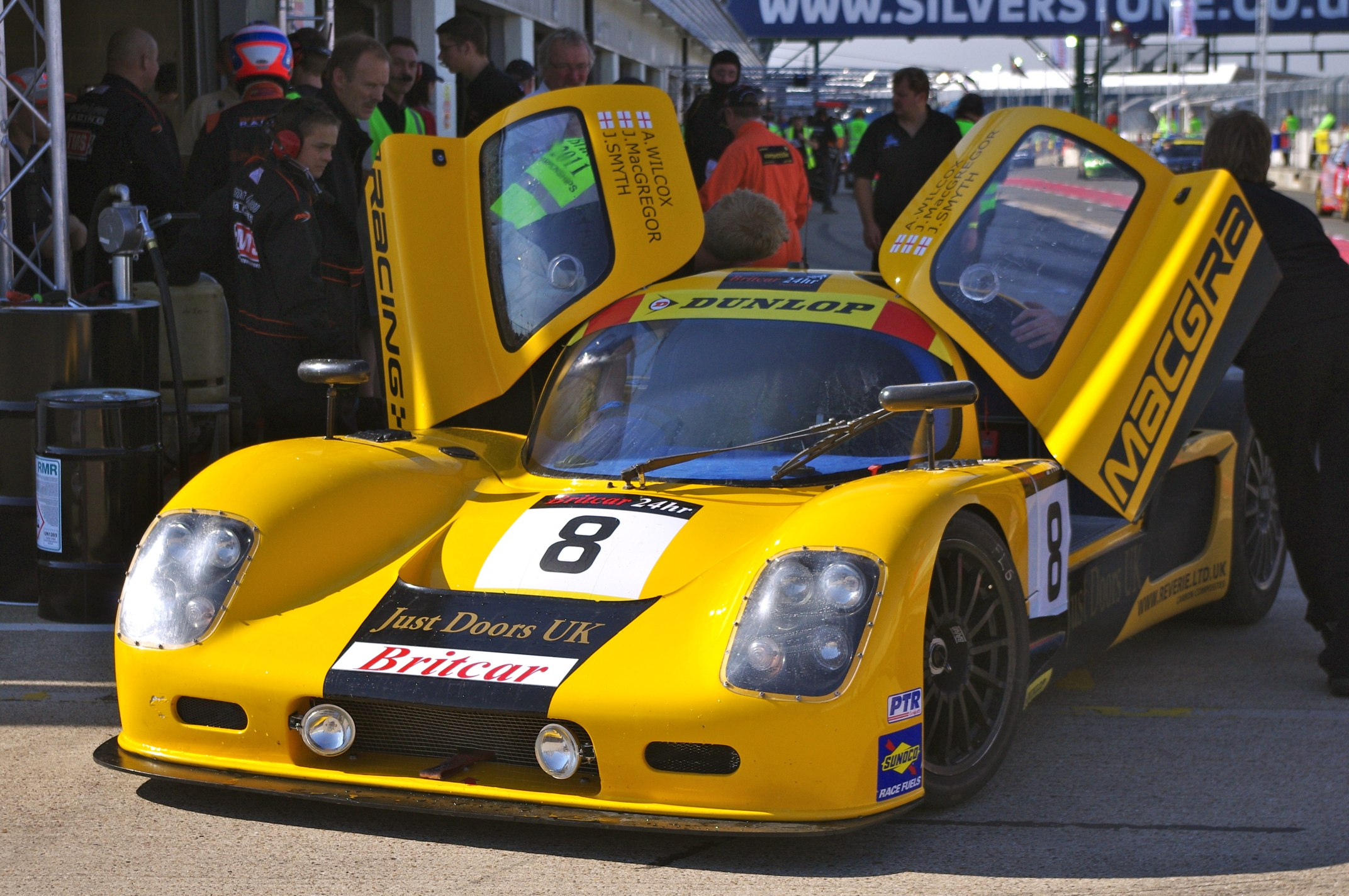
The Ultima GTR GT3

== Trims by Power Output ==
Standard Production Engine Options
Trim Name	Displacement	Engine	Horsepower	Torque	Weight
GTR	5,663 cc (345.6 cu in)	LS1	345 bhp (350 PS; 257 kW) @ 5,600 rpm	475 N⋅m (350 lb⋅ft) @ 4,400 rpm	1,050 kg (2,315 lb)
GTR 500	6,997 cc (427.0 cu in)	LS7	556 bhp (564 PS; 415 kW)	480 N⋅m (354 lb⋅ft)	1,023 kg (2,255 lb)
GTR 535	5,663 cc (345.6 cu in)	LS7	535 bhp (542 PS; 399 kW)	716 N⋅m (528 lb⋅ft)	992 kg (2,187 lb)
GTR 640	6,300 cc (384.4 cu in)	American Speed Tuned Chevrolet V8	640 bhp (649 PS; 477 kW)	786 N⋅m (580 lb⋅ft)	991 kg (2,185 lb)
GTR 720	6,366 cc (388.5 cu in)	American Speed Tuned Chevrolet V8	710 bhp (720 PS; 529 kW) @ 6,700 rpm	580 N⋅m (428 lb⋅ft) @ 4,400 rpm	1,050 kg (2,315 lb)
Optional Engine Rigs
LS3	6,162 cc (376.0 cu in)	LS3	480 bhp (487 PS; 358 kW)	610 N⋅m (450 lb⋅ft)	930 kg (2,050 lb)
LS2 By Schwartz Performance	6,162 cc (376.0 cu in)	LS2 Twin Turbo	1,003 bhp (1,017 PS; 748 kW)	1,114 N⋅m (822 lb⋅ft)	950 kg (2,094 lb)
V10 (Both are called just "V10")	4,999 cc (305.1 cu in)	S85	515 bhp (522 PS; 384 kW)	600 N⋅m (443 lb⋅ft)	950 kg (2,094 lb)
V10 (Both are called just "V10")	4,961 cc (302.7 cu in)	Audi RS 6 V10 Single Turbo	580–600 bhp (588–608 PS; 433–447 kW)	650 N⋅m (479 lb⋅ft)	950 kg (2,094 lb)
Turbo-Barra	3,984 cc (243.1 cu in)	Turbocharged Ford Barra	1,500 bhp (1,521 PS; 1,119 kW)	1,878 N⋅m (1,385 lb⋅ft)	907 kg (2,000 lb)
2JZ	2,997 cc (182.9 cu in)	Turbocharged 2JZ	650 bhp (659 PS; 485 kW)	675 N⋅m (498 lb⋅ft)	1,000 kg (2,205 lb)
1UZ	3,969 cc (242.2 cu in)	1UZ	493 bhp (500 PS; 368 kW)	500 N⋅m (369 lb⋅ft)	885 kg (1,951 lb)
Bentley	6,230 cc (380.2 cu in)	Bentley Arnage sourced Twin Turbo Bentley V8	838 bhp (850 PS; 625 kW)	1,450 N⋅m (1,069 lb⋅ft)	1,025 kg (2,260 lb)
Concept Cars
Ultima GTR powered by Mercury Marine (2009 SEMA Exhibition)	9,351 cc (570.6 cu in)	Mercury Marine V8 Twin Turbo	1,650 bhp (1,673 PS; 1,230 kW) @ 4,000 rpm	2,226 N⋅m (1,642 lb⋅ft) @ 2,750 rpm	980 kg (2,161 lb)
Falcon SBC-TT1750	6,997 cc (427.0 cu in)	Nelson Racing LS7 Twin Turbo	1,716 bhp (1,740 PS; 1,280 kW) @ 5,650 rpm	1,560 N⋅m (1,151 lb⋅ft) @ 5,000	1,221 kg (2,692 lb)
Maxximus G-Force	7,114 cc (434.1 cu in)	LS7 Twin-turbo	1,601 bhp (1,623 PS; 1,194 kW)	2,034 N⋅m (1,500 lb⋅ft)	1,225 kg (2,700 lb)
Maxximus 2000 LNG	7,048 cc (430.1 cu in)	LS7 Twin-turbo (Liquefied natural gas)	1,696 bhp (1,720 PS; 1,265 kW)	2,251 N⋅m (1,660 lb⋅ft)	1,094 kg (2,412 lb)
Race Cars
GTR GTS1 Daytona	5,663 cc (345.6 cu in)	LS1	438 bhp (444 PS; 327 kW)	602 N⋅m (444 lb⋅ft) @ 4,400 rpm	840 kg (1,852 lb)
GTR GT2 (with Balance of performance)	6,791 cc (414.4 cu in)	Modified LS1	520–560 bhp (527–568 PS; 388–418 kW) @ 6,500 rpm	630–746 N⋅m (465–550 lb⋅ft) @ 4,400 rpm	1,000–1,100 kg (2,205–2,425 lb)
GTR GT2 (without Balance of performance)	6,791 cc (414.4 cu in)	Modified LS1	769 bhp (780 PS; 573 kW) @ 7,000 rpm	1,017 N⋅m (750 lb⋅ft) @ 4,500 rpm	810 kg (1,786 lb)
GTR GT3	6,997 cc (427.0 cu in)	LS7	550 bhp (558 PS; 410 kW)	678 N⋅m (500 lb⋅ft)	1,000 kg (2,205 lb)
MacG Taranis GT3(with Balance of performance)	6,997 cc (427.0 cu in)	LS7	550–650 bhp (558–659 PS; 410–485 kW)	746 N⋅m (550 lb⋅ft)	1,085–1,100 kg (2,392–2,425 lb)
MacG Taranis GT3 (without Balance of performance)	6,997 cc (427.0 cu in)	LS7	779–789 bhp (790–800 PS; 581–588 kW) @ 7,500 rpm	1,051–1,085 N⋅m (775–800 lb⋅ft) @ 4,500 rpm	831 kg (1,832 lb)
GTR Hill Climber Special (Stuart Kidgel)	3,500 cc (213.6 cu in)	Heavily modified Alfa Romeo 690T Twin Turbo	718 bhp (728 PS; 535 kW) @ 8,000 rpm	950 N⋅m (701 lb⋅ft) @ 6,500	800 kg (1,764 lb)
