= Lee Noble =

British car designer and engineer

Lee Antony Noble (born January 1958) is a British entrepreneur, car designer and engineer. He is the founder of the sports car companies Noble Automotive Ltd in 1999 and Fenix Automotive in 2009. He is also the designer of some low-volume sports cars, including the Ultima Mk1, Ultima Mk2, Ultima Mk3, Midtec Spyder and Ascari FGT.

Noble's designs have also been further developed beyond his own involvement, resulting in designs such as the Ultima GTR, Ascari Ecosse, Noble M400, Noble M600, Rossion Q1 and designs such as the Salica GT, which was never made. His style for sports cars is to start with a lightweight space frame, have a big powerful engine and an aerodynamic sports-racer body. Almost all the cars Noble has designed have been mid-engined.

In 2012 Noble was involved in the design of the Arrinera Hussarya supercar.

== Automotive companies ==
Noble started Noble Automotive after he finished his involvement with Ascari, a manufacturer of supercars with a high price and small market. He wanted to produce cheaper cars, and Noble Automotive set out to build a relatively affordable, fast car, with the aim of selling hundreds or thousands of cars per year. Noble does much of its basic manufacturing in South Africa. The core body/chassis assemblies are shipped from South Africa to England, where Noble installs the drivetrain, for the European market, and performs final tests.

Noble left Noble Automotive in the spring of 2008 and created a new company Fenix Automotive in late 2009, which was subsequently dissolved in late 2012.

== Cars developed under Noble ==
- (1983) Ultima Mk1
- (1984) Ultima MK 2
- (1986) Ferrari P4 replica
- (1987) Lotus 23 replica
- (1989) Ultima MK 3
- (1989) Prosport LM 3000
- (1991) Midtec Spyder
- (1995) Prosport spyder
- (1996) Ascari FGT
- (1999) Noble M10
- (2000) Noble M12 GTO
- (2002) Noble M12 GTO-3
- (2003) Noble M12 GTO-3R
- (2005) Noble M400
- (2006) Noble M15
- (2009) Noble M600
- (2011) Fenix GT
- (2013) Arrinera Hussarya
