= Ultima Mk1 =

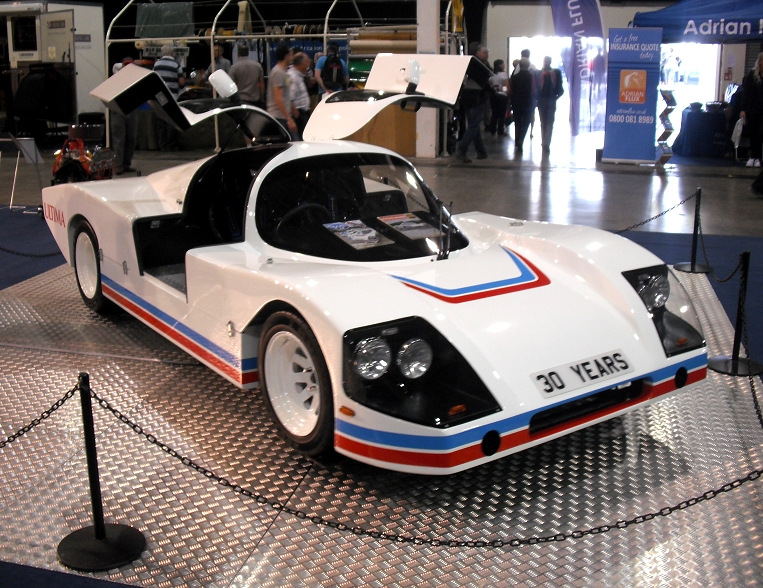

Overview
- Manufacturer: Noble Motorsports Ltd
- Production: 1983; 1 produced
- Assembly: United Kingdom: Hinckley, Leicestershire
- Designer: Lee Noble

Body and chassis
- Body style: 2-door coupe
- Layout: Rear mid-engine, rear-wheel-drive layout
- Doors: Gullwing doors

Powertrain
- Engine: 2,664 cc (162.6 cu in; 2.664 L) PRV V6
- Transmission: 5-speed manual

Dimensions
- Length: 4,267 mm (168.0 in)
- Width: 1,829 mm (72.0 in)
- Height: 1,067 mm (42.0 in)
- Kerb weight: 1,624 lb (737 kg)

Chronology
- Successor: Ultima Mk2

The Ultima Mk1 is a mid-engined concept kit car produced by Noble Motorsport Ltd in 1983 (the company later became Ultima Sports when Ted Marlow and Richard Marlow bought the rights in 1992). The Mk1 was intended to go into production, but before any could be sold, the Ultima Mk2 was introduced. Thus, only one Mk1 was made.

== Required donor parts ==
As the Ultima Mk1 was a kit car, it required a variety of donor parts to complete. The Mk1 uses the 2.7-litre V6 engine and five-speed transaxle from the Renault 30, as well as that car's driveshafts, hubs, wheel bearings, and gear lever. It also uses the steering components, front uprights, front hubs, front brakes and handbrake lever from the Mk3 Ford Cortina, as well as the radiator from the Austin Princess and rear calipers from the Lancia Beta.

== Performance ==
The Mk1 features a square tube space frame chassis and gull-wing doors. The 2664 cc V6 PRV engine from the Renault 30 produces 130 PS (96 kW; 128 hp).
