= Hartge =

German car tuning company

Herbert Hartge GmbH & Co. KG
- Company type: Public
- Industry: Automotive
- Founded: 1971
- Defunct: 2019
- Headquarters: Merzig, Germany
- Key people: Herbert Hartge
- Products: Automobiles

Hartge was a third party car tuning company specializing in BMW, MINI, Juno, and Range Rover cars. Founded in 1971 in Merzig, Germany, the company moved to its current location in Beckingen in 1974. The company is known for putting larger, more powerful factory BMW engines in smaller cars, such as engines from the 5 Series into the smaller 3 Series. In 1985 Hartge was granted manufacturer's status in Germany. All vehicles built from then on received a Hartge Motorsport VIN plate in place on the BMW VIN plate. The company was liquidated in mid-2019 and deleted from the commercial register.

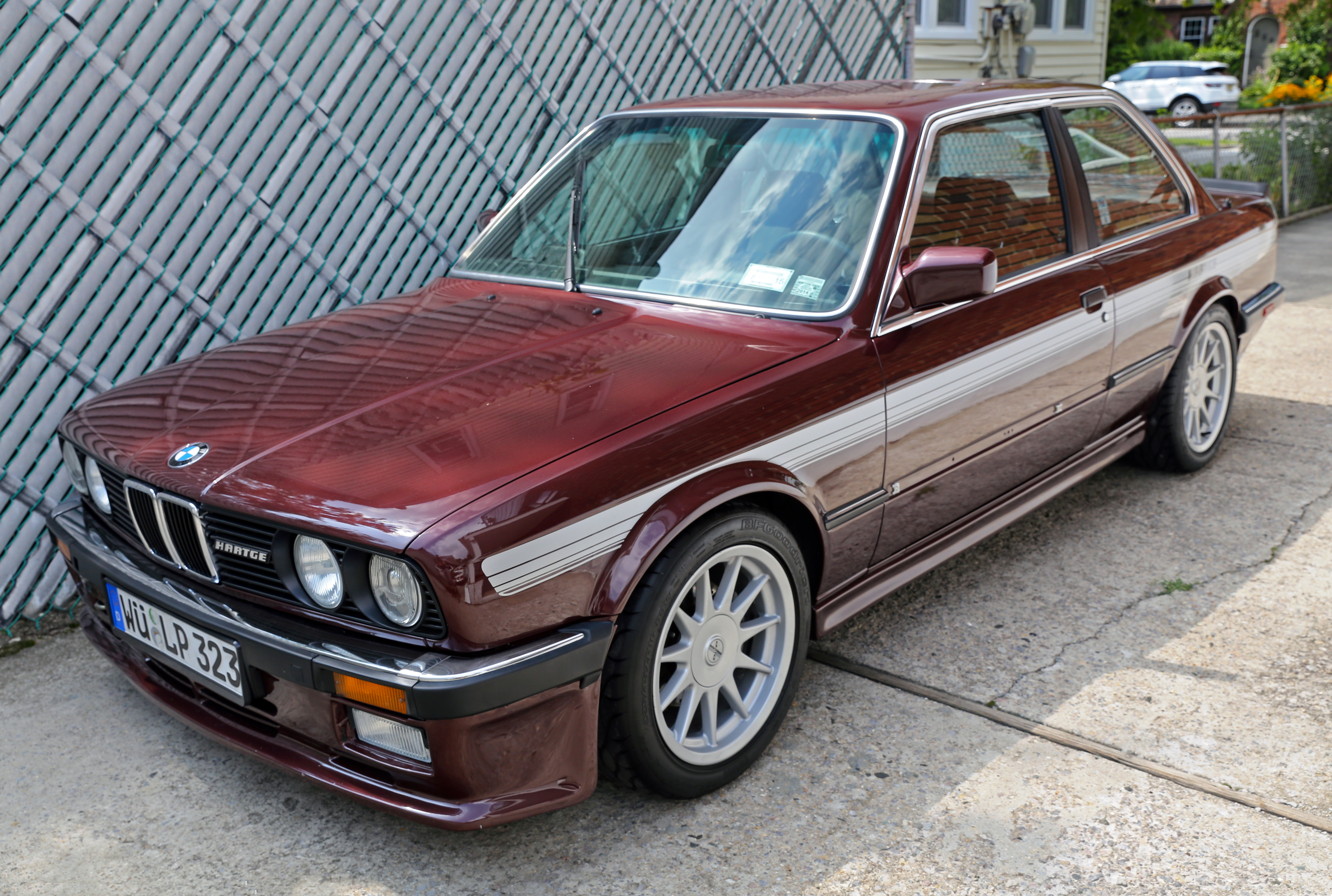
1983 Hartge H23 (BMW 3 Series (E30))

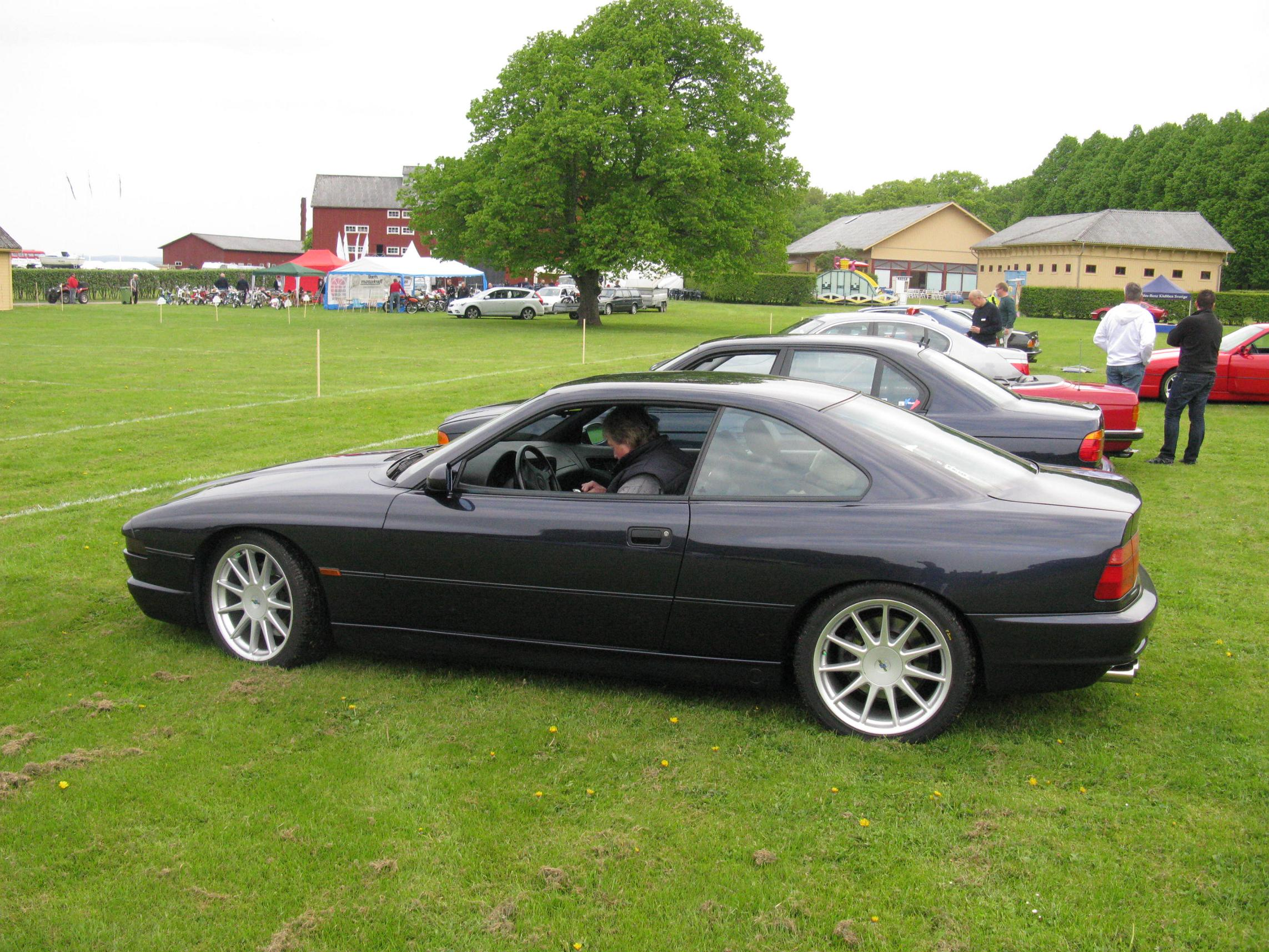
Hartge H8 (BMW 850CSi)

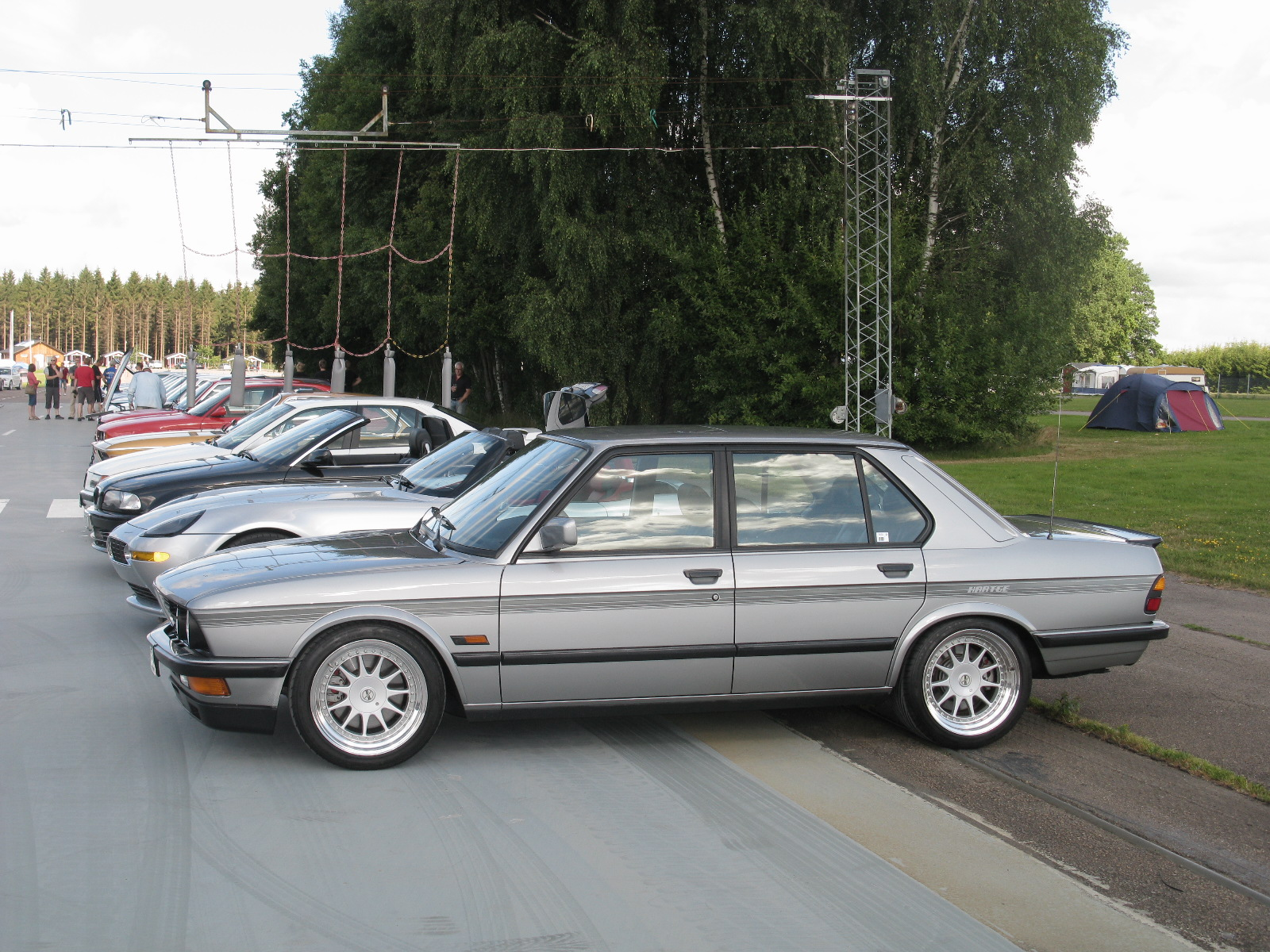
Hartge BMW 535i (E28)

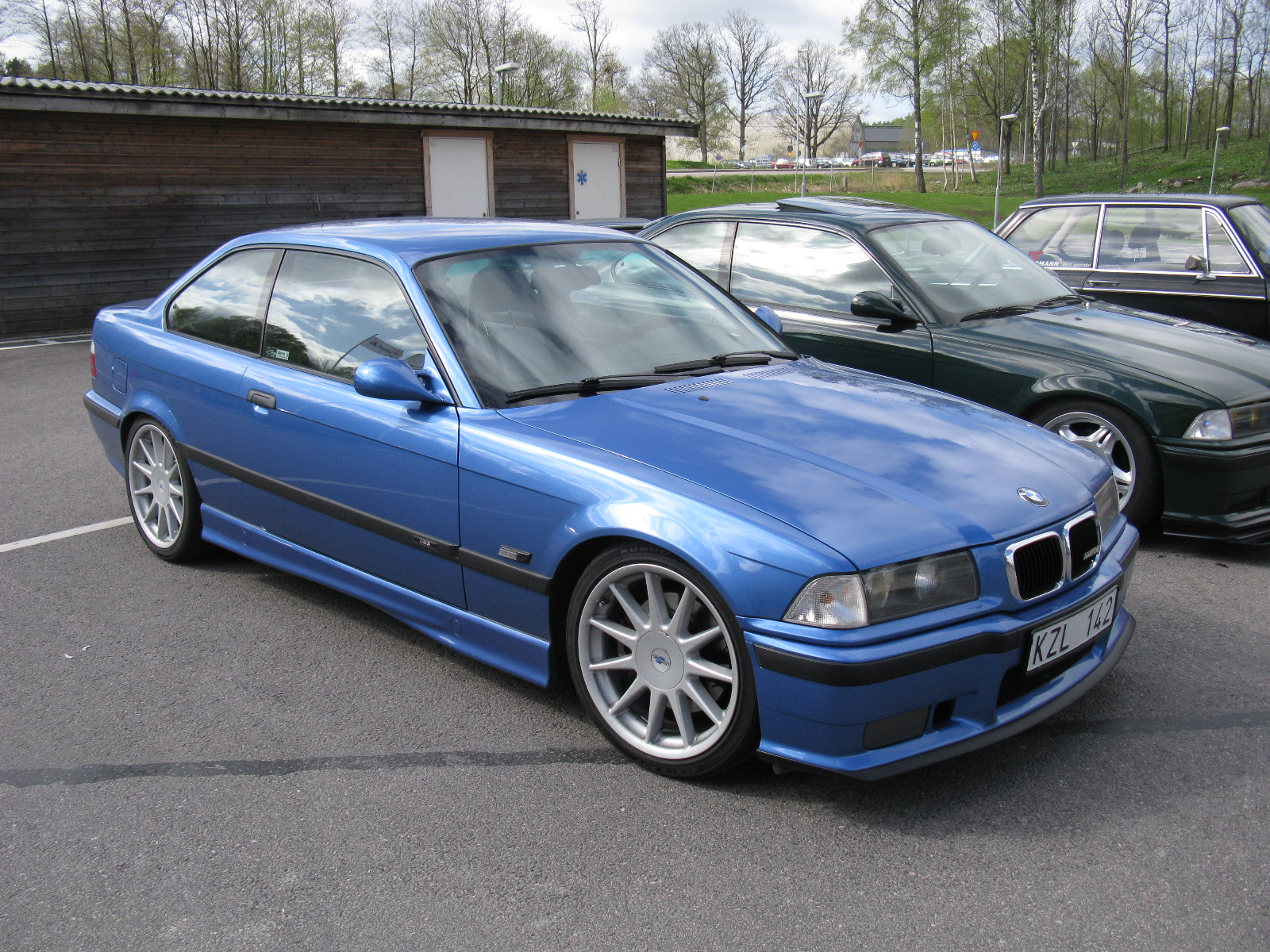
Hartge BMW M3 E36 3.5
