= In-car Internet =

Internet service provided in a car

In-car Internet refers to Internet service provided in a car. Internet access can be provided by tethering a mobile phone, with a mobile hotspot, or with any satellite-based connections, whether portable or built into the car. Built-in systems have existed since 2008 and include:

- General Motors OnStar: provides subscription-based telecommunication, in-vehicle security, hands free calling, navigation, and remote diagnostics.
- BMW Assist telematic roadside assistance service.
- Mercedes-Benz mbrace, which connects a car from a smartphone or computer.
- Cadillac CUE, a built-in mobile hotspot combined with a data subscription.
- Chrysler Uconnect Web: has a Wi-Fi hotspot with a 150-foot range via a 3G EV-DO cellular network from Autonet Mobile It includes Bluetooth for cell phones, a hard drive, SiriusXM TV and satellite and GPS. It is a fee-based service that includes a free trial with a new car.
- Toyota Safety Connect: a subscription-based telematics system introduced in 2009 providing telecommunication, roadside assistance, car safety, remote diagnostics, and other services. It is offered, including the aforementioned features as part of the Toyota Entune package, while Lexus models receive the Lexus Enform system with Safety Connect, adding hands free calling and destination assistance services. Vehicles equipped with Safety Connect come with a one-year subscription included at purchase, which can then be renewed annually.

Exposing a vehicle to cellular connectivity can lead to security vulnerabilities where a hacker accesses the vehicle's control systems.
