= Safety Connect =

Toyota subscription-based telematics system

External videos
- CNET overview of Lexus Enform with Safety Connect

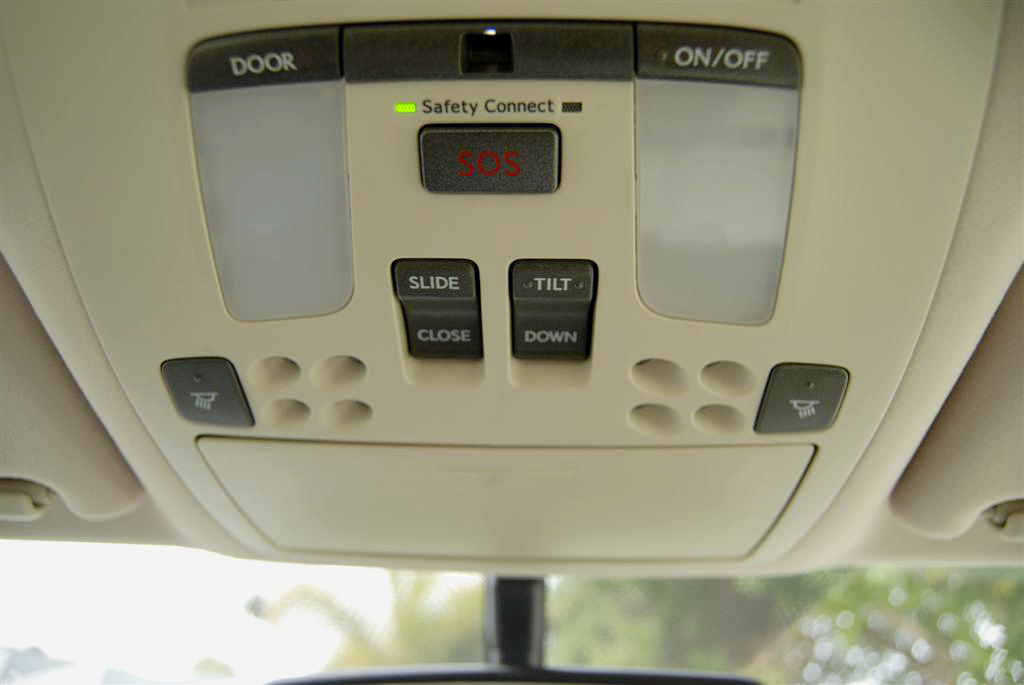
Overhead module of Lexus IS 250 with Safety Connect emergency assistance (SOS) button

Safety Connect is a subscription-based telematics system introduced by Toyota Motor Corporation in 2009 for its Toyota-branded and Lexus models. The system provides communications, roadside assistance, car safety, remote diagnostics, and other services. Unlike the earlier Lexus Link service offered on Lexus models, the Safety Connect system is proprietary and not licensed from GM's OnStar service. Safety Connect began to be offered on vehicles in the middle of 2009. For Toyota vehicles, the Safety Connect service is offered including the aforementioned features as part of the Toyota Entune telematics package, while Lexus models receive the Lexus Enform telematics system with Safety Connect, adding hands free calling, and destination assistance services.

In the U.S., vehicles equipped with Safety Connect come with a one-year subscription included at purchase, which can then be renewed annually. All Lexus vehicles sold in the U.S. which are model year 2018 or newer (with the exception of the 2018 GX 460) come with a 10-year complimentary subscription included at purchase. Following its offering in the U.S., the telematics service will also be available in Brazil and China.

== Technology ==
Safety Connect includes four primary functions:

- Advanced Automatic Collision Notification
- Emergency Assistance Button (SOS)
- Stolen Vehicle Tracking
- Roadside Assistance

These functions utilize Safety Connect's embedded GPS and cellular signaling technology. The automatic collision notification will signal for help if airbag deployment or a collision is detected. Alternatively, the SOS button can be used to contact rescue services. A 24-hour call center with law enforcement linkage also can track the location of a stolen vehicle via the Safety Connect GPS signal. For Lexus Enform with Safety Connect, additional functions added include Destination Assist, eDestination, Flexible Voice Interface, and others. The Enform system allows drivers to pre-select destinations at home and send routes wirelessly from their computer to the vehicle.

The Safety Connect system is based on Toyota's Japanese domestic market subscription-based G-Book service, which provides emergency assistance, information, wireless, cell phone, and PC linkages, while the Lexus Enform system is derived from G-Link, a telematics service with Lexus call center support, song library, remote access, and other features.

== Vehicles ==
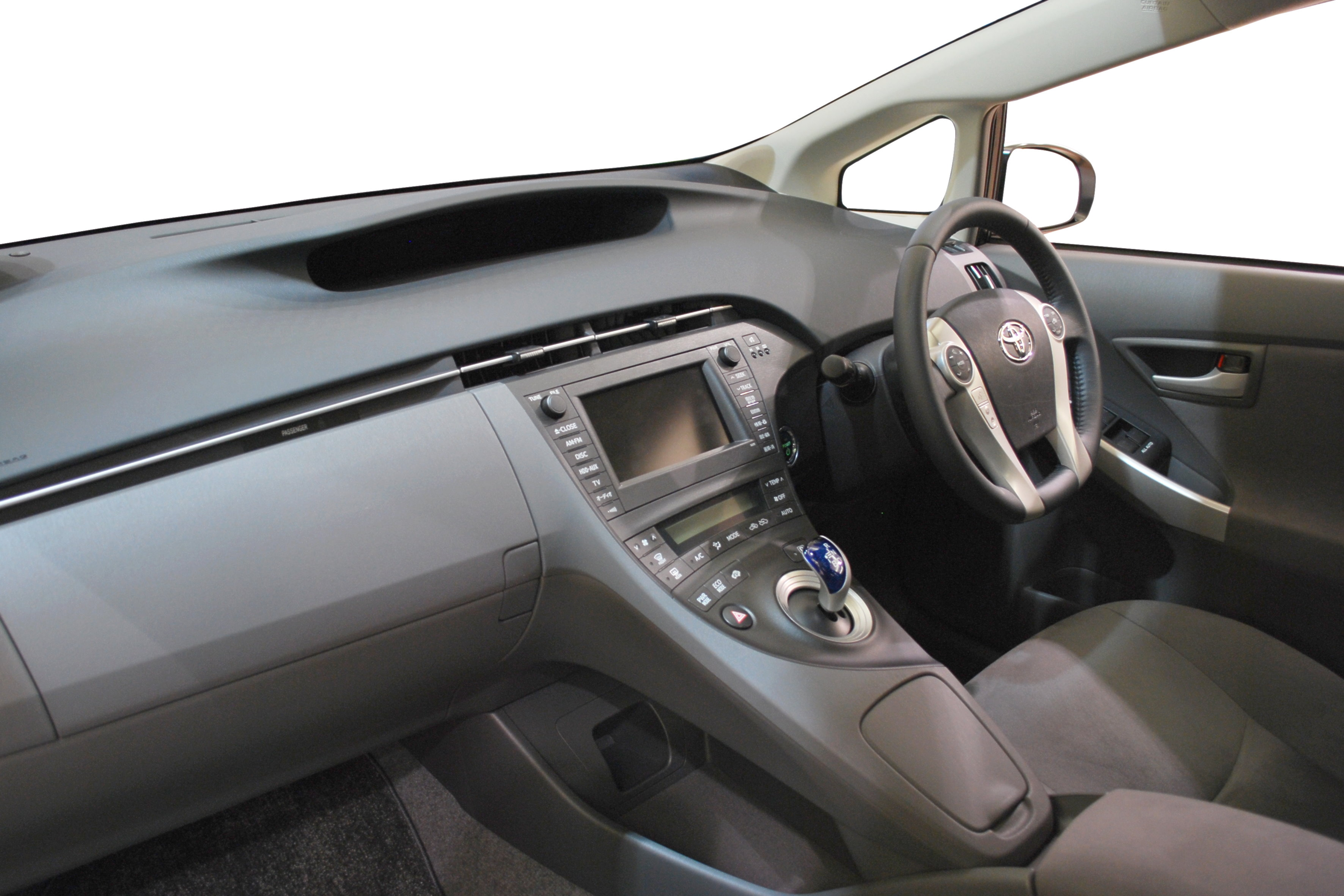
Interior of 3rd generation Prius, with Safety Connect links in overhead console.

Models that have adopted the Safety Connect system to date, listed by model year:

- 2010 Toyota Prius
- 2010 Toyota 4Runner
- 2010 Toyota Land Cruiser
- 2011 Toyota Prius
- 2011 Toyota Sienna
- 2012 Toyota Prius Plug-in
- 2012 Toyota Prius v
- 2012 Toyota RAV4 EV
- 2012 Toyota Camry
- 2013 Toyota Avalon
- 2014 Toyota Highlander

Selected models began offering the service in August 2009. Models that have adopted Lexus Enform with Safety Connect:

- 2010 Lexus HS 250h
- 2010 Lexus RX 350
- 2010 Lexus RX 450h
- 2010 Lexus IS 250/350
- 2010 Lexus IS 250/350 C
- 2010 Lexus ES 350
- 2010 Lexus GS 350/460/450h
- 2010 Lexus LS 460/460 L
- 2010 Lexus LS 600h L
- 2010 Lexus LX 570
- 2010 Lexus GX 460

== See also ==
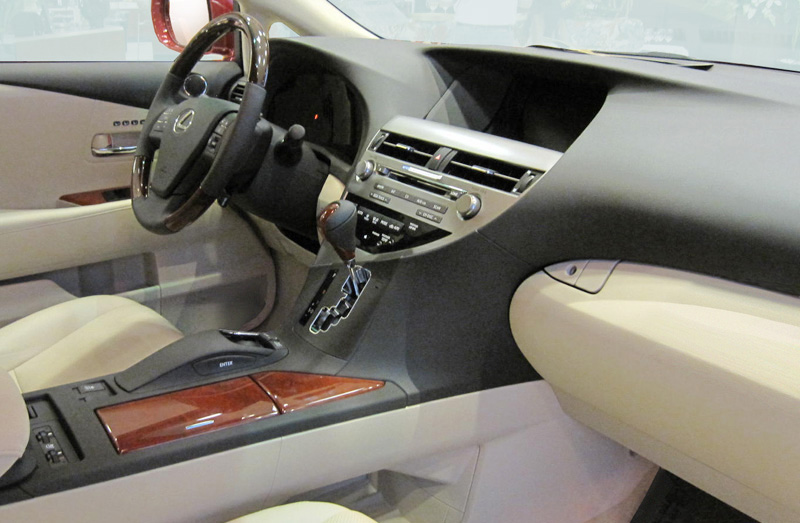
Interior of Lexus RX, fitted with Lexus Enform with Safety Connect

- Advanced Automatic Collision Notification
- BMW Assist
- GPS tracking
- Lexus Link
- LoJack
- MVEDR
- MyFord Touch
- OnStar
- Toyota G-Book
- Toyota Entune
