= Lexus Link =

Toyota subscription-based telematics system

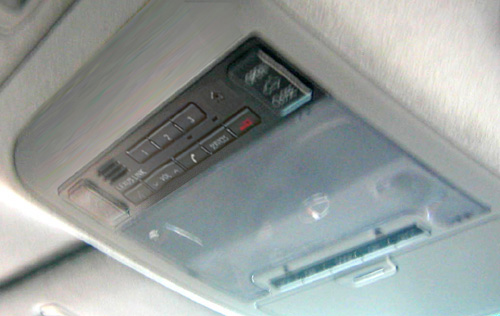
Lexus Link module

Lexus Link, launched in October 2000, is a subscription-based safety and security service from Lexus. It has been offered as a factory-installed option, available on certain Lexus models (LX, GX, LS, and GS), offering call-center-based telematics services to owners with equipped vehicles in the United States and Canada. The second-generation Lexus Link system utilizes a dedicated cellular phone (dual-mode CDMA/analog), Global Positioning Satellite (GPS) technology and 24-hour live-operator support. In 2009, an expanded system with added functionality, Lexus Enform with Safety Connect, succeeded Lexus Link.

== History ==
The first generation Lexus Link system was a private-labeled brand of OnStar, operating on Verizon Wireless’ cellular network, available as a factory-installed option on the following vehicles in Model Years 2001-04: LS 430 ('01-'04), GX 470 ('03-'04), LX 470 ('03-'04), SC 430 ('03-'04) and RX 330 ('04). The first generation system was analog-only and is no longer operational.

The second generation Lexus Link system was launched October 2005 as a private-label brand of OEM Telematics Services, available as a factory-installed option on MY 2006 and later LX, GX (vehicles produced October 1, 2005 and later) and MY 2007 and later LX, GX, LS, GS vehicles and uses dual-mode (digital/analog) technology operating on Verizon Wireless’ cellular network.

The differences between the first and second generation systems are as follows:

Item	2nd Generation Lexus Link	1st Generation Lexus Link
System Diagram	Bus buffer not listed	Bus buffer listed
Cellular Network Infrastructure	Digital (CDMA) / Analog	Analog only
Voice Recognition	Available (English Only)	Not available
Voice Prompt Language Selection	English, some Spanish	English
Automatic Theft Notification	Not available	Available
Remote Horn and Lights	Available	Not available
Memo Record	Not available	Available
Advisor Record	Available	Not available
Personal Calling	Available	Not available
Advanced Services	Available	Not available
Backup Battery	Non-rechargeable Type	Rechargeable Type
Diagnosis/Status	LED Only	LED and Voice Prompt

== Services ==
Lexus Link is offered in the continental U.S. and Alaska. Different service packages are offered to customers. While safety and security are the main purpose of the Lexus Link system, further services include driving directions, information assistance, traffic, weather, stock quotes, or Personal Calling. Depending on service package, potential services include:

Service Name	Service Description
Airbag Deployment Notification	In the event of an airbag deployment, an automatic call is made to Lexus Link call center for assistance.
Stolen Vehicle Location	If a vehicle is reported stolen, Lexus Link Advisor can work with law enforcement to determine its location.
Emergency Services Notification	Priority call to Lexus Link call center for assistance.
Roadside Assistance	Lexus Link Advisor will provide vehicle location to Lexus Roadside Assistance.
Remote Door Lock/Unlock	By calling Lexus Link's toll-free number, an Advisor can lock/unlock the vehicle's doors.
Remote Horn and Lights	By calling Lexus Link's toll-free number, an Advisor can flash the lights and sound the vehicle's horn.
Accident Assist	An Advisor can walk driver through a checklist after an accident.
Driving Directions	Lexus Link call center can verbally provide driving directions.
Information / Convenience Services	A Lexus Link Advisor can locate and contact businesses from a national database.
Ride Assist	Lexus Link can arrange alternative transportation on subscriber's behalf.

== Analog sunset ==
Due to the growth and acceptance of digital cellular systems, many cellular carriers have abandoned analog coverage in favor of digital service. The Federal Communications Commission (FCC) ruled that cellular telephone companies operating in the United States are no longer required to provide analog service after February 2008. As a result, beginning January 1, 2008, Lexus Link service in the U.S. and Canada was only made available to vehicles equipped with dual-mode (analog/digital) equipment.

Since the first-generation Lexus Link system uses analog cellular technology and cannot be modified to digital operation, Lexus offered to disable the Lexus Link system and remove the button panel from the vehicle at no cost for owners of model year 2001–2004 vehicles.

== See also ==
- Advanced Automatic Collision Notification
- BMW Assist
- Dashtop mobile
- GPS tracking
- LoJack
- MVEDR
- OnStar
- G-Book
