= AACN =

AACN may refer to:

- Advanced Automatic Collision Notification
- American Association of Colleges of Nursing
- American Association of Critical-Care Nurses
