= Toyota Entune =

Multimedia system for Toyota automobiles

Toyota Entune Logo

Toyota Entune was an integrated multimedia navigation and telematics system for Toyota automobiles that provides satellite-based information on traffic, weather, sports scores, stocks, and fuel prices via subscription through SiriusXM. When connected to a compatible mobile phone running the Entune app via radio or USB cable, the system provides a browser and other apps, including music services such as iHeartRadio, Pandora and XM Satellite Radio. The cell phone app supported iOS, Android, and Blackberry with different versions utilizing cell data. The system could be controlled with (limited) speech recognition, and optionally include the “Safety Connect” personalization system.

== Overview ==
Entune was based on Toyota G-Book service and first released in 2011 on the Toyota Prius v and was available in subsequent years. The Lexus Enform application suite expanded on the technology used by Entune.

The Entune platform would begin to be phased out in 2021, in favor of Toyota's newer infotainment suite, Toyota Audio Multimedia. In 2023, support for Entune phone app was discontinued, and Entune features were integrated into the Toyota phone app. The services provided in the app for Entune would be fully discontinued by Toyota on October 30, 2023.

== Evolution of Entune Hardware ==
Iterations of Entune are distinguished via the generation of the head unit. Beginning with 11CY, the evolution of head unit functionality parallels hardware capabilities.

Model	2012MY	2013MY	2014MY	2014.5MY	2015MY	2016MY	2017MY	2018MY	2019MY
4Runner	11CY	11CY	13CY	-	13CY	13.5CY	13.5CY	13.5CY	13.5CY
Avalon	-	11CY	11CY	-	13CY	13.5CY	13.5CY	13.5CY	
Camry	11CY	11CY	11CY (8/2013-11/2013)	13CY (12/2013+)	13CY	13.5CY	13.5CY	17CY	17 CY
C-HR	-	-	-	-	-	-	-	-	17CY
Corolla	11CY	11CY	13CY	-	13CY	13.5CY	13.5CY	13.5CY	17CY
Corolla Hatchback	-	-	-	-	-	-	-	-	17CY
Highlander	-	11CY	13CY	-	13CY	13.5CY	13.5CY	13.5CY	13.5CY
Landcruiser	-	11CY	11CY	-	11CY	15CY	15CY	15CY	15 CY EMVN
Mirai	-	-	-	-	-	13.5CY	13.5CY	17CY	17CY
Prius	11CY	11CY	11CY	-	13.5CY	13.5CY	13.5CY	13.5CY / 16CY	13.5 CY / 16 CY
Prius C	11CY	11CY	11CY	-	13CY	13.5CY	13.5CY	13.5CY	13.5 CY
Prius V	11CY	11CY	11CY	-	13CY	13.5CY	13.5CY	13.5CY	-
Prius Prime	-	-	-	-	-	-	16CY	16CY	16 CY
RAV4	11CY	11CY	13CY	-	13CY	13.5CY	13.5CY	13.5CY	17 CY
Sequoia	-	13CY	13CY	-	13CY	13.5CY	13.5CY	13.5CY	13.5 CY
Sienna	11CY	11CY	11CY	-	13CY	13CY	13CY	17CY	17 CY
Tacoma	11CY	11CY	13CY	-	13CY	13.5CY	13C.5Y	13.5CY	13.5 CY
Tundra	-	11CY	13CY	-	13CY	13CY	13C.5Y	13.5CY	13.5 CY
Yaris HB	-	-	-	-	-	-	-	-	13.5 CY
Venza	-	11CY	11CY	-	13CY	13CY	-	-	-

== Entune Version - 3.0 ==
Launched in 2017 in the 2018 Toyota Camry, Entune 3.0 is the current iteration of Toyota Motor North America's telematics and infotainment platform. Entune 3.0 is a departure from previous Entune platforms, as it is based on the Automotive Grade Linux operating system as opposed to Blackberry QNX in previous versions. As such, it is not compatible with Entune 2.0 mobile applications and integrations. However, this operating platform upgrade potentially enables many more third-party developer enhancements by moving to an open-source platform as opposed to the proprietary QNX system used in previous versions.

Entune 3.0 relies on an interface and app suite that is installed during vehicle assembly. Software and firmware updates can be made to the head units via a USB flash drive, and some versions of the head units can also be updated over the air (OTA). In April 2019, Toyota announced that some backward compatibility would be possible for the 2018 Sienna and Camry vehicles. The press release was noted as saying "The software enhancement is being provided at no cost" and would be made available via a software download to a USB flash drive from Toyota Information Services (TIS). The published release date for this software is May 6, 2019.

== Head unit trim levels ==
The head units in the 2018 Camry are available in three levels.

- Entune 3.0 Audio - Includes Touchscreen display, AM/FM Radio, Siri Eyes Free, Scout GPS Link with Moving Maps, Entune 3.0 App Suite, and Voice Recognition controls
- Entune 3.0 Audio Plus - Touchscreen display, Siri Eyes Free, Scout GPS Link with Moving Maps, Entune 3.0 App Suite, CD Player, AM/FM/HD (replaces AM/FM Radio), SiriusXM, Scout GPS Link with Moving Maps, Safety Connect, Service Connect, Remote Connect, Wi-Fi Connect, Available "JBL® with Clari-Fi™"
- Entune 3.0 Premium Audio - Touchscreen display, Siri Eyes Free, Scout GPS Link with Moving Maps, Entune 3.0 App Suite, CD Player, AM/FM/HD (replaces AM/FM Radio), SiriusXM, Dynamic Navigation, Dynamic POI Search, Destination Assist Connect, Safety Connect, Service Connect, Remote Connect, Dynamic Voice recognition controls, Wi-Fi Connect, Available "JBL® with Clari-Fi™"

=== Head Unit Visual Identification ===
	Entune 3.0 Audio	Entune 3.0 Audio Plus	Entune 3.0 Premium Audio
Identifiable Characteristics	No CD Player	CD Player, No MAP Button	CD Player and MAP button
Alternate Name	DA-Base; T0	DA-Deluxe; T1	AVN (EMVN); T2
Head Unit Manf.	Pioneer	Panasonic	Panasonic
Amplifier Location	Head Unit	Head Unit (Separate for JBL audio)	Head Unit (Separate for JBL audio)
Equipped with a DCM?	No	Yes	Yes
Equipped with a MCU (Navigation ECU)?	No	No	Yes
Navigation Type	Scout GPS Link app	Scout GPS Link app	Dynamic
Voice Recognition	Static	Static	Dynamic
HDRadio	No	Yes	
Sirius XM Radio	No	Yes	
Siri Eyes Free / Google Now (Voice Controls)	Yes		
AM/FM Radio	Yes		
Bluetooth Audio	Yes		
Bluetooth Hands Free	Yes		
Phonebook - Import Contacts	Yes		

== Entune Version - 3.0 Connected Services ==
Depending on the vehicle, subscription-based connected services for vehicles equipped with Audio Plus or Premium Audio head units may include:

- Service Connect
- Safety Connect
- Remote Connect
- Wifi Connect
- Destination Assist
- Dynamic Navigation

In the 4th quarter of 2018, Toyota USA published a Telematics Services Status portal where people can confirm the performance of various USA-based connected services. Available status includes:

- Safety Connect
- Destination Assist
- Service Connect
- Remote Services
- Scout GPS Link
- Entune / Enform App Suite
- Entune 3.0 / Enform 2.0 App Suite
- Alexa Skill (Remote)
- Toyota+Alexa / Lexus+Alexa
- Lexus Drivers
- Toyota Owners
- Registration (Customer)
- Registration (Dealer)

== Service Connect ==
Multiple vehicle status reports may be sent to the customer.

=== Vehicle health report ===
Contains vehicle data such as mileage, smart key battery status, engine oil quantity, fuel level, service history, recent changes to Toyota Personalized Settings, and more.

=== Maintenance alerts ===
A maintenance alert alerts vehicle owners to an array of statuses. If maintenance alerts are enabled, they may also be distributed to servicing dealers to support service.

== Safety Connect ==
=== Automatic collision notification ===
In the event that the vehicle's airbags deploy or the vehicle is involved in a severe rear-end collision, a transmission will be made to the 24-hour Safety Connect response center. After attempting to speak to the occupants, the agent will notify local emergency services of the situation and direct them to the vehicle's location based on the GPS signal provided by the vehicle's embedded system.

=== Emergency assistance button (SOS) ===
Pressing the emergency assistance button (SOS) connects to a 24-hour Safety Connect response center. Using the vehicle's GPS technology, the agent can send emergency services to your vehicle's location while offering to stay on the line with you until help arrives.

=== Roadside assistance ===
Roadside assistance may be activated by pressing the Emergency Assistance button (SOS). Safety connect utilizes the GPS embedded in the vehicle to support roadside assistance efforts. Services may include support if the vehicle runs out of gas, a flat tire, a tow, or a jump start.

=== Stolen vehicle locator ===
The Safety Connect response Center can work with police once a police report is filed to help track and recover your stolen vehicle using Safety Connect's embedded cellular and GPS technology. The Stolen Vehicle Location system works across the continental U.S.A.

== Remote Connect ==
=== Vehicle finder ===
The Vehicle Finder supports vehicle location outside or in an uncovered parking lot to locate your vehicle's last known parked location.

=== Engine start/stop ===
Remote engine starts/stop lets you remotely start your vehicle to warm or cool the interior based on the last climate-control settings. The engine or hybrid system will run for up to 10 minutes or until any door is opened, the brakes are pressed, or the engine is turned off remotely.

=== Remote door lock/unlock ===
Enables an owner the ability to remotely lock and unlock the vehicle's doors and receive confirmation if the action was successful. If the doors are unlocked remotely, the doors will automatically re-lock after 30 seconds if no further action takes place.

== Wifi Connect ==
=== WiFi hotspot ===
Utilizes the AT&T network to support up to 5 devices with 4G LTE data transfer.

== Destination Assist ==
=== Destination assist connect ===
Provides 24-hour, en-route navigation assistance with the ability to receive directions and destinations from an operator. The agent can help the caller find a business, address, point of interest, or restaurant within a specified proximity. Additionally, the agent can input the new navigation instructions, including via points, directly into the head unit.

== Dynamic Navigation ==
=== Dynamic maps & route ===
Dynamic Navigation checks embedded map data against the cloud to download and store map updates. This navigation service uses the onboard and the off-board data to give navigation directions to the customer. It supports the ability to update maps and guidance based on changing road and traffic conditions.

=== Dynamic POI ===
Search an expanded database for points of interest with casual search terms, as if you were using an internet search box.

== Entune 3.0 App Suite ==
Entune 3.0 App Suite Connect offers access to mobile applications using the vehicle display by touch or voice command. Applications included at the time of launch are:

- Pandora Radio Effective November 13, 2018, Pandora®, OpenTable, and Facebook Places are no longer available in Entune™ App Suite.
- Slacker Radio
- Amazon Alexa
- NPR One
- LiveXLive
- iHeartRadio
- Yelp
- Scout GPS Link with moving maps - Moving maps requires USB tethering. iOS users are required to run the application in the foreground to enable moving maps.

In addition to HD Radio, the digital signal supports the transmission of ancillary data:

- Fuel onboard
- Traffic off-board
- Sports
- Weather (Powered by The Weather Channel)
- Stocks

== Hardware/Software Version Couples (US Vehicles) ==
Firmware versions are available for download via the Toyota Information System, which requires a subscription to access. Additionally, some limited versions of firmware are available to the consumer via the owner's portal.

Entune Hardware Version	Latest Entune Software Version
2015 NON JBL Premium	5.2

== Availability ==
For US vehicles (model years):

- 2012–2024 4Runner
- 2013–2022 Avalon
- 2013–2022 Avalon Hybrid
- 2012–2024 Camry
- 2012–2024 Camry Hybrid
- 2012–2022 Corolla
- 2013–2022 Highlander
- 2013–2021 Land Cruiser
- 2016–2022 Mirai
- 2012–2022 Prius, Prius Plug-in Hybrid
- 2012-2019 Prius c
- 2012-2017 Prius v
- 2012–2022 RAV4, RAV4 Hybrid
- 2012–2022 Sequoia
- 2012–2024 Sienna
- 2012–2023 Tacoma
- 2012–2021 Tundra
- 2013–2022 Venza

== See also ==
- G-Book (Toyota Japan)
- iDrive
- Microsoft Auto
- Ford Sync
- MyFord Touch
- Hyundai Blue Link
- Kia UVO
- UConnect Web
- Bluetooth
- Voice Recognition
- Infotainment
- Global Positioning System Device
- Safety Connect (Toyota)
