= Dashtop mobile =

Wireless electronic devices attached to a vehicle dashboard

Dashtop mobile equipment refers to wireless mobile devices mounted on the vehicle dashboard. Dashtop mobile equipment (DME) includes satellite radios, GPS navigation, OnStar, mobile TV, HD radio, vehicle tracking system, MVEDR and Broadband Wireless Access (BWA) devices. Currently, the dashtop mobile devices are mostly satellite-based wireless technology. With the exception of OnStar and BWA devices, most of them are in the stage of passive one-way communications equipment.

Evolving mobile technology is changing dashtop mobile equipment into full-duplex multimedia gadgetry due to the influence of fast-growing broadband infrastructure, including expanding WiMAX networks worldwide. These developments show a shift towards integrated electronic vehicle gadgetry, with growing indications of convergence to an all-in-one dashtop mobile device.

== History ==
Since the commercial debut of cellular phones in the early 1990s, Palm Inc took the lead in developing a generation of palmtop handheld personal computers that worked like an electronic personal organizer. Palmtops turned into Personal Digital Assistants (PDAs) with mobile phone functions.

As of 2007, PDA phones are preferred by some, due mainly to wider screens and easier texting plus mobile multimedia functions, such as audio video playback, mobile web and mobile TV. Apple's iPhone made a debut in late June 2007, featuring keypadless touchscreens with multi-touch.

== Mobile issues ==
Mobile technology is evolving fast, and in the 2007 NEXTcomm opening keynote in Chicago, Ed Zander, then CEO of Motorola, noted "Today it's about fast, affordable broadband Internet. Tomorrow I believe it's about wireless and broadband media platforms. And we as an industry have to work together, software and platforms, the content players and the carriers, as well as the equipment suppliers like ourselves, to bring this vision of this broadband media platform to a reality."

At the same NXTcomm conference, Verizon Chairman and CEO Ivan Seidenberg also proclaimed, "We have barely begun to imagine all the ways that rich graphics, two-way broadband and virtual reality will transform medicine, education and creative industries. This surge in visual, interactive content – delivered to any screen, anytime, anywhere – has changed our industry forever."

The recall of lithium-ion battery for laptops in 2006, and the emerging safety issue concerning portable handheld devices, like iPOD.

== Market developments ==
Dashtop mobile equipment market will be led by GPS navigators for a while, but there will come a turning point when GPS navigation leans more toward tracking and will marry GPS data and mobile web to generate location-based services (LBS). In support of this view, location-based services are a "cornerstone" of Nokia's Internet strategy, Chief Executive Officer Olli-Pekka Kallasvuo said on October 1, 2007. "Handset makers led by Nokia Oyj will sell 48 percent more GPS-equipped phones this year than last, according to researcher iSuppli. Consumers also will find navigation systems available in more new cars, giving them little reason to pay $250 or more for units from Garmin or TomTom, said consultant Blair Swedeen," said Bloomberg News on November 15, 2007. Carmakers are also buying navigation displays from parts companies such as Denso Corp. and building them into the dashboard at the factory. More than 7 percent of new cars and light trucks sold in 2006 had built-in GPS, up from about 6 percent in 2005, according to Ward's Automotive Yearbook. Mobile-phone makers are working with carmakers to turn cell phones into the focal point for providing functions such as navigation and music in the car, said Canalys's Jones. "By 2015, the handset will be the natural server, the one device that's got everything," said Jones. "Portable navigation devices are a dangerous place to be if that's all you're doing." Nokia, Samsung Electronics, Motorola. and other handset makers will sell 162 million GPS phones in 2007, dwarfing the 20 million GPS units Garmin and TomTom have forecast they will sell combined, according to iSuppli, a leading market researcher in California. It shows a spatial shift of GPS navigation to mobile handsets, and the next spatial shift points to the dashtop centers due to the widespread legal bans of mobile handsets while driving.

== Harnessing vehicle traffic ==
- Freedom from battery life concerns due to a possible shift to car battery
- Driving safety associated with driver focus and driver distraction
- Transition from voice-intensive cellular technology to media-intensive broadband technology
- Open access plans adopted for the Federal Communications Commission's 700 MHz Airwave Auctions held for early 2008 in USA and the subsequent openness of the controversial C Block to be realized by Verizon Wireless, the successful bidder

=== Academic research ===
Scientific research and market-based R&D endeavors are focused on harnessing vehicle traffic and wireless connections. MIT embarked on Real Time Rome, a project that is designed to create real-time maps of people moving around a city through mobile phone networks with the aim of beating traffic congestion. "Real Time Rome might also help with the better allocation of transport resources."

UCLA researchers are working on a project to encourage installation of vehicle-to-vehicle mobile computer networks to ensure driving safety and deal with congestions.

== Challenges for automakers ==
Automakers challenges include:

- how to improve fuel efficiency in keeping with green technology
- how to enhance driving safety, mainly based on electronic gadgets
- how to adapt to fast-evolving mobile broadband technology to stay ahead of competition.

Topping the list of dashtop gadgetry issues are MP3 players, video streaming and playback, mega-bit-per-second downloads of multimedia, mobile TV formats, dashtop interfaces either for mobile phones or smartphones, choices of 4G technologies between LTE, UMB and mobile WiMAX.

== Scope of applications ==
=== Vehicular mobility to lure more BWA equipment and applications ===
Scope of applications, either on lab benches or in implementation stages, can be summarized as below:

- Just In Time (JIT) eCommerce on the go
- mobile banking
- mobile advertising
- mobile marketing
- location-based services (LBS)
- mobile ticketing & remote check-in processes for transport hubs, ballparks and expos (Compare with "cellphone use as paperless boarding pass")
- mass surveillance at transportation hubs, targeted at both passengers and motorists
- distance mobile payment of parking fees, tolls, bills ( in terms of range and real-time sync, it differs from proximity-based mobile payments, such as contactless payment, Near Field Communication (NFC), smartcards, RFID tags, and online payments like PayPal and Google Checkout )
- mobile entertainment, including paid downloading of music, movies, video games and playback functions. Microsoft is showcasing such features in its Windows Mobile for Automotive.
- Mobile vehicle-to-vehicle driving safety monitoring

== See also ==
- Automotive design
