= Toyota Prius V =

Full hybrid petrol-electric compact MPV

Toyota Prius v
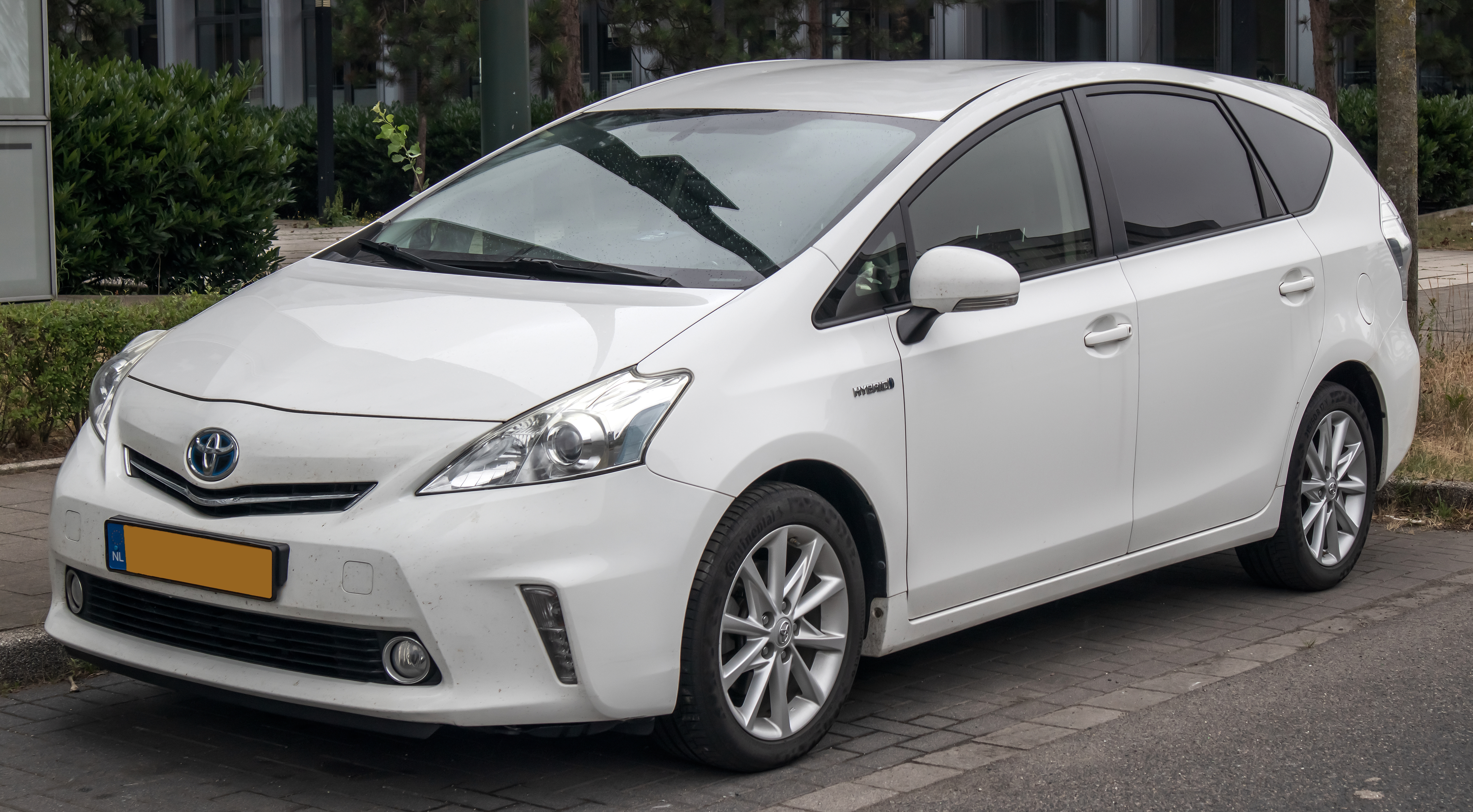

Overview
- Manufacturer: Toyota
- Model code: XW40
- Also called: Toyota Prius α (Japan); Toyota Prius+ (Europe and Singapore); Toyota Grand Prius+ (Benelux); Daihatsu Mebius (Japan, 2013–2021)
- Production: May 2011 – March 2021
- Model years: 2012–2017 (US); 2012–2018 (Canada)
- Assembly: Japan: Toyota, Aichi (Takaoka plant)
- Designer: Kousuke Kubo; Mineo Imaiida; Masanori Kinoshita (2009)

Body and chassis
- Class: Compact MPV
- Body style: 5-door wagon
- Layout: Front-engine, front-wheel-drive
- Platform: Toyota New MC platform
- Related: Toyota Prius (XW30)

Powertrain
- Engine: Toyota Hybrid System; Petrol engine: 1.8 L 2ZR-FXE I4 Dual VVT-i (Atkinson cycle); Power: 98 hp (73 kW) at 5200 rpm; Torque: 105 lb⋅ft (142 N⋅m) at 4000 rpm; Hybrid system total: 134 hp (100 kW)
- Transmission: 1-speed planetary gear
- Battery: 1.3 kWh Nickel–metal hydride (five seater); 1.0 kWh lithium-ion battery (7-seat)

Dimensions
- Wheelbase: 2,780 mm (109.4 in)
- Length: 4,615 mm (181.7 in)
- Width: 1,775 mm (69.9 in)
- Height: 1,575–1,600 mm (62.0–63.0 in)
- Curb weight: 1,450–1,470 kg (3,196.7–3,240.8 lb)

The Toyota Prius v (for versatile), also named Prius α (pronounced as Alpha) in Japan, and Prius+ in Europe and Singapore, is a hybrid petrol-electric automobile produced by Toyota introduced in Japan in May 2011, in the U.S. in October 2011, and released in Europe in June 2012. The Prius v was unveiled at the January 2011 North American International Auto Show alongside the Prius c Concept, and it is the first Prius variant to be spun off from the Prius platform. According to Toyota the "v" stands for "versatility". It is a compact MPV with a standard full hybrid drivetrain.

The Prius α was offered in the Japanese market with both nickel–metal hydride battery and lithium-ion battery. The Prius v in the U.S. was offered only with a nickel–metal hydride battery. As of April 2016, global sales totaled about 634,000 units, led by Japan with 428,400 units sold, representing 67.6% of global sales.

== Specifications ==
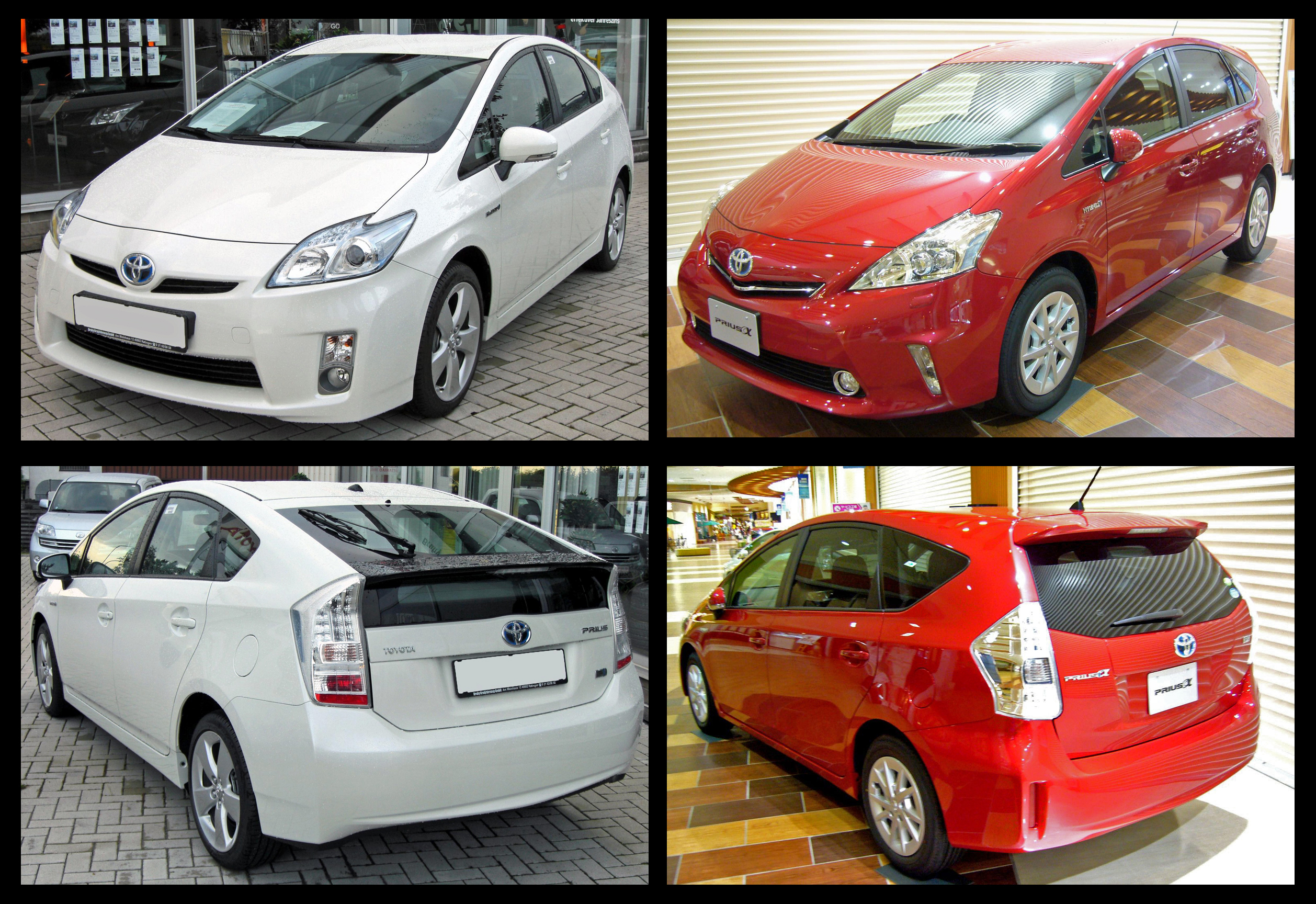
Comparison with 2010 Prius

The Prius v design resembles compact based minivans prevalent in Europe and has a drag coefficient of Cd=0.29 with a shape that evolved from the Prius. The exterior styling is rounded with an extended roofline that allows the vehicle to retain the triangular silhouette symbolic of Prius. Other differences are the trapezoidal-shaped front with sharp-edged headlamps and wind-slipping aero corners for improved aerodynamics, as well as an enlarged under grille. The rear styling has a specially designed roof spoiler that improves air flow.

The interior cargo space is more than 50% larger than the 2010 Toyota Prius, 5 inches (130 mm) longer and 1 inch (25 mm) wider, providing 34.3 cubic feet (970 L) of cargo space behind the rear seats; it also offers 38 inches (970 mm) of rear leg room, and more head height.

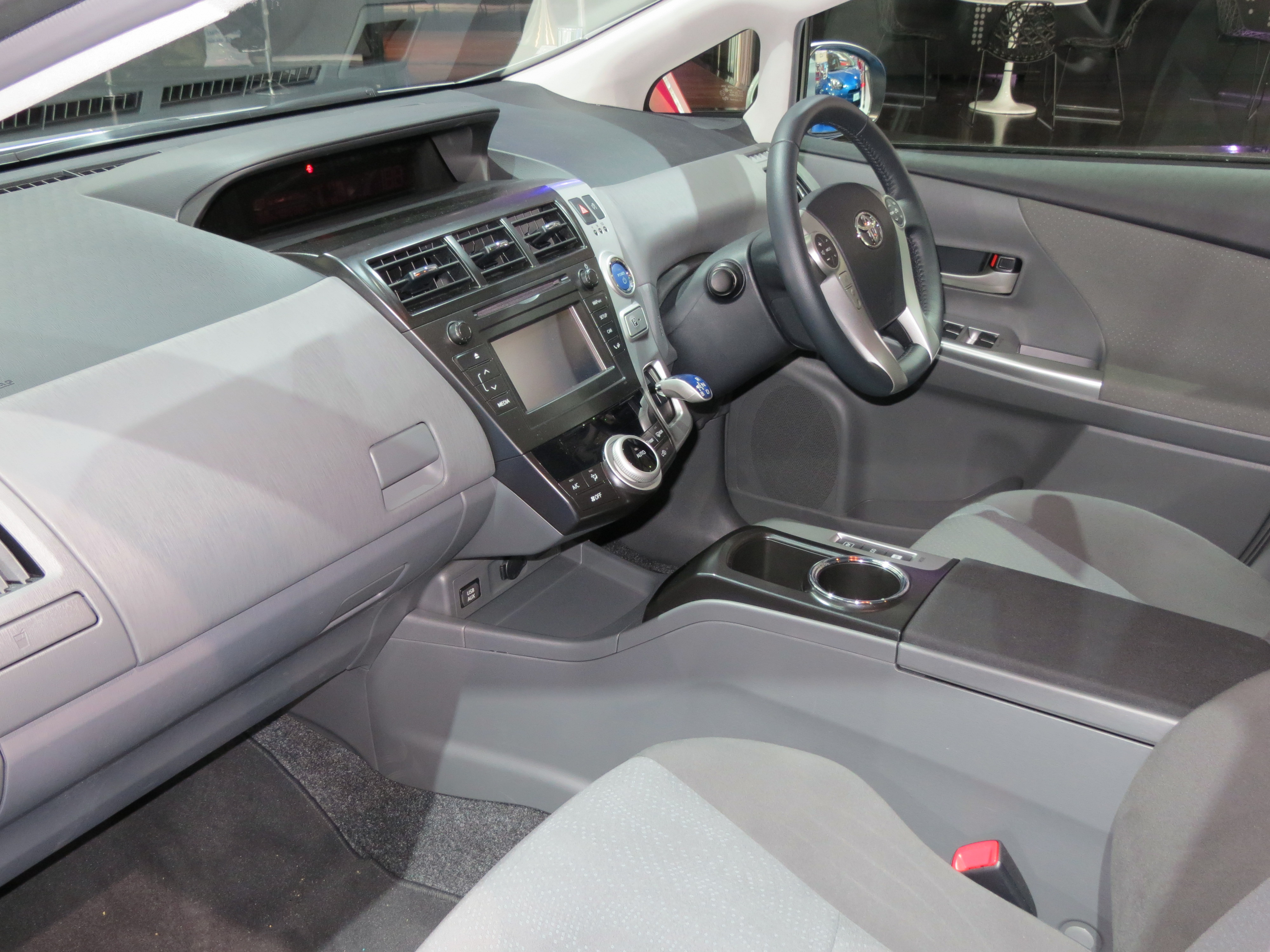
Interior

The Toyota Prius v includes many of the same standard features of the 2010 Prius, with four driving modes: Normal, Power, Eco and EV; smart key with push button start, an electronic shift lever, Hill Start Assist Control (HAC), and a back-up camera. Available options include energy-efficient LED headlamps, dynamic radar cruise control with a Pre-Collision System (PCS), and advanced parking guidance system. The Prius v has several technical advancements including Toyota's new Toyota Entune Multimedia System and a panoramic sunroof made of lightweight resin, 40% lighter than a glass roof of the same size. Entune premiered on the 2012 Toyota Prius v.

=== Powertrain ===
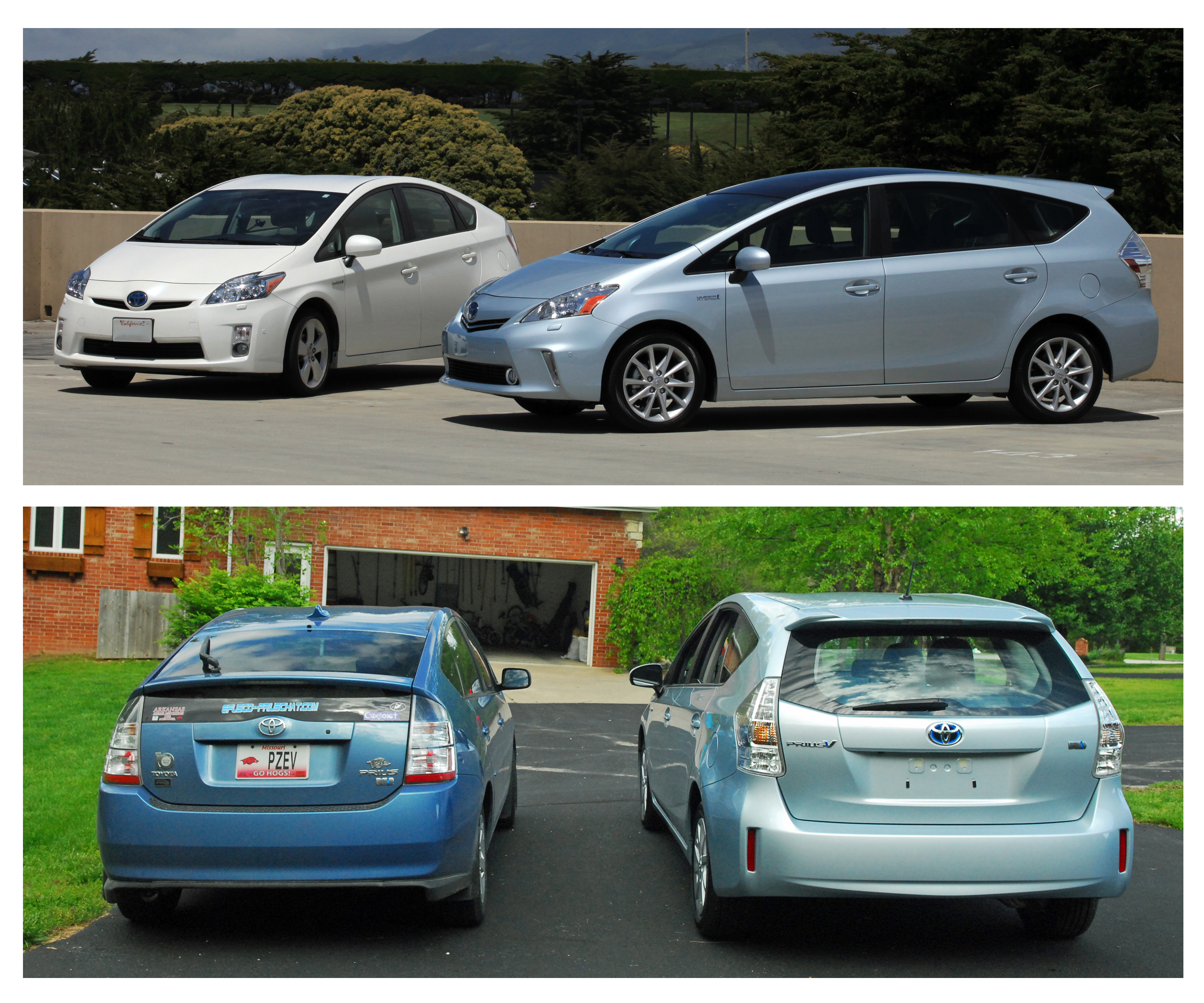
Side by side comparison of Toyota Prius Liftback (left) and Prius v (right)

The Prius v powertrain uses the same 1.8-litre Atkinson cycle petrol inline-four engine used in the conventional Prius, a 60 kW traction motor, and shares the Prius's Hybrid Synergy Drive system and the same 201 volt nickel-metal hydride battery pack.

Toyota introduced some refinements unique to the Prius v powertrain. These refinements include a new "Pitch and Bounce" motor control that the Prius v automatically employs on undulating roads and the refined control was designed to improve ride comfort and control. Because the Prius v is a larger vehicle with greater load capacity, suspension components were redesigned to improve handling and ride quality. "Pitch and Bounce" control works with the vehicle's suspension to cancel longitudinal oscillation when the Prius v is driven over uneven surfaces.

The Prius v also includes a redesigned engine coolant heating structure surrounding the vehicle's catalytic converter and the exhaust heat recirculation system has been refined to reduce engine warm-up time and improve occupant heater response time in cold weather. A switch valve electronically controls coolant recirculation through the exhaust heat recirculation system.

=== Safety ===
In the United States the 2012 model year Prius v includes Toyota's Vehicle Proximity Notification System (VPNS), which is designed to alert pedestrians, the blind, and others of the vehicle's presence due to significant noise reduction typical of a hybrid vehicle traveling at low speeds in EV mode. This type of warning device is mandated in the United States by the Pedestrian Safety Enhancement Act of 2010. The warning sound is generated by externally mounted speakers and it activates automatically only at speeds below about 15 mph (24 km/h). The pitch varies with the vehicle's speed to give pedestrians a sense of whether the approaching Prius is accelerating or decelerating. Reception for this feature of the car had been mixed, with the website Green Car Reports thinking it sounded like a "Deranged Spaceship".

ANCAP test results Toyota Prius V (2015)
Test	Score
Overall	5 /5 stars
Frontal offset	15.21/16
Side impact	15.27/16
Pole	2/2
Seat belt reminders	3/3
Whiplash protection	Good
Pedestrian protection	Good
Electronic stability control	Standard

== Fuel economy and emissions ==
The United States Environmental Protection Agency (EPA) rated the Prius v fuel economy at 44 miles per US gallon (5.3 L/100 km; 53 mpg_{‑imp}) for city driving and 40 miles per US gallon (5.9 L/100 km; 48 mpg_{‑imp}) for highway, and a combined rating of 42 miles per US gallon (5.6 L/100 km; 50 mpg_{‑imp}). According to Toyota, the Prius v produces 66% less smog-forming emissions than the average new vehicle.

Under the New European Driving Cycle (NEDC) test, the base model has a fuel consumption of 4.1 L/100 km (69 mpg_{‑imp}; 57 mpg_{‑US}) in combined cycle and 3.8 L/100 km (74 mpg_{‑imp}; 62 mpg_{‑US}) in city driving. Its CO_{2} emissions are estimated at 96 g/km. The top-of-the-line model has a fuel consumption of 4.4 L/100 km (64 mpg_{‑imp}; 53 mpg_{‑US}) and CO_{2} emissions of 101 g/km.

== Markets ==
Toyota launched the second member of the Prius family with three regional versions of the vehicle: the Prius v in the North American market, the Prius α in Japan, and the Prius+ in Europe and Singapore. The Alpha is the basis for the five-seat launched in North America, and the seven-seat released in Europe. A total of 186,989 Prius α/v/+ were sold worldwide in 2012, its first full year in the market. Global sales up to April 2016 totaled 634,000 units. Japan is the main market with 428,400 units sold, representing 67.6% of global sales. The United States ranks second with 148,079 units (23.4%), followed by Europe with 38,200 (6.0%), Canada with 12,670 (2.0%), and the rest of the world with 6,600 (1.0%).

The following table presents retail sales since deliveries of the Prius α began in May 2011 for the top selling national markets by year through April 2016.

Toyota Prius v/α/+ sales by top national markets between 2011 and April 2016
Country	Total	2016 CYTD^{(1)}	2015	2014	2013	2012	2011
Japan	428,400	10,000	52,115	76,515	104,012	129,848	55,201
United States	148,079	4,970	28,290	30,762	34,989	40,669	8,399
European Union	38,200	2,000	7,474	6,549	10,737	10,987	0
Canada	12,670	611	2,497	2,292	2,640	4,077	553
Rest of the world	6,600	590	1,537	1,529	1,454	1,408	43
Global sales	634,000	19,200	91,913	117,647	153,832	186,989	64,299
Notes: (1) CYTD: Sales through April 2016.

=== Japan ===
On 13 May 2011, Toyota introduced the Prius α (pronounced as Prius Alpha) in Japan with a sales target of 3,000 units per month. The Prius Alpha was available in a five-seat, two-row model and a seven-seat, three-row model, the latter's third row enabled by a space-saving lithium-ion drive battery in the center console. The five-seat model uses a NiMH battery pack. Deliveries of the Alpha were delayed due to the effects of the 2011 earthquake and tsunami on production. Toyota announced it had received 25,000 orders for the Prius α hybrid wagon and minivan models in Japan before the start of sales. Since its introduction, a total of 111,500 Prius α have been sold in Japan through April 2012, representing 80.8% of the Prius α/v model line's global sales. Since May 2011 a total of 289,000 Prius α have been sold through December 2013.

Initially, the Prius α was offered in 2 grades: S, G. In Japan, the Prius α was available in all dealerships (Toyota Store, Toyota Corolla Store, and Netz Store). In October 2012, the "S," "S Touring Selection," and "G Touring Selection" models had the three-row seat option added.

On 8 April 2013, Daihatsu started selling its OEM version of the Prius α for the Japanese market under the Daihatsu Mebius (Japanese: ダイハツ・メビウス, Hepburn: Daihatsu Mebiusu) name. The Mebius was discontinued in February 2021.

In 2014, the S Touring Selection G's was introduced.

In November 2017, the GR Sport variant was added, replaced the G's variant.

On 1 December 2020, Toyota announced that the Prius α would be discontinued from March 2021.

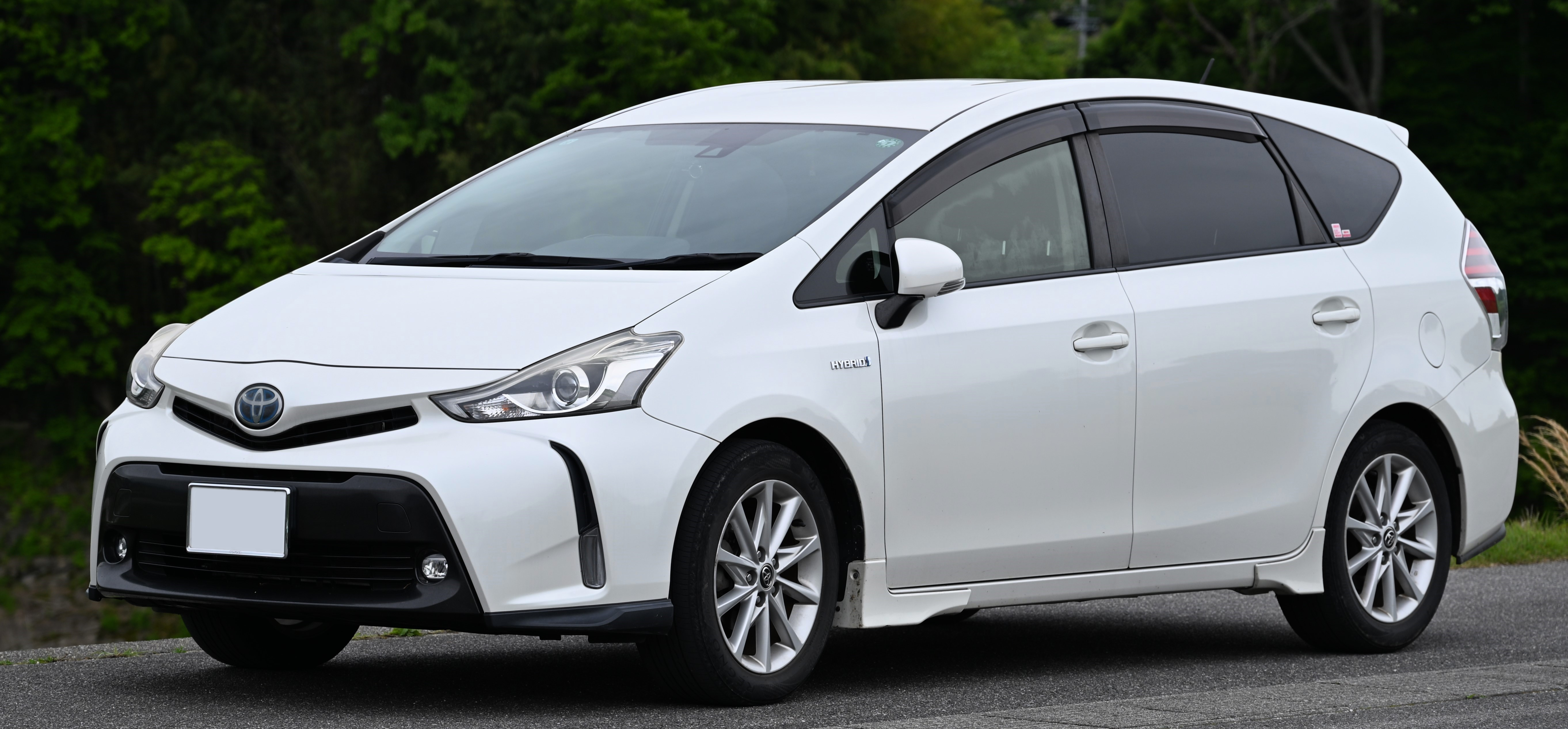
Toyota Prius α Touring Selection (facelift)

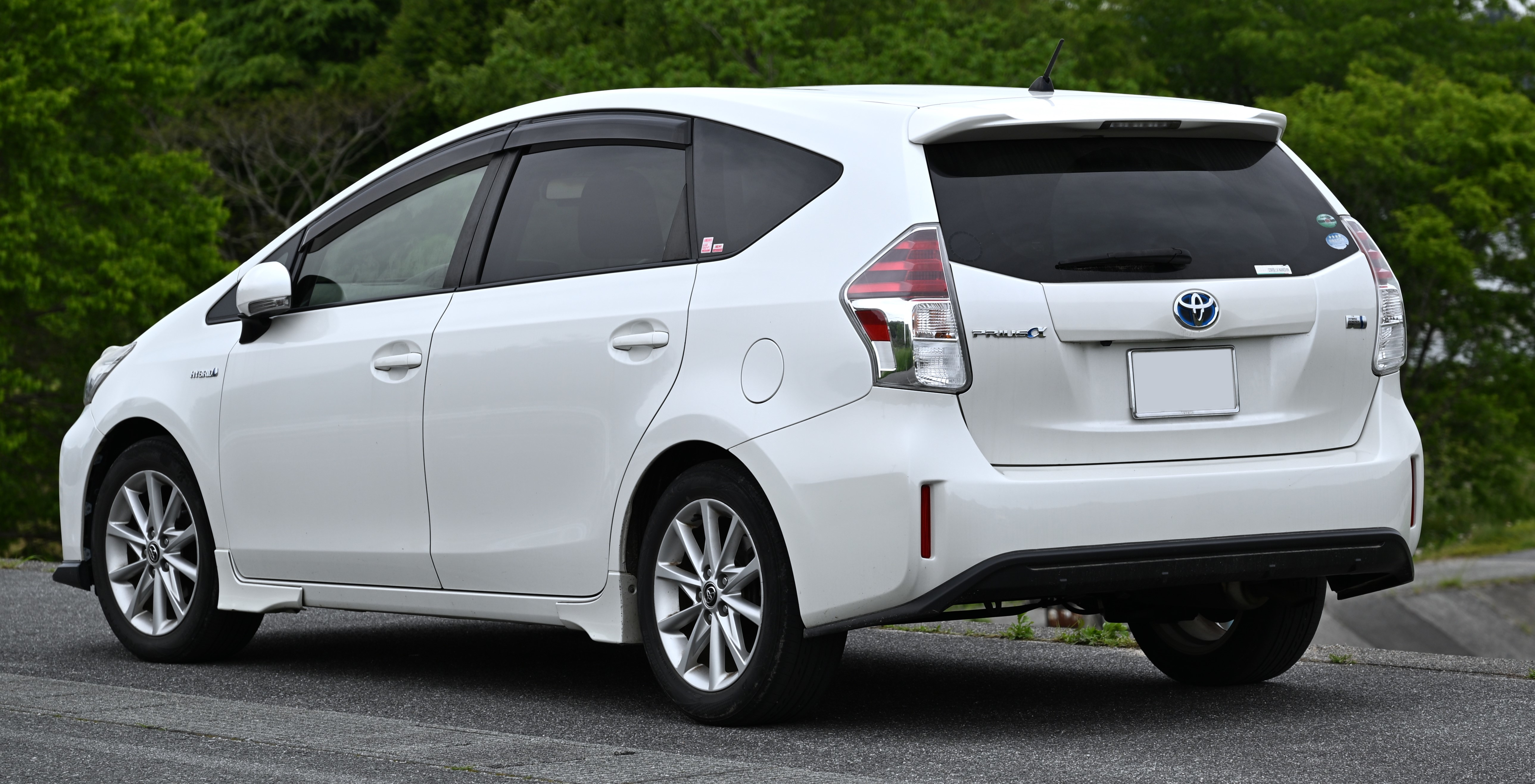
Toyota Prius α Touring Selection (facelift)

Prius α S" L selection (pre-facelift)

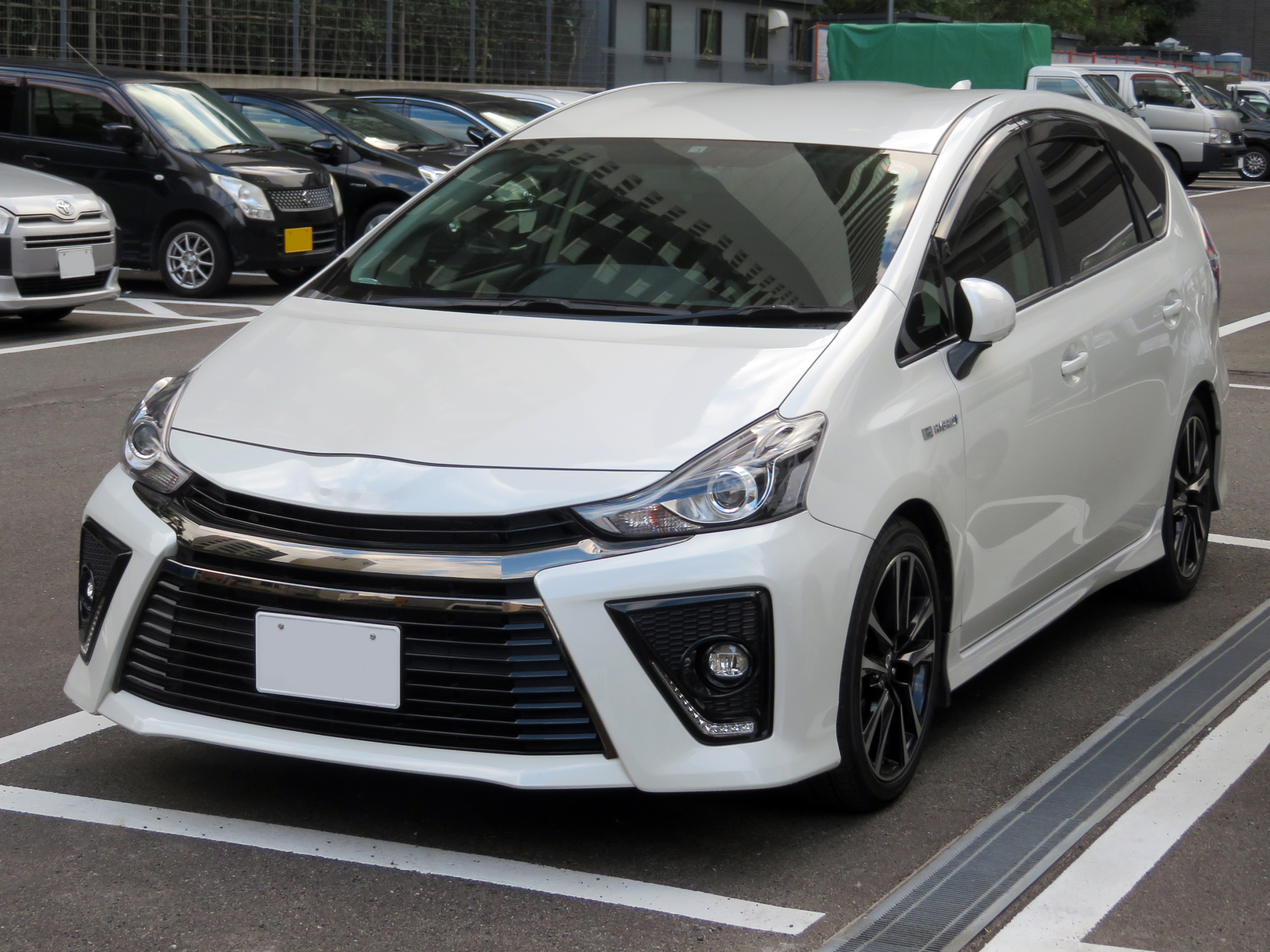
Toyota Prius α S Touring Selection G's

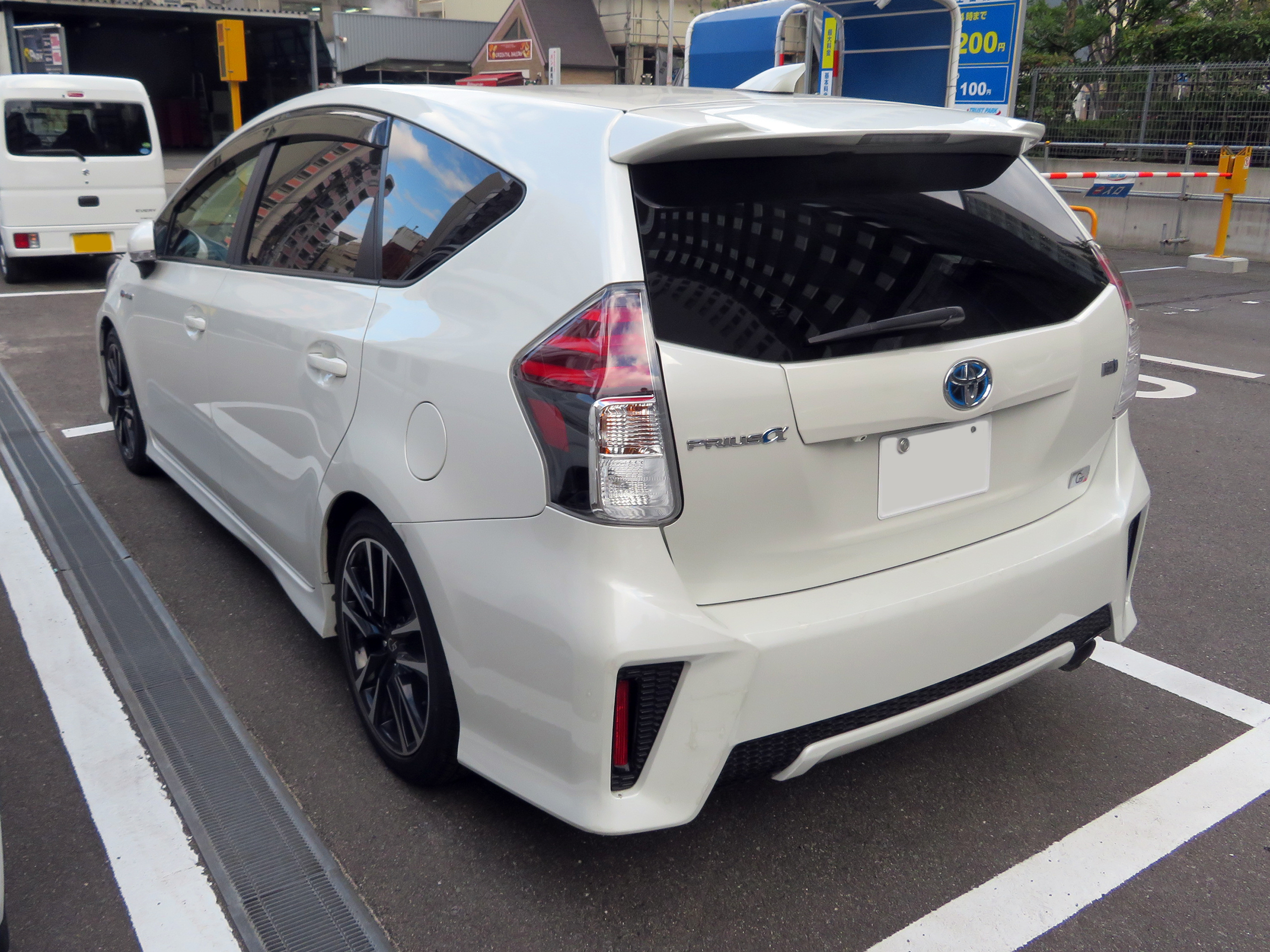
2015 Toyota Prius α S Touring Selection G's

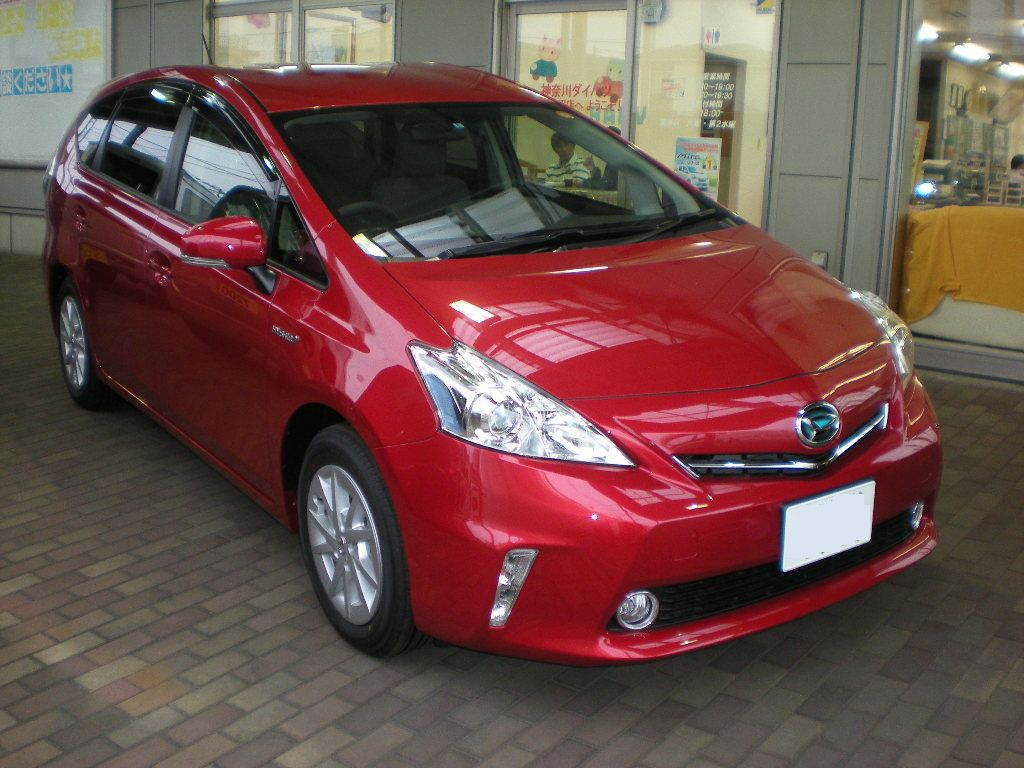
Daihatsu Mebius

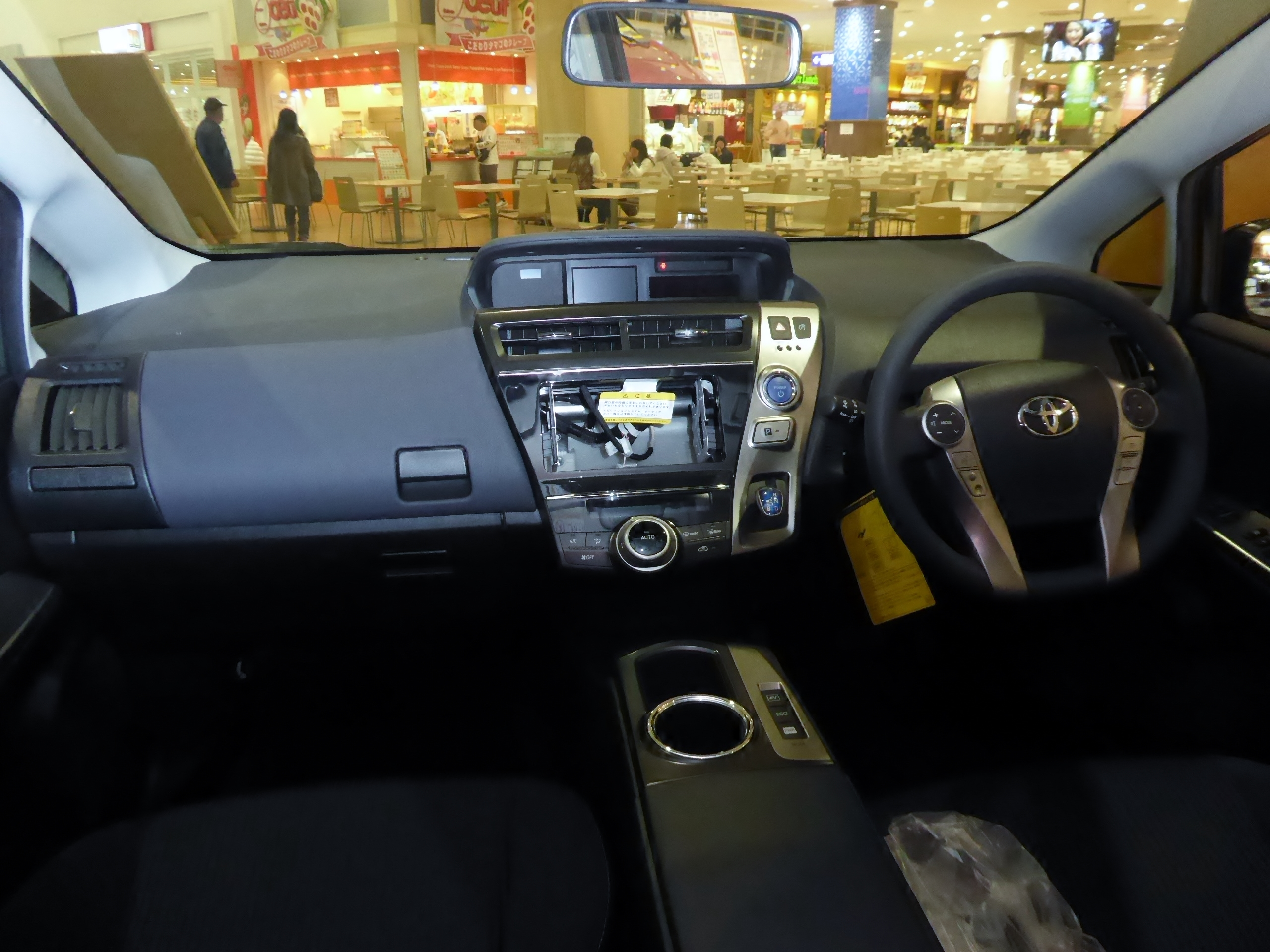
Toyota Prius α S interior

=== Australia ===
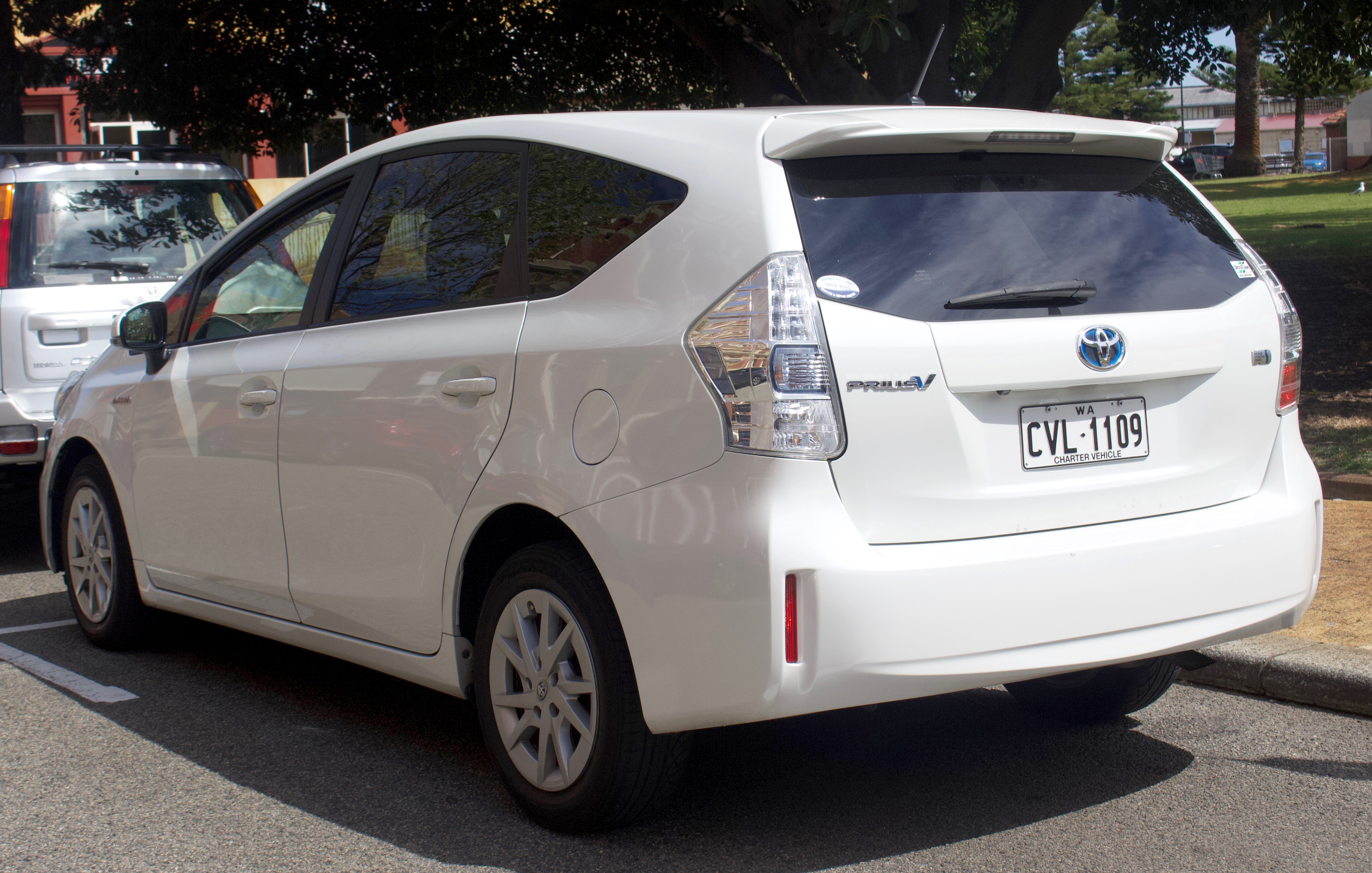
Prius V (Australia)

The Prius v was launched in Australia in May 2012. The 7-seat version with lithium-ion battery was the only model and was available two specifications; base and i-Tech. Standard features included a 6.1-inch display-screen audio system, automatic air-conditioning, 16-inch alloy wheels, energy monitor, head-up display, keyless entry and ignition, daytime-sensing headlamps, fog lamps, cruise control, daytime running lamps, and a reversing camera. However the i-Tech included features such as leather, LED headlamps, Radar Dynamic Cruise Control, Pre-Collision Safety System, Panoramic roof and Satellite navigation. According to ADR81/02 the Prius v returns fuel economy of 4.4 L/100 km (64 mpg_{‑imp}; 53 mpg_{‑US}) and CO_{2} emissions of 101 g/km.

Sales in 2014 totaled 722 units, ahead of the third-generation Prius hatch (487). As of April 2016, cumulative sales since introduction totaled 3,430 units.

=== Canada ===
Sales of the Canadian Prius v began in October 2011. The Prius v sold 553 units during 2011, 4,077 in 2012, and fell to 2,640 in 2013, and to 1,442 in 2014. Sales climbed to 2,497 units in 2015. Cumulative sales through April 2016 reached 12,670 units.

=== Europe ===
The European version is named Prius+ and was launched in June 2012. The European is offered with a lithium-ion battery, with three rows of seats with accommodations for seven passengers. Cumulative sales in the region totaled 38,200 units through April 2016.

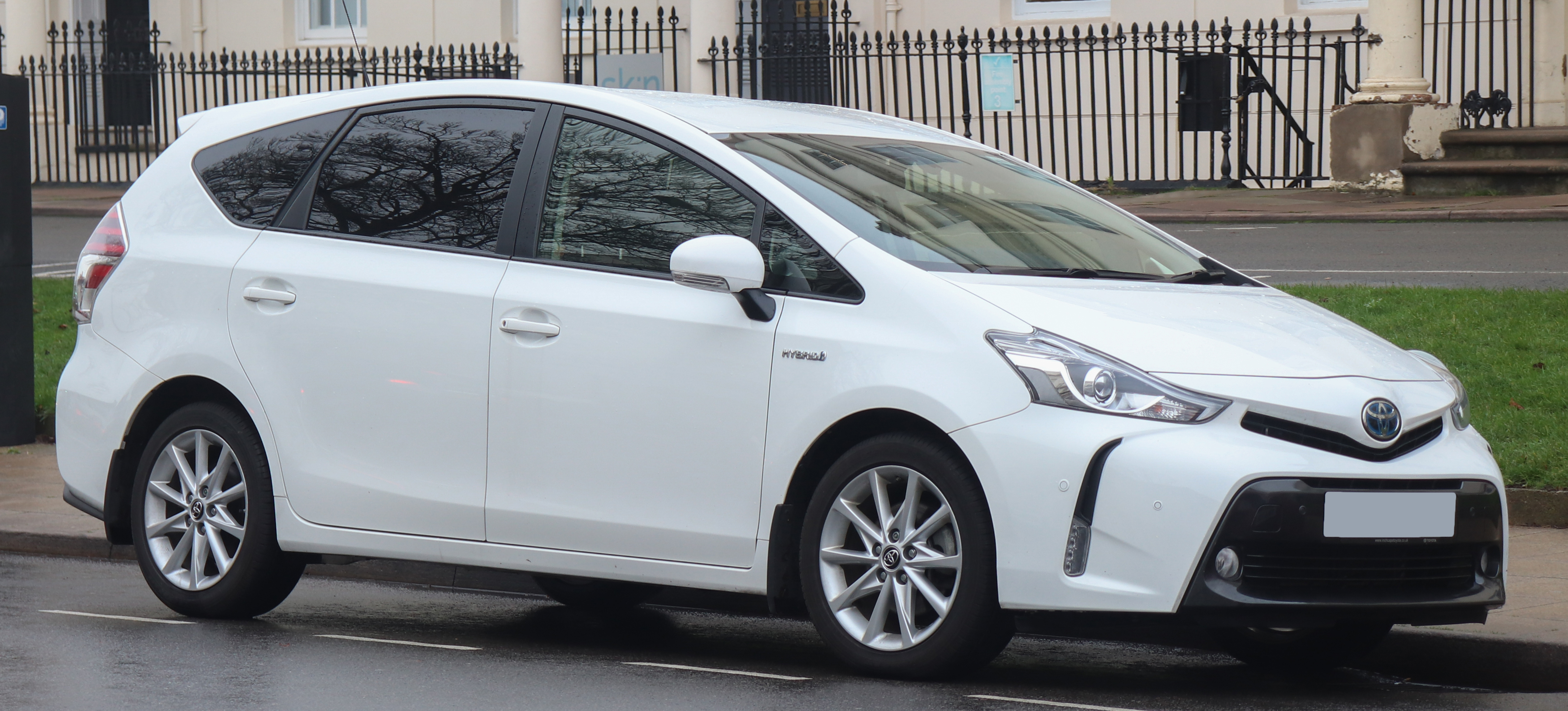

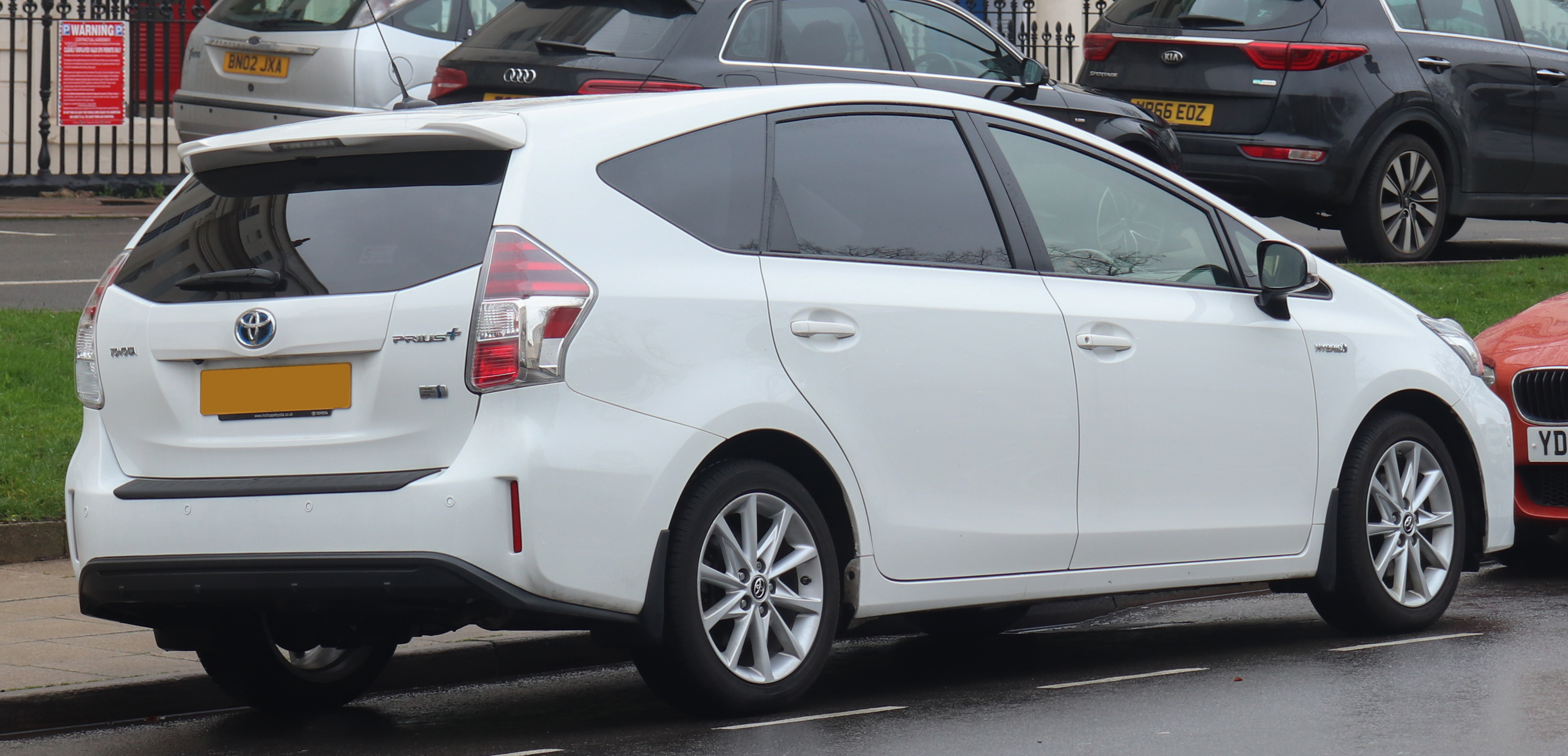
Toyota Prius+ Excel (UK; facelift)

France

Three trims are offered in the country, Active, Dynamic and Lounge.

Spain

The Prius+ was released in June 2012.

United Kingdom

Deliveries of the Prius+ began in July 2012. The hybrid MPV is offered in two trims: the base T4 that delivers 68.9 mpg_{‑imp} (4.10 L/100 km; 57.4 mpg_{‑US}) on a combined cycle and carbon dioxide emissions of 96 g/km, and the T Spirit with a fuel economy of 64.2 mpg_{‑imp} (4.40 L/100 km; 53.5 mpg_{‑US}) and carbon dioxide emissions of 101 g/km. Due to its emissions being lower than 100 g/km, the T4 version is exempted from road tax. Cars appropriately enrolled in an incentive scheme, on or before 27 June 2013, will also enjoy exemption from the London congestion charge until 24 June 2016, provided the registered keeper of the vehicle remains unchanged.

=== Hong Kong ===
The lithium-ion battery, seven seater version of Prius v was launched in Hong Kong SAR in April 2012. Two variants are available, in Luxury and Super luxury trims. The latter adds a twin moonroof and leather seats.

=== Singapore ===
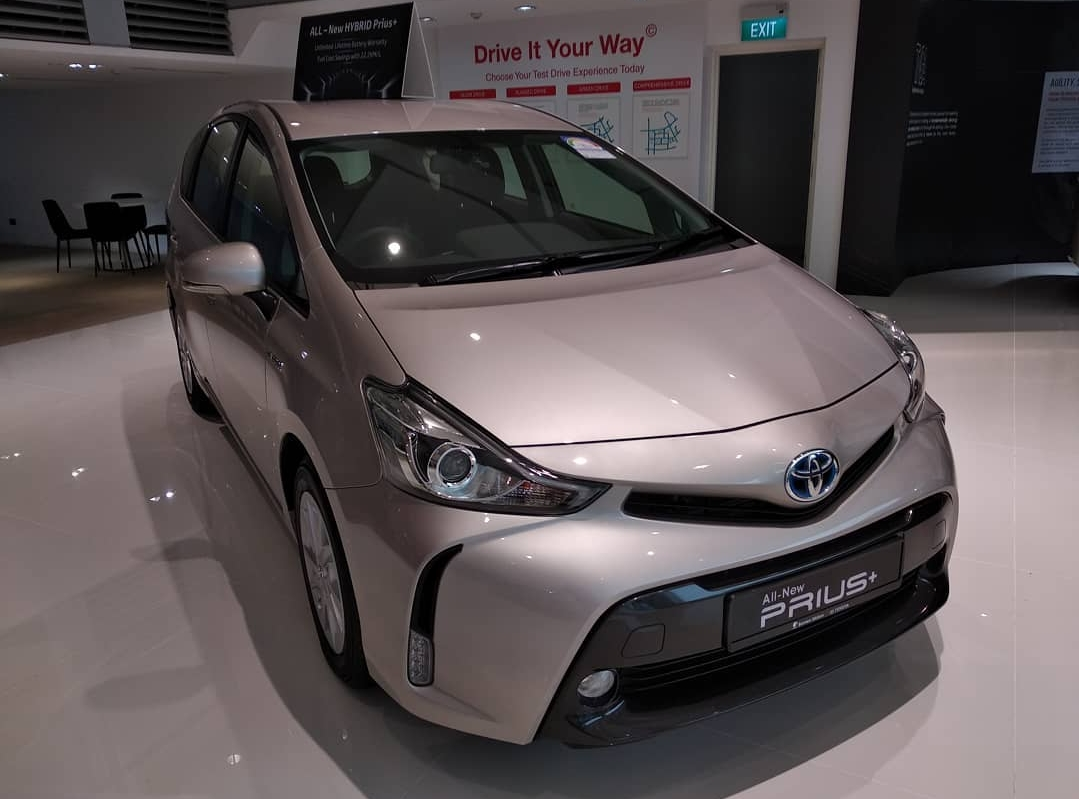
Toyota Prius+ (Singapore)

It was named as the Prius+ and was sold by local distributor Borneo Motors as a mid-sized MPV from 2018. It replaced the Toyota Wish, which was discontinued in Japan and Singapore in 2017. The sales tagline was "More Than You Wished For." Only one variant, featuring a 1.8-litre petrol engine paired to an electric motor, delivering up to 134 hp (100 kW) and 142 N⋅m (105 lbf⋅ft) of torque, with a combined fuel economy of 4.5 L/100 km (52.3 mpg_{‑US}; 62.8 mpg_{‑imp}) was available. It was discontinued in 2023.

=== United States ===
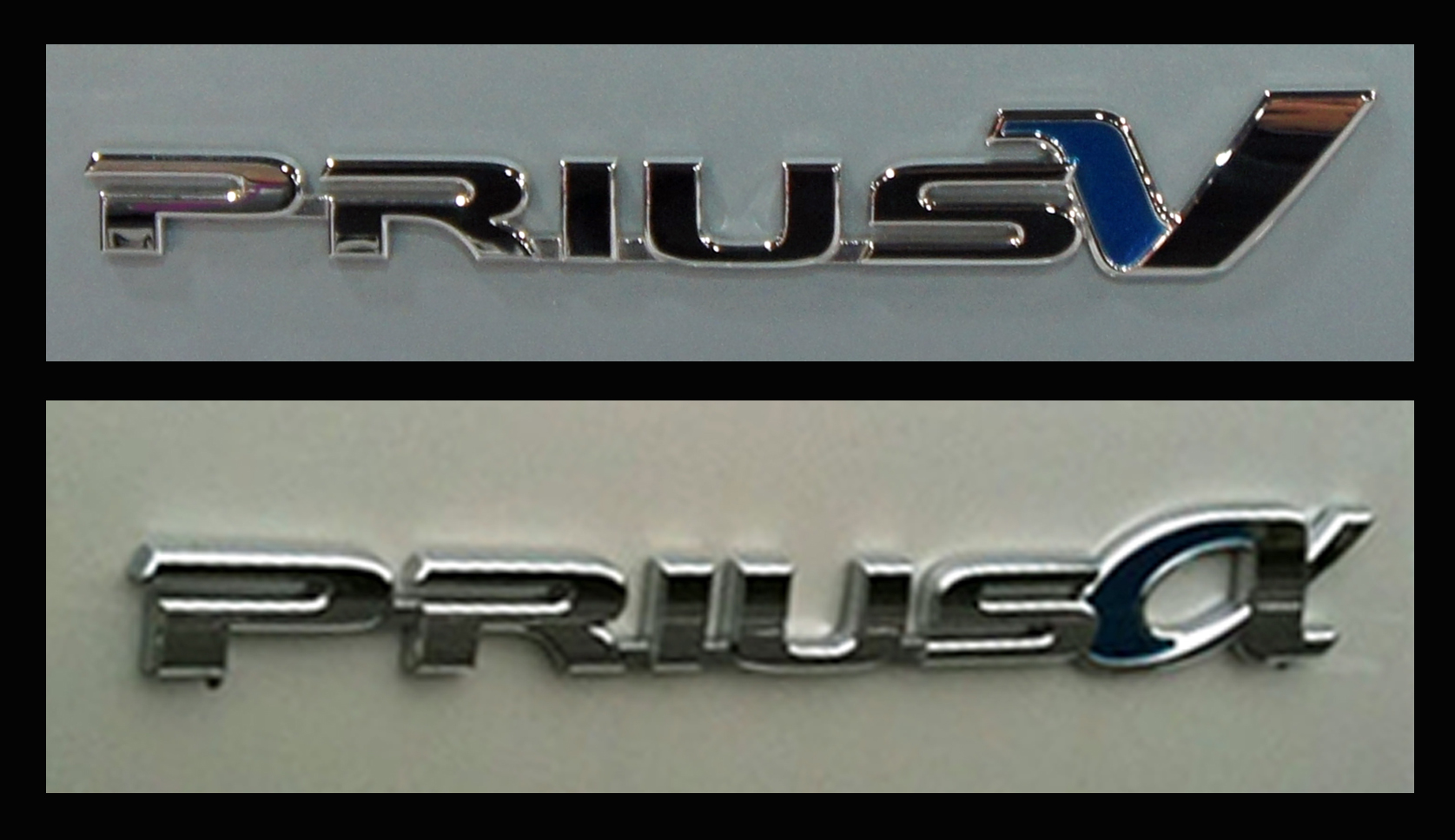
Badges for the Prius v (top) and Prius α (bottom)

Toyota began sales of the Prius v in the U.S. in October 2011 with a nickel-metal hydride battery pack similar to the 2010 model year Prius, and with two rows of seats to accommodate five passengers. The European and Japanese versions are offered with a lithium-ion battery, with three rows of seats with accommodations for seven passengers. Toyota's sales target is about 15 to 20% of conventional Prius sales in the United States, which represents around 30,000 units a year. With the Prius v, Toyota wanted to expand its customer base to include young families with children looking for a hybrid more spacious than the Prius. A total of 8,399 Prius v's were sold during 2011, climbed to 40,669 units in 2012, and fell to 34,989 in 2013, and to 30,762 in 2014. Sales continued to decline in 2015 to 28,290 units, down 8% from 2014. As of April 2016, cumulative sales totaled 148,079 units.

The Prius v in the U.S. was offered in three configurations: the base Prius v Two, the mid-range Prius v Three, and the premium-level Prius v Five. The Prius v Three adds standard display audio with navigation and the Toyota Entune multimedia system. In addition to standard features on the Prius v Two and Three, the Prius v Five adds standard SofTex-trimmed seats, heated front seats, three-door smart key, 17-inch alloy wheels, LED headlamps, and fog lamps. All trims come with a Bluetooth wireless connection for compatible hands-free phone calls and a USB port that allows playing of music and video from portable audio devices, and includes full iPod integration.

U.S. sales of the Prius v were discontinued at the end of the 2017 model year as sales had fallen considerably since the 2016 launch of the Toyota RAV4 Hybrid.

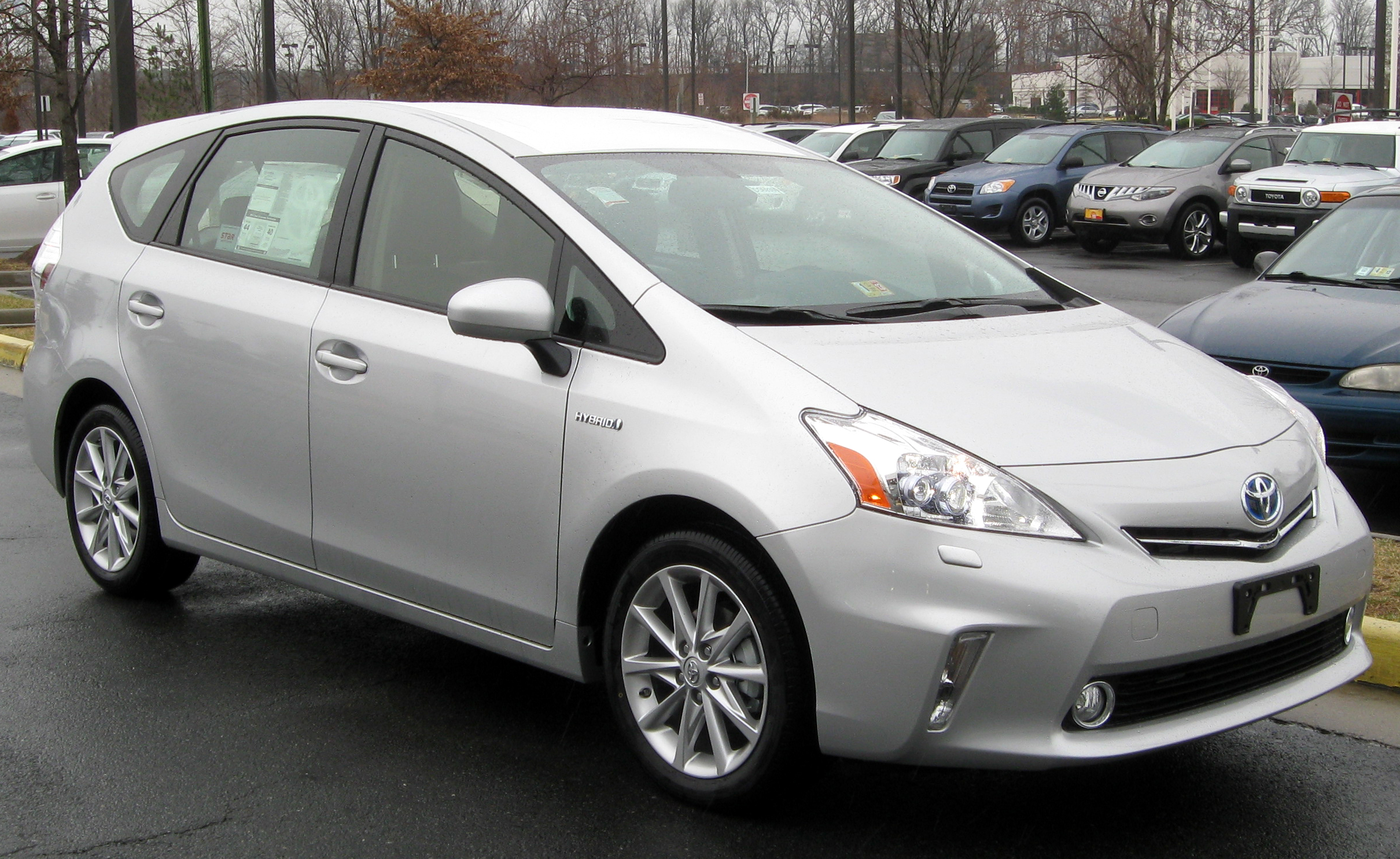
2012 Prius v

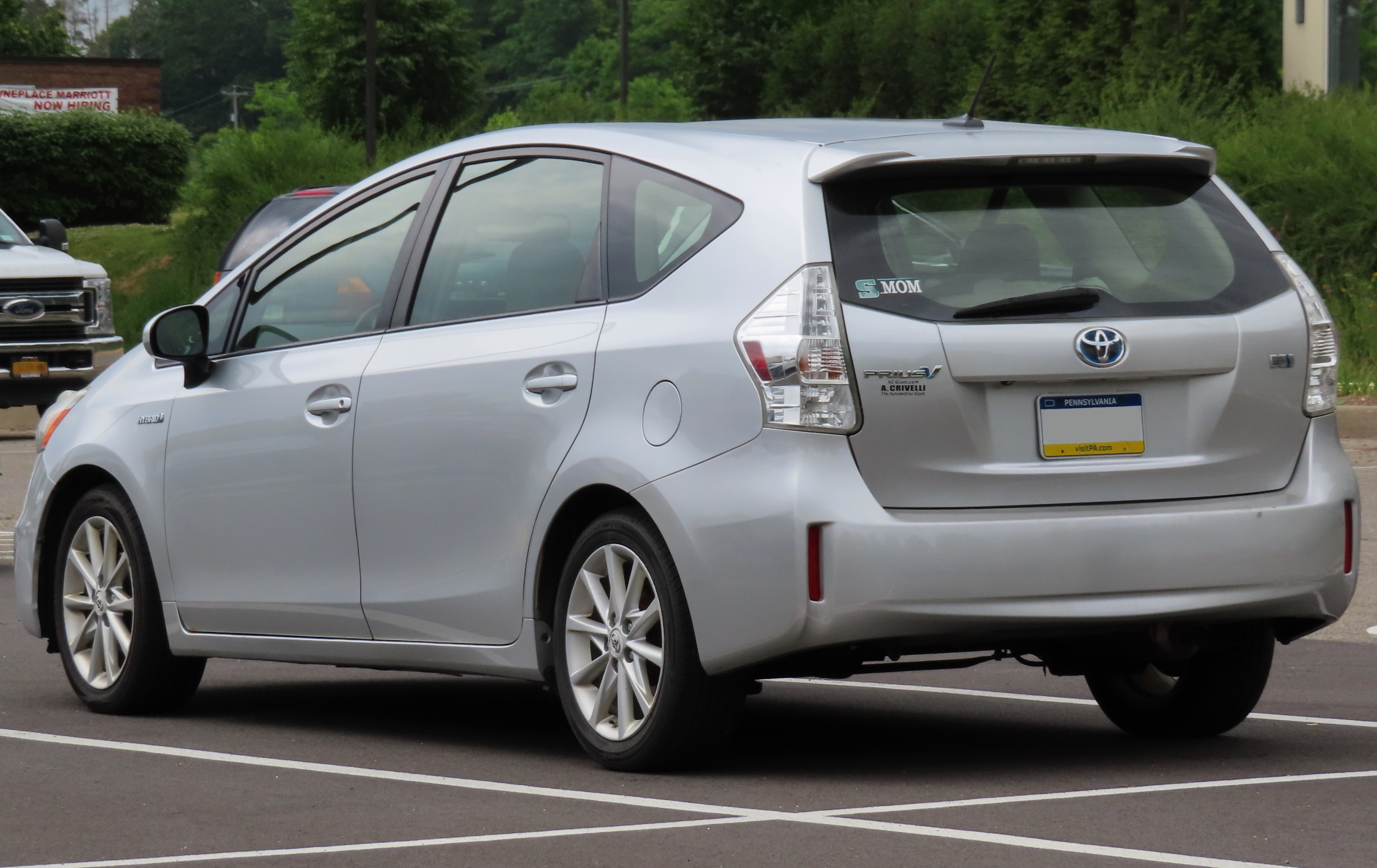
Rear view

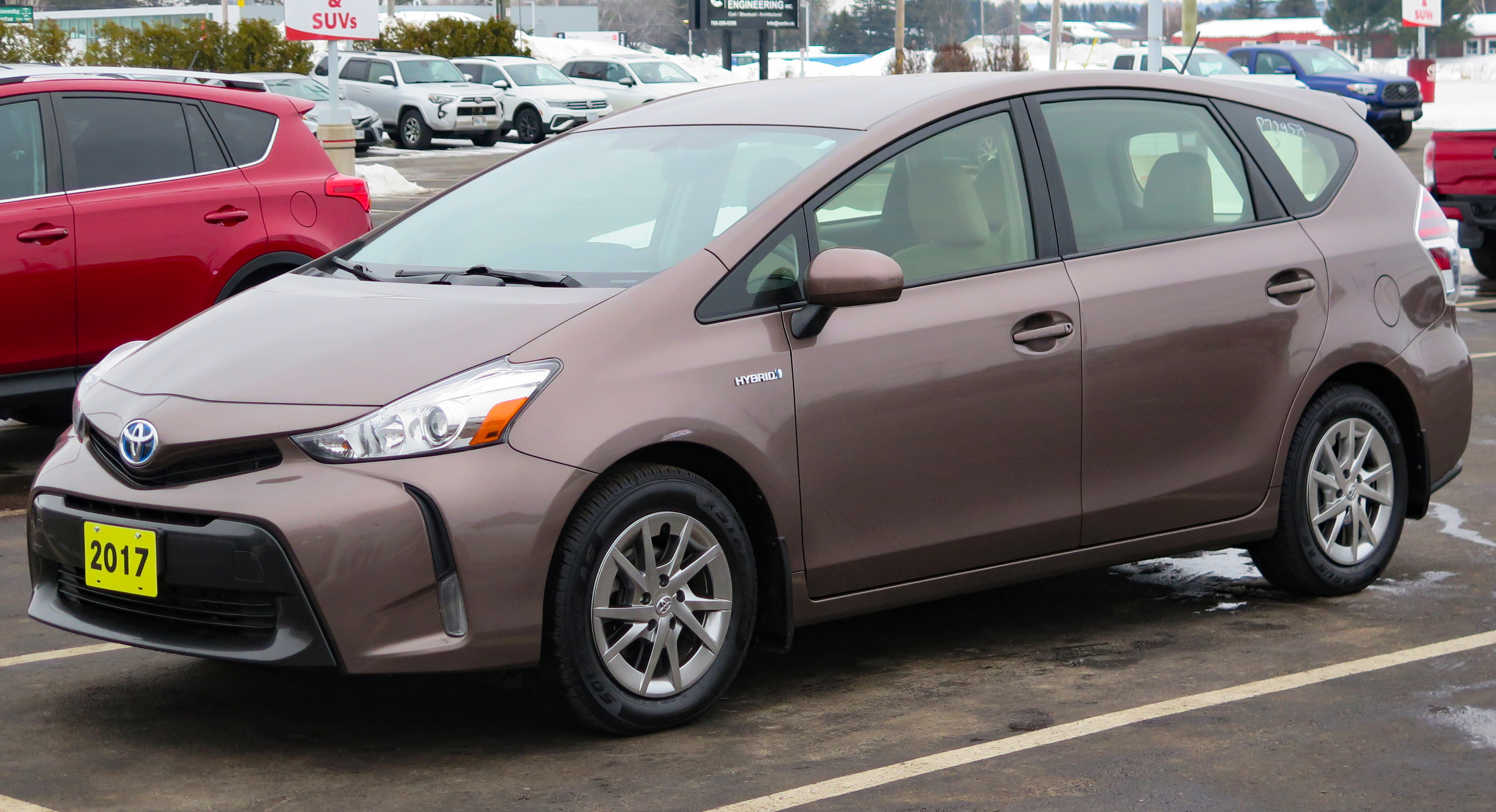
2017 Prius v

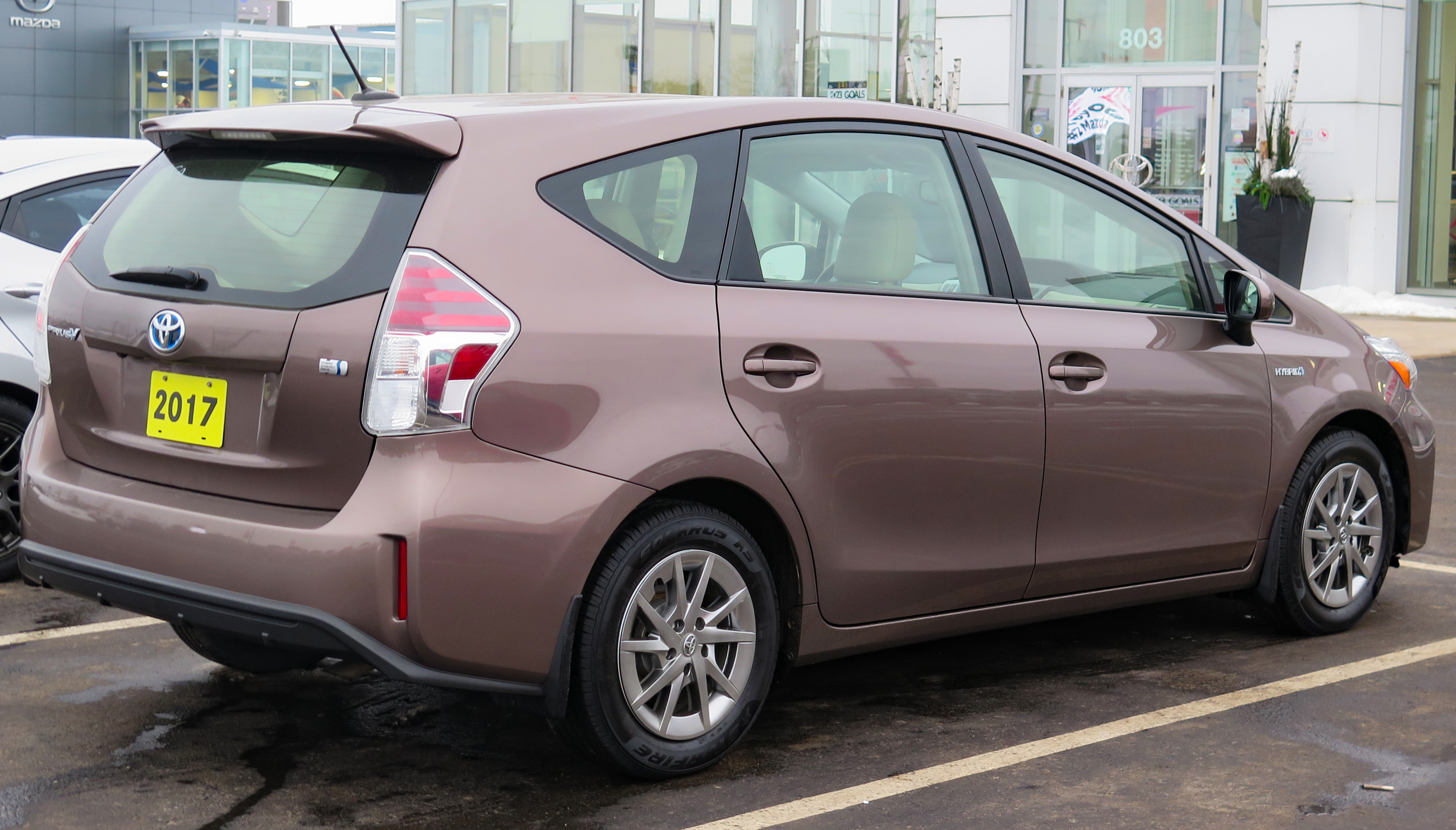
Rear view

== Recognition ==
The 2012 Prius v was selected among the five finalists for the 2012 Green Car of the Year to be awarded by the Green Car Journal in November 2011 at the Los Angeles Auto Show. The Prius Alpha was also shortlisted for 2012 Car of The Year Japan. Shared with the Toyota Prius Plug-in Hybrid, the Prius v was awarded Green Car Report's Best Car to Buy 2012.

== Replacement ==
The Prius V was discontinued in the United States after the 2017 model year, with the XA40 RAV4 Hybrid indirectly taking its place. Japanese production was discontinued in March 2021. In Australia and New Zealand, it was indirectly replaced by the larger XU70 Kluger Hybrid in July 2021. The Prius+ was withdrawn from the European market without being directly replaced, although there are alternatives such as the XA50 RAV4 Hybrid and E210 Corolla Touring Sports Hybrid in the line-up.

== See also ==
- Toyota Prius
- Toyota Prius c
- Toyota Prius Plug-in Hybrid
