= Autonet Mobile =

- Type: Privately held company
- Industry: Telematics, automotive industry
- Founded: 2005
- Founders: Sterling Pratz, Doug Moeller
- Headquarters: Santa Rosa, California, U.S.
- Area served: United States
- Products: In-vehicle telematics devices, mobile Wi-Fi routers, automotive dealership software
- Services: Telematics, marketing and management software

Autonet Mobile was a Santa Rosa, California based company that provided 4G in-vehicle telematics devices, and marketing and management software for automotive dealerships and aftermarket service providers. The company held several original equipment manufacturer agreements with the automotive manufacturers General Motors, Chrysler, Dodge, Jeep, Subaru, and Volkswagen. As of 2009, the Autonet Mobile routers were primarily available as a factory installed product that required activation, although they were also available as an aftermarket product through auto dealerships and retailers as well as online retailers such as Amazon.com. In early 2011, it was estimated that there were 10,000 Autonet Mobile users in the United States.

== History ==
Autonet Mobile was founded in 2005 by Sterling Pratz and Doug Moeller in Sonoma County, California. The company developed a mobile router that connected to 3G cellular networks to create a mobile Wi-Fi hotspot. Autonet Mobile launched its services in 2007. They presented at the International Consumer Electronics show in 2008 and by 2009 had reported a sales increase of 221% in the first quarter. General Motors and Subaru began offering the Autonet Mobile service as a dealer-installed option in 2009 with Mercedes and the Chevrolet Silverado adopting the Wi-Fi device in 2012. The company partnered with Robert Bosch GmbH to manufacture an embedded telematics unit to interface with a vehicle's CAN bus.

== Other uses ==
Autonet Mobile's Wi-Fi devices were sold to counties in Florida, Arizona, Colorado, Missouri, and Washington, D.C. for use in school buses, which prompted the development of internal content filters. In 2011, the Southside EMS department in Chatham County, Georgia equipped 35 ambulances with the Autonet Mobile Wi-Fi routers, allowing EMS technicians to file trip reports and share EKG information with hospitals while en route.
