= Advanced Automatic Collision Notification =

Advanced Automatic Collision Notification (AACN) is the successor to Automatic Collision Notification (ACN). The Centers for Disease Control and Prevention and the CDC Foundation partnered with OnStar and the General Motors Foundation to develop procedures to help emergency medical responders determine whether a motorist needs care at a trauma center after a vehicle crash. Through this partnership, the CDC conducted a vehicle telematics initiative to develop evidence-based protocols for the emergency medical community to effectively use automotive telemetry data.

By enabling responders to identify, diagnose, and treat injuries faster, this data can help reduce death and injuries among crash victims. CDC convened a panel of emergency medical physicians, trauma surgeons, public safety, and vehicle safety experts to consider how real-time AACN and similar systems can be used to determine whether injured patients need trauma center care.

The data may include information about crash severity, direction of impact, airbag deployment, number of impacts, and rollovers. Advisors can relay this information to emergency dispatchers, helping them to quickly determine the appropriate personnel, equipment, and facilities.

== Vehicular Emergency Data Set (VEDS) ==
The Vehicular Emergency Data Set is an XML-based standard for reporting collision data elements and medical data elements. The standard was developed by the ComCARE Alliance. This data set can be transmitted to a response center, which can forward it to emergency service providers. In the U.S., the Next Generation 9-1-1 initiative was to enable a Public Safety Answering Point to automatically receive and process this data, thereby speeding responses to a vehicle emergency, even when all vehicle occupants are incapacitated.

== See also ==
- eCall
- IEEE Intelligent Transportation Systems Society
- Ford Sync's 911 Assist
- Lexus Link
- Safety Connect (Toyota)
- BMW Assist
- GPS tracking
- Collision avoidance system
