= OnStar =

Subsidiary of General Motors

OnStar Corporation
- Type: Subsidiary
- Founded: 1996; 30 years ago
- Headquarters: Detroit, Michigan, U.S.
- Key people: Santiago Chamorro, Vice President
- Products: Vehicle security, emergency services, hands-free calling, turn-by-turn navigation, remote diagnostics
- Parent: General Motors
- Website: onstar.com

OnStar Corporation is a subsidiary of General Motors that provides subscription-based telematics services, including communications, in-vehicle security, emergency services, turn-by-turn navigation, and remote diagnostics systems throughout the United States, Canada, Chile, China, Mexico, Europe, Brazil, Colombia, Argentina and the Gulf Cooperation Council countries.

A similar service known as "Vauxhall/Opel OnStar" was available in western Europe and "ChevyStar" in Latin American markets (except in Brazil and Argentina). In September 2011 the president of OnStar stated that the service had more than six million customers. On May 9, 2018, Vauxhall Motors announced that Vauxhall OnStar, alongside Opel OnStar services, would cease to operate after December 31, 2020, following Groupe PSA's purchase of Vauxhall Motors and Opel from GM.

A new aftermarket interior rear-view mirror with a built-in OnStar module, branded as OnStar FMV, became publicly available on July 24, 2011. It provides some of the features an OEM system has, such as Automatic Crash Response, Stolen Vehicle Tracking, Turn-by-Turn Navigation, and Roadside Assistance.

== Overview ==
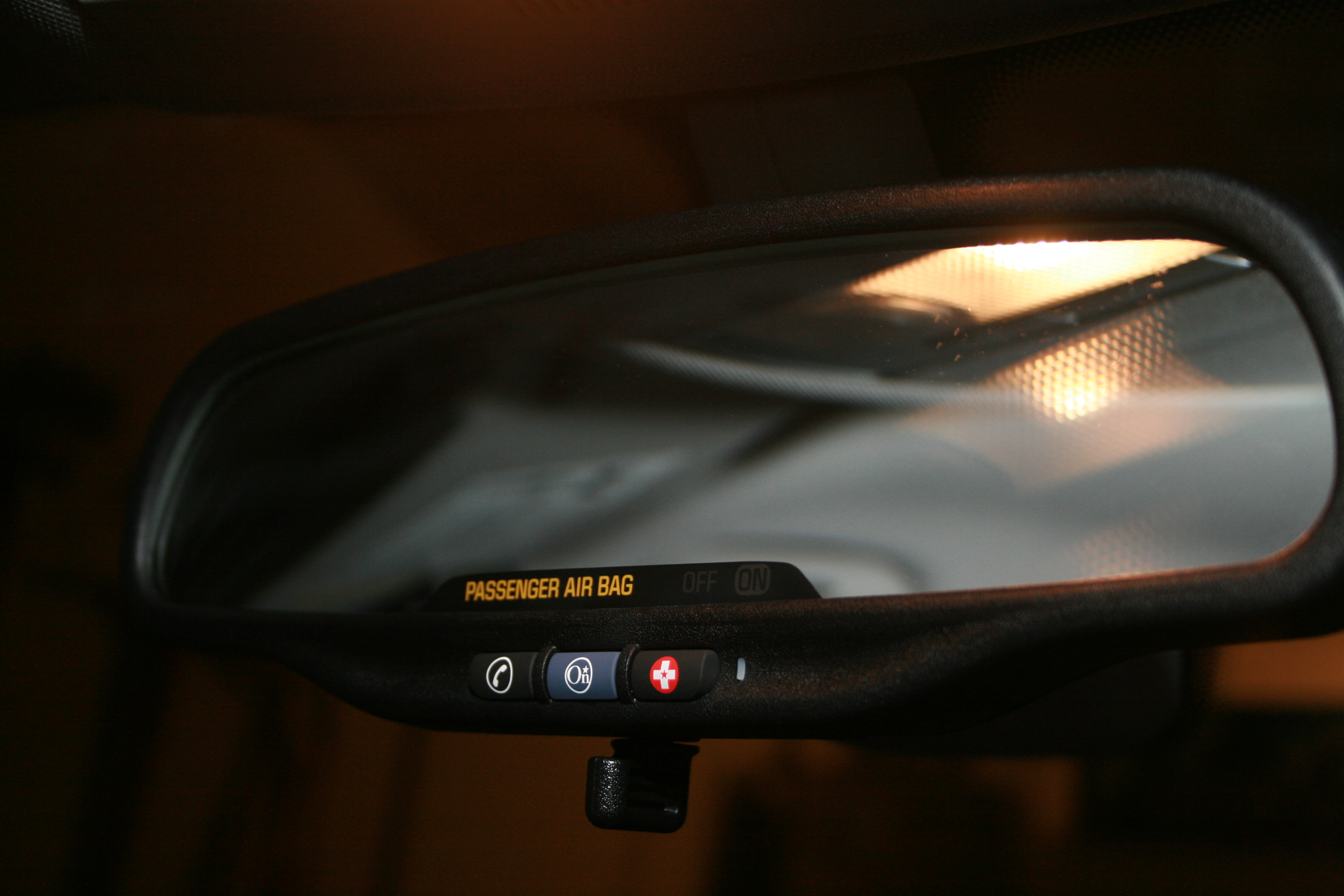
Onstar unit in a 2008 Chevrolet Impala

The OnStar service relied on CDMA mobile phone voice and data communication, primarily via Verizon Wireless in the United States and Bell Mobility in Canada, as well as location information using GPS technology, a core component of automatic vehicle location. More recently, TELUS and Onstar announced a new arrangement in 2021 for 4G and 5G in-vehicle mobility services. Drivers and passengers can use its audio interface to contact OnStar representatives for emergency services, vehicle diagnostics and directions.

The OnStar service allows users to contact OnStar call centers during an emergency. In the event of a collision, detected by airbag deployment or other sensors, Advanced Automatic Collision Notification features can automatically send information about the vehicle's condition and GPS location to OnStar call centers. OnStar has 24-hour emergency call centers in Warren, Michigan; Charlotte, North Carolina; and Ontario, Canada, and other call centers in Makati, Philippines; and Oshawa, Ontario. This Advanced Automatic Collision Notification service is designed to assist emergency response efforts.

All OnStar-equipped vehicles have a Stolen Vehicle Tracking feature, which can provide the police with the vehicle's exact location, speed, and direction of movement.

Starting in the 2009 model year, General Motors began equipping some new vehicles with Stolen Vehicle Slowdown. This feature allows OnStar to remotely slow down the stolen vehicle. The service is also expected to help reduce the risk of property damage, serious injuries or fatalities resulting from high-speed pursuits of stolen vehicles. Customers may opt out of that function. The first successful use of this service occurred in October 2009 when a stolen Chevrolet Tahoe was recovered, and its suspected thief was apprehended.

Also in 2009, General Motors began equipping some new vehicles with Remote Ignition Block, allowing OnStar to remotely deactivate the ignition so when the stolen vehicle is shut off, it cannot be restarted.

All Stolen Vehicle Assistance services (Stolen Vehicle Tracking, Stolen Vehicle Slowdown and Remote Ignition Block) are functions of the vehicle's tracking system and can be requested by the OnStar subscriber, but OnStar will not activate them until confirming with the police that the vehicle has been reported as stolen.

OnStar subscribers may be eligible for anti-theft and low mileage insurance discounts. Since OnStar can help with the recovery of a stolen vehicle, some insurance companies recognize this and offer a discount. Also, with certain insurance companies (for example, GMAC Insurance) and with subscriber permission, OnStar will send the insurance company the vehicle's odometer reading every month. If the subscriber qualifies as a low-mileage driver, they may be eligible for an insurance discount.

Even if the vehicle is OnStar equipped, no OnStar services are available until the system is activated. All new and certified pre-owned OnStar equipped GM vehicles include a three-month free trial, after which, vehicle owners can choose between various plans:

- Connected Access: Free for 10 years: includes Vehicle Diagnostics, Dealer Maintenance Notification, Chevrolet Smart Driver, and Marketplace
- App Access: $15/mo, includes In-Vehicle Streaming Audio Apps, Alexa Built-In, and Connected Navigation
- Remote Access: $14.99/mo or $149.90/yr, includes Remote Key Fob, Family Link, On-Demand Diagnostics, Vehicle Locate, and Remote Personalization
- OnStar Guardian App: $15/mo, Take OnStar on the go. An app that supports Automatic Crash Response, Emergency Services, and Roadside assistance outside an OnStar-equipped vehicle
- Unlimited Access: $29.99/mo, includes all services in Remote Access, plus Alexa Built-In, Connected Navigation, and access to 4G LTE Data
- Safety & Security: $29.99/mo or $299.90/yr, includes Automatic Crash Response, Emergency Services, Roadside Assistance, Crisis Alert, Stolen Vehicle Assistance, and Turn-By-Turn Navigation
- Remote Access + Safety & Security: $39.99/mo or $399.90/yr, includes all services in the Remote Access and Safety & Security Plans
- Unlimited Access + Safety & Security: $49.99/mo, includes all services in the Unlimited Access and Safety & Security Plans

Mobile data access in the vehicle can be added with extra service plans, provided by TELUS in Canada.

In June 2022, GM began to include a three-year, prepaid OnStar and Connected Services premium subscription as a standard option on Buick, Cadillac, and GMC models, at a value of US$1,500. This subscription is a mandatory option included in the price of the vehicle, even if the owner does not intend to use the services.

Legacy Plans no longer able to be purchased:

- Basic: Free for first 5 years, which includes Remote Access, Advanced Diagnostics and Smart Driver which provides advice on driving style
- Protection: $19.99/mo, which includes Advanced Automatic Collision Notification, Emergency Services, Crisis Assist, Roadside Assistance, Remote Access, Advanced Diagnostics and 24/7 access to Advisors
- Security: $24.99/mo, includes all services in the Protection plan, plus Stolen Vehicle Assistance
- Guidance: $34.99/mo, includes all services in the Security plan, plus turn-by-turn navigation, OnStar AtYourService, and 30 Hands-Free Calling Minutes

== History ==
OnStar was formed in 1996 as a collaboration between GM, Electronic Data Systems and Hughes Electronics Corporation. Each of the founding companies brought a specific area of expertise to the enterprise: GM brought vehicle design and integration and a distribution system of millions of vehicles, EDS brought much of the systems development and information management and customer service technologies, while Hughes (creators of DirecTV) contributed communications and satellite technology and automotive electronics.

In 1996, GM North America Operations president Rick Wagoner officially launched OnStar at the Chicago Auto Show. OnStar delivered its first product and service to the market in 11 months, in the fall of 1996 for model-year 1997 Cadillac DeVille, Cadillac Seville, and Cadillac Eldorado models. From 2002 to 2006, OnStar service was available on vehicles produced by Acura, Audi, Isuzu, Subaru, and Volkswagen through a licensing agreement.

In April 2006, GM notified approximately 500,000 of their OnStar customers who had analog service that their service would be terminated effective December 31, 2007, because starting February 18, 2008 the Federal Communications Commission (FCC) would no longer require US cell phone systems to operate in analog mode. Customers who purchased a prepaid, non-refundable, non-transferable 1-year OnStar Safe & Sound subscription were scheduled to receive an equipment upgrade. If the vehicle is from the 2003, 2004, or 2005 model year, an adapter costing approximately US$200 (includes a one-year subscription) can be installed at the customer's expense. If it is older, it will simply no longer be usable. A law firm in Pennsylvania representing some of the affected customers sought to have a class certified for a class-action lawsuit for damages claimed in the cancellation of OnStar service.

In September 2011, OnStar has changed its terms and conditions to allow sale of vehicle location and speeds to interested third parties including law enforcement agencies. On December 19, 2011, GM said OnStar would join with Verizon Wireless to offer video chat and streaming content to automobile passengers.

Since 2014 OnStar offers LTE Wi-Fi service on select GM cars.

Starting June 14, 2021, the OnStar Guardian app was made available to any driver in the United States or Canada. The Guardian app uses sensors in the phone, such as the accelerometer and the GPS receiver, to provide some traditional OnStar services (e.g., automatic crash notification), regardless of the vehicle in which the user is riding.

The Guardian app also serves as the user interface, via Bluetooth, to the OnStar Link plug-in device, if it is installed. OnStar Link is a miniature GPS receiver and 4G LTE IoT interface that plugs into the vehicle's OBD-II connector. It can provide most traditional OnStar services, including a WiFi hotspot (additional data plan required), though not Stolen Vehicle Slowdown, Hands-Free Calling, Turn-by-Turn Navigation, or Send-to-Navigation. Voice communication with an OnStar Advisor requires a Bluetooth-paired cell phone.

In September 2021, GM notified owners of certain pre-2015 model-year vehicles in the United States that their factory-installed OnStar equipment will become obsolete and non-functional after December 2022. These vehicles use Verizon Wireless's 2G/3G CDMA network for communication, and Verizon has announced plans to sunset this network. Unlike GM's remedy under similar circumstances for Canadian customers, where the vehicle hardware was updated, customers in the United States will be provided an OnStar Link plug-in at no additional charge.

In January 2025, OnStar entered into a settlement with the US Federal Trade Commission to prohibit sharing driver location and behavior data with third parties.

== Use as surveillance device ==
OnStar is theoretically susceptible to remote activation by malicious third parties or government agencies. This activation would enable third parties to track the location of the car, along with the ability to listen to the contents of any conversations carried on by the occupants within the car without their consent. However, the FBI has denied the ability to use this as it disables OnStar's safety features, as determined by the Ninth Circuit Court of Appeals. In its document of privacy practices, OnStar states that it is not possible for them to listen to or monitor conversations in a car without the knowledge of the occupant. The hardware is designed so that when an advisor calls into a car, a light flashes, a ring tone is heard, and the radio will mute.

In 2011, OnStar said that it would start retaining all the information collected by the GPS and internal system so that it could be sold to third parties (possibly insurance companies). Although this data is supposed to be "anonymized", exactly what OnStar means by anonymizing GPS data remains unclear, and it may be impossible to make the data actually anonymous. A few weeks later, after outcry from subscribers and privacy advocate groups, OnStar reversed the decision to continue collecting information from unsubscribed units.

A 2019 experiment hacking into the data collected by a 2017 Chevrolet Volt revealed that the car stored logs of calls made from the user's cell phone, as well as location and driving data, which could then be sold to third parties.

== Advertising campaigns ==
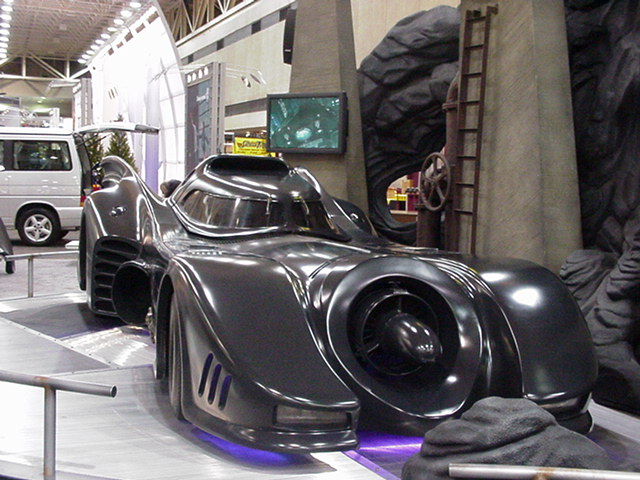
Batman Onstar Exhibit at the Dallas Auto Show

In 2000, GM produced a series of Batman OnStar commercials that featured Batman (using the Batmobile and props from the 1989 film) using the service to call people, access his mail, navigate to certain locations, and to unlock the Batmobile. These were discontinued in favour of radio commercials.

GM promoted the service with radio commercials demonstrating how it would work through "Real Call" advertising. It provided the recording of someone interacting with OnStar in various scenarios designed to show its utility. The commercials stated that these were recordings of actual instances of customers using the services, and gave the date on which they occurred.

From 2004 to 2009, OnStar was a sponsor for guest appearances on ESPN Radio programming, dubbed the "OnStar Hotline".

In September 2010 under then-President Chris Preuss, OnStar relaunched its brand with a series of commercials with the theme of "Live On". According to Chief Marketing Officer Sam Mancuso, the campaign was designed to change how people view OnStar, "It's not about waiting for something to happen but something people can use every day." Newer campaigns focus on safety, security, and connected devices.

Since 2008, OnStar has offered "Santa tracking" in all equipped vehicles around the festive period. This has allowed children worldwide to see Santa's location on Christmas Eve. Each time this feature is used, OnStar also made donations to various charities.

== Hardware ==
The OnStar hardware is fundamentally a Telematic control unit (TCU) that integrates the necessary communication and processing components for the service to function. GM is currently deploying OnStar Generation 10 hardware that includes enhanced services and diagnostics and the ability to use the mobile application RemoteLink, which allows a subscriber to perform many functions without the need for calling into the OnStar center. Functions include remote start, remote lock and unlock, flashing lights and horn as well as viewing up-to-date diagnostics data from the subscriber's iPhone or Android-powered mobile phone. As of 2011 OnStar hardware is currently only manufactured by LG Electronics, although early models were made by Hughes for Gen 1, Delphi for Gen 2, and Motorola for Gen 4 to Gen 6.

=== Analog ===
The Gen 1 to Gen 4 models were analog. All were for Class 2 bus. Gen 5 models were a transition period. Some Gen 5 models actually contained both analog and digital cellular phone modules. Also, there were both Class 2 and CAN bus models.

=== Digital ===
The Gen 6 and up models are CDMA digital. Some were Class 2 bus and some were CAN (Controller Area Network) bus.

=== Compatibility ===
Some Gen 5 and Gen 6 models were compatible with each other providing some upgrades to some customers to digital. Analog cellular was turned off in February 2008. Customers who had the Gen 1 through Gen 4 models were unable to upgrade to the digital Gen 6.

There is no compatibility in Gen 1 and 4 with other models, while there is some compatibility with Gen 2 and Gen 2.6 (Delphi TCU and Motorola cellular transceiver).

=== OnStar FMV (For My Vehicle) ===
In 2011, OnStar introduced the OnStar FMV system. The system, which embedded both the OnStar system, as well as Bluetooth hands-free connectivity, into an automatically dimming rear view mirror that replaced the existing rear view mirror in nearly any vehicle that was not equipped from the factory with the OnStar system. The system was able to provide all of the features of OnStar, except for those services which required integration of the vehicle's computer (such as Stolen Vehicle Slowdown and Automatic Airbag Deployment Notification). Instead, the system included sensors that detected irregular movement of the mirror and triggered a call to the OnStar emergency response center. Wireless service was provided through Verizon Wireless. The system was compatible with most vehicles manufactured from model year 2000 to 2014, as long as the vehicle was not equipped from the factory with the OnStar system, however, OnStar noted that the system "should not be installed in vehicles such as the Jeep Wrangler, Toyota FJ Cruiser, Hummer, Recreational Vehicle (RV's), or Semi Truck" due to the "extreme windshield angles and/or excessive size" and therefore had the "inability to detect a crash". Professional installation from an OnStar FMV retailer, such as select automotive dealerships and electronic retailers (such as Best Buy), was recommended. An annual OnStar subscription for the FMV cost US$299.00.

On March 3, 2014, OnStar announced that they would be discontinuing production and sales of the OnStar FMV system. While not citing a reason for the discontinuation of the FMV, OnStar said that they "have gained a number of key insights by launching OnStar FMV that will be very valuable as (we) investigate future ventures in the retail space". However, owners of the OnStar FMV would continue to receive service for their device as long as they continued to subscribe. Similar services are offered from the factory on more vehicles, with the initial service cost being included for a trial period, as well as offering more features, such as in-vehicle Wi-Fi connectivity via 3G or 4G LTE, enhanced accident response systems, remote ignition disabling, and remote control services of the vehicle.

== Vulnerability to hacking ==
On July 30, 2015, Samy Kamkar introduced OwnStar - a small electronic device that could be concealed on or near a General Motors vehicle to interpose itself between the vehicle's OnStar link and the driver's OnStar RemoteLink app. In this classic man-in-the-middle attack, Kamkar, or any unauthorized user, could substitute his OnStar commands to locate, unlock, or start the vehicle. By August 11, General Motors had released upgrades to the OnStar server software and RemoteLink app to block such attacks.

== See also ==
- Advanced Automatic Collision Notification
- Dashtop mobile
- eCall
- Ford SYNC
- GPS tracking unit
- Lexus Link
- LoJack
- MVEDR
- MyLink
- Vehicle tracking system
