= BMW Assist =

BMW subscription-based telematics and service system

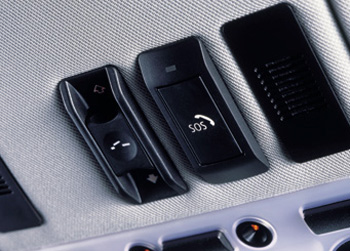
BMW Assist is typically activated using the SOS button

BMW Assist (also branded as MINI Assist) is a telematic roadside assistance service offered by BMW. BMW Assist is similar to GM's OnStar or Mercedes-Benz mbrace services as they both use the cellular network and Global Positioning telemetry to locate or guide the vehicle. BMW Assist can provide turn-by-turn directions, remote unlocking, vehicle diagnostics, airbag deployment notification, theft recovery and towing or flat tire repair. The service is included free in most new BMWs. After expiration, it can be purchased at a yearly rate. As of March, 2016, BMW assist is undergoing a "technology upgrade" in the US, and renewals are not being processed for MY2013 and older models. BMW has provided no estimated time for completion. Those whose memberships have expired no longer have the advantages of the Safety or Convenience plans. Members who have active service as of December 31, 2016 will have a choice to receive $200 compensation for losing service or to receive a hardware retrofit to continue service. There is a population for whom BMW did not allow renewal between March and December 2016, thus forcing them out of safety and security features.

== Technology ==
BMW Assist is integrated into the car's communication and audio systems. It works in conjunction with the navigation system (if equipped) or uses its own GPS equipment. The original BMW Assist system worked in conjunction with the AMPS cellular network for data transmission and voice communication. Current BMW Assist systems work using the GSM technology.

The car communicates via the cellular network with a Back-end system that receives and analyzes the information. Both voice and data (via SMS or GPRS) is transmitted. Dependent of the application, the information is routed for example to a call-center or presented on a web-site.

== Theft recovery ==
Theft recovery is an additional subscription service BMW Assist offers. This service is capable of tracking the location of the car via the car computer and GPS system.

Most BMW owners who are concerned about theft employ third-party tracking options. These devices have many advantages and disadvantages. Most devices are small and can be placed virtually anywhere in the vehicle. Some higher end devices also contain small power sources. These devices may take longer for the thief to detect, and may be more difficult to disable. The BMW system, however, is tied into the car's computer system and cannot be removed without rendering the vehicle immobile. Additionally, the BMW system utilizes the car's power reserve to amplify the cellular signal to three watts according to BMW's literature. Further signal gains are attributed to the use of the vehicle's large antenna which is several magnitudes larger than a cellphone antenna.

The BMW Assist system has an excellent track record if the theft is discovered within a short period of time.

== See also ==
- Advanced Automatic Collision Notification
- BMW Real Time Traffic information System
