= Remote diagnostics =

Act of diagnosing from a distance

Remote diagnostics is the act of diagnosing a given symptom, issue or problem from a distance. Instead of the subject being co-located with the person or system done diagnostics, with remote diagnostics the subjects can be separated by physical distance (e.g., Earth-Moon). Important information is exchanged either through wire or Wireless.

When limiting to systems, a general accepted definition is: "To improve reliability of vital or capital-intensive installations and reduce the maintenance costs by avoiding unplanned maintenance, by monitoring the condition of the system remotely."

== Process elements for remote diagnostics ==
- Remotely monitor selected vital system parameters
- Analysis of data to detect trends
- Comparison with known or expected behavior data
- After detected performance degradation, predict the failure moment by extrapolation
- Order parts and/or plan maintenance, to be executed when really necessary, but in time to prevent a failure or stop

== Typical uses ==
- Medical use (see Remote guidance)
- Formula One racecars
- Space (Apollo project and others)
- Telephone systems like a PABX
- Connected cars

== Reasons for use ==
- Limit local personnel to a minimum (Gemini, Apollo capsules: too tight to fit all technicians)
- Limit workload of local personnel
- Limit risks (exposure to dangerous environments)
- Central expertise (locally solve small problems, remotely/centralized solve complex problems by experts)
- Efficiency: reduce travel time to get expert and system or subject together

== Remote diagnostics and maintenance ==
Remote diagnostics and maintenance refers to both the diagnosis of faults and the ability to take corrective actions, such as changing settings, updating software, or adjusting system parameters to improve performance and prevent problems such as breakdown, wear, or failure. RDM enables specialists to access equipment from a central location, reducing the need for on-site personnel and helping to avoid hazardous or inaccessible environments.

As machinery and software systems become more complex and globally distributed, remote engineering reduces the need for travel by experienced and costly technical staff. In the automotive industry, remote diagnostics is commonly used for electronic control unit programming, software updates, and advanced driver-assistance system (ADAS) calibration. Workshops and fleet operators may connect vehicles to remote engineering platforms, allowing specialist technicians to perform diagnostic procedures and configuration tasks without being physically present, particularly when manufacturer-level tools, security access, or specialist knowledge are required.

== See also ==
- Real-time computing
- Telemetry
