= Handsfree =

Equipment that can be used without the use of hands

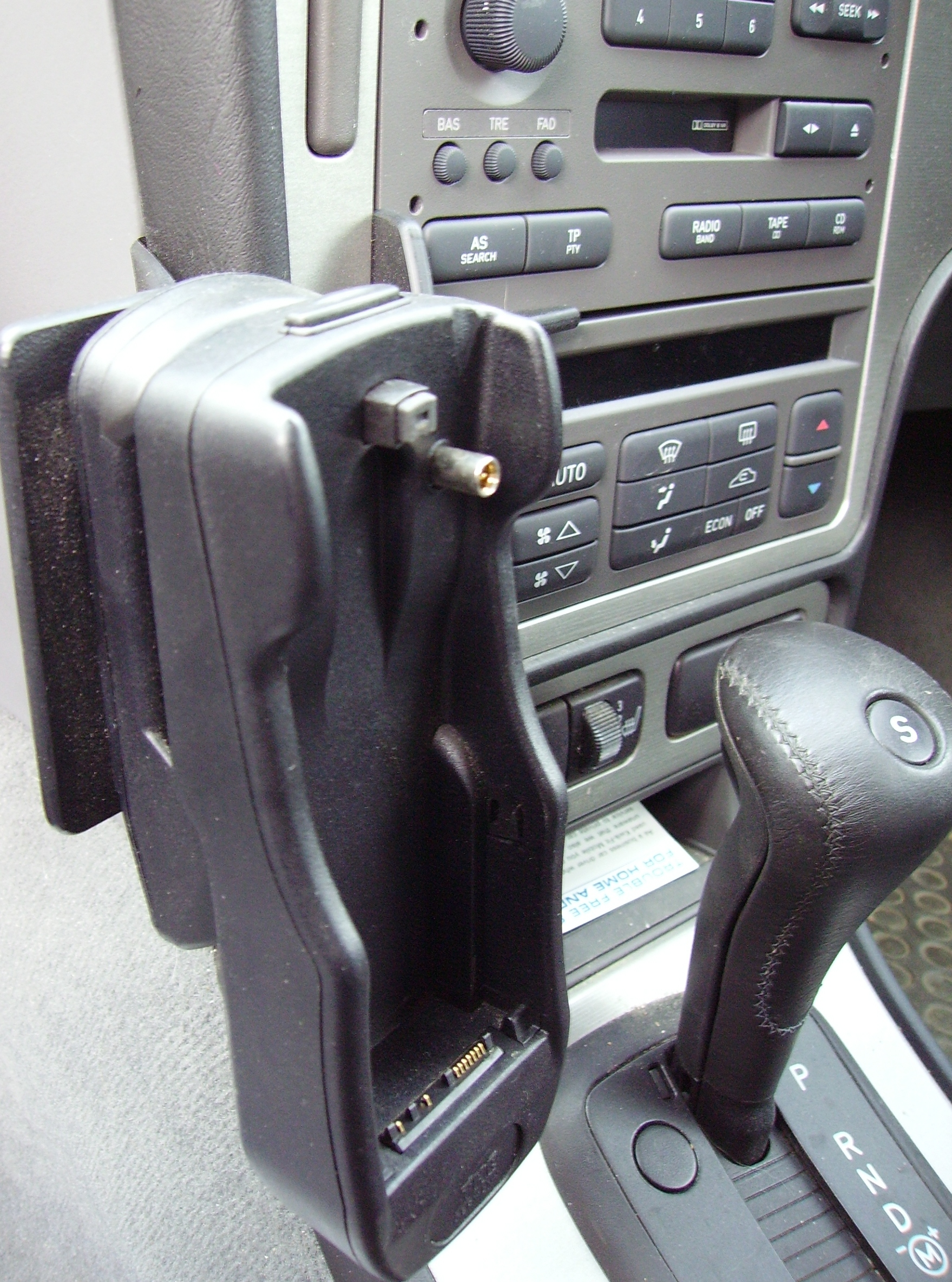
Hands-free phone kit fitted to a Saab 9-5.

Handsfree is an adjective describing equipment that can be used without the use of hands (for example via voice commands) or, in a wider sense, equipment which needs only limited use of hands, or for which the controls are positioned so that the hand can occupy themselves with another task (such as driving) without needing to hunt far afield for the controls.

Devices that are typically used for handsfree communication use Bluetooth as its wireless technology. They still require a smartphone or other device to initiate a call. These devices include Bluetooth headsets, hands-free car kits (HFCK), and personal navigation devices (PND). Originally introduced as optional features connected by a wire to smartphones or other communication devices, they now generally are available with wireless technology.

Bluetooth handsfree options are now also easily found in any high end automotive as part of the vehicle's stereo system, or in after market stereo system units. This option utilizes the vehicle's speakers to transmit the caller's voice in the phone call and have an embedded microphone in the stereo unit itself, the steering wheel, or a separate wired microphone that can be placed anywhere in the vehicle.

== Mobile phones ==
Handsfree mobile phones are obligatory in many countries for use of a mobile phone while driving. However, studies have shown that even with a hands-free unit, the added distraction to the driver, and the increase in crash rates, are almost as substantial as when driving and talking on a normal mobile phone.

In the United Kingdom, as of 2003, it is illegal to use a handheld mobile phone while driving. Similar laws have been adopted in many jurisdictions worldwide, and many make provisions for hands-free phone use.

Installation of hands-free devices in the UK is governed by MPT 1362, which is now referred to as FCS 1362. A technical document created and updated by the Federation of Communication Services.

In Australia, all states have banned the use of a mobile phone while driving unless it is used with a handsfree headset.

== Software technologies ==
Since handsfree devices replace a phone's own speaker and microphone capability in a phone call, they now also must deal with the same issues that standard mobile phones and land phones deal with. The main acoustic issues are echo cancellation and noise suppression, although there are others as well. There have been many ways developed to cancel echo in phone calls and results range from poor to excellent.

These acoustic technologies must also remove or reduce the noise levels so that the caller is well understood. A person making a call from a handsfree device who is in a busy restaurant or while driving will introduce large levels of noise into the call. This situation is complicated as the software must not only remove the noise around him, but must transmit his voice clearly and loudly to whoever is connected to him.

Some software solutions combine both echo cancellation and noise cancellation into a single technology so that the caller has the freedom to use a handsfree device anywhere. Having an acoustic solution with only one feature could reduce its flexibility.

== Driving ==
Handsfree driving is when driving without the hands.

== See also ==
- Bluetooth
- Hands-free computing
- Smartglasses
