= MyLink =

Infotainment system by General Motors

MyLink a.k.a. Intellilink is a telematics system/infotainment system offered by General Motors in their vehicles. The system was debuted in 2011 in the then-new Chevrolet Volt.

The system was marketed as Intellilink for Buick, GMC, Vauxhall and Opel. It was marketed as MyLink by Chevrolet and Holden. Cadillac used the CUE infotainment system. The systems were manufactured by three companies for GM: Panasonic for most Intellilink/MyLink units, LG Electronics for the unit equipped on the Chevrolet Sonic, Chevrolet Spark, Chevrolet Trax and Vauxhall/Opel Adam, and Bosch for Cadillac's CUE system.

Intellilink runs on the QNX real-time operating system with the voice recognition software from Nuance. It allows users to control online services through apps, like Pandora Internet Radio or Stitcher Radio through voice commands or the touch-screen interface. The car is able to access online content via a smartphone with a 3G data connection connected through Bluetooth. Users are also able to control their phone wirelessly via the same interface. MyLink also integrates OnStar's services (Advanced Automatic Collision Notification, roadside assistance, vehicle diagnostics information, live advisors, and turn-by-turn navigation).

== Capabilities ==
MyLink supports images in .jpg, .bmp, .png, and .gif formats; video files in .avi, .mpg, .mp4, .divx, .xvid, or .wmv formats; song files in MP3, WMA, and AAC formats and playlists in M3U standard and extended, iTunes, PLS, WAX, ASX and RMP formats.

== Services ==
- Integration with driver's iOS, Android or Windows Phone mobile devices, allowing music on the device to be browsed and played from the built-in touch screen
- Integration with iOS, Android or Windows Phone smart phones via Bluetooth to allow hands-free phone conversations
- Pandora internet radio, which provides personalized radio stations based on a user's favorite artists, songs, or genres; purchase songs; and rate songs "up" or "down"
- Stitcher SmartRadio, which lets users build a personalized listening experience from thousands of audio choices
- Gracenote music identification, which provides artist names, music genre, and album art
- Hands-free control of infotainment and vehicle climate controls, powered by Nuance
- Flash-memory capability added to in-car USB connections, so users can bring their own media storage
- MyLink software upgrades that users can download online and transfer to the vehicle
- Backup camera display on certain types & model years
- Some functionality is being withheld based on vehicle style/trim level

Note that the supported features and services vary from model to model. For example, MyLink in the Chevrolet Sonic and Spark models does not support Gracenote (since those models have no CD player) or climate control. The screen size, trim and appearance vary from model to model as well.

Additional features have been announced by Chevrolet for delivery in calendar year 2013.

== Availability ==
Originally the MyLink systems were set to be available on select 2012 model year vehicles before the end of 2011, however that was pushed back until "Spring 2012".

=== Chevrolet MyLink ===
- 2012 Chevrolet Volt (CD full version)
- 2012 Chevrolet Equinox (CD enhanced version)
- 2013 Chevrolet Camaro (non CD full version)
- 2013 Chevrolet Malibu (CD full version)
- 2013 Chevrolet Onix - Brazil (non CD basic version)
- 2013 Chevrolet Spark (non CD basic version)
- 2013 Chevrolet Trax (non CD basic version)
- 2013 Chevrolet Cruze (enhanced version)
- 2013 Chevrolet Sonic (non CD basic version)
- 2013 Chevrolet Traverse (availability unknown)
- 2014 Chevrolet Caprice PPV (CD version but without Nav, XM, USB or AUX jack access, or OnStar)
- 2014 Chevrolet Impala (LT1/2 and LTZ1/2 trims)
- 2014 Chevrolet Camaro (non CD full version)
- 2014 Chevrolet Corvette (non CD full version)
- 2014 Chevrolet SS (CD full version)
- 2014 Chevrolet Silverado (non CD full version)
- 2014 Chevrolet Spark
- 2014 Chevrolet Trax (LTZ)
- 2015 Chevrolet Caprice PPV (CD version but without Nav, XM, USB or AUX jack access, or OnStar)
- 2015 Chevrolet Colorado
- 2015 Chevrolet Corvette (non CD full version)
- 2015 Chevrolet Spark
- 2015 Chevrolet Suburban (LT and LTZ trims; LS trims added to 2016 models)
- 2015 Chevrolet Tahoe (LT and LTZ trims; LS trims added to 2016 models)
- 2015 Chevrolet Trax (LT and LTZ trims; all trims in the USA)
- 2016 Chevrolet Caprice PPV (Limited version without CD, Nav, XM, USB or AUX jack access, or OnStar)
- 2016 Chevrolet Camaro
- 2016 Chevrolet Impala (LT1/2 and LTZ1/2 trims)
- 2016 Chevrolet Malibu (LS/LT and Premier trims)
- 2016 Chevrolet Silverado (1500/2500)
- 2016 Chevrolet Spark
- 2017 Chevrolet Caprice PPV (Limited version without CD, Nav, XM, USB or AUX jack access, or OnStar)
- 2017 Chevrolet Cruze
- 2017 Chevrolet Malibu (LS/LT and Premier trims
- 2017 Chevrolet Bolt

=== Holden MyLink ===
- 2012 Holden Barina CDX (non CD basic Version)
- 2013 Holden Cruze (CD enhanced version)
- 2013 Holden VF Commodore (DVD full version)
- 2013 Holden Malibu (CD & CDX versions)

=== Intellilink ===
==== Buick ====
- 2012 Buick Verano
- 2016-2019 Buick Cascada
- 2012 Buick LaCrosse
- 2012 Buick Regal
- 2013 Buick Lacrosse
- 2013 Buick Enclave

==== GMC ====
- 2013 GMC Terrain
- 2013 GMC Acadia
- 2014 GMC Sierra
- 2014 GMC Terrain
- 2015 GMC Canyon
- 2015 GMC Yukon/Yukon XL

==== Opel/Vauxhall ====
- 2013 Vauxhall/Opel Adam
- 2013 Vauxhall/Opel Mokka
- 2014 Vauxhall/Opel Insignia
- 2014 Vauxhall/Opel Astra
- 2014 Vauxhall/Opel Zafira Tourer
- 2014 Vauxhall/Opel Meriva
- 2015 Vauxhall/Opel Corsa
- 2016 Vauxhall Viva/Opel Karl

== MyLink Systems ==
-The MyLink 4.2 features an A/M-F/M radio, an auxiliary audio input jack, and a USB port, plus a 4.2" color display screen. OnStar is an available option. This system is only available on the Chevrolet Silverado W/T Work Truck models.

-The upgraded MyLink 4.2 adds a CD player with MP3 player and WMA support, plus Bluetooth with A2DP Stereo Audio Streaming capabilities. OnStar is an available option, as is Sirius XM Satellite Radio. This system is available on the Chevrolet Silverado, Chevrolet Impala, and Chevrolet Colorado models.

-The MyLink Apps features an A/M-F/M radio, an auxiliary audio input jack, a USB port, support for mobile apps, a full color touch screen display, OnStar, voice command capabilities that use the connected devices' voice command systems, OnStar, Siri Eyes-Free support, Bluetooth with A2DP Stereo Audio Streaming capabilities, mobile apps support, an SD card slot, Sirius XM Satellite Radio, and BringGo GPS navigation system support developed by EnGIS Technologies, Inc. This system is available on the Opel Adam, Chevrolet Spark, and Chevrolet Sonic models.

-The MyLink Color Touch features an A/M-F/M radio, an auxiliary audio input jack, a USB port, a full color touch screen display, voice command, Bluetooth with A2DP Stereo Audio Streaming capabilities, steering wheel-mounted audio system controls, Sirius XM Satellite Radio, OnStar, an SD card slot, and HDD for storing music onto the system. A CD player is an available option, and is standard with most MyLink Touch systems. This radio also works with mobile apps. The Chevrolet Caprice PPV received a stripped-down version of this radio for MY 14–15, with no Sirius XM, USB, Aux jack, or OnStar access. In MY 16-17 the Caprice PPV radios were further de-contented with the CD drives being eliminated, with no addition of replacement features.

-The MyLink Color Touch with Navigation adds a GPS navigation system to the MyLink Color Touch radio. On Chevrolet Camaro models equipped with this radio, the CD player option is not available.

-The MyLink Color Touch radios on Chevrolet Impala models and Chevrolet Malibu models slide out or slide up from the dashboard to reveal a hidden storage compartment for storing items such as MP3 players, cellular phones, and other devices and items behind the touch screen.

-The Mylink/IntelliLink Color Touch also features HD Radio as a standard on selected GM models in the United States. As of the 2015 model year (which began in August 2014), the Chevrolet Suburban/GMC Yukon XL & Denali XL, Chevrolet Tahoe/GMC Yukon & Denali, and the GMC Acadia are the only vehicles equipped with HD Radio as a standard on all trims. It had been featured as a standard on the Chevrolet Impala and Silverado/GMC Sierra and on the Chevrolet Traverse as an optional, and as a standard on the Buick Regal and Enclave for the 2014 model year, but were removed for the 2015 model year.

== See also ==
- Toyota Entune (USA)
- G-Book
- Hyundai Blue Link
- MyFord Touch
- Ford Sync
- Internavi
- CarWings
- Microsoft Auto
- Bluetooth
- OnStar
- Kia UVO
- BMW Assist
- Fiat Blue&Me
- MSN Direct
- Mercedes COMAND
- MirrorLink
