= G-Book =

Telematics subscription service

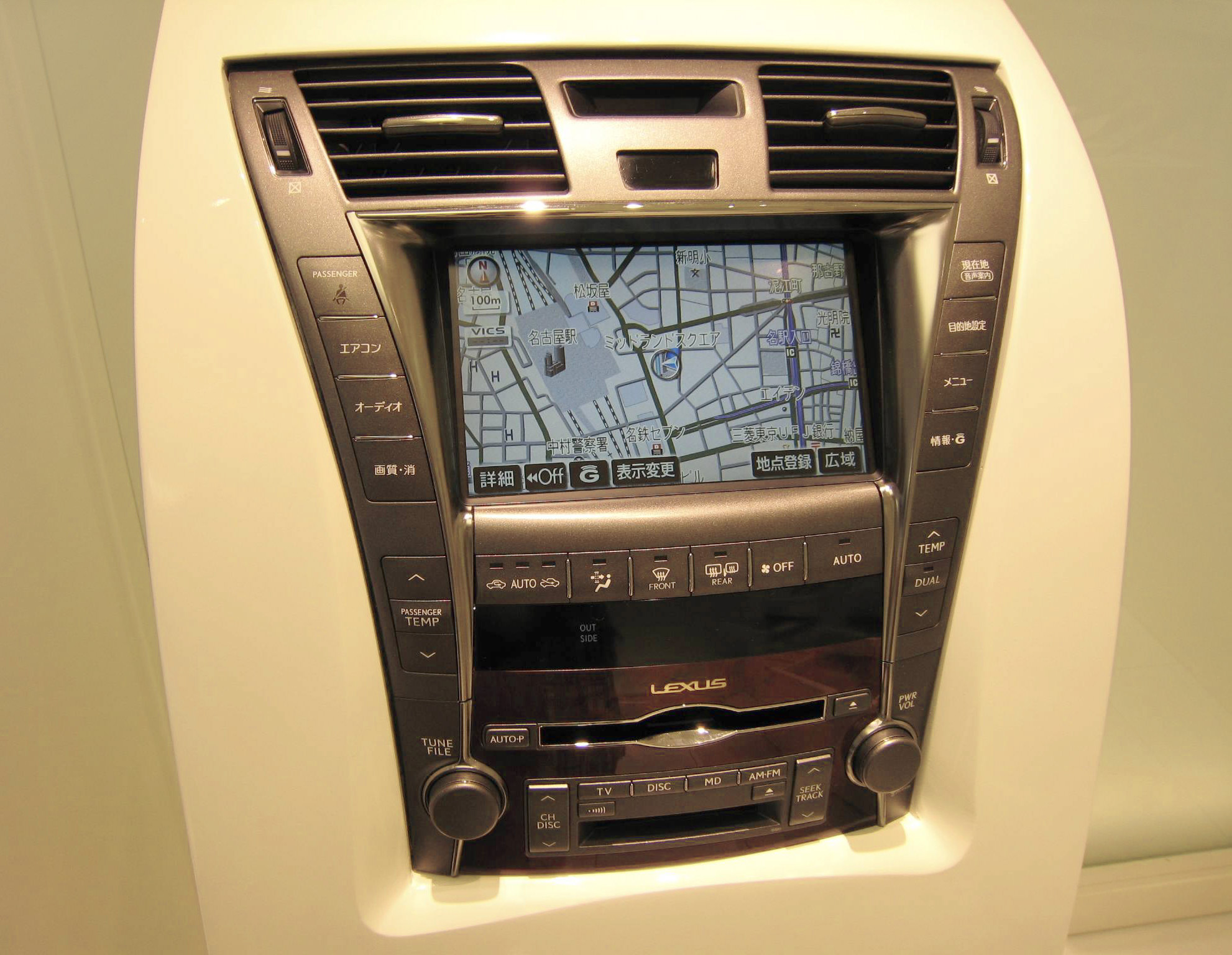
Lexus navigation system with G-Book/G-Link ('G'-icon button on touchscreen)

G-Book was a telematics subscription service provided by Toyota Motor Corporation in Japan for its Toyota- and Lexus-branded vehicles. G-Book allowed users to link with cellphones (such as the Toshiba T003 cellphone), personal digital assistants (PDAs), personal computers (PC) and G-Book equipped cars across Japan. It is based on the former GAZOO infrastructure (renamed Toyota Media Service Corporation) of Toyota's membership-based information service and membership system, and it provides interactive information services via vehicle installed touch-screen wireless communication terminals. It also incorporates information from Toyota Mapmaster Inc. which updates digital mapping information and is used by various international companies.

The subscription service replaced the need to periodically update in-car navigation systems that use CD, or DVD installed maps that must be updated with the latest information. The maps are sent by internet connections established through the driver's cellphone with a data download plan associated with the cellphone.

The G-Book application could be installed on select mobile devices, thereby providing the technology without having to purchase a vehicle installed with the technology.

A proprietary service with additional functions for the Lexus division, G-Link, debuted on Japan-market Lexus models starting in model year 2006. Toyota made available G-Book devices as optional equipment in all Japanese domestic market Toyota, Daihatsu and Lexus vehicles starting with model year 2007. An article posted by "Response.jp" stated in an article on July 15, 2009 that Toyota was introducing G-Book in a specially identified Toyota Camry to be sold in Beijing, China. As of November 2009 the G-Book-equipped Camry is available in Shanghai as well. G-Book was also introduced on Lexus models in China in 2009.

In Japan (T-Connect Japan), and in Middle East countries (Bahrain, Jordan, Kuwait, Lebanon, Oman, Qatar and UAE) T-Connect were offered as a download from Apple's AppStore and Google Play as a subscription telematics service, which uses the G-Book architecture.

G-Book services were discontinued on 31 March 2022.

== Technology ==
There were three versions of G-Book being offered; G-Book mX (and G-Book mX Pro), G-Book Alpha (and G-Book Alpha Pro) and G-Book.

Some of the services G-Book offered were a Safety and Security service, which aids in requesting a tow truck and vehicle location service, Live Navigation where an operator gives turn-by-turn directions, Information Service which provides news, weather forecasts and stock market information, Communication Service that offers the ability to send and receive web based e-mail, and post and read on message boards, E-commerce Service, that allows merchandise to be purchased from the GAZOO Shopping Mall, and a live operator is available through OSS (Operator Support Service) for various issues.

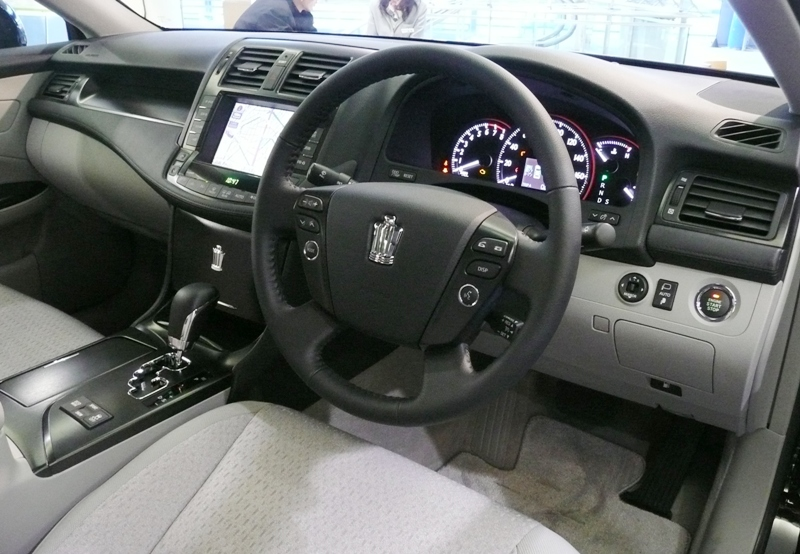
Interior of Japan-market Toyota Crown Athlete with G-Book touchscreen capability

One of the features offered exclusively on G-Book mX is Probe Communication Traffic Information. According to the press release from Toyota dated April 10, 2007, "This unique Toyota traffic information service gathers driving data – such as speed and position – from vehicles equipped with G-Book mX to provide drivers with alternate routes for avoiding traffic congestion. Because it makes use of the on-board DCM (data communications module), the information gathering capability of this service is superior to similar systems, which rely solely on cellphones, and efficiently stores information about traffic congestion in real time at the G-Book Center. In this way the Probe Communication Traffic Information service supplements Vehicle Information and Communication System (VICS) information with updates on traffic congestion, providing drivers with highly accurate predictions about the current traffic situation and suggestions for the best alternate routes to take." This feature was marketed as an ability to drive eco-friendly, by helping to avoid pollution created by cars idling in traffic and allowing the driver to reach their destination sooner, and affording the opportunity to turn the car off, limiting emissions being added to the atmosphere.

The wireless communications for Japan-market cars were handled by the DCM and transmits and receives information on the wireless network owned by Japanese telecommunications provider KDDI Corporation headquartered in Okinawa. The cellular platform used was the CDMA2000 1x (CDMA 1X) method, and it was possible to receive up to 144 kbit/s data. The same DCM is used for China-market models, thus the network provider for China-market G-Book services is China Telecom. Map updates and music downloads were not available for China-market G-Book-enabled cars, and traffic information is only available in Shanghai, Beijing, Guangzhou, and Shenzhen.

G-Book Alpha Pro, mX Pro DCM-only, and CDMA2000 1xEV-DO (CDMA 1X WIN) can send up to 2.4 Mbit/s of data, and the DCM supports hands-free calls. The DCM model is also equipped with its own GPS receiver and features, to track a stolen vehicle, and it also has an emergency notification ability to transmit the location of airbag deployment.

=== Secure Digital (SD) card-compatible terminal ===
According to a press release from Toyota dated 28 August 2002 "Navigational maps and the on-board terminal's basic software are stored in a Secure Digital (SD) card. The card can be inserted into "E-TOWER" terminals at convenience stores and other locations to download local or new maps or to upgrade the on-board terminal's basic software. Music and games can also be downloaded, and the SD card is compatible with commercially available audio players, digital cameras and PDAs that use SD cards, making it possible to share content such as music files, images and games." E-Tower locations can be found at numerous locations, including Circle K of Japan.

== G-Link ==
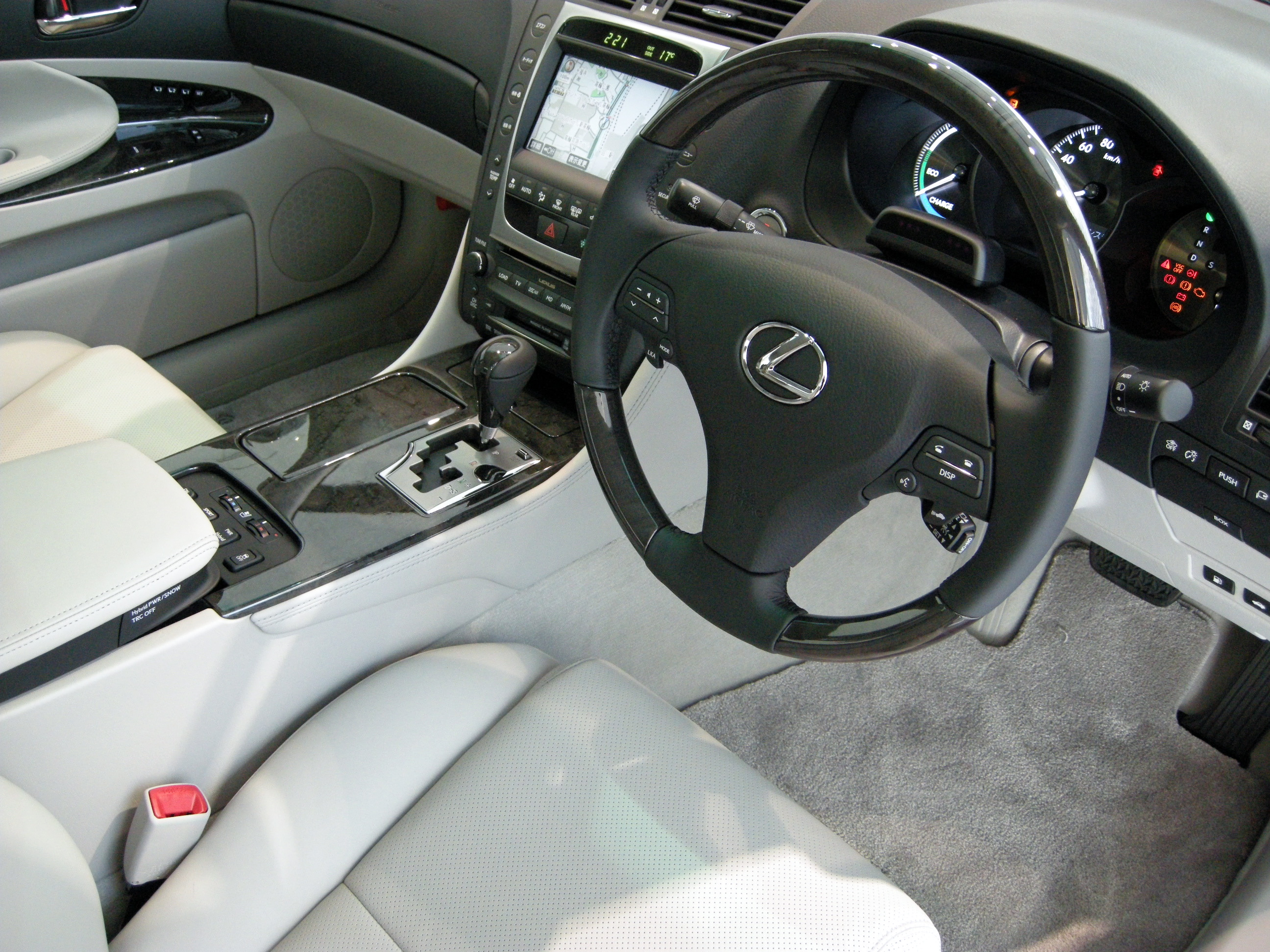
Japanese-market Lexus GS 450h with G-Link equipped touchscreen system.

Offered at Lexus' Japanese domestic market launch in 2005, G-Link is the proprietary Lexus telematics system for the Japanese market. G-Link had a different software configuration versus G-Book, particularly in its link to the 24-hour Lexus Owner's Desk hotline, and is offered standard for the first three years of ownership. Other aspects of the system at its 2005 launch were based on G-Book Alpha capabilities. The G-Link software runs off of the vehicle's hard disc drive navigation system and song library, and includes traffic updates, HelpNet compatibility, and the G-Security service. The G-Security service includes cellphone notification of vehicle lock and position status. A G-Sound music distribution service offers samples and downloading to the vehicle's hard disc drive of MP3s from different genres. A U.S. equivalent of the G-Link system with similar but not identical functionality, called Lexus Enform with Safety Connect, was launched in 2009.

In 2006, Japanese media reported that a Lexus-branded cellphone was also being produced with compatibility for the G-Link system. This cellphone service would be produced in conjunction with the KDDI telecommunications service provider, and is called "au", using Apple and Sony products.

== Related versions ==
Toyota has worked with other Japanese car manufacturers, such as Mitsubishi, Subaru and Daihatsu to provide the service in the Japanese language. Mazda had agreed to offer the service in Japan, with an intent to install the service starting with the 2005 model. Other similar services include: "Nissan Car Wings", and Internavi "Internavi Premium Club (Japanese)" by Honda. In the U.S., the Safety Connect system was produced based on the G-Book system architecture, with similar functionality, along with an expanded Lexus Enform service.

G-Book is similar to "W44T" offered in Japan by Toshiba, and "Pipit" in an agreement with Toyota and Willcom in Japan.

== See also ==
- (Japanese: Wikipedia article on PiPit)
- (Japanese: Wikipedia article on W44T)
- Bluetooth
- BMW Assist
- CarWings
- Fiat Blue&Me
- Ford Sync
- GM MyLink
- Hyundai Blue Link
- Internavi
- Kia Connect
- Mercedes COMAND APS
- Microsoft Auto
- MSN Direct
- MyFord Touch
- OnStar
- Toyota Entune (USA)
- Vehicle-to-vehicle
