= Internavi =

Automotive telematics service

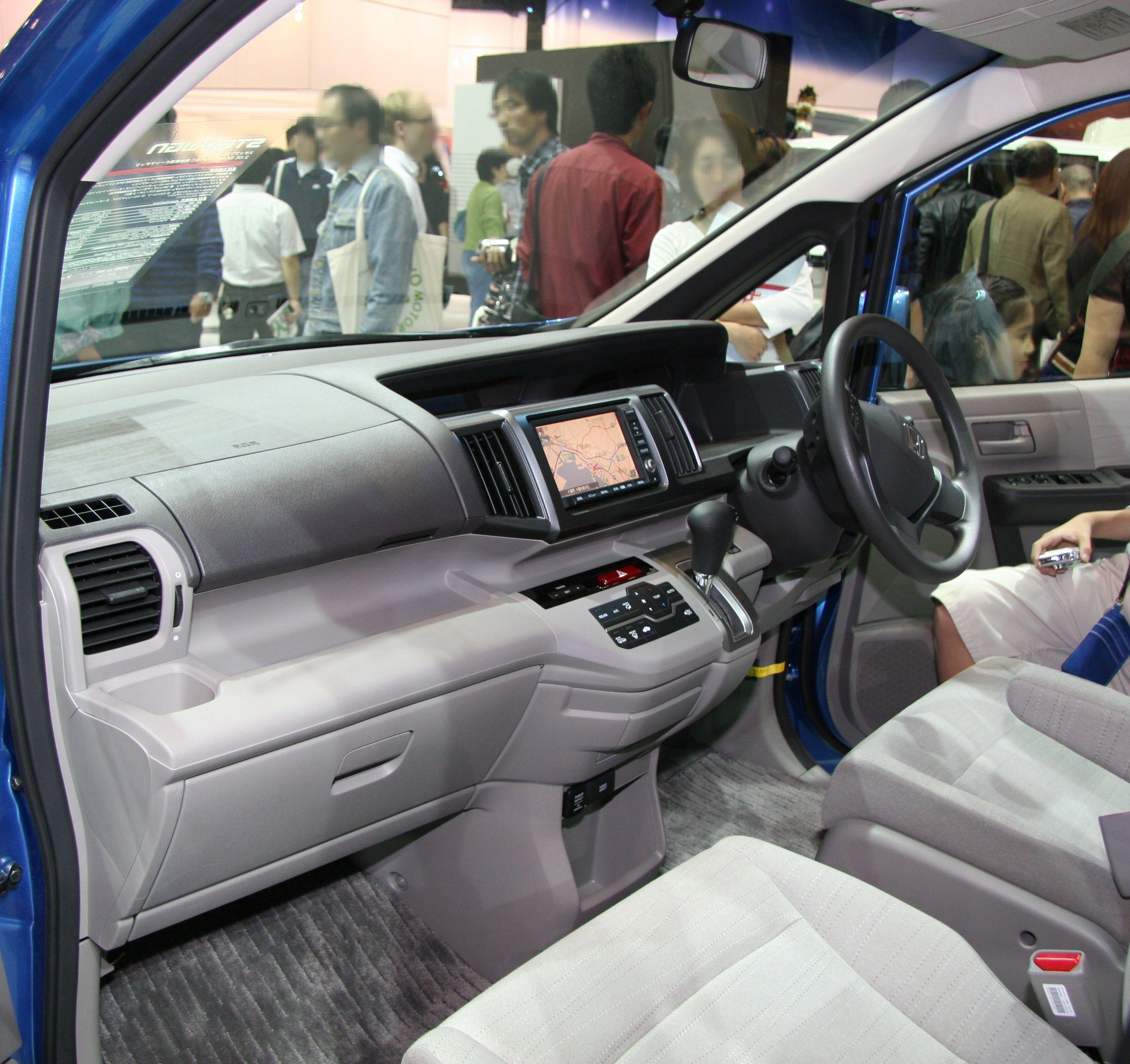
Honda Step WGN with "Internavi" displayed

Internavi is a vehicle telematics service offered by the Honda Motor Company to drivers in Japan. In the United States, the service is known as HondaLink, or sometimes MyLink. It provides mobile connectivity for on-demand traffic information services and internet provided maps displayed inside selected Honda vehicles. The service began August 1997 and was first offered in the 1998 Honda Accord and the Honda Torneo sold only in Japan starting July 1998. The service received a revision to services offered October 2002, adding traffic information delivery capabilities for subscribers to the Internavi Premium Club, and was optional on most Honda vehicles sold in Japan. VICS was integrated into the service starting September 2003. Membership in the service has steadily grown to exceed 5 million subscribers as of March 2007.

The subscription service replaces the need to periodically update in-car navigation systems that use CD, or DVD installed maps that must be updated with the latest information. The maps are sent by internet connections established through the drivers cellphone with a data download plan associated with the cellphone.

The service is available without having to purchase a Honda vehicle installed with the technology; The Internavi LINC is available at both the Apple App Store and Android Market and can be installed on compatible mobile devices.

One of the features offered is the ability to overlay weather information on the in-car map screen in 3D. Route guidance is provided in conjunction with VICS provided information so as to display a large weather disturbance approaching, such as a snow storm or typhoon, allowing drivers to take alternate routes.

== Internavi (with VICS) ==
The following is a description of the various elements that comprise Honda's "Internavi" information service, including integration of the Japanese governments nationally offered service VICS, or Vehicle Information and Communication System Press release for Internavi introduction

=== On-demand VICS ===
The technology is dependent on the user's cell phone service, and uses the data download plan associated with the users account. Once connected, one of the services available is route calculations towards a specific destination. The navigation technology interface connects to the server automatically at the Internavi Information Center, calculations and route planning is then determined towards establishing the quickest route towards the selected destination. The identified route also takes into consideration all currently known traffic and local transportation issues that may affect the plotted course from the VICS center, which is updated every five minutes based on reports from various sources. As travel begins towards the destination, any updated conditions are instantly relayed to the vehicle in real time. If cellphone service connection is lost, information will be updated as the connection is reestablished. Under normal navigation conditions, FM-multiplex broadcast VICS will prompt when specific conditions become aware, such as traffic congestion. The plotted course is then modified based on new information received to adjust travel time information, to include inter-city motorway links. Information received to vehicles installed with Internavi technology are installed with an antenna externally installed. Information is also transmitted by transmitter towers located throughout Japan, identified with a "Beacon Light" located on main urban roads. In this manner vehicles with Internavi receive information from both the "beacon light" towers and by individual cellphones paired up' with vehicles, providing highly accurate information in real time.

=== Internavi "floating car" system ===
As the vehicle travels, either on a planned destination or unguided autonomous driving, the vehicle installed with Internavi records the vehicle's GPS position and speed onto the vehicle's hard disk drive, and periodically updates to the Internavi Center Information Server. This autonomous information is then retransmitted towards other users, notifying of road conditions. Vehicles installed with previous internal maps utilizing a DVD are not given updated traffic conditions. Speed conditions are then displayed in three colors—red, orange and blue—to signify traffic congestion conditions, overlaid with updated VICS known conditions. This feature can be deactivated by the driver if position and speed of the individual vehicle does not want to be transmitted, however by doing so, road conditions can not be shared unless the tracking system is activated. Reports will then be limited to VICS information only. Road conditions can be specifically defined towards individual lane conditions, as opposed to general road conditions, such as to identify a traffic incident in a particular lane. As the information is stored by various contributing vehicles, congestion prediction can also be provided. Road conditions are transmitted by the VICS system, however, Internavi provides additional and more specific road and traffic conditions based on individual lane conditions provided by vehicles recording Internavi "floating car" conditions, specifying which lane and the direction of the road itself. Internavi supporting traffic information is transmitted by individual driver's cell phones, and if cellphone conditions are disrupted, the information is recorded onto the vehicles HDD, so that when cellphone reception is restored, all recorded information is then transmitted and updates are sent towards participating vehicles.

=== Parking selection function ===
Internavi participating vehicles also benefit from available parking spaces, whether it be on the street or in parking structures, public or private parking, from Internavi-equipped vehicles having made available a parking space. The space is also defined by the size of the leaving vehicle so that vehicles looking for a parking space can be reasonably confident the vacant space will accommodate the arriving vehicle.

=== Internavi Weather Features ===
As of October 2004, inclement weather conditions are overlaid onto the Internavi display map when the orientation of the map is displayed in 3D. This ability displays weather fronts as they approach the vehicles current position.

=== Information and CDDB music downloads ===
When playing a CD, the Internavi operating system provides the ability to save a particular song or the entire contents of the CD onto the hard disk within the vehicle. Information about the CD is then provided by Gracenote.

== Other Services ==
=== Map Update Service ===
The HDD map data is automatically updated for 24 months from registration, or up to 3 times map data on DVD sourced information before the first Japanese Government mandated vehicle inspection. After the time period has lapsed, map data updating is a supplementary service.

If the vehicle has been sent to Honda dealers for repair, the HDD map data is completely upgraded to the most current data available. Any music files stored in the HDD will be safeguarded to prevent accidental deletion.

=== Personal Home Page ===
The Member ID and password issued at the time of admission, which provides a personal home page in conjunction with the car navigation features. Key features, drive information, drive configuration spot, and notification of when maintenance is based on information sent from the car navigation system mileage. Users can plan ahead drive on a personal website, on a list that you have a destination, it is possible to easily perform the setting operation in the car destination. In addition, in June 2005 "Departure Time Traveller" is added a feature called, departure city, destination, and enter the desired arrival time, departure time and route recommendation, etc. To display the toll charges due.

=== QQ Calls ===
Internavi also offers a hands-free phone call service to call for assistance, such as an accident, or a road emergency. The service also provides a 24-hour roadside assistance service and vehicle towing service. The service is an additional ¥2,000 enrollment fee, plus an JAF enrollment with an annual fee ¥4,000 "Confederation of Japan Automobile". The service is three years complimentary for owners of the Honda Legend and the Honda Elysion with the V6 engine. This service also provides a live operator who can provide additional road assistance services in comparison to other points and to ensure alternative means of transportation and lodging expenses when it becomes impossible to continue driving.

=== Eco-Index ===
Honda's hybrid vehicles Honda Insight, the Honda CR-Z, and the Honda Fit Hybrid provide information such as Internet navigation information, and it records the accumulated mileage of the vehicle, which can be compared to other Hybrid owners vehicles and comparisons made towards other driver's habits.

== Membership System ==
When a Honda product with an Internavi compatible navigation system installed is purchased, the new owner can have the system activated by visiting any Japanese Honda dealership. The new owner then completes an application form to register the vehicle and pertinent information about the owner of the vehicle. Once completed, a PIN and activation instructions are sent to the owner.

== Compatible navigation systems ==
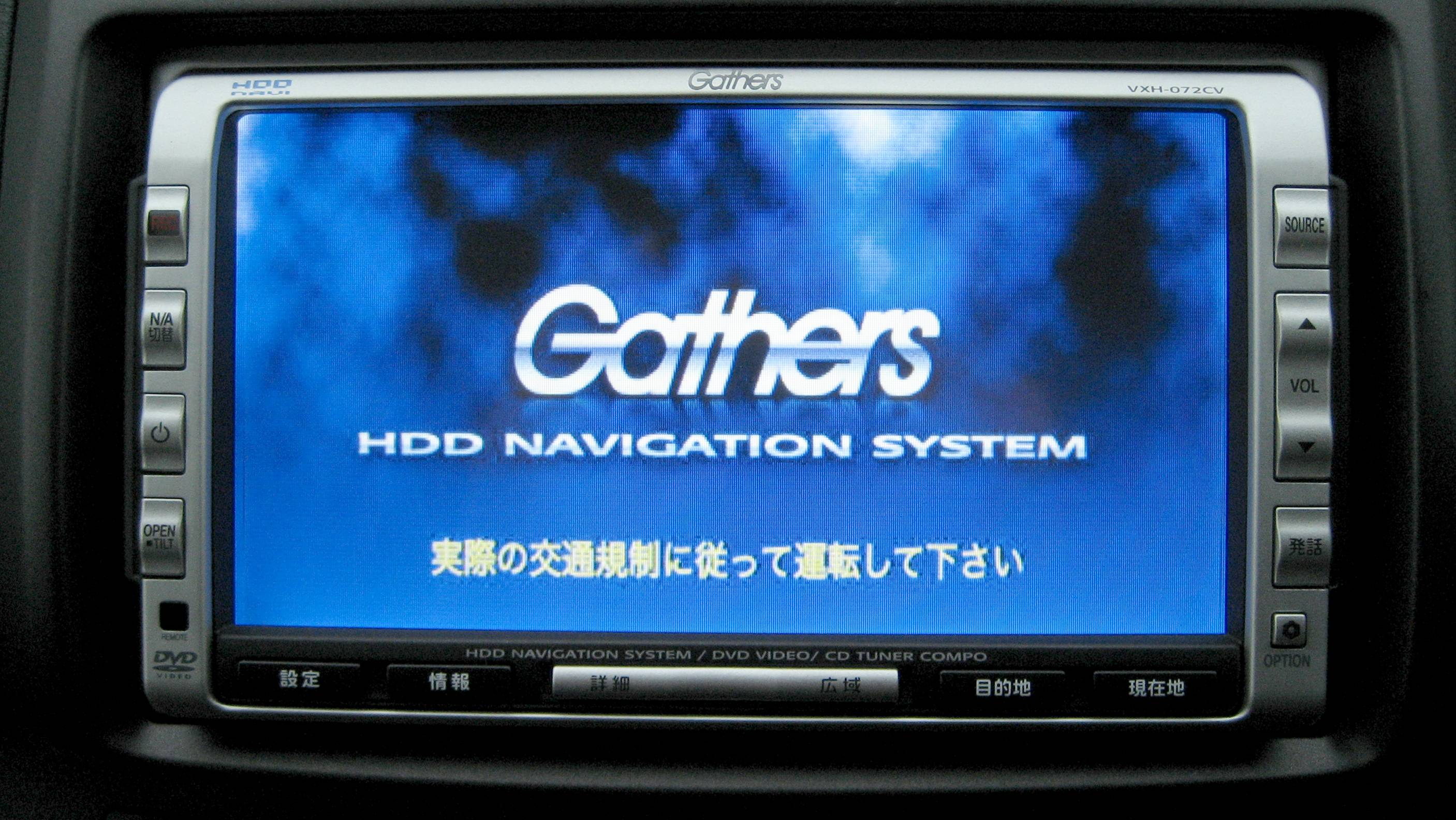
Gathers model VXH-072CV navigation unit

Older vehicles that were not sold with Internavi installed, but were compatible with the technology can be retrofitted with the system by visiting any Honda dealer, or by visiting "Honda Access" accessories retailers and have Internavi installed. In Japan, an automobile parts retail chain called "Autobacs" sells an in-dash navigation system built by Honda called "Gathers" that is compatible with the Internavi technology, and can install the equipment into any vehicle. Previous navigation technology that uses either DVD loaded maps or use a Hard Disk Drive may be compatible with Internavi. In addition, the DVD navigation system installed in the JDM Honda MDX can be upgraded and made compatible with Internavi. The JDM Honda Odyssey, Elysion, and the Honda Edix also have older versions of in-car navigation systems that can be upgraded. Pioneer "Carrozzeria" products are also found to be compatible.

== Compatible mobile phone ==
When Internavi was introduced, NTT DoCoMo's "mova" (Link to Docomo Glossary) and "au" phone, using CDMA 1X WIN technology was compatible. Phones that are identified with 3G technology can be paired with Internavi using a Bluetooth connection. In Japan, telecom company WILLCOM offers flat-rate telecommunications services, depending on the type of third generation mobile navigation what can be connected directly to telephone or cable for in home use on personal computers.

== Chronology ==
- August 1997 Internet fusing announced the first-generation Internet navigation services.
- July 1998 the Honda Accord, substantially revised the content service
- October 2002, plus traffic information delivery capabilities, "inter Premium Club" was released. By sharing the traffic information collected from the Inter-equipped vehicle
- September 2003, also provides information on normal roads VICS information not provided "Floating Car Data", and automobile manufacturers the world's first commercialized.
- June 2004 Achieved a membership of 100,000.
- October 2004 "Inter Navi Information by Lane" and "Inter Navi Weather" function was added.
- March 2005 Achieved a number of members 200,000.
- May 2005 WEB services for members in, with the VICS data InterNavi Advisor "departure time" began offering work.
- November 2005 Achieved a membership of 300,000. Willcom Card developed in collaboration with the straight-line communication service (launched in February 2006) announced. Reached 100 million km distance cumulative collection of information inter Floating Car
- March 2006, together with Google Earth use, publish information started floating car.
- July 2006 Achieved a membership of 400,000.
- November 2006 Corporate management support system utilizing safe driving Internavi "internaviBiz" (launched January 2007) announced.
- January 2007 Reached 200,000 km away Floating Car collect cumulative information inter .
- February 2, 2007 Introduced a flat-rate data communications service levels .
- March 2007 The number surpassed 500,000 members.
- July 2007 "Real-time map updates main street" announced the feature, the "Inter Navi Weather" to "heavy rainfall forecast information points" and "earthquake information" was added to the service. The purpose of such support measures to eliminate road congestion
- December 2007, announced to provide a floating car data Saitama.
- March 2008 "Time Traveller" starting capability, began to offer non-members.
- April 14, 2008, In collaboration with the police prefectures, to provide information on crime-ridden locations, such as automotive vehicle theft, and started with the website navigation system.
- August 2008 Pioneer Corporation granted access for "Floating Car Data" to use mutually announced to start within 2008 Floating Car Information and Internet access.
- December 2008 "Inter Navi Weather" to "road ice forecast information," added the service.
- July 2009 "Departure Time Traveller" and other information, has launched a mobile phone on.
- August 2009 "peak increment" and Zenrin Datacom in collaboration with the movement of the road to help in the event of a major earthquake, "Mobility Assistance Disaster Information Sharing System "Building the (start operating from September 01) announced that it has.
- October 2009 Traffic information service available for mobile phones even non-members in "Honda Drive controller shell" was started.
- December 2009 Topped the one million membership .
- February 2010 The automotive industry's first free communication cost "link up free" CR-Z, which began.
- March 2011, "Link-Up Free" for telecommunications equipment, Honda Fit Shuttle from Softbank of "Third generation mobile communication system (3G) to change the system announced it.
- November 2011 "Earthquake East Notification" in providing data for this service, worked as a transportation support activities in the affected areas, "Actual traffic information map" Fiscal 2011 "Good Design Award" to. The Good Design Grand Prize to the Honda Civic, which last won the award in 1984 in the three-door hatchback category.

== See also ==
- MyFord Touch
- Ford Sync
- Microsoft Auto
- Bluetooth
- OnStar
- Hyundai Blue Link
- Kia UVO
- Toyota G-Book
- Nissan's CarWings
- BMW Assist
- Fiat Blue&Me
- MSN Direct
- Mercedes COMAND
