= CarWings =

Vehicle telematics service

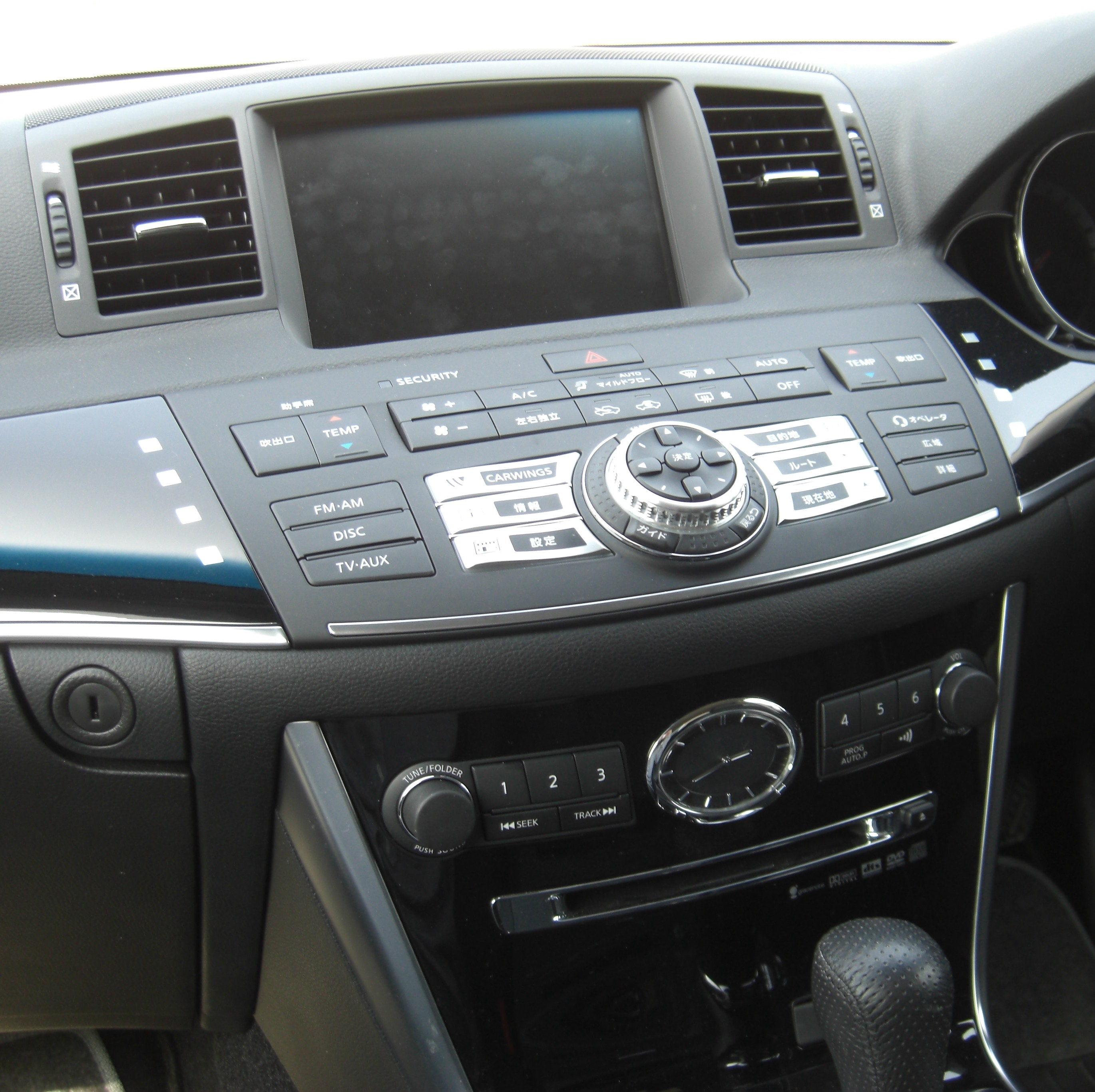
Nissan CarWings

CarWings, renamed NissanConnect in 2015, and also branded as Infiniti InTouch is a vehicle telematics service offered by the Nissan Motor Company to drivers in Japan, the United States, Canada, Great Britain, and most other countries. It provides mobile connectivity for on-demand traffic information services and internet provided maps displayed inside select Nissan vehicles. The service began in December 1997, and was introduced with the name Compass Link, having been installed in the 1997 Nissan Cedric, Nissan Gloria, Nissan President, Nissan Cima, Nissan Laurel, Nissan Leopard and the Nissan Elgrand. Compass Link was a service provided by Compass Link Co., Ltd. which was also offered to Mitsubishi and BMW vehicles in Japan beginning January 2000.

The subscription service replaces the need to periodically update in-car navigation systems that use CD, or DVD installed maps that must be updated with the latest information. The maps are sent by internet connections established through the vehicles TCU (telematics control unit), unlike other Nissan vehicles that use the driver's cell phone to connect to their data services.

== Vehicles installed with the service ==
Starting October 2006

- Presage
- Skyline
- Stagea
- Sylphy
- Teana
- Wingroad
- Murano
- Serena
- Lafesta
- Note
- Fuga
- Tiida
- Latio
- Leaf
- Elgrand
- Dualis

== Services Offered ==
The services offered vary on the version of the navigation system installed in the vehicle.

=== Fastest route (on-demand VICS) ===
This feature offers the most efficient route based on various conditions between the point of departure and the destination. The objective of this feature is to offer a predetermined route that will enable the driver to arrive with the fewest interruptions, taking into account any factors that could contribute to a delay in arriving in the least amount of driving time. The VICS (Vehicle Information and Communication System) feature is a service offered only in Japan that provides traffic information and is broadcast digitally on FM radio frequencies.

=== Operator Services ===
By selecting this feature, the system will connect you to a call center, where a destination can be sent to your vehicle by an operator, which can be done while the vehicle is moving. Other information available includes current weather information, a search for restaurants as well as other features. If the caller is unsure of some of the details needed, the live operator can make suggestions or offer assistance in numerous categories.

=== AutoDJ (information content) ===
Some of the services available include traffic and weather information, horoscopes, including sports scores and game status. The information is then displayed on the screen. The downloaded text, and navigation can be read audibly by the navigation system. Starting September 20, 2006, CARWINGS was made available to subscribers on their home computers, by registering the URL of a site that offers RSS, which is then relayed to a separate "information channel" that is also displayed.

=== Probe traffic information delivery ===
Installed in conjunction with HDD navigation, this service began in November 2006. The telemetry is uploaded via mobile phones, and the Nissan Vehicle Information Center collects and analyzes statistical system to deliver results as traffic information. The vehicles position is then complemented by the VICS service to display the fastest route. The implementation is very similar to the "Floating car" system offered by Honda's Internavi service. As of June 2007, the vehicles listed below were offered this particular service.

- Skyline, Serena, Tiida, Tiida Latio, Wingroad, Dualis

=== This city guide ===
Installed in HDD navigation, and Service began in November 2006. This service offers entertainment, shopping and leisure activities available relative to the current vehicles position and is downloaded automatically. It offers voice suggestions and directions to various locations.

=== Random Play ===
Installed in HDD navigation, and Service began in November 2006. Provide location and time automatically according to the above services listed.

== Price ==
When a new car is purchased at Japanese Nissan dealers, the navigation service is optional, registration for the service was free for three years from April 2008 operator services are free. After the free period ends, the service is available for ¥ 3,150 per year. The data connection subscription is an additional fee, provided by mobile phone communication services from telecom company WILLCOM subscription service "dedicated service for CARWINGS Navigation System". Softbank in 2010 since January, and flat-rate only communicate with the car navigation system at 210 yen per month to charge regular packets "Navigation Plan".

== Supported vehicles ==
Most of the Nissan vehicles (excluding commercial vehicles, some trucks) manufacturers standard or available in the navigation support options that are set by dealers. However, the feature can be used by different types of cars and navigation. Also, Suzuki for certain models (Grand Vitara etc.) have also been adopted.

Since September 2008, Sanyo navigation system also added support in some models of their "Gorilla" product line.

In March 2026 Nissan was criticized for its announcement that from March 30, 2026 support for NissanConnect would end for the Nissan Leaf made before May 2019 and for the e-NV200 van that was produced until 2022.

== Chronology ==
- December 1997 - Telematics service provider "Compass Link Co., Ltd." was established
- September 1998 - telematics services provided by operators, "Compass Link" launched
- July 1999 - No Information Service "Auto Compass Link" service start
- January 2000 - Compass Link Service Mitsubishi provided for the start
- July 2000 - BMW JAPAN link service as a compass for the "BMW Asist mobility support" start service.
- February 2002 - Leveraging the experience and expertise in linking compass, the nation's first comprehensive telematics services "CARWINGS (Wings Car)" was released
- February 2002 - Corporation TBS Radio & Communications in collaboration with the "Car Wings" on-demand start joint experiments utilizing radio
- April 2003 - Japan Railway Co. "Automotive Engineering" New Technology of the Year award for 2002-2003
- September 2004 - the fastest route search function, Bluetooth released a new CARWINGS navigation with wireless communications
- October 2004 - or 24-hour operator service CARWINGS, free for three years in the service fee structure to suit
- October 2004 - NTT DoCoMo as a joint review services, and new information services, "Mobile and Send" Start
- May 2005 - Sites that offer car Wings Plan "drive" the world's first commercial route search function using statistical traffic information
- October 2005 - membership and community sites "Car Wings Style" begins (ended November 20, 2006)
- October 2005 - sponsored by Shogakukan "Grand Serai" Award winning service planning
- November 2006 - Launch of the HDD navigation type (probe traffic information distribution service started)
- January 23, 2008 - Willcom, but only began selling communication unit. This is achieved by a fixed amount of communication and service operators
- April 1, 2008 - or all services other than operator services for free (only for new car registration)
- September 19, 2008 - Sanyo made portable navigation NV-BD600DT (nickname: Gorilla) installed
- September 29, 2015 - CARWINGS is merged into the NissanConnect EV system
- February 2016 - The NissanConnect EV mobile app is disabled in response to the discovery of an exploit that could allow a hacker to remotely control certain non-critical systems such as climate control

== See also ==
- MyFord Touch
- Ford Sync
- Microsoft Auto
- Bluetooth
- OnStar
- Hyundai Blue Link
- Kia UVO
- Toyota Entune (North America)
- Toyota G-Book (Japan)
- Honda's Internavi
- BMW Assist
- Fiat Blue&Me
- MSN Direct
- Mercedes COMAND
- OVMS
