= Ford Sync =

In-vehicle communications and entertainment system

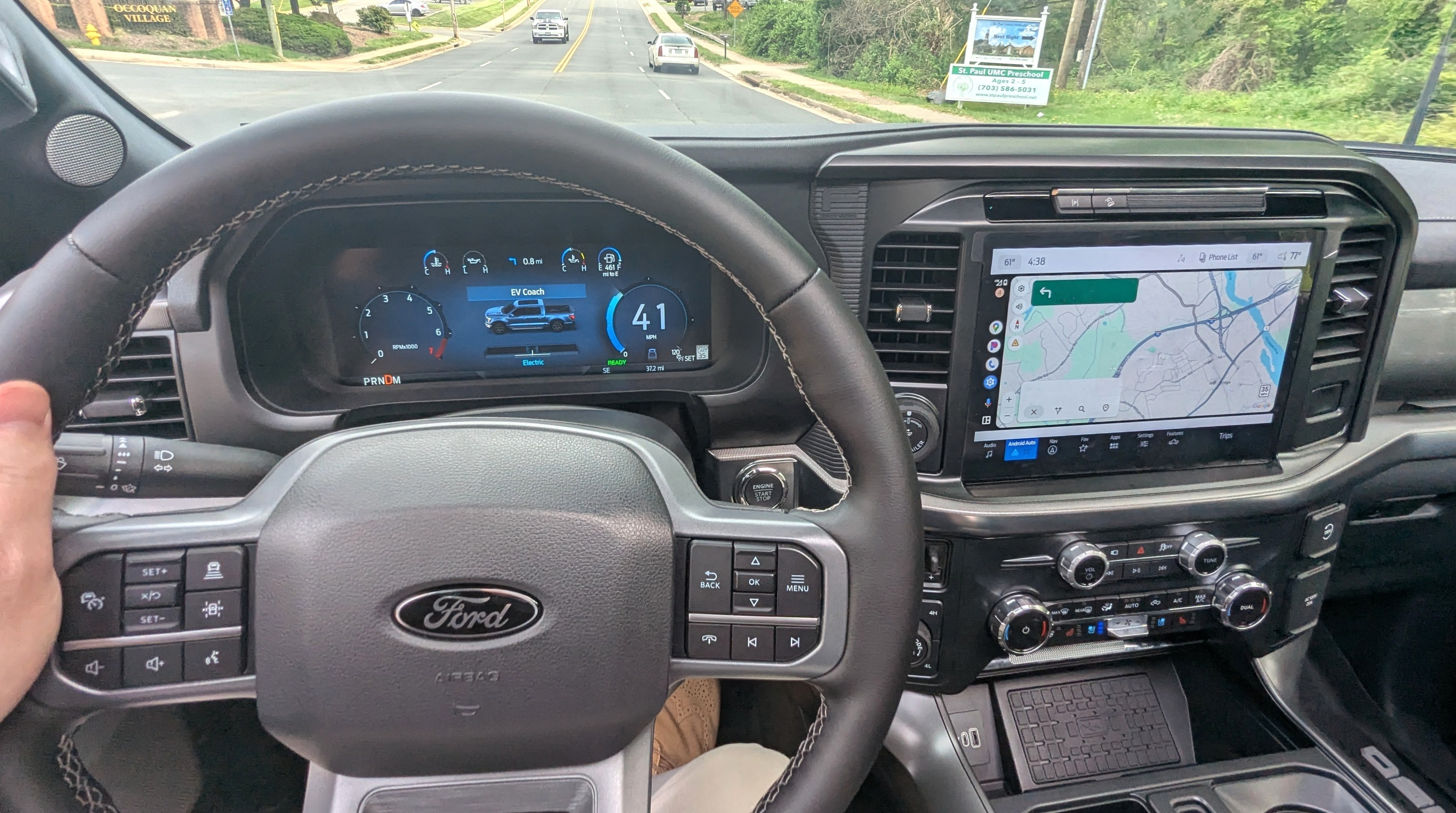
- Sync 4 on a 2025 F-150
- Original author: Ford Motor Company
- Developer: Ford Motor Company
- Release: September 2007
- Stable release: Gen 5 Gen 4/4a Gen 3 - 3.4.26057; Gen 2 - 3.10; Gen 1 - 5.11
- Operating system: Windows Embedded Automotive; QNX
- Available in: English, Dutch, French, Spanish, Portuguese
- Type: Telematics
- License: Proprietary commercial software
- Website: www.ford.com/technology/sync/

Ford Sync (stylized Ford SYNC) is a factory-installed, integrated in-vehicle communications and entertainment system that allows users to make hands-free telephone calls, control music and perform other functions with the use of voice commands. The system consists of applications and user interfaces developed by Ford and other third-party developers. The first two generations (Ford Sync and MyFord Touch) run on the Windows Embedded Automotive operating system designed by Microsoft, while the third and fourth generations (Sync 3 and Sync 4/4a) run on the QNX operating system from BlackBerry Limited, and Sync 5 runs on Android Automotive OS.

Ford first announced the release of SYNC in January 2007 at the North American International Auto Show in Detroit. SYNC was released into the retail market in 2007 when Ford installed the technology in twelve Ford group vehicles (2008 model) in North America.

== Overview ==
Ford president and CEO Alan Mulally and Microsoft chairman Bill Gates announced the SYNC partnership between Ford and Microsoft at the annual North American International Auto Show in January 2007.

The Ford SYNC technology was promoted as a new product that provided drivers with the ability to operate Bluetooth-enabled mobile phones and digital media players in their vehicles using voice commands, the vehicle's steering wheel, and radio controls. Later, new technology was added to SYNC in which text messages received by the driver are "vocalized" by a digitized female voice device named "Samantha". SYNC's text message function also has the ability to interpret approximately one hundred shorthand messages, such as "LOL", and will read "swear words", but does not decipher acronyms that have been considered by the designers to be "obscene".

In 2007, as a standalone option, the suggested retail price for the SYNC was US$395.

== Compatibility ==
Certain voice commands, such as "Turn-by-turn directions", "Vehicle Health Report", "Weather" and climate control commands are not available in some countries such as Canada due to compatibility issues. For example, many commands are not available because there is no French equivalent for a command in English. Ford Canada expects to address these issues in upcoming versions of the software after the issues are worked out in detail, but there does not appear to be a firm release date.

=== Mobile-integration ===
SYNC has various mobile-integration capabilities, including "Push to Talk" on the steering wheel, wireless transfer of contacts between a mobile phone and the on-board phone book, as well as various advanced calling features, such as caller ID, call waiting, conference calling, a caller log, a list of contacts, a signal strength icon, and a phone battery charge icon. Personal ring tones can also be assigned to identify specific callers.

==== Audible SMS messages ====
SYNC can convert a user's SMS messages to audio and read them out loud to the user through the vehicle's speaker system. This feature is carrier dependent as well as dependent on the device of the user. The feature is supported by several phone operating systems, including the iPhone, most Android models, and Windows Mobile. This feature is also dependent on the phone supporting Bluetooth Message Access Profile.

=== Entertainment ===
==== Digital music player support ====
SYNC can connect to popular digital music players via Bluetooth or a USB connection. Users can browse through music collections by genre, album, artist, and song title using voice commands. With certain devices, SYNC is also capable of playing protected content (for example Zune Pass downloads), provided that usage rights on the device are current.

== Applications ==
=== 911 Assist / Emergency Assistance ===
The 911 Assist application places a direct call to a local 911 emergency operator in the event of a serious accident with an airbag deployment. Before initiating the emergency 911 call, SYNC will provide a 10-second window to allow the driver or passenger to decide whether to cancel the call. If not manually cancelled within the 10-second window, SYNC will place the emergency call. A pre-recorded message will play when the call is answered, and occupants in the vehicle will then be able to communicate directly with the 911 operator.

In Europe, this feature is called Emergency Assistance. It will call 112 in over 40 countries. Though in Albania, Belarus, Bosnia & Herzegovina, North Macedonia, Moldova, the Netherlands, Russia, Ukraine it does not work and in Belgium there is a chance that the 112 emergency center cannot process the GPS coordinates since it is not compatible with the European eCall standard.

=== AppLink ===
AppLink allows iPhone and Android-based cellular devices to run approved applications using the car's buttons or voice commands.

The first set of announced applications for the U.S. included Pandora Radio, Stitcher Radio, iHeartRadio, OpenBeak, NPR News, Slacker Radio, TuneIn Radio and Ford SYNC Destinations. Rhapsody announced AppLink capability of its Android-based mobile app in January 2013. Spotify was made available to iPhone users in March 2013 and later to Android users too, but discontinued in January 2018.

Applications for the U.K. market (as of September 2019) are Glympse (real-time location sharing), Waze (navigation), Sygic (navigation), Radioplayer, EventSeeker, CitySeeker, HearMeOut, AccuWeather and Acast.

Applications for the Spain market (as of June 2021) are Ayuntamiento de Alcobendas City App (send curated notifications from the City Authorities to nearby Drivers about street conditions and driver-safety issues such as accidents, street closures, diversions, social traffic events and more.)

=== Traffic, Directions and Information ===
Traffic, Directions and Information is an application that provides the user with traffic alerts, turn-by-turn directions and information about topics such as weather, sports, news and 411 business search. Ford announced on May 27, 2009, that the Traffic, Directions and Information application would be free for three years to the original owner of 2010 model year SYNC-equipped vehicles. The information for traffic alerts and Turn-By-Turn Directions are provided by INRIX and Telenav.

=== Vehicle Health Reports ===
Ford has discontinued support for the Vehicle Health Report. According to the published service bulletin, "Ford has made the necessary decision to discontinue the Vehicle Health Report service for SYNC GEN1 & GEN2 available on 2008-2016 vehicles. Consistent with the Terms & Conditions in the user agreement and starting August 1st, 2018, this change will result in the following:

Vehicle Health Information will no longer be sent through the mobile phone associated with the registered e-mail account Vehicle Health Reports will no longer be sent via e-mail Vehicle Health Reports will no longer be available on the Ford/Lincoln Owner websites"

=== Ford Work Solutions ===
The Ford Work Solution is a collection of technologies debuted in April 2009. Ford Work Solutions is marketed toward professionals who buy the Ford F150, F-Series Super Duty, E-Series van and Transit Connect. Magneti Marelli developed the in-dash computer system that is unique to trucks equipped with Ford Work Solutions. The applications included in the Ford Work Solution are Crew Chief, Garmin Nav, Mobile Office and Tool Link.

==== Crew Chief ====
The Crew Chief application provides real-time vehicle location and maintenance tracking. Crew Chief can monitor numerous vehicle diagnostic functions including tire pressure, water in fuel, airbag faults and the check engine light. Users can also create alerts to monitor things such as excessive speeding.

==== Garmin Navigation ====
The Garmin Navigation application provides capabilities including destination routing and locating points of interest.

==== LogMeIn ====
The LogMeIn application allows users to remotely access an office computer using a data connection provided by Sprint. The user can open applications on the remote computer, make updates and print documents using a Ford-certified, Bluetooth-enabled keyboard and printer.

==== Tool Link ====
Tool Link is an application that enables a user to take physical inventory of objects present in the truck bed using radio-frequency identification (RFID) tags. A user attaches RFID tags to an object, allowing the SYNC system to detect the object's presence or absence and noting the object's status on the in-dash computer display.

Users can create "job lists" of objects to verify that tools needed for a certain job are present in the truck before heading to a job site. At the end of the job, the system can inventory items in the truck to ensure that no tools are left on the job site. Ford developed the Tool Link application with power tool manufacturer DeWalt along with ThingMagic.

== Agreement with Microsoft ==
Ford had exclusive use of the Microsoft Auto embedded operating system that powered the early versions of SYNC until the exclusivity agreement expired in November 2008. The Ford-developed user interface elements and Ford-developed applications remain exclusive to Ford group vehicles and are not available to other manufacturers using Windows Embedded Automotive for the basis of their in-vehicle infotainment systems.

== SYNC versions ==
The original SYNC system (before the introduction of MyFord Touch) is now known as "SYNC Gen1", while the new MyFord Touch and MyLincoln Touch systems are known as "Gen2".

=== SYNC Gen1, Sept. 2007-Nov. 2012 ===
SYNC v1, which debuted September 2007, offered the ability to play certain entertainment media, the ability to connect to certain mobile phones and digital audio players and to utilize SMS. In January 2008, SYNC v2 was released, which enabled two new Ford developed applications: 911 Assist and Vehicle Health Report. SYNC v3, released in April 2009, enabled the Traffic, Directions and Information application. Later that month, Ford Work Solutions, a collection of five applications marketed towards professionals who buy Ford trucks, was added. The applications included in the Ford Work Solution were Crew Chief, Garmin Nav, LogMeIn and Tool Link. SYNC v4 and v5 were released in January 2010 and January 2011, respectively, and enabled the Ford-developed MyFord Touch application for certain 2011 model year vehicles as well as SYNC AppLink capabilities for certain 2011 model year vehicles. The latest version of SYNC was released in November 2012 by Ford and is only applicable to certain vehicles and configurations.

Ford has extended the warranty for Sync on several 2011 to 2014 models to five years as a customer satisfaction matter. (Field Service Action Number: 12M02)

=== Sync 3 ===
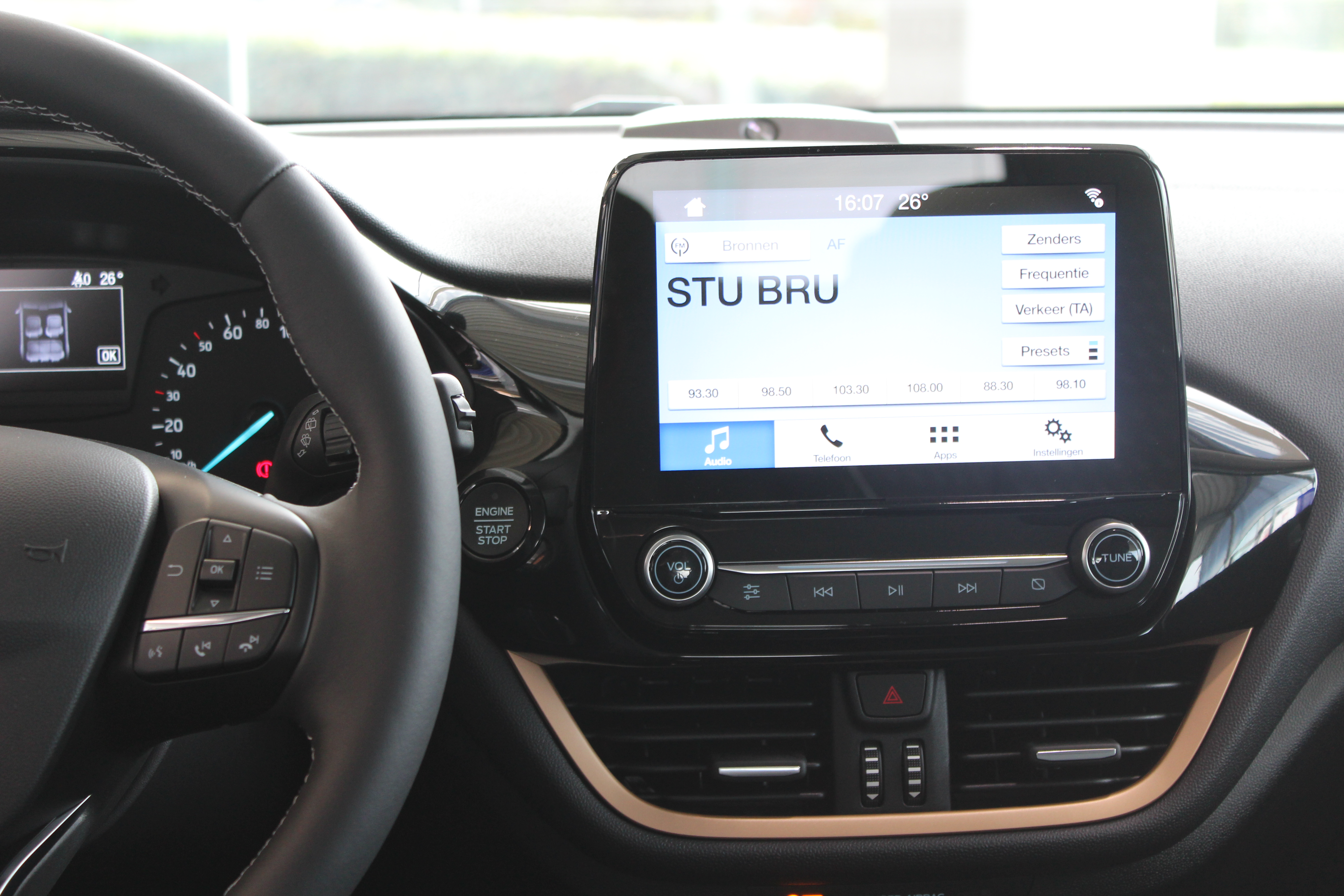
The Sync 3 on a Ford Fiesta

On December 11, 2014, Ford announced Sync 3, which replaced MyFord Touch, having simpler features and be powered by QNX software by BlackBerry Limited instead of Microsoft. The Sync 3 name is used for both Ford and Lincoln models, though Lincoln's have a different theme. Over half of Ford's North American vehicles were planned to have Sync 3 by the end of 2015 and be expanded globally afterward; vehicles not equipped with Sync 3 were equipped with the original Ford Sync. Ford cited issues with Microsoft's complex software dragging down its scores with Consumer Reports and other consumer magazines being a reason it switched to the BlackBerry QNX operating system.

=== Sync 4 and 4a ===
On October 30, 2019, Ford announced Sync 4 and 4a, the next version of their infotainment platform. The new platform was initially announced with the unveiling of the Ford Mustang Mach E on November 18, 2019. The first production vehicle and further details of Sync 4 were released at the unveiling of the 2021 model year Ford Mustang Mach-E. Sync 4 comes with an 8 or 12 inch horizontally oriented main display while Sync 4a comes with a 12 or 15.5 inch vertically oriented main display. Ford Power-Up software updates deliver continuous vehicle enhancements via over-the-air updates.

=== SYNC Phase 5 (Digital Experience) ===
In March 2023, the SYNC 5 infotainment system was launched alongside the redesigned Lincoln Nautilus, running Android Automotive OS and DuerOS in China. In the second half of 2024, the 2025 Lincoln Navigator, Lincoln Aviator, and Ford Expedition were equipped with the SYNC 5 system.

== System hardware ==
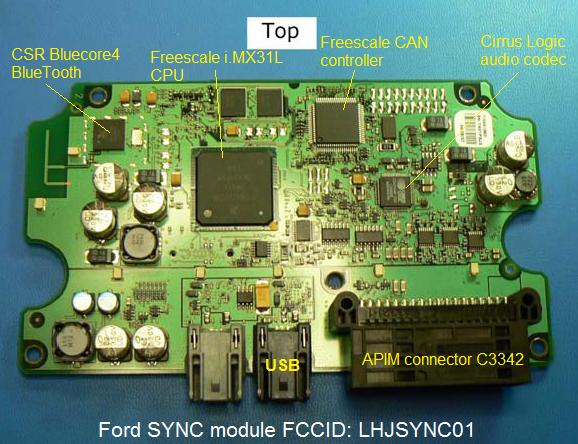
Ford SYNC module circuit board FCCID LHJSYNC01

The SYNC v1 computer, which Ford calls the Accessory Protocol Interface Module (APIM), is housed separately from the head unit, called the Audio Control Module (ACM), and interfaces with all vehicle audio sources as well as the high-speed and medium-speed vehicle CAN-buses. The first generation of the Ford's SYNC computer was designed in cooperation with Continental AG and is built around a 400 MHz Freescale i.MX31L processor with an ARM 11 CPU core, uses 256 MB of 133 MHz Mobile DDR SDRAM from Micron and 2 GB of Samsung NAND flash memory, runs the Windows Embedded Automotive operating system, and uses speech technology by Nuance Communications. Utilizing the USB port, SYNC's Microsoft Windows Auto-based operating system can be updated to work with new personal electronic devices. A Cambridge Silicon Radio (CSR) BlueCore4 chip provides Bluetooth connectivity with compatible phones and devices. SYNC's major circuit board chips cost roughly US$27.80, which allows Ford to profitably sell the system at a much lower price than competitive offerings.

SYNC 3 hardware is a TI OMAP5432 CPU, using ARM Cortex-A15 cores.

SYNC 4 hardware is an NXP i.MX 8 Series, using ARM Cortex-A53 cores.

The SYNC 5 infotainment system installed in the Lincoln Nautilus is powered by the Qualcomm Snapdragon 8155 processor, integrated with 16GB of RAM and 256GB of internal storage. It also supports high-speed 5G network connectivity, enabling enhanced data transmission and real-time online services. It is typically configured with one or two 23-inch curved digital instrument displays, complemented by an 11.1-inch central touchscreen for infotainment and vehicle controls.

== Research ==
In 2011, Shutko and Tijerina reviewed large naturalistic studies on cars (Dingus and Klauer, 2008; Klauer et al., 2006; Young and Schreiner, 2009), heavy good vehicles (Olsen at el, 2008) and commercial vehicles and buses (Hickman et al., 2010) in field operational tests (Sayer et al., 2005, 2007). They concluded that:

- Driver inattention is a contributory factor in most collisions/near-misses;
- Visual inattention – looking away from the road – is the single most significant type of inattention;
- Distraction from listening to or talking on a handheld/hands-free devices is less of a contributory factor in collisions/near-misses than is generally thought; indeed, these distractions may enhance safety in some circumstances.

== Awards and recognition ==
- Popular Mechanics ranked SYNC number four on its list of the "Top 10 Most Brilliant Gadgets of 2007".
- Popular Science magazine awarded SYNC a "Best of What's New Award" for 2008 in November 2007.

== Remote Emergency Satellite Cellular Unit (RESCU) ==
Both Ford Motor Company and General Motors announced then-advanced services in 1996 for their top-of-the-line automobiles that provided GPS-assisted vehicle security and wireless communication. Ford delivered its RESCU (Remote Emergency Satellite Cellular Unit) service on the 1996 Lincoln Continental before GM delivered its OnStar, "a similar system" on some model-year 1997 vehicles.

In less than five years, a book said that "potential competitors for OnStar are lagging" and that "Ford's RESCU has fizzled.

A 2018 look-back at 1997 described Ford's RESCU as "long gone" and added that "Ford now has SYNC, which is a much more robust and flexible system."

== See also ==
- Android Auto
- Blue&Me
- Bluetooth
- BMW Assist
- CarPlay
- CarWings
- Hyundai Blue Link
- iLane
- Internavi
- Kia UVO
- MSN Direct
- MyFord Touch
- OnStar
- Toyota Entune
- Toyota G-Book
- Windows Embedded Automotive

== Bibliography ==
- Moran, Tim (2007-01-08). "Out of Sync". The New York Times. Archived from the original on 2011-08-30. "Ford's announcement on Sunday of its relationship with Microsoft..."
- Nunez, Alex (2007-01-07). "Detroit Auto Show: Ford Sync". autoblog.com. AOL Inc. Archived from the original on 2011-02-08. "Sync is fluent in English, French and Spanish."
- Tutor, Chris (2009-09-17). "REPORT: Ford could have problems with SYNC patents". autoblog.com. AOL Inc. Archived from the original on 2011-01-11. ""The "SYNC" name is a Ford trademark. It is a Ford brand, and therefore cannot be used by anyone else, including being applied to the Microsoft Auto operating platform."
- "About SYNC". ford.com. Ford Motor Company. 2010. Archived from the original on 2010-11-27. "SYNC is an easy-to-use in-car connectivity system that allows you to make hands-free calls and control your music and other functions with simple voice commands."
- "Availability". ford.com. Ford Motor Company. 2010. Archived from the original on 2010-11-29. "View the latest SYNC-equipped vehicles"
- "A Technical Companion to Windows Embedded Automotive 7 (final)" (PDF). microsoft.com. Microsoft Corporation. July 2010. Archived from the original (PDF) on 2010-11-17. "Ford SYNC is a factory-installed, fully integrated in-vehicle communications and entertainment system that provides drivers with hands-free voice-activated control over mobile phones and digital music players."
- "Best of What's New 2007". popsci.com. Popular Science. 2007. Archived from the original on 2009-03-06. "Automotive – Ford and Microsoft Sync – Cars and gadgets play nice"
- "Ford Work Solutions" (PDF). media.ford.com. Ford Motor Company. September 2009. Archived from the original (PDF) on 2011-08-15. "Ford Work Solutions is a collection of affordable technologies that provide Ford truck customers connectivity, flexibility, visibility and security to better run key aspects of their business"
- "Ford Work Solutions Expands Capability and Productivity of America's Favorite Work Trucks". media.ford.com. Ford Motor Company. 2009-03-03. Archived from the original on 2009-11-09. "...provides full high-speed Internet access via the Sprint Mobile Broadband Network..."
- Mike Rowe (Host), Paul Russell (Marketing Manager, Ford Work Solutions) (2009-03-30). Microsoft Showcase: Ford Work Solutions with Ford Sync powered by Microsoft (Web video). Microsoft Corporation. Archived from the original (Silverlight) on 2010-09-27. "This is a system called Tool Link that we developed with DeWalt."
- "The Top 10 Most Brilliant Gadgets of 2007". popularmechanics.com. Hearst Communication, Inc. 2007-10-01. Archived from the original on 2011-04-12. "Ford's $395 Sync is essentially a small computer running the Microsoft Auto operating system that wirelessly integrates all of your mobile gadgets."
- "US: Ford demonstrates new 'Sync' system at Detroit motor show". automotiveworld.com. automotive world ltd. 2007-01-08. Archived from the original on 2011-07-22. "Sync will become available in North America for the following 12 Ford Group vehicles..."
- "2009 Mustang Sync Kit Manual SK9R3J-14F013-AA" (PDF). partscheap.com. Ford Motor Company. 2008. Archived from the original (PDF) on 2011-07-15. "The Sync system is comprised of the following: Accessory protocol interface module (APIM)..."
