= EcoDrive =

Automotive software by Fiat and Microsoft

EcoDrive is free software codeveloped by Microsoft and Fiat. It was unveiled at the 2008 Paris Motor Show, and its aim was to allow drivers to reduce their fuel consumption and pollution emissions. It was available for Fiat 500 and Fiat Grande Punto and in 2009 throughout the whole Fiat range equipped with Blue&Me.

The EcoDrive user application was written using Adobe Air to facilitate cross-platform use by the UK consulting firm AKQA. When the car is driven, EcoDrive collects all the data about CO_{2} emission and fuel consumption. Additionally, EcoDrive allows users to receive driving tips on how to achieve a lower environmental impact.
