= SIRIUS Travel Link =

SIRIUS Travel Link is a subscription-based commercial data service owned and operated by Sirius XM Holdings.

== Services ==
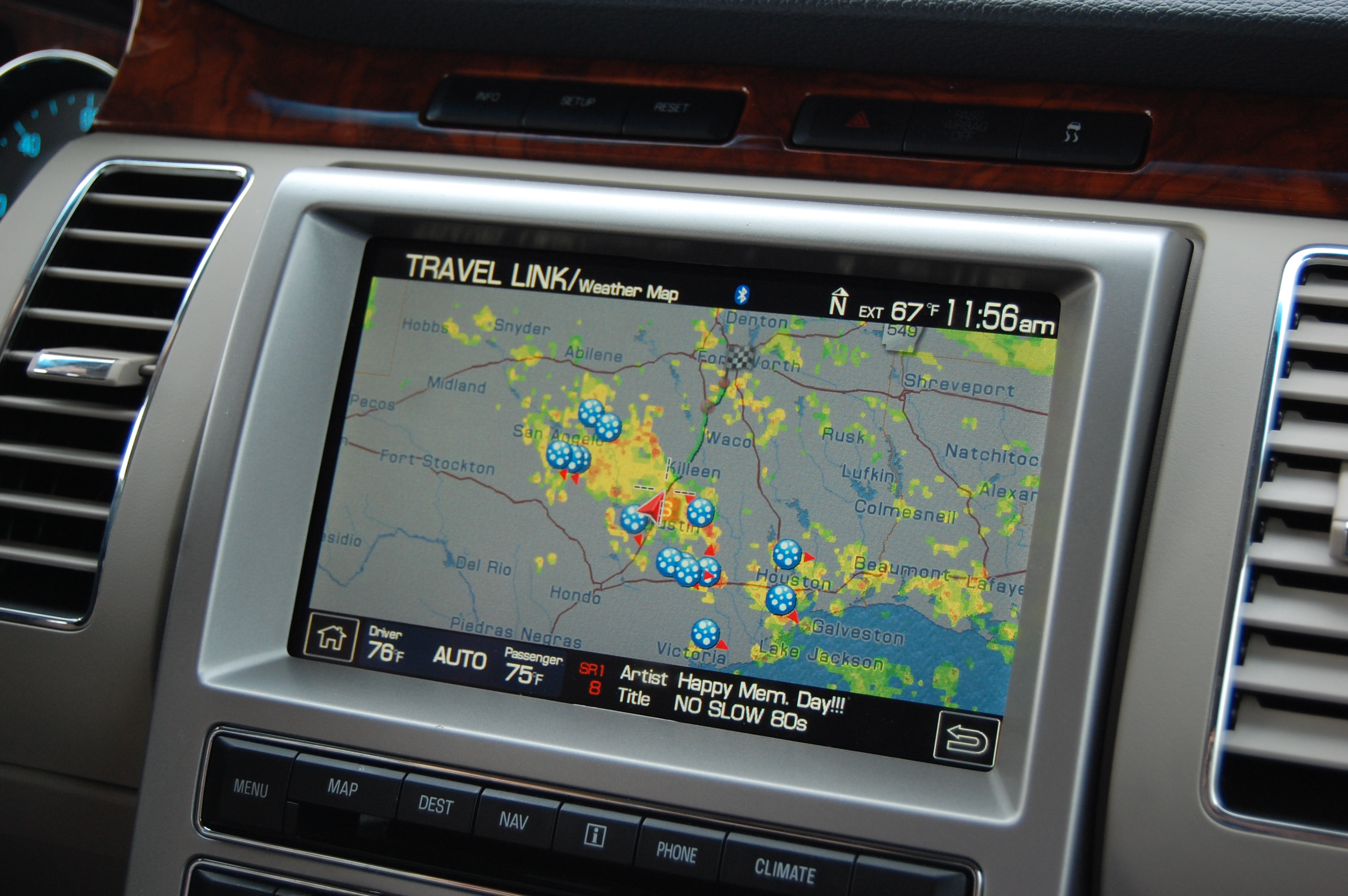
Sirius Travel Link Weather Maps

- Sirius XM Satellite Radio
  - Over 150 different radio stations, commercial free available via satellite.
- SIRIUS Weather
  - Temperature and Humidity, Wind Speed and Direction, Cloud Cover details.
  - Precipitation type, chance, and amount.
  - 5-day city forecasts for your location including daily high and low temperatures.
  - Local ski resort conditions.
  - Detailed Weather Maps.
- SIRIUS Fuel Prices (Not currently available in Canada)
  - Detailed fuel price information. Find the lowest price in your area.
  - See fuel types available.
- SIRIUS Sports Scores
  - Game Schedules
  - Play-by-play details
- SIRIUS Movie Listings (Not currently available in Canada)
  - Continually updated, detailed listings of the top 40 movies playing nationwide.
  - Movie descriptions, lengths and ratings.
  - Locations and movie showtime

== SIRIUS Traffic ==
SIRIUS Traffic is a premium data service, providing continuous updates pertaining to circumstances on upcoming roads and highways, such as road closures, traffic accidents, and road works. SIRIUS Traffic is available without Travel Link, but all vehicles that do come with Travel Link come with SIRIUS Traffic.

== Availability ==
Service availability varies by vehicle make and model.

The service is currently available to the following makes.

- Most Chrysler Group/Fiat Chrysler Automobiles vehicles (2011+)
- Most Ford Motor Company vehicles (2009+)
- Most General Motors vehicles (2013–2016)
- Most Hyundai and Kia vehicles (2014+)
- Most Nissan and Infiniti vehicles (2012+)
- Most Porsche vehicles (2014+)
- Most Subaru vehicles (2015+)
- Most Volkswagen vehicles (2016+)
- Certain Mercedes-Benz and Volvo models
- Certain Mazda models (2021-)

== See also ==
- Ford Sync
- MyFord Touch
- SIRIUS Satellite Radio
