= UVO =

UVO (all caps) is an acronym. It can mean:

- A telematics system from Kia Motors, Kia UVO.
- Ukrainian Military Organization (Ukrainian: Українська Військова Організація, UVO), a Ukrainian resistance and sabotage movement active in Poland between the world wars.
- Used vegetable oil, used cooking oil recycled for use as a biofuel without conversion to biodiesel.
