= OVMS =

Connectivity system for electric vehicles

The OVMS (Open Vehicle Monitoring System) allows a user to connect to the CAN bus in a vehicle so that the user can view and monitor several parameters of vehicle operation, such as state of battery charge for an electric vehicle. The system includes hardware (a board that connects to the vehicle), a server, and mobile device software. Early work on this system was done by enthusiasts of the Tesla Roadster; the system is also being adapted for use with the Nissan LEAF, Chevrolet Volt / Opel Ampera, Renault Twizy, Think City, Tazzari Zero, Mitsubishi i-MiEV and Kyburz and has a Generic OBDII module. OVMS has similarities to Nissan's proprietary CarWings system.
