= ILane =

iLane is a portable, in-car telematics, infotainment platform developed by Intelligent Mechatronic Systems (IMS) in Waterloo, Ontario. The iLane system provides any automobile access to cloud and locally stored content from the user's BlackBerry through the smartphone's digital wireless network. Using a variety of applications, iLane sends audio-only content to any Bluetooth audio device including a Bluetooth headset. The iLane platform uses the latest advances in text-to-speech (or speech synthesis) and speech recognition to let the driver control the infotainment system by voice only.

== Applications ==
The iLane platform's most popular applications is email, it reads the user's email aloud through a Bluetooth audio device. It also has apps for smartphone calendar data, news, sports and weather by location, all controlled by the user's voice. Most recently IMS has added an app that lets the driver send and receive SMS text messages.

== Features ==
The system is compatible with any email or web-mail account added to the BlackBerry messaging system including G-mail, Yahoo and Hotmail as well as any BIS or BES email account already registered on the BlackBerry device. The system receives online content using a secure connection to IMS servers through a mobile gateway which is downloaded from IMS to the BlackBerry device and then continues to use the secure BlackBerry wireless network. Local Bluetooth-to-smartphone security is provided by 256-bit encryption from the smartphone to the audio device but is also encrypted 512-bit on the device before it is broadcast Advanced Encryption Standard.

== Critical reception ==
iLane has received industry recognition including Andrew Seybold Choice Awards for 2009 and 2010. and was named CTIA Hot For The Holidays in both 2009 and 2010 Award Winner for "Hottest Bluetooth Accessory." The device has received widely positive media reviews for its operation and ease of use. David Pogue of the NY Times calls it: "…ingenious, polished and efficient." The widest criticism about iLane, has been related to discomfort interacting with a voice-controlled system and the unit's cost with the inclusion of a monthly fee. IMS has since lowered iLane's retail price.

== Distribution ==
Hands-free legislation across North America has provided increased interest in iLane and similar in-car telematics systems offering voice control. Ford SYNC and GM OnStar and MyLink are examples of factory-installed infotainment systems also designed to mitigate distracted driving with voice-activated controls. One key difference is that iLane is an after-market solution and can go with the driver from car to car. The hardware that provides the iLane platform can be powered by any car's cigarette lighter and is compatible with nearly any Bluetooth audio system and smartphone using Blackberry Operating System 4.1 or higher.

In July 2009, IMS announced that Bell Mobility stores across Canada would carry iLane for use with smartphones on its wireless network. In the US iLane is distributed by True Wireless. Areas with hands-free laws that permit the use of a Bluetooth headset are able to use iLane legally.

Following the launch of iLane across Bell Mobility stores in Canada, the 3rd largest Canadian carrier TELUS mobility also began to distribute the product in February 2010.
