= MyFord Touch =

Vehicular entertainment system

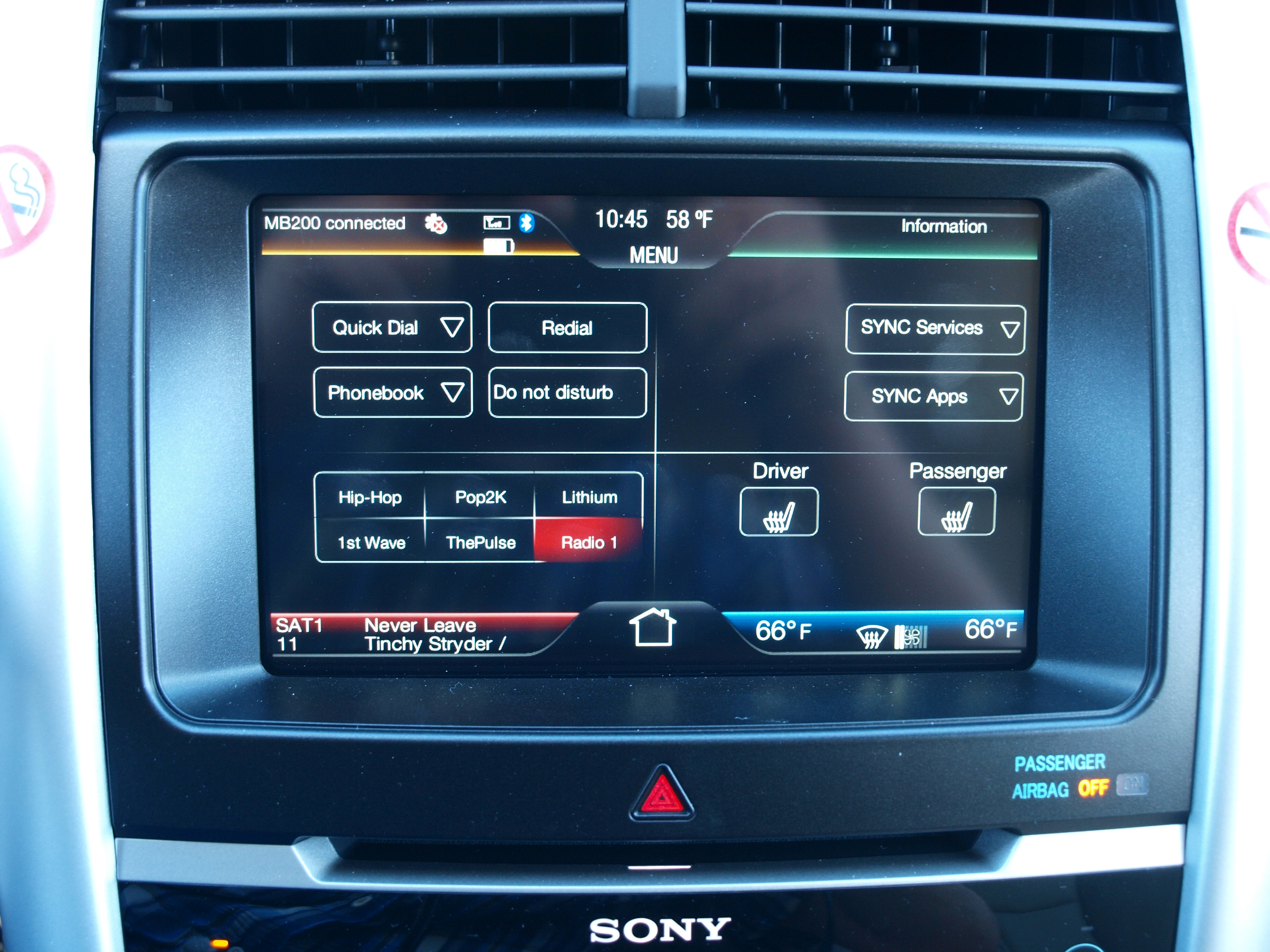
The MyFord Touch System's 8" LCD screen, as implemented in a 2011 Ford Edge

MyFord Touch (branded as MyLincoln Touch on Ford's Lincoln brand products, and also known as SYNC 2) is an in-car communications and entertainment system developed by the Ford Motor Company, based on Microsoft technologies. The technology was factory installed with Ford product offerings and was based on the Microsoft Auto 4.0 software platform. It was regarded as the next-generation of Ford Sync. Announced in January 2010, at the Consumer Electronics Show (CES), the technology launched with the 2011 Ford Edge. Reviews of MyFord Touch were overwhelmingly negative. A USB drive, self-installed software upgrade became available in March, 2012; this update was mailed out free-of-charge to all Ford customers, and Ford also offered free installation of the update by any Ford dealer. The update did not address continuing problems with light-touch capacitor switches (on cars so equipped) that control many functions. Several updates have since been released which allowed for more natural speech recognition, simpler Bluetooth pairing, and refinement of the on-screen interface and menus.

== Overview ==
MyFord Touch promised to enable drivers of Ford cars to seamlessly integrate nearly all mobile phones, PDAs and digital media players into their cars. Operation of these devices, utilizing advanced Ford Sync functionality, was performed using voice commands, touch-screen inputs, the vehicle's steering wheel, radio controls, Bluetooth and Wi-Fi connectivity. MyFord Touch is also capable of receiving text messages and reading these text messages aloud to occupants of the car.

Fulfillment of the system's promise has fallen short, with thousands of MyFord Touch owners complaining that the system is unreliable, that it crashes without warning, that it fails to respond to commands, and that it fails to integrate with common mobile devices, such as the iPhone. Ford reliability ratings, both by Consumer Reports and J.D. Power, have plummeted because of the defects in the MyFord Touch system, and Consumer Reports recommends that new car buyers not consider Ford or Lincoln models equipped with MyFord Touch or MyLincoln Touch.

As a stand-alone option, the MSRP for MyFord Touch is $1,000. Purchasers of this option get the MyFord Touch system with two driver-configurable 4.2" color LCD displays in the gauge cluster, one 8" color LCD touch screen in the center stack, a media hub with 2 USB ports, SD card reader, RCA video input jacks and 5-way controls located on steering wheel; Sync voice activated communications and entertainment system (Free three-year pre-paid subscription for 911 Assist, Vehicle Health Reports, traffic reports, GPS-based turn by turn driving directions and information services).

== Features ==
- Voice-Activated Commands: Uses Ford Sync to control climate, audio, phone and navigation features in a hands-free manner through the use of only their voice.
  - On-screen menus accompany voice-activated commands to let the driver see which commands they can use.
- Traffic, Directions and Information: Visual presentation of Ford Sync traffic, directions and information applications.
  - Traffic Alerts – provided by INRIX.
  - Map-based navigation application via an optional SD card – provided by TeleNav (option can be added later to MyFord Touch but it is not supported by Ford dealers, it requires installing a license).
  - SD card navigation includes services like weather maps, gas prices, and movie listings – via SIRIUS Travel Link.
- Vehicle Health Report: Vehicle Report provides an online report for the vehicle showing vehicle diagnostics, scheduled maintenance and any recall information. Vehicle Health Report allows users to schedule car service online, directly with the users' preferred car dealer, directly from the personalized online report (unavailable outside North America). This service was discontinued on August 1, 2018.
- 911 Assist: A form of Advanced Automatic Collision Notification, when sensors detect the vehicle has been involved in a collision involving airbag deployment and, on certain vehicles, where the emergency fuel pump shut-off is activated, 911 Assist puts the occupant(s) of the car directly in contact with a 911 operator. 911 Assist provides a 10-second window where occupants have the option to cancel the call before dialing. Where occupants of the car are unable to speak, 911 Assist delivers an emergency message to the 911 operator (unavailable outside North America).
- Internet Connectivity: MyFord Touch provides Wi-Fi capability. It also includes hotspot connectivity, which lets other devices to share the MyFord Touch system's internet connection.
  - Supports on-screen and USB-connected keyboards.
  - RSS feed aggregator and text-to-voice reader.
  - In-car Wi-Fi hot-spot capability through USB mobile broadband modem or USB-installed Aircard.
- Media features:
  - Two USB 2.0 inputs, MyFord Touch provides compatibility with USB-connected MP3 players.
  - SD card slot
  - RCA jack input for audio and video (video input removed on some 2014+ vehicles)
  - AM/FM radio, CD player, Sirius Satellite Radio, HD Radio capability
  - Internet Media player equipped with new Podcast category
  - Bluetooth Enhanced Data Rate audio support

== MyFord Touch availability ==
=== North America ===
- Ford C-Max – from MY2013
- Ford Edge – from MY2011
- Ford Escape – from MY2013
- Ford Expedition – from MY2015
- Ford Explorer – from MY2011
- Ford F-150 – from MY2013
- Ford Fiesta – from MY2014
- Ford Flex – from MY2013
- Ford Focus – from MY2012
- Ford Fusion – from MY2013
- Ford Mustang – from MY2015
- Ford Super Duty – from MY2013
- Ford Taurus – from MY2013
- Ford Transit – from MY2015
- Ford Transit Connect – from MY2014
- Lincoln Continental – from MY2017
- Lincoln Navigator – from MY2015
- Lincoln MKC – from MY2015
- Lincoln MKS – from MY2013
- Lincoln MKT – from MY2013
- Lincoln MKX – from MY2011
- Lincoln MKZ – from MY2013

=== Asia Pacific ===
- Ford Everest – from MY2015 (branded as SYNC2)
- Ford Ranger – from MY2015 (branded as SYNC2)

=== Australia ===
- Ford Falcon – from MY2014 (branded as SYNC2)
- Ford Territory – from MY2014 (branded as SYNC2)

=== Europe ===
- Ford Focus – from MY2015 (branded as SYNC2)
- Ford Mondeo – from MY2015
- Ford Tourneo Connect – from MY2016 (branded as SYNC2)

== Criticism ==
Unreliability of the MyFord Touch system has been cited by J.D. Power & Associates as the primary factor contributing to a decline in Ford's standing in the 2011 "Initial Quality Survey" of new car purchasers. The study ranked 2011 Ford vehicles' initial quality in 23rd position, down from fifth position in 2010. The ranking of Lincoln vehicles, a Ford subsidiary that also uses the Touch system branded as "MyLincoln Touch," declined from eighth to 17th place year over year. Consumer Reports recommends that no one consider buying used 2011 Ford Edges equipped with MyFord Touch systems. As Ford has expanded availability of its MyFord Touch system to more vehicles (e.g. the 2013 Ford Flex), Consumer Reports has downgraded its ratings for vehicles so equipped.

Early purchasers of the first generation MyFord Touch system complained that MyFord Touch systems crashed without warning, did not reliably respond to touch commands, and often failed to sync with mobile phones and iPods. The March 2012 MyFord Touch upgrade, addressed some of these performance issues, however even the latest MyFord Touch systems (on the 2013 Ford Flex, for example) use capacitive, rather than standard, switches that lack positive feel and are extremely difficult to use with gloves on.

Initial reception of the March 2012 software upgrade, which overhauled the user interface and addressed many performance issues, has been largely positive. There has since been several incremental software upgrades, addressing some issues that have plagued the system since its introduction, such as touchscreen menu lag and voice recognition commands. However, problems remain, and some owners continue to experience difficulties with the system, even with the new upgrade fully installed. As a result of falling reliability rankings and widespread customer complaints, Ford announced they would extend the warranty on the MyFord Touch system to five years with unlimited miles, up from three years and 36,000 miles. Some owners have expressed their hope that Ford will continue upgrading the MyFord Touch system until it fulfills its original design promises; meanwhile owners must make do with remaining glitches.

In order to address the many criticisms on the Microsoft-powered system, Ford decided to use BlackBerry's QNX CAR Platform for Infotainment beginning in 2015, referred to by Ford as Sync 3. This QNX-based system has been shown to be much more responsive and stable. Unfortunately, it does not appear that Ford will allow owners of vehicles with MyFord Touch to upgrade to Sync 3.

== End of life ==
Though Ford has yet to confirm when it will officially stop producing software updates for SYNC2, it is evident that it has entered its end-of-life stage.

While 3.8 was thought to be the last official version, 3.10 was released to address certain bugs on November 16, 2017, marking over 7 years since an official update. The update has not been readily available in Europe, where Ford does not have a customer self-service portal and dealers are not always willing to update due to very slow download speeds for the update and the low success rates causing total failure of the unit. Only certain technicians are trained to perform the upgrade, leading to limited knowledge and natural avoidance in performing the upgrade in case of problems.

A service bulletin regarding the software update suggests that unless specific problems are encountered with the device, the software update should not be performed. Once updated, it is impossible to downgrade.

This update has appeared in an unofficial form on some Ford forums and has been installed by many.

== Discontinuation ==
SYNC2 was officially discontinued as of Q4 2015 and is no longer available as an option to order. New vehicles ordered with the option and built from Q4 2015 onwards should automatically be fitted with SYNC3 depending on build cycle. Existing stocks are being held back for repairs and replacements as a significant problem still exists in early models and will be covered under warranty if the customer happens to notice the flaw. This only affects EU models and only when combined with certain other options. E.g. climate control. Affected vehicles under warranty can be replaced with the SYNC3 system to eradicate the issues that exist with SYNC2.

In a confidential document circulated around dealerships in the US in Q1 2015 and Europe in Q2 2015, dealers were encouraged to push the SYNC2 system to reduce stocks notifying them of advance warning of the discontinuation in Q4 and only offer SYNC3 if the customer specifically asked for it. SYNC3 has been available as an option to order on certain models as far back as Q1 2015 and was extended to additional models in Q2.

In certain models, SYNC2 and SYNC3 are directly interchangeable, however, units equipped with Navigation require replacement of the USB hub. All versions require replacement of the GPS antenna, usually hidden in the dashboard.

== SYNC2 warranty ==
Any units which have failed and where the vehicle is under warranty will naturally be rectified under the warranty scheme, however, it is likely a SYNC2 unit will be replaced with a SYNC2 unit where on-hand stock permits, unless there are repeated reproducible problems and the customer has noticed one of the many operational issues that exist.

Ford has a strict policy relating to repeated failures of a component, which this component falls into, suggesting fitment of a SYNC3 unit where applicable to prevent further failures.

An internal document circulated in Q4 2015 stated that any new vehicle from Q1 2016 onwards fitted with SYNC2 upon delivery should be replaced under warranty. This was intended to safeguard the batch building and storing of vehicles being equipped with the older option and making it to market during the crossover period. This was also intended to safeguard against dealerships pre-ordering vehicles and storing them against possible future orders.

== See also ==
- Blue&Me
- Comand APS – from Mercedes
- Hyundai Blue Link
- iDrive – from BMW
- Kia UVO
- Lexus Link
- Multi Media Interface (MMI) – from Audi
- OnStar
- Sirius Satellite Radio
- Toyota Entune
