= Hyundai Blue Link =

Vehicle telematic system

Hyundai Bluelink (also branded as Genesis Connected Services) is a vehicle system that uses a mobile app from Hyundai to allow the user to retrieve information about their vehicle and perform basic remote operations. Bluelink functionality varies based on the type of vehicle as well as the type of cell service modem the vehicle is equipped with. In the United States, the Bluelink system debuted on the 2012 Hyundai Veloster as standard equipment and has become an available feature on most Hyundai models sold since then. The service currently costs $99 a year and can be used for roadside service, performance information, and remote start, stop, and lock/unlock features.

== Connectivity ==
Smartphones can connect to Hyundai Bluelink over Bluetooth or USB with the Hyundai Bluelink mobile app. The in-car software checks for updates every time the vehicle turns on, keeping the included applications up-to-date.

When Bluelink first launched, cell connectivity was provided by a joint partnership between Aeris Communications, Inc., and Sprint Corp. On January 21, 2014, Hyundai announced it had selected Verizon Enterprise Solutions with integration provided by Opentext. Hyundai announced that starting in the 2022 model year, 2012–2018 vehicles would not have Bluelink support due to the discontinuation of 2G and 3G cell service.

== See also ==
- Microsoft Auto
- Ford Sync
- MyFord Touch
- Toyota Entune
- Kia Connect
