= MSN Direct =

Defunct FM radio-based digital service

MSN Direct was an FM radio-based digital service which allowed 'SPOT' portable devices to receive information from MSN services. Devices that supported MSN Direct included wristwatches, desktop clocks, in-car GPS satellite navigation units, and even small appliances such as coffee makers. Information available through paid "channels" included weather, horoscopes, stocks, news, sports results and calendar notifications. The service also allowed users to receive short messages from Windows Live Messenger.

Some Garmin GPS units, such as the nüvi 680, allowed traffic notifications, weather forecasts, movie schedules and local gas prices to be received through MSN Direct.

As a radio-based service, MSN Direct did not have universal coverage, but was available in populated parts of the United States and Canada. It was not launched in other areas.

Microsoft's latest expansion of MSN Direct was to the Windows Mobile platform. MSN Direct for Windows Mobile took advantage of both cellular and Wi-Fi connections, and allowed Microsoft devices to better compete with the information services available on other mobile phone platforms.

There were three versions of the MSN Direct software for Garmin nüvi GPS receivers:

- Version 1, which was available for the Garmin nüvi 205 (or higher) series, allowed users to receive local gas prices, movie times, weather forecasts, and current conditions.
- Version 2, which was available for series 700 and 800 of nüvi receivers, offered enhanced movie listings, local events, news, stock prices, and the ability to send Microsoft's Live Search Maps data to a nüvi.
- Version 3 offered general airport delays for incoming and outgoing flights (but not individual flight delays) and a Doppler weather radar map when viewing weather.

The service was shut down on January 1, 2012, as originally announced in October 2009. Garmin later offered NuLink! services on select Nuvi receivers.

== See also ==
- DirectBand
- Datacast
- Pager
