= Windows Embedded Automotive =

Discontinued family of Embedded operating systems by Microsoft based on Windows CE

- Logo of Microsoft Auto
- Developer: Microsoft
- OS family: Windows Embedded
- Source model: Closed source
- Initial release: December 4, 1998
- Final release: 7 / October 19, 2010
- License: Commercial software
- Official website: www.microsoft.com/windowsembedded/en-us/windows-embedded-automotive-7.aspx

Support status
- Windows Automotive 4.2: Mainstream support ended on July 8, 2008; Extended support ended on July 9, 2013
- Windows Automotive 5.0: Mainstream support ended on January 11, 2011; Extended support ended on January 12, 2016
- Windows Embedded Automotive 7: Support ended on March 1, 2021

Original logo of Windows Automotive

Windows Embedded Automotive (formerly Microsoft Auto, Windows CE for Automotive, Windows Automotive, and Windows Mobile for Automotive) is a discontinued operating system that was part of the Windows Embedded family and based on Windows CE for use on computer systems in automobiles. The operating system is developed by Microsoft through the Microsoft Automotive Business Unit that formed in August 1995. The first automotive product built by Microsoft's Automotive Business Unit debuted on December 4, 1998, as the AutoPC, and also includes Ford Sync, Kia Connect, and Blue&Me. Microsoft's Automotive Business Unit has built both the software platforms used for automotive devices as well as the devices themselves. The current focus is on the software platforms and includes two products, Microsoft Auto and Windows Automotive.

== History ==
The Windows Embedded Automotive operating system was originally shipped with the AutoPC that was jointly developed by Microsoft and Clarion. The system was released in December 1998, and referred to the operating system itself as "Auto PC". Microsoft's Auto PC platform was based on Windows CE 2.0, and had been announced in January of that year.

On October 16, 2000, Microsoft officially announced the next version of the platform. This version of the operating system was renamed to "Windows CE for Automotive" and had new applications preinstalled like the Microsoft Mobile Explorer.

On October 21, 2002, Microsoft announced that the platform would be renamed to "Windows Automotive". The version added support for development using the .NET Compact Framework.

Windows Automotive 4.2 reached General Availability on June 1, 2003 and Windows Automotive 5.0 reached GA on August 8, 2005.

With the release of Ford Sync, Microsoft renamed the platform from "Windows Mobile for Automotive" to "Microsoft Auto".

Microsoft again renamed the operating system as "Windows Embedded Automotive", and updated its version to 7 on October 19, 2010. This is the latest in MS Auto category, and is based on the Windows CE platform.

Windows Embedded Automotive 7 reached GA on March 1, 2011.

In December 2014, Ford announced that the company would be replacing Microsoft Auto with BlackBerry Limited's QNX.
