= Blue&Me =

In-vehicle infotainment system

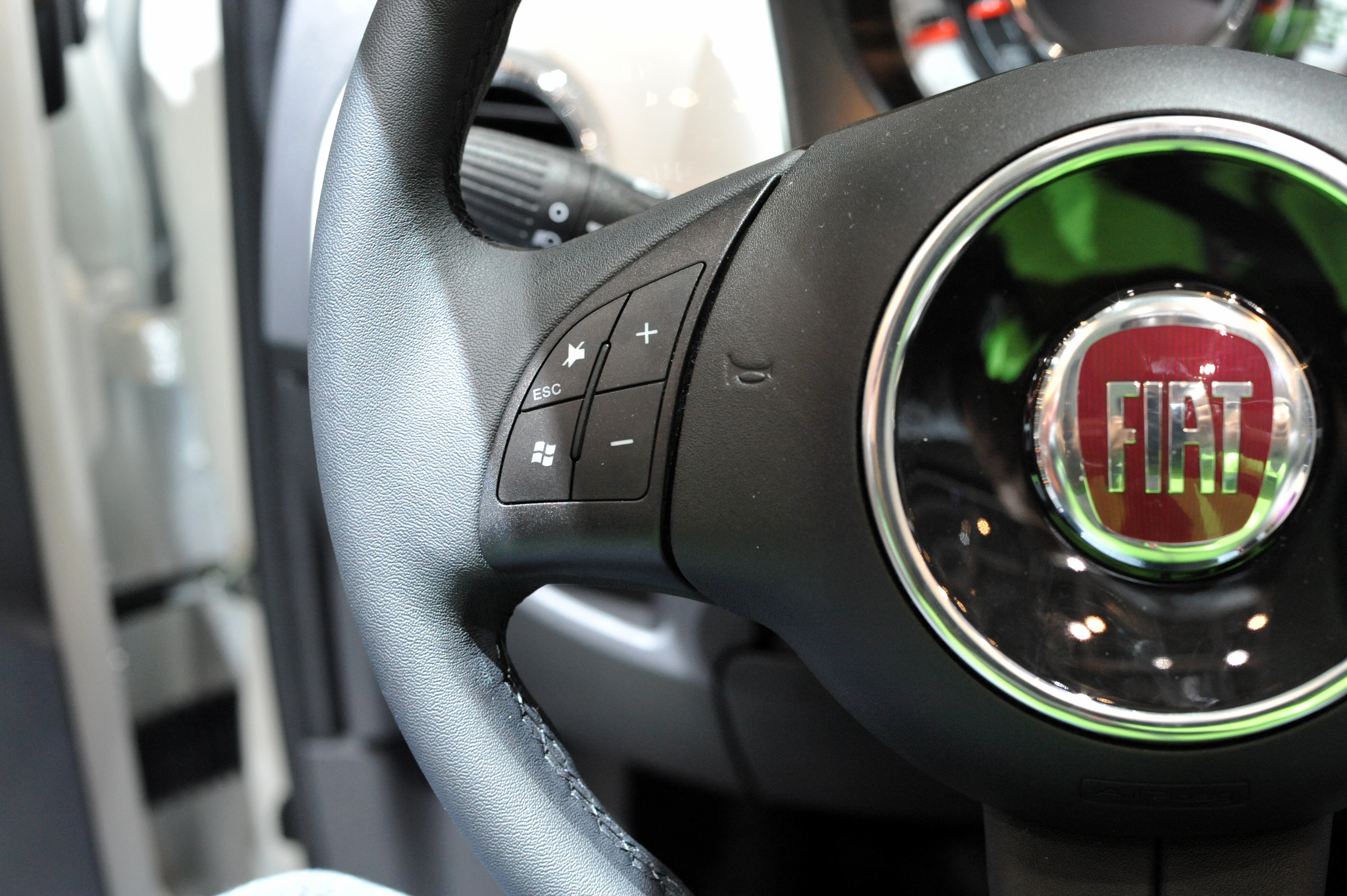
Fiat Blue and Me Geneva Auto Show 2011 March

Blue&Me is an integrated in-vehicle infotainment system used worldwide on many vehicles marketed by Fiat Chrysler Automobiles (FCA) from model years 2006–2017. With the exception of the Ford Ka, which is a lightly modified Fiat 500, the system is exclusive to Abarth, Alfa Romeo, Fiat and Lancia cars and to Fiat Professional's light commercial vehicles (for example, Fiat Ducato, as well as associated vehicles such as Peugeot Boxer and Citroën Jumper/relay)

Developed over three years beginning in 2003 in partnership with CRF (Centro Ricerche FIAT), Magneti Marelli and Microsoft, and based on Windows Embedded Automotive, Blue&Me was formally launched in 2006 at the Geneva Auto Show. The system uses a paired Bluetooth-compatible phone to allow users to make hands-free telephone calls, control music, and other functions using voice commands and steering-wheel mounted controls.

== Development history ==
Fiat and Microsoft first announced their partnership in July 2004, stating they would jointly "develop innovative telematics solutions for motorists" to "enable drivers to communicate effectively with the outside world." Magneti Marelli would manufacture the hardware, based on a reference design set by Microsoft and Fiat. The system was developed to be compatible with most mobile phones and media players.

The new Blue&Me system debuted on the Alfa Romeo 159, Alfa Romeo Brera, and Fiat Grande Punto, which were shown at the 2006 Geneva Motor Show. By 2007, Fiat were reporting that 20% of customers were requesting Blue&Me, and had announced an integrated navigation system, Blue&Me Nav.

In 2012, Fiat rolled out the successor Uconnect 5.0 system, which was also powered by Windows Embedded Automotive. Uconnect 5.0 was developed by Continental Automotive Group and was first deployed in the Fiat 500L.

== Key features ==
Initial features included Bluetooth and USB connectivity to mobile phones and personal media players. It also provided a hands-free system, allowing a user to control features by voice commands after alerting the system by depressing a button mounted on the steering wheel. Speech recognition and text-to-speech technology from Nuance Communications was used to support nine different languages, including Dutch, English, French, German, Italian, Polish, Portuguese, and Spanish. Blue&Me could recognize user voice commands to place calls, read SMS messages, and control media player functions. Because Blue&Me does not support A2DP, audio cannot be streamed directly to the system from a Bluetooth device; the media device must instead be connected via the USB port or a USB Bluetooth receiver supporting A2DP could be used.

Using an open architecture, Blue&Me was an updatable application platform, allowing modular add-on functionality so the system could evolve by adding new functions. After its introduction, the system was expanded to include an SMS Reader, a driving coach application (marketed as eco:Drive), navigation capabilities (marketed as Blue&Me Nav, Blue&Me MAP, and Blue&Me Tomtom), and a fleet management capability (marketed as Blue&Me Fleet), to connect a central computer with a fleet vehicle in real time, where data is transmitted automatically to allow real-time mileage and operating cost analysis.

=== Navigation ===
Blue&Me Nav is an enhanced system which adds GPS navigation features. It utilizes maps provided by Navteq or Tomtom. At the 2007 Bologna Motor Show, Fiat presented a new navigation extension to the Blue&Me system called Blue&Me Map, which includes a separate portable navigation unit.

=== eco:Drive ===
eco:Drive was first presented as a preview at the Frankfurt Motor Show 2007 and then officially unveiled at the 2008 Paris Motor Show. It is a new service component which offers the ability to track driving efficiency. It collects data about CO_{2} emissions and fuel consumption and saves them to a USB key, which can then be connected to a PC for analysis. It is now available for Fiat 500, Fiat Linea, Fiat Grande Punto and Fiat Bravo. Fiat Automobiles announced that in 2009 eco:Drive will be available for every car equipped with Blue&Me.

=== Known problems ===
A flashing odometer could indicate a problem with the unit. Especially If it is not reading USB or Bluetooth is not working. Some owners have also reported that a malfunction can cause a power drain from the battery, causing the battery to discharge in a couple of days if the vehicle is not driven.

== Blue&Me applications ==
- Abarth Grande Punto
- Abarth Punto Evo
- Alfa Romeo 159
- Alfa Romeo Brera
- Alfa Romeo Spider
- Alfa Romeo 147
- Alfa Romeo GT
- Alfa Romeo MiTo
- Alfa Romeo Giulietta
- Fiat Croma
- Fiat Doblo (Option)
- Fiat 500 (2007)
- Fiat Grande Punto/Punto Evo/Punto 2012
- Fiat Linea
- Fiat Bravo
- Fiat Panda (2011)
- Fiat Fiorino
- Fiat Qubo
- Ford Ka (Rebranded as Ford Audio)
- Lancia Ypsilon
- Lancia Musa
- Lancia Delta III
- Fiat Ducato/Peugeot Boxer/Citroën Jumper/Citroën Relay (Option)
- Opel/Vauxhall Combo (Option)
