= Kia Connect =

Vehicle telematic system

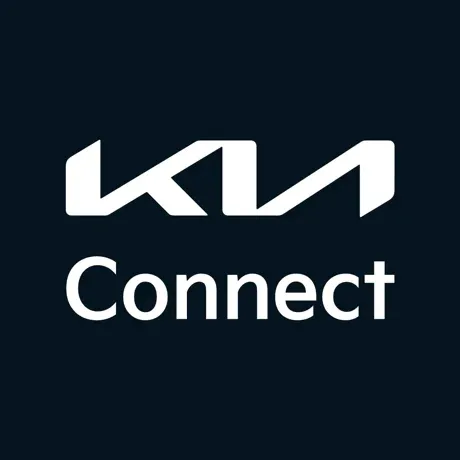
- Original author: Kia America
- Developer: Kia America
- Release: January 2011
- Available in: English, French, Spanish, German
- Type: Telematics
- License: Proprietary commercial software
- Website: owners.kia.com/content/owners/en/about-uvo-link.html

Kia Connect, formerly UVO eServices, is a paid subscription OEM infotainment and telematics service offered by Kia Motors America on select vehicles for the United States market. The system allows users to make hands-free calls on their smartphone, stream music, navigate to a POI, and perform vehicle diagnostics with the use of voice commands.

The integrated in-vehicle communications and entertainment system is developed by Kia Motors and other third-party developers.

Kia UVO Logo

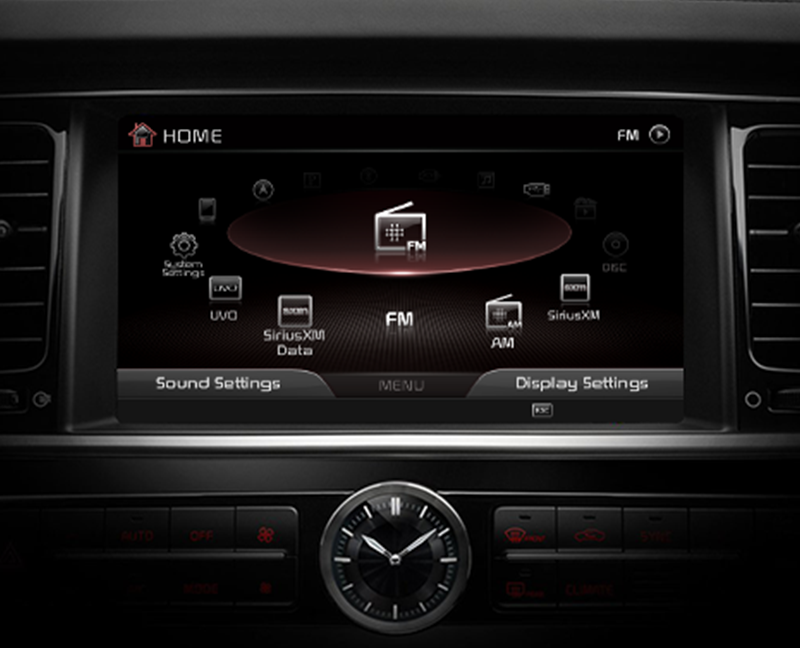
UVO eServices with Premium Nav, in a 2015 K900

== Overview ==
First launched in the 2011 model year, Kia's UVO entertainment system included an HD radio, a CD player, and a built-in digital jukebox. The system also interfaces with Bluetooth-enabled phones and utilizes touchscreen and voice command technology.

The UVO system is driven by vehicle communications with a smartphone application. Data transfers from the vehicle to the smartphone application utilize the customer's mobile carrier resulting in a subscription-free telematics service. Users of the system are able to interact with their vehicle to retrieve diagnostic trouble codes. Users can also load a point of interest to the vehicle's head unit. Other technologies like GPS and interactive voice response are also integrated into the system.

Users are able to access the vehicle data on the smartphone application and through a customer web portal. In the 2015 model year, select vehicles launched with an Android-based operating platform to allow flexibility to integrate 3rd-party applications. Certain vehicles have USB (for model years 2014 and later) and Wi-Fi connectivity (for model years 2015 and later).

The service was renamed Kia Connect in September 2021.

== Infotainment features ==
The below table provides a short description of UVO eServices features. Feature availability depends on model and model year.

	Feature	Description
UVO Features	Sirius XM TravelLink	SiriusXM Travel Link provides real-time information on Weather, Traffic, Fuel Prices, Stocks, Sports, and Movies.
UVO Features	Parking Minder	Parking Minder can store and display the last known location where a vehicle was parked.
UVO Features	My POIs	Users can store a list of addresses that can be synced to a UVO head unit and used by the Navigation feature.
UVO Features	Pandora	The Pandora app for the UVO head unit can connect to a user's Pandora smartphone app to play songs and display track information.
UVO Features	Trip Info	View analytics about monthly driving habits, such as average speed, average time, and average distance.
UVO Features	My Car Zone	A set of monitoring features including Curfew Limit Alert, Speed Alert, and Geo Fence Alert.
UVO Features	Curfew Limit Alert	Stores an alert when a UVO vehicle is driven after a user configured curfew time.
UVO Features	Speed Alert	Stores an alert when a UVO vehicle is driven faster than a user-configured speed limit.
UVO Features	Geo Fence Alert	Stores an alert when a UVO vehicle is driven within a user configured restricted area.
UVO Features	Vehicle Diagnostics	UVO vehicles can identify when there is a diagnostic issue. UVO owners can view diagnostic issues and send the report to a dealership when scheduling a service appointment.
UVO Features	Critical Diagnostic Alert	Critical Diagnostic Alert can notify the driver if a diagnostic issue is found.
UVO Features	Scheduled Diagnostics	Diagnostic checks can be scheduled to run on a monthly cycle.
UVO Features	Enhanced Roadside Assist	Enhanced Roadside Assistance can help UVO owners connect to an agent by placing a call through the owner's phone and transmitting data about the location and state of the vehicle.
UVO Features	911 Connect	In the event of an airbag deployment UVO can attempt to automatically place a call and send the vehicle's location to emergency services.
Infotainment Features	Sirius XM Radio	UVO owners with a SiriusXM subscription can listen with the integrated SiriusXM radio receiver.
Infotainment Features	SIRIUS Travel Link	UVO owners with a Sirius Travel Link subscription can access integrated weather, fuel prices, sports, movie listings, and stock prices data.
Infotainment Features	Bluetooth Audio	Bluetooth audio support includes dialing and making phone calls, syncing phone contacts, and streaming audio.
Infotainment Features	Voice Commands	Voice commands are integrated with the phone, media player, and navigation functions as well as select UVO head unit apps.
Infotainment Features	Navigation	UVO navigation is available on UVO eServices with Nav head units. It has integrations with traffic data and My POIs.

== In-vehicle apps ==
Beginning with the 2015 Optima, the UVO eServices with 8" Nav system allows users to download applications from the UVO download center for in-vehicle use via the head unit. Currently, Yelp is available in the UVO download center.

== 3rd party features ==
Beginning with 2015 Optima, the UVO eServices with 8" Nav system allows users to connect the vehicle head unit to a WiFi hotspot. Once connected to WiFi, most vehicles can access Google local search via a button on the steering wheel to search for POIs via voice recognition. The 2015 UVO eServices with 8" Nav system also supports Siri Eyes Free which allows users to access Siri via a button on the steering wheel for supported Apple devices.

== MyUVO.com ==
Owners of UVO equipped vehicles can register for an account on www.myuvo.com to view information related to their vehicle. Vehicle information available includes vehicle diagnostics, trip info, MyCarZone, and MyPOIs. In addition to viewing vehicle information, users can also view the maintenance schedule for their vehicle and schedule appointments with a dealer. Also, users can earn awards by actively using the website.

== Smartphone app ==
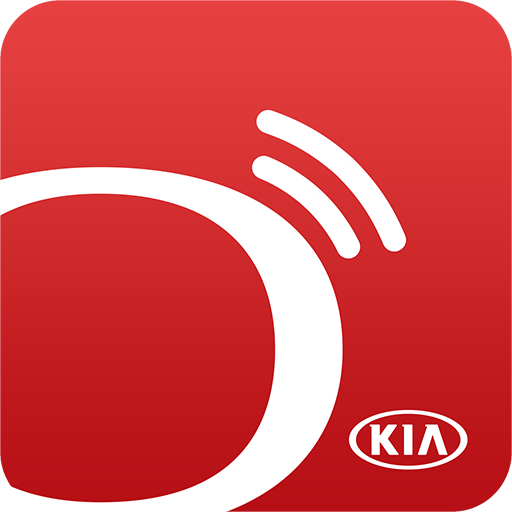
UVO eServices app launcher icon

The UVO smartphone app is available in the iTunes and Google Play stores. The app interfaces with the vehicle through a USB or Bluetooth connection. The UVO eServices with 8" Nav head unit requires a USB connection to transfer telematics data, while others use Bluetooth for data transfer. All head units can connect with Bluetooth for phone and audio functions.

=== 2014 re-design ===
In 2014, the app was re-skinned and new features were added. On compatible 2015 vehicles, the UVO app will display trip information and My Car Zone.

=== Data transfer ===
The UVO app serves as a web interface for vehicles that do not have embedded web capabilities. Data is transferred from the UVO head unit to the app via Bluetooth or USB, which is then transferred to the web and viewable from both the app and the web.

== UVO versions ==
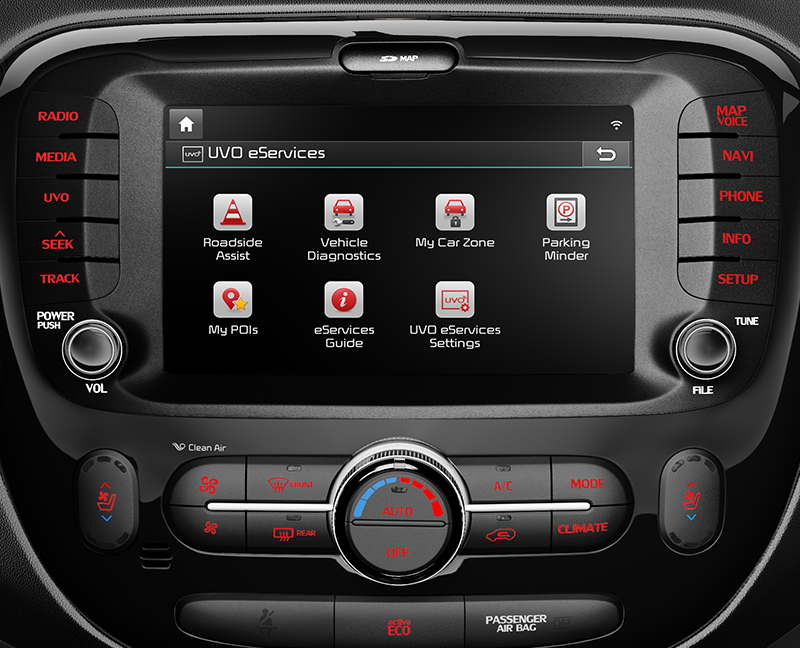
UVO eServices with 8" Nav, in a 2015 Soul

=== UVO ===
The original UVO was released on 2011 vehicles. Features include voice commands, Bluetooth, jukebox, and a rear-view camera. UVO was replaced by UVO eServices on most models by the 2014 model year. Although the standard version was discontinued, it is still used in 2015 LX, EX Sedonas.

=== UVO eServices ===
UVO eServices was the first UVO to interface with MyUVO.com and the UVO mobile app. It was introduced in the 2013 model year Optima, Optima Hybrid, and Sportage. In addition to having all of the features on the original UVO, UVO eServices has Parking Minder, Enhanced Roadside Assist, and Vehicle Diagnostics. On 2015 model year vehicles, Trip Info and My Car Zone features are included.

=== UVO eServices with 7" Nav ===
UVO eServices with 7" Nav was introduced alongside UVO eServices on some 2013 models. In addition to all of the features of UVO and UVO eServices, the 7" Nav version has Navigation and My POIs. On 2015 model year vehicles, Trip Info and My Car Zone are included.

=== UVO eServices with 8" Nav ===
UVO eServices with 8" Nav was introduced on the 2014 Soul. It has all of the features of UVO eServices with 7" Nav, the larger screen accepts swipe gestures, and features are organized in the way that apps are organized on a tablet.

On September 22, 2014, an update for the 2014 Soul UVO with Nav system was released which unlocks the eServices including My Car Zone, Vehicle Diagnostics, and 911 Connect. It also includes updated maps and improved navigation features, as well as Siri Eyes-Free.

=== UVO Premium ===
UVO Premium was designed specifically for the 2015 K900. It shares most of its features with UVO eServices with 7" Nav. It comes with a completely redesigned user interface and the touch screen from other UVO versions is replaced with a controller wheel on the center console.

== Vehicles offering UVO/Kia Connect ==
The following vehicles are UVO/Kia Connect capable, available as either an optional or standard feature. The date next to each vehicle indicates in which model year UVO was first available on that specific vehicle. On some models, UVO/Kia Connect are not available on all trim levels.

North America:

- Kia K900: 2015 and newer
- Kia Sedona: 2015 and newer (current 2015 models available in dealerships without Navigation – LX, EX, do not offer UVO with e-services as standard as stated in the brochure; only the basic UVO which was discontinued; Kia is unable to confirm when 2015 EX, LX models with UVO e-services w/o Nav will be produced)
- Kia Cadenza: 2014 and newer
- Kia Soul: 2011 and newer
- Kia Sorento: 2011 and newer
- Kia Optima: 2011 and newer
- Kia Optima Hybrid: 2011 and newer
- Kia Forte: 2017 and newer
- Kia Sportage: 2011 and newer
- Kia Rio: 2011 and newer
- Kia Sedona: 2015 and newer – Si and above have larger LCDs
- Kia Niro: 2017 and newer
- Kia Stinger: 2018 and newer
- Kia Telluride: 2020 and newer
- Kia Seltos: 2021 and newer
- Kia EV6: 2021 and newer
- Kia EV9: 2023 and newer

India

- Kia Sonet: 2020 and newer
- Kia Carens: 2022 and newer
