= Bipolar battery =

Battery design in which adjacent cells share a current collector

- Type: Battery construction
- Definition: Battery design in which adjacent cells share a common current collector, with positive active material on one face and negative material on the other
- Field: Electrochemistry, battery engineering

Design and operation
- Built since the early 1920s; commercial production limited

A bipolar battery is a battery construction in which adjacent cells within a stack share a common current collector, with the positive active material of one cell coated on one face of the collector and the negative material of the neighboring cell on the opposite face. The cells are connected in series through the plate itself rather than through external tabs and wires. Because the number of inactive components is reduced and the current path between cells is shortened, the construction offers higher power density and a more compact structure than conventional monopolar designs. The principle has been applied to lead–acid, nickel–metal hydride and lithium-ion chemistries.

== Design ==
In a conventional (monopolar) battery, each cell has its own electrodes joined to separate terminals, and cells are connected through tabs, bus bars and wiring. In a bipolar design, a conductive substrate is coated with positive active material on one side and negative material on the other, forming a bipolar plate. The positive face of one plate faces the negative face of the next, with a separator between them, so each pair of facing surfaces forms one cell, and the stack of plates delivers the sum of the cell voltages. The construction shortens the current path between adjacent cells, lowering internal resistance, and produces a more uniform current distribution over the electrode surfaces, allowing more efficient use of the active materials. The main engineering difficulties are sealing the stack, since charging, discharging and thermal cycling cause expansion and contraction that stress the seals, and maintaining uniform compression across the cells during manufacture.

== Lead–acid batteries ==
The first bipolar lead–acid batteries were built in the early 1920s. They showed performance improvements, but suffered from electrolyte leakage and intermixing between cells, problems that remained unsolved for much of the following century; commercial production of bipolar lead–acid batteries has stayed limited. Relative to equivalent monopolar designs, the bipolar construction raises specific power and power density, and the batteries remain compatible with existing lead recycling streams.

== Nickel–metal hydride batteries ==
In 2021 Toyota began volume production of bipolar nickel–metal hydride batteries for hybrid vehicles, developed together with Toyota Industries. The second-generation Toyota Aqua, launched on 19 July 2021, was described by Toyota as the world's first vehicle to use a high-output bipolar nickel-hydrogen battery as an electric drive battery. Toyota stated that the battery realized approximately twice the output of the unit in the previous-generation Aqua, with a simpler structure, fewer parts and a more compact form that allowed more cells in the same volume. Bipolar nickel–metal hydride batteries were also used in the Toyota Crown hybrid.

== Lithium-ion batteries ==
In 2023 Toyota announced plans to extend the bipolar architecture to lithium-ion batteries for battery electric vehicles. A 'popular' version using a lithium iron phosphate cathode, planned for production in 2026–2027, was presented with a projected 20% increase in cruising range over the bZ4X, a 40% cost reduction and recharging from 10% to 80% in 30 minutes or less, in combination with vehicle-level improvements. A 'performance' version combining the bipolar structure with a high-nickel cathode was planned for 2027–2028.
