= Toyota Prius C =

Toyota Prius c (NHP10)
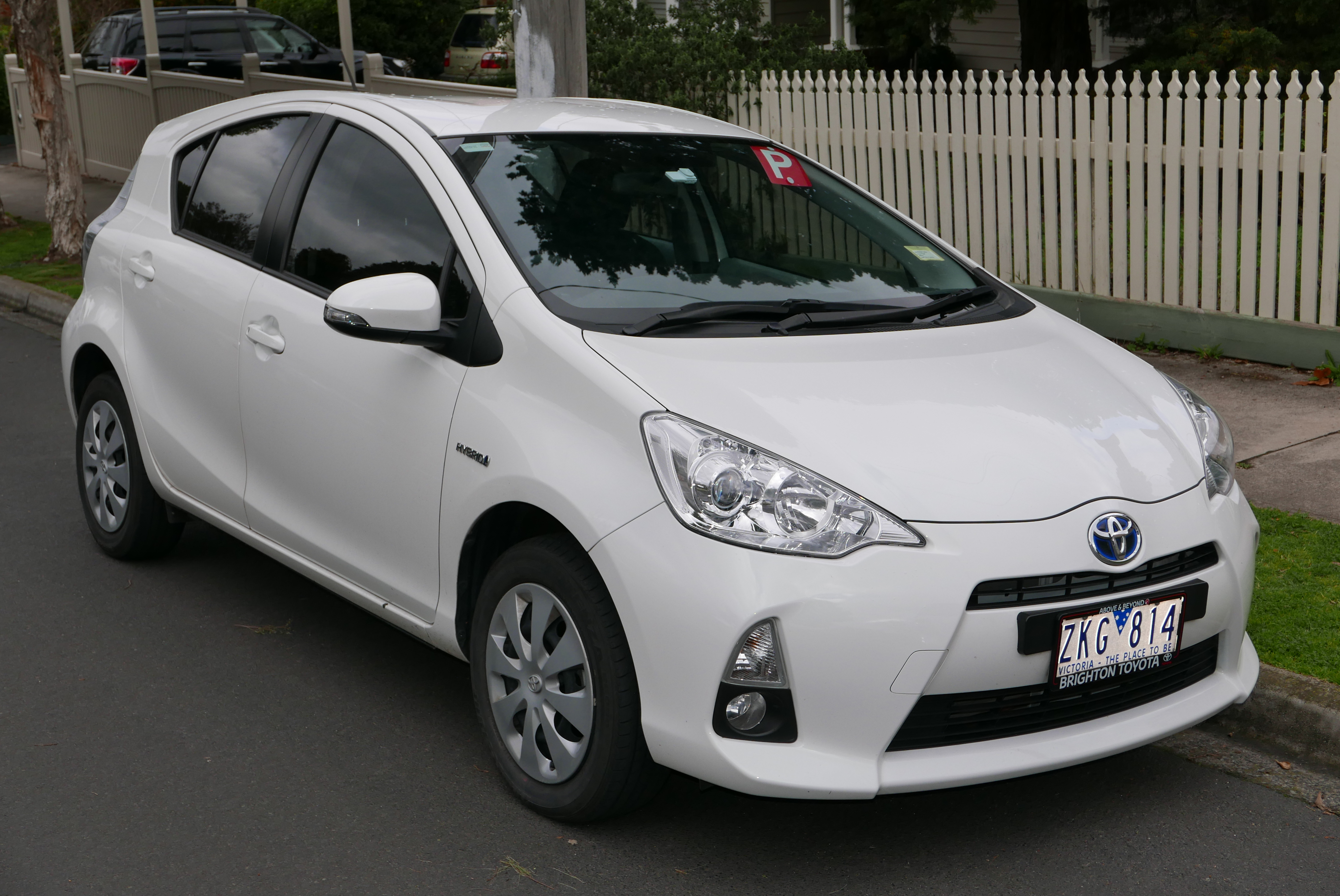
- Pre-facelift Toyota Prius c (Australia)

Overview
- Manufacturer: Toyota
- Also called: Toyota Aqua (Japan)
- Production: December 2011 – 2021
- Model years: 2012–2019 (US)
- Assembly: Japan: Kanegasaki, Iwate (Kanto Auto Works, until 2012); Ōhira, Miyagi (TMEJ, 2012–2021)

Body and chassis
- Class: Subcompact car (B)
- Body style: 5-door hatchback
- Layout: Front-engine, front-wheel drive
- Platform: Toyota B platform
- Related: Toyota Vitz (XP130)

Powertrain
- Engine: Hybrid Synergy Drive; Gasoline engine: 1.5-liter DOHC 16–valve 1NZ-FXE I4 VVT-i (Atkinson cycle)
- Transmission: CVT
- Hybrid drivetrain: Power-split
- Battery: 0.9 kWh nickel–metal hydride

Dimensions
- Wheelbase: 2,550 mm (100.4 in)
- Length: 3,995–4,060 mm (157.3–159.8 in)
- Width: 1,695 mm (66.7 in); 1,715 mm (67.5 in) (Prius c second facelift/Aqua Crossover)
- Height: 1,445 mm (56.9 in)
- Curb weight: 1,100–1,140 kg (2,425.1–2,513.3 lb)

Chronology
- Successor: Toyota Aqua (XP210) (Japan); Toyota Yaris Hybrid (XP210) (Australasia); Toyota Corolla Hybrid (E210) (USA/Canada)

The Toyota Prius c (c stands for "city"), also known as the Toyota Aqua (Japanese: トヨタ・アクア, Hepburn: Toyota Akua); "aqua" is Latin for water) in Japan, is a full hybrid gasoline-electric subcompact/supermini hatchback manufactured and marketed by Toyota. The Prius c is the third member of the Prius family, and combines the features of a Yaris-sized car with a hybrid powertrain. The Prius c is priced lower than the conventional Prius and has a higher fuel economy in city driving under United States Environmental Protection Agency test cycles. The Prius c was ranked by the EPA as the 2012 most fuel efficient compact car when plug-in electric vehicles are excluded.

Toyota presented the production version of the Aqua at the 2011 Tokyo Motor Show; presented the U.S. Prius c at the January 2012 North American International Auto Show in Detroit, and launched the Aqua in Japan in December 2011 at a price of ¥1.69 million (US$21,700). Sales in several Asian markets began in January 2012. The Prius c was released in the U.S. and Canada in March 2012. Sales in Australia and New Zealand began in April 2012.

The Aqua is considered the most successful nameplate launch in Japan in the last 20 years. As of January 2017, the Aqua/Prius c is the second most sold hybrid of Toyota after the regular Prius, with 1,380,100 units sold worldwide. Japan as the market leader with 1,154,500 units sold through January 2017. The Aqua was the top selling new car in Japan for three years in a row, from 2013 to 2015.

The Prius C was discontinued in North America at the end of the 2019 model year. It was also discontinued in Australia in early 2020.

== Prius c Concept ==
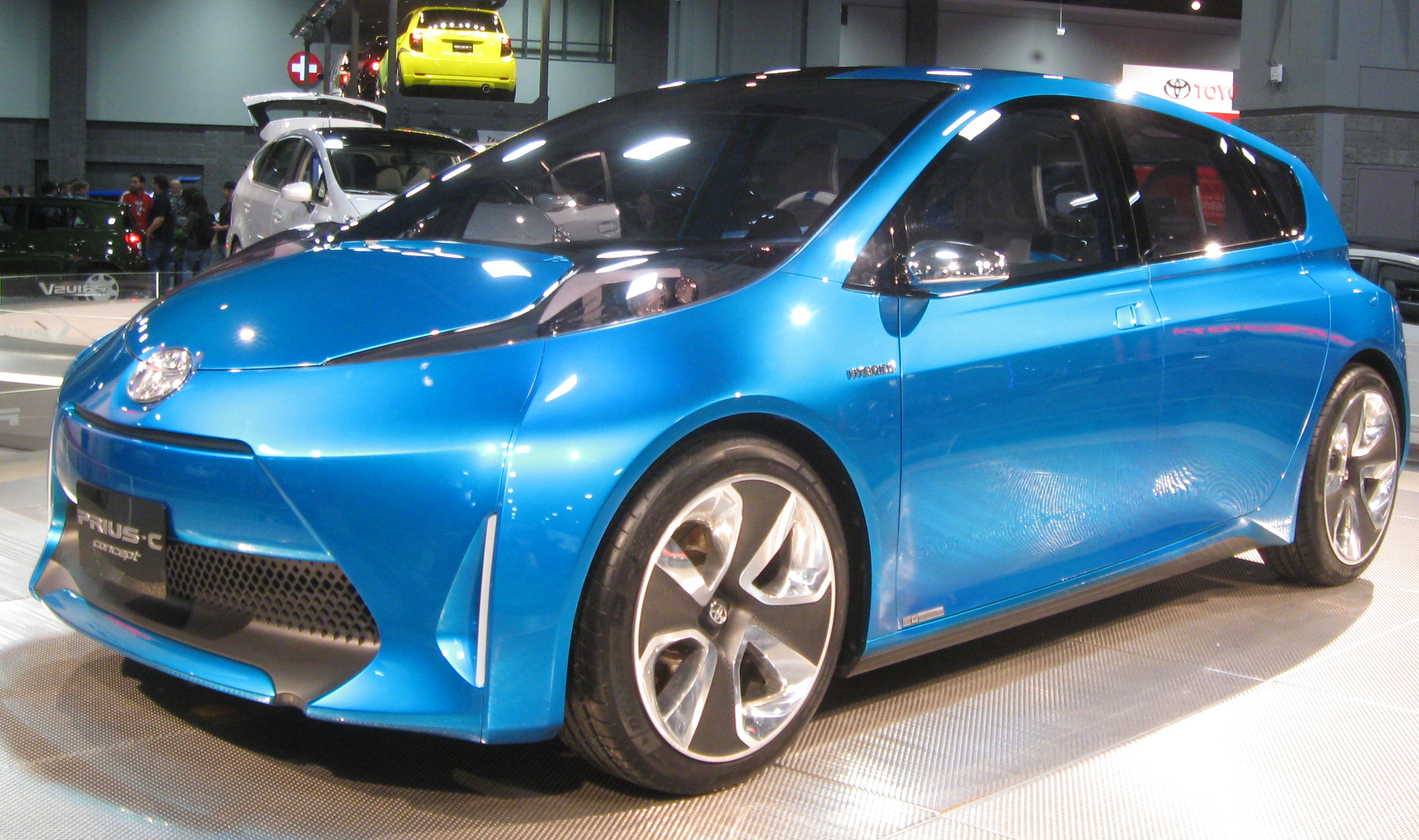
Prius c concept exhibited at the 2011 Washington Auto Show

The Toyota Prius c concept car was unveiled at the January 2011 North American International Auto Show in Detroit. The design takes cues from the Toyota FT-CH concept vehicle that was shown at the same event in 2010. Toyota explained that the 'c' in 'Prius c' stands for "city"-centric vehicle as it is smaller than the standard Prius and aimed at younger buyers without families who require less cargo space in the rear and fewer of the luxury touches (although passenger space remains essentially the same as a standard Prius). This results in a higher EPA MPG-City Rating than the standard Prius and easier parking in tight spaces.

Together with the introduction of the production version of the Toyota Aqua at the 2011 Tokyo Motor Show, the carmaker also exhibited two other Aqua concepts, the Aqua Kiriri version and the Aqua Piriri.

== Specifications ==
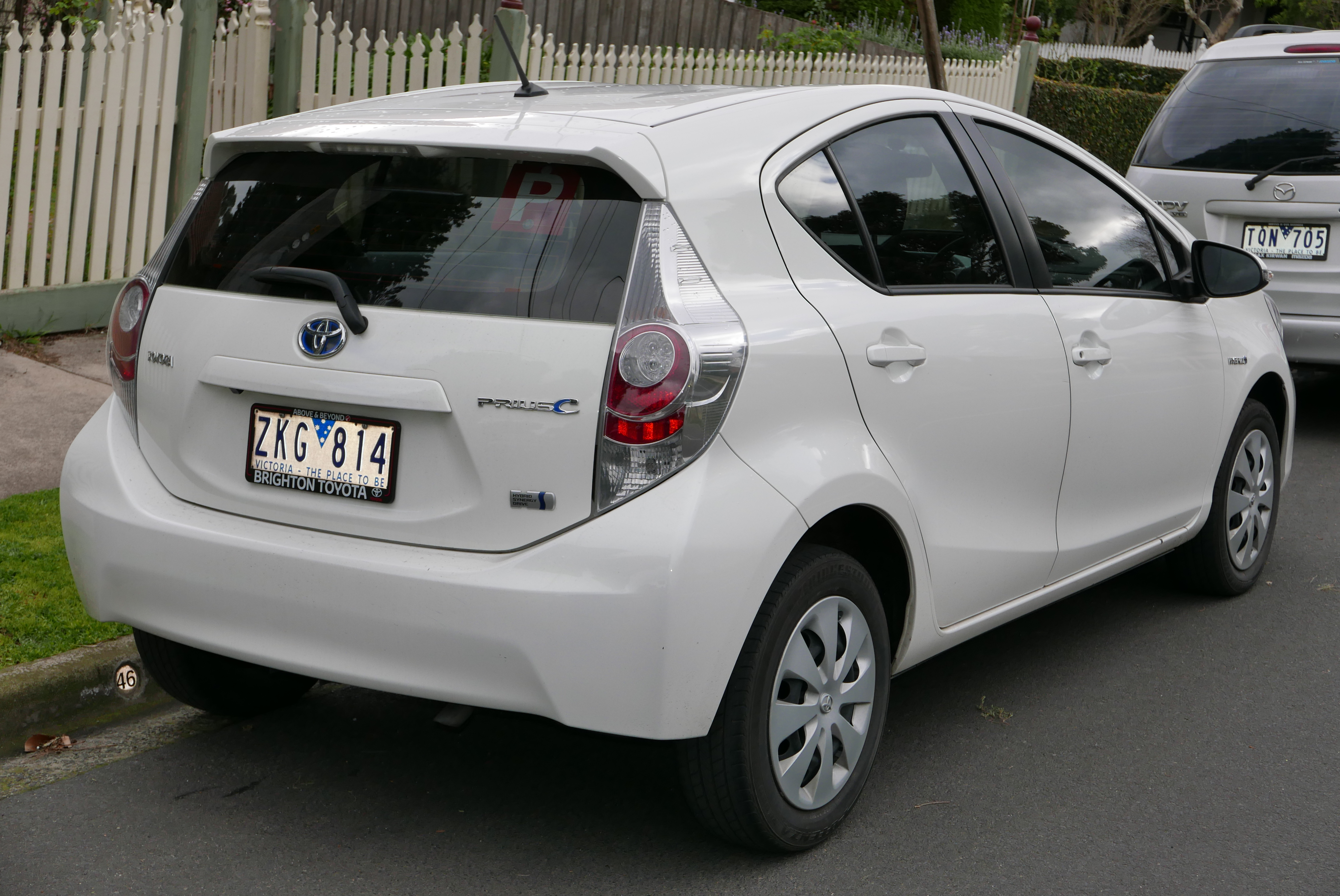
Pre-facelift Prius c (Australia)

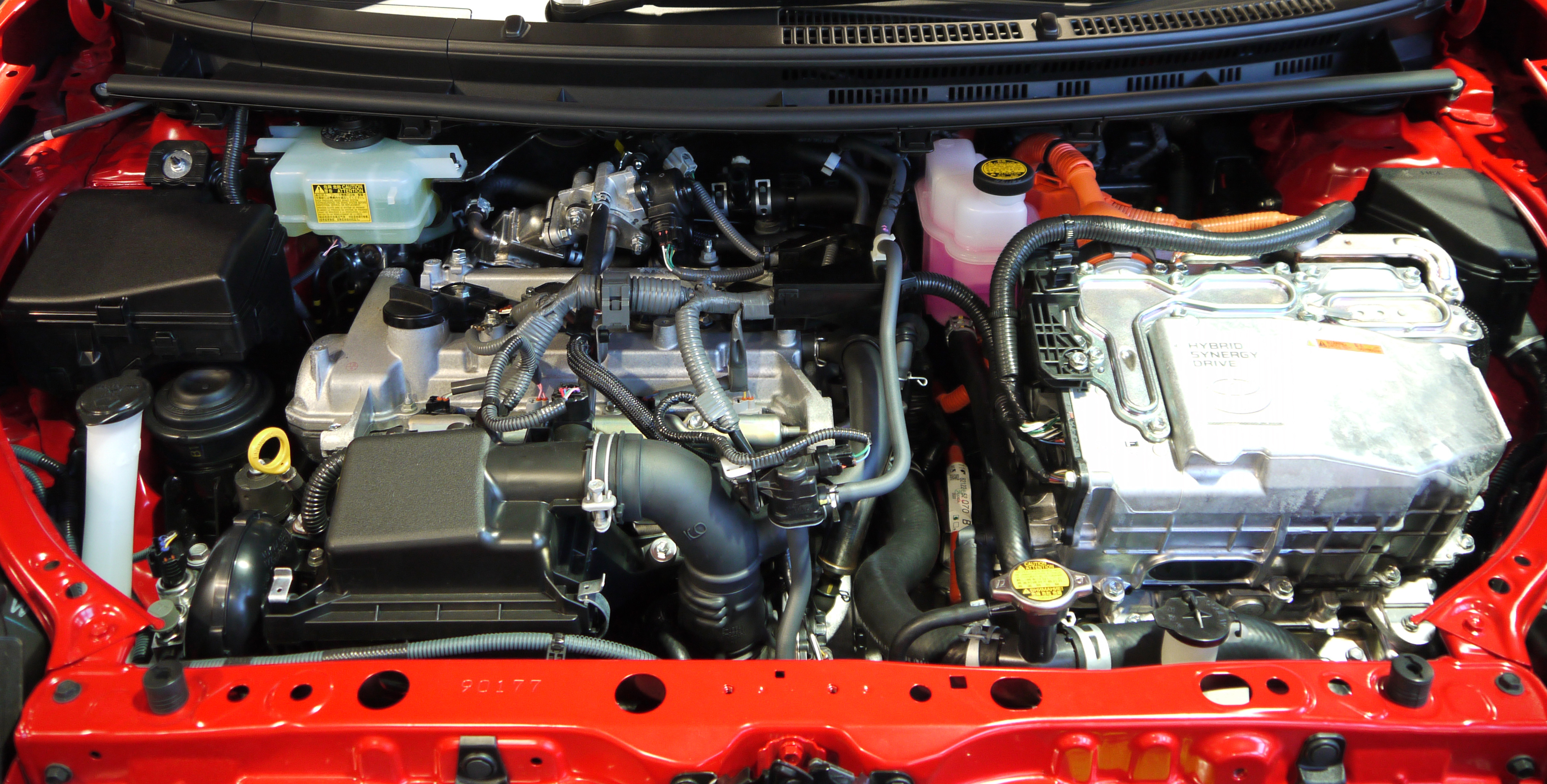
Hybrid Synergy Drive of Toyota Aqua (Prius c)

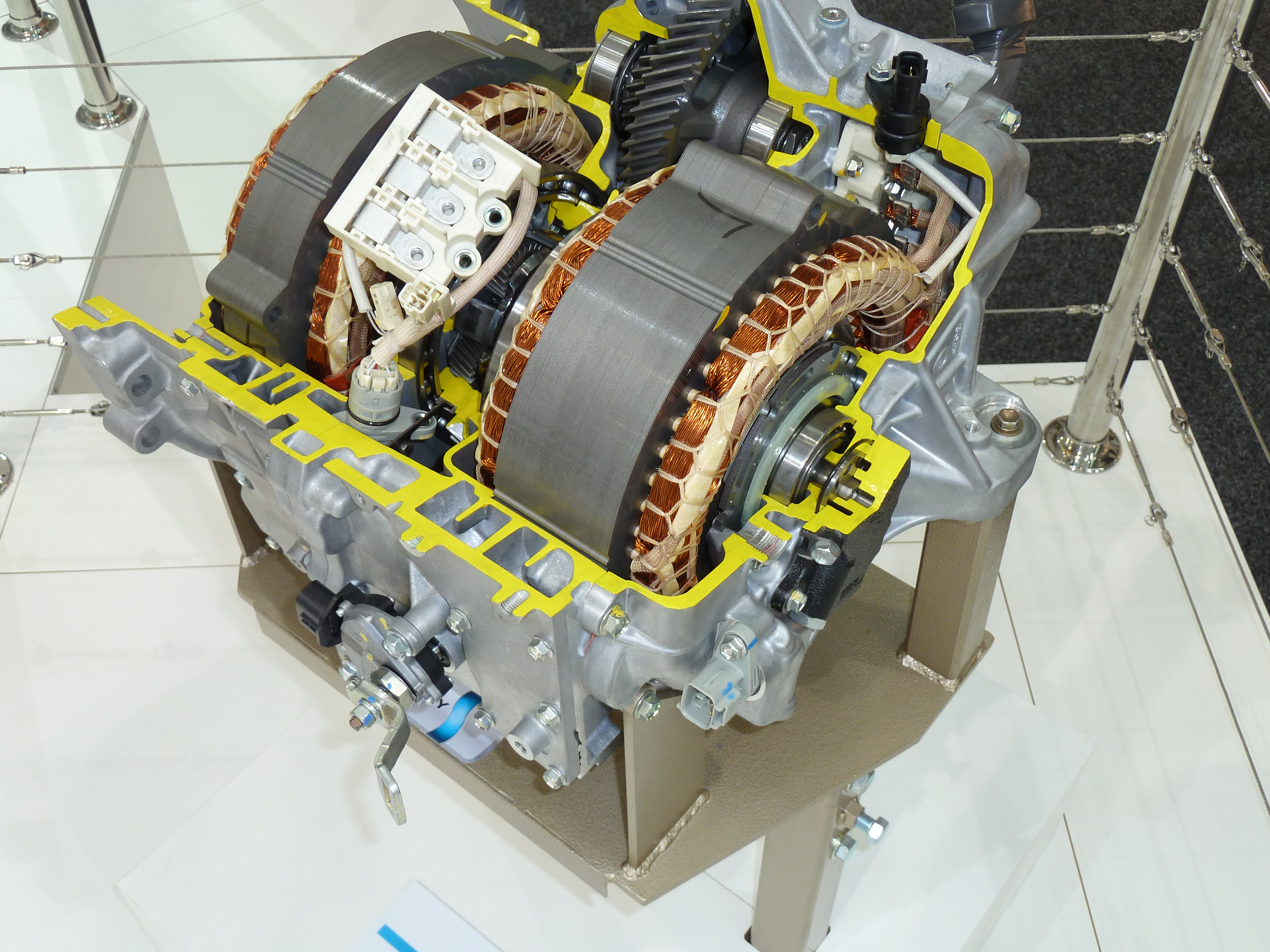
Generation 3 (chainless) Hybrid Synergy Drive. The ICE-MG1 Power Split Device/MG2 Motor Speed Reduction Device HSD is shown in a sectioned and highlighted view.

Built on an enhanced and streamlined Yaris-inspired platform, the Prius c features Toyota's Generation 3 Hybrid Synergy Drive with a 1.5-liter DOHC four-cylinder, 16–valve with VVT-i gasoline engine, the same engine model and displacement as on the earliest Priuses, but is now "beltless". The air conditioner is a self-contained unit containing a motor & compressor powered by the 144-volt traction battery, and the 12-volt battery is charged via a DC-DC converter also powered by the traction battery.

Unlike earlier Prius HSDs, the Prius c incorporates separate planetary gear reduction paths for the ICE/MG (internal combustion engine/motor-generator) one, now better matched to their respective mission functions, in a significantly smaller, lighter weight package. The chain drive found in the Gen 1 and Gen 2 HSDs is also eliminated, replaced by helical gears in the Gen 3 HSD. The MG2 ratio is 2.5:1 rather than 1:1 as on earlier HSDs, thereby allowing the physical size of the MG2 to be reduced to the cross-section of the MG1. The Prius v and Prius Plug-in share this basic Gen 3 design (P410 transaxle, for both of these), but not its specific implementation, and which is unique to the Prius c and its lower maximum weight, and lower HSD net horsepower (P510 transaxle, for Prius c, North America; Prius Aqua, Japan; and Yaris Hybrid, Europe).

The hybrid system includes a new high-voltage battery and inverter, and a smaller auxiliary 12 volt battery. Both batteries are located under the rear passenger seat, are easily accessible for service, and are protected from collision impact by a welded tubular steel cage which also supports the rear seat. Situated under the passenger seat, the large high voltage traction battery preserves trunk space, unlike the traction battery on earlier Priuses, and significantly lowers the center of gravity, improving handling.

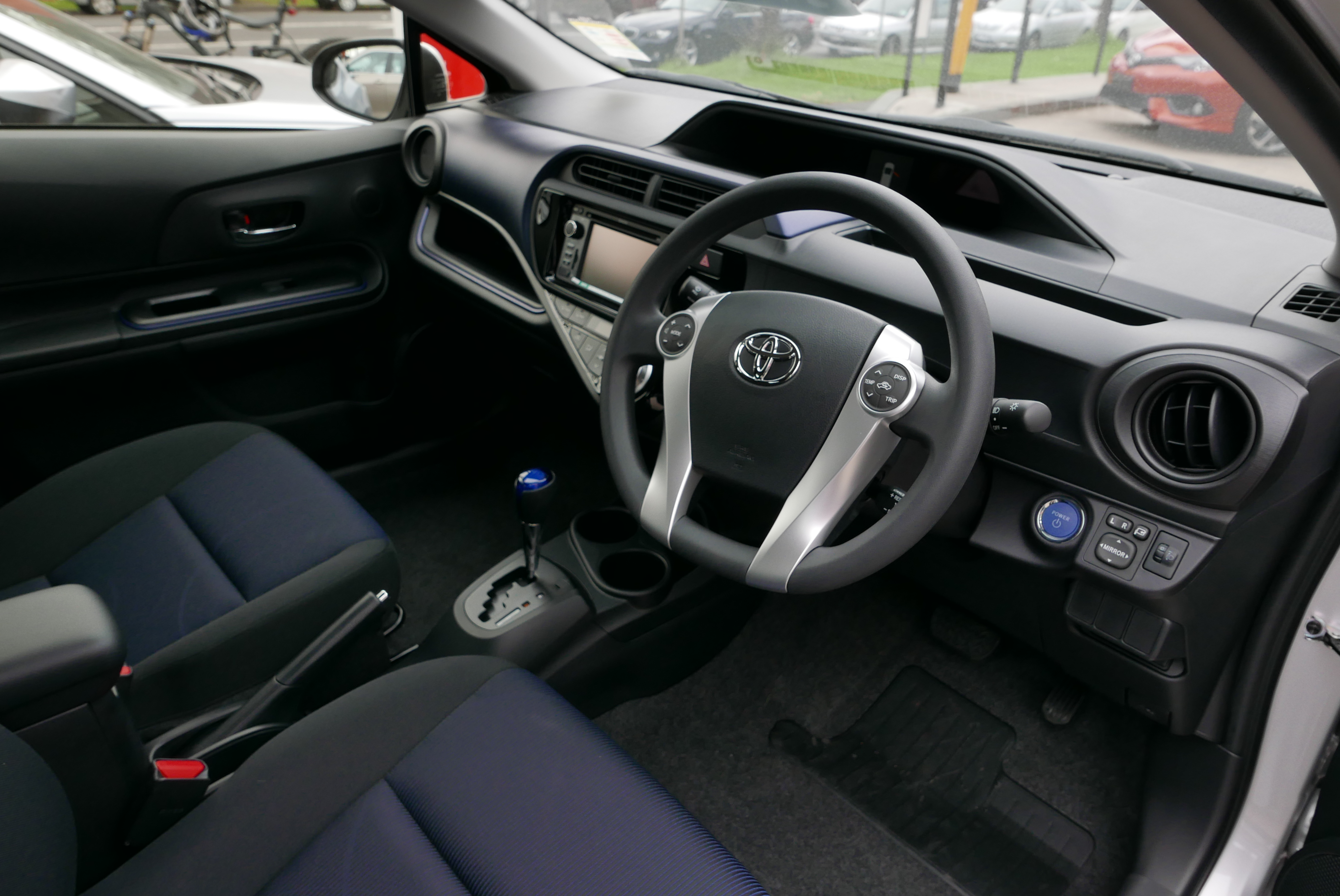
Interior

The hybrid powertrain weighs around 40 kg (88 lb) less than that of the standard Prius Liftback. The 1NZ-FXE engine produces 54 kW (73 hp) and the HSD motor is rated at 45 kW (60 hp). Total output is rated at 74 kW (99 hp).

Compared to the standard Prius Liftback, the 2,550 mm (100.4 in) wheelbase of the Prius C is 150 mm (5.9 in) shorter, and an overall length of 4,000 mm (157.3 in) is 490 mm (19.1 in) shorter. This places the Prius c in the American subcompact class. Japanese versions are also compliant with Japanese government dimension regulations which reduce tax liability (the regular Prius had exceeded it since the second generation). The use of a 1.5 litre engine also reduces the annual Japanese Government road tax obligation.

Two optional driving modes are offered: "EV Mode enables electric driving for up to one mile. ECO Mode limits the operation of the climate control and adjusts throttle input to help maximize fuel economy".

== Fuel economy and emissions ==
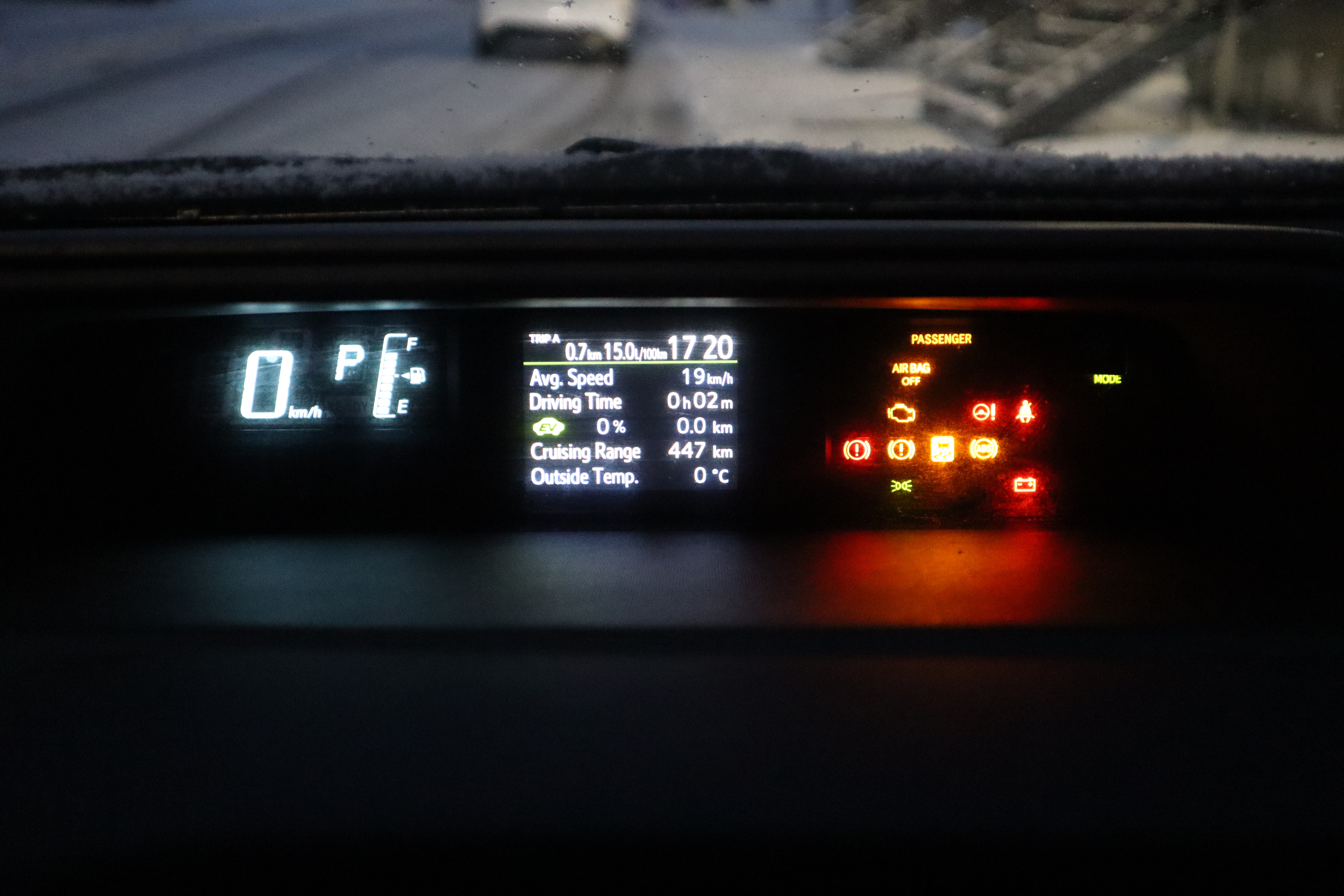
Dashboard of a Canadian Prius c

Under the United States Environmental Protection Agency test cycles, the 2017 Prius c is rated at 48 mpg_{‑US} (4.9 L/100 km; 58 mpg_{‑imp}) city and 43 mpg_{‑US} (5.5 L/100 km; 52 mpg_{‑imp}) highway, for a combined fuel economy of 46 mpg_{‑US} (5.1 L/100 km; 55 mpg_{‑imp}). The Prius c emission certification is SULEV.

The Prius c was ranked by the EPA as the 2012 model year most fuel efficient compact car excluding plug-in electric vehicles. When electric-powered cars are considered, the Chevrolet Volt ranks on top of the compact car category, followed by the Prius c.

== Production ==
The Prius c is assembled at the Iwate Plant of Toyota Motor East Japan, Inc., a wholly owned subsidiary of Toyota Motor Corporation, in Kanegasaki, Iwate in northern Japan. Toyota's initial production capacity for the Aqua/Prius c at this facility was 12,000 units per month, with a maximum production capacity of 30,000 units per month.

=== Facelift updates ===
The first facelift of the Prius c was presented at the November 2014 Los Angeles Auto Show. The facelifted model has a revised front bumper and headlights similar to the GT86. The tail lights are also modified, now incorporating black plastic segments towards the leading edge. The interior features metallic open/close AC vents, as well as a redesigned climate control cluster and an updated, digital speedometer interface design.

A second facelift of the Prius c was released in 2017 with subtle changes, including reshaping of the bonnet, re-sculpted bumpers, redesigned LED c-shaped tail lamps, and revised wheel arches.

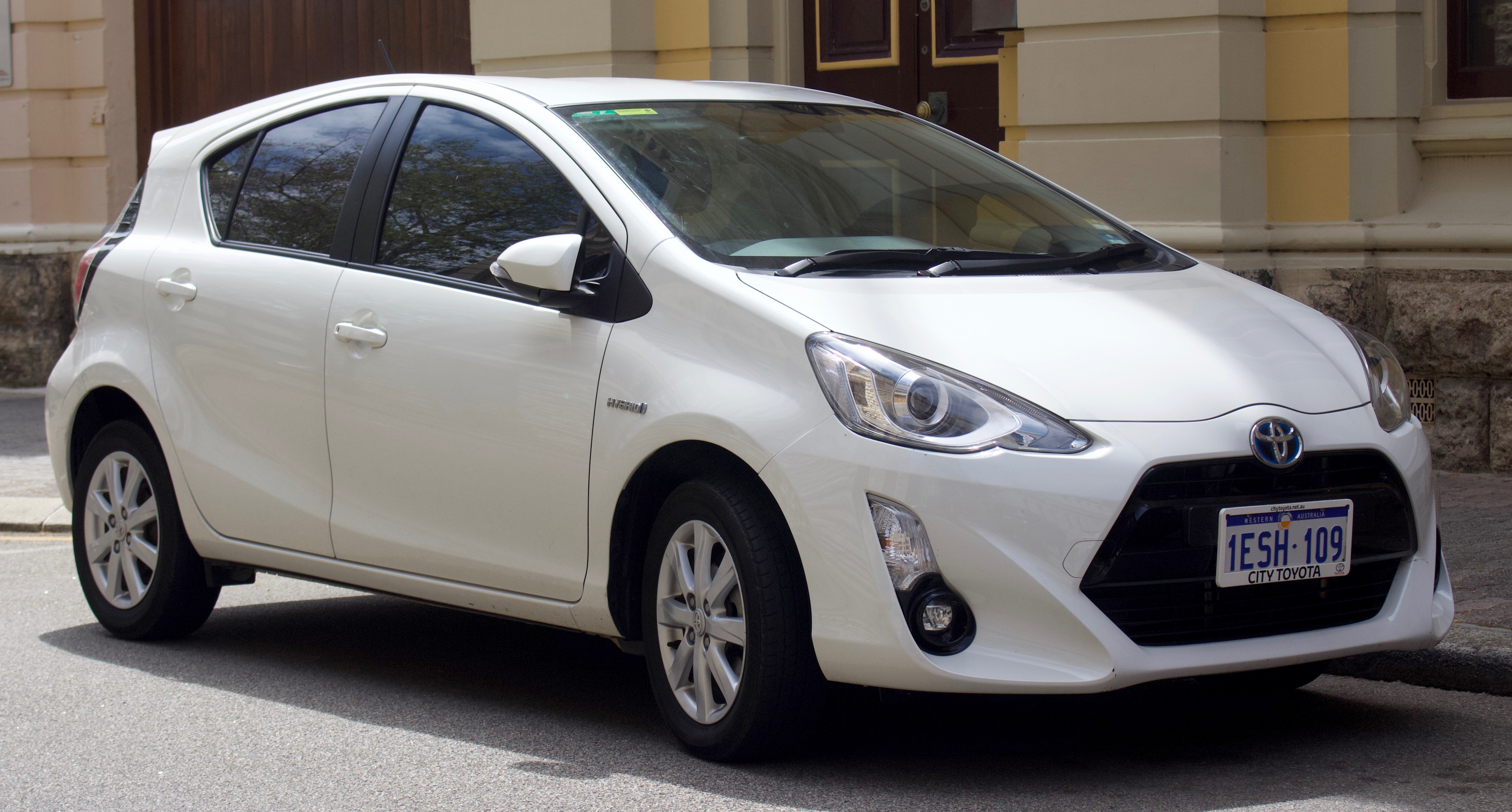
First facelift Prius c i-Tech

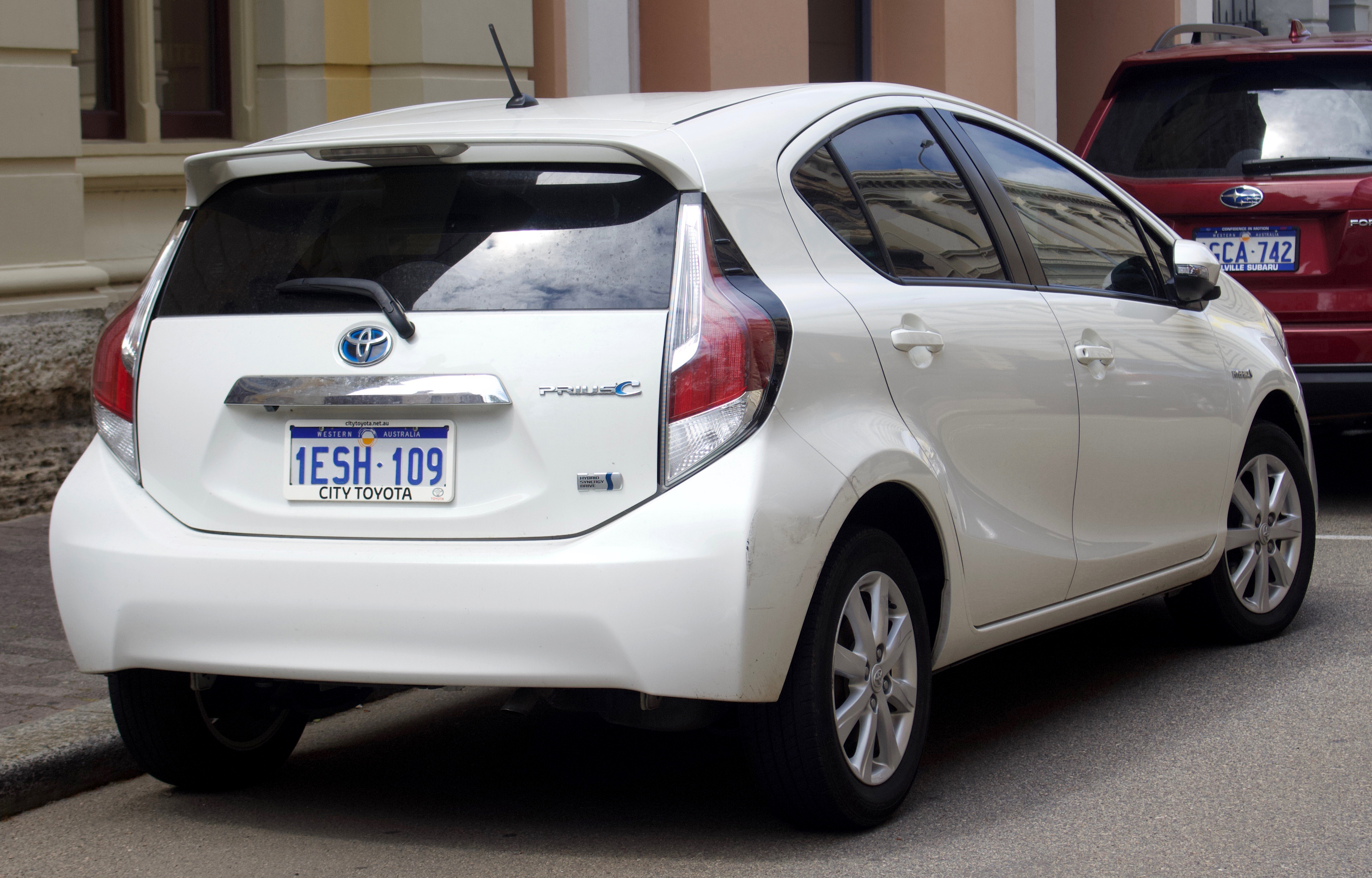
First facelift Prius c i-Tech

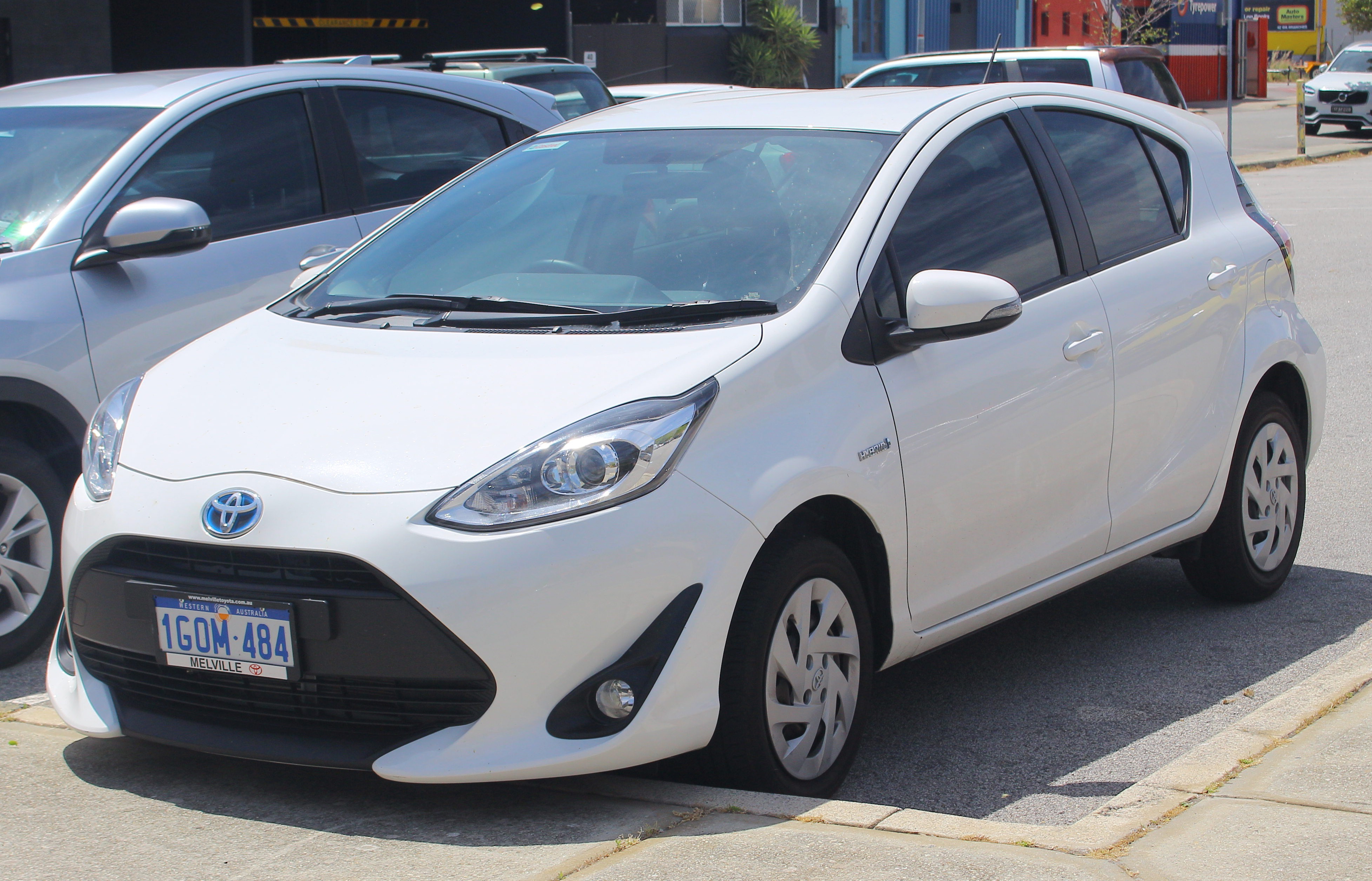
Second facelift Prius c

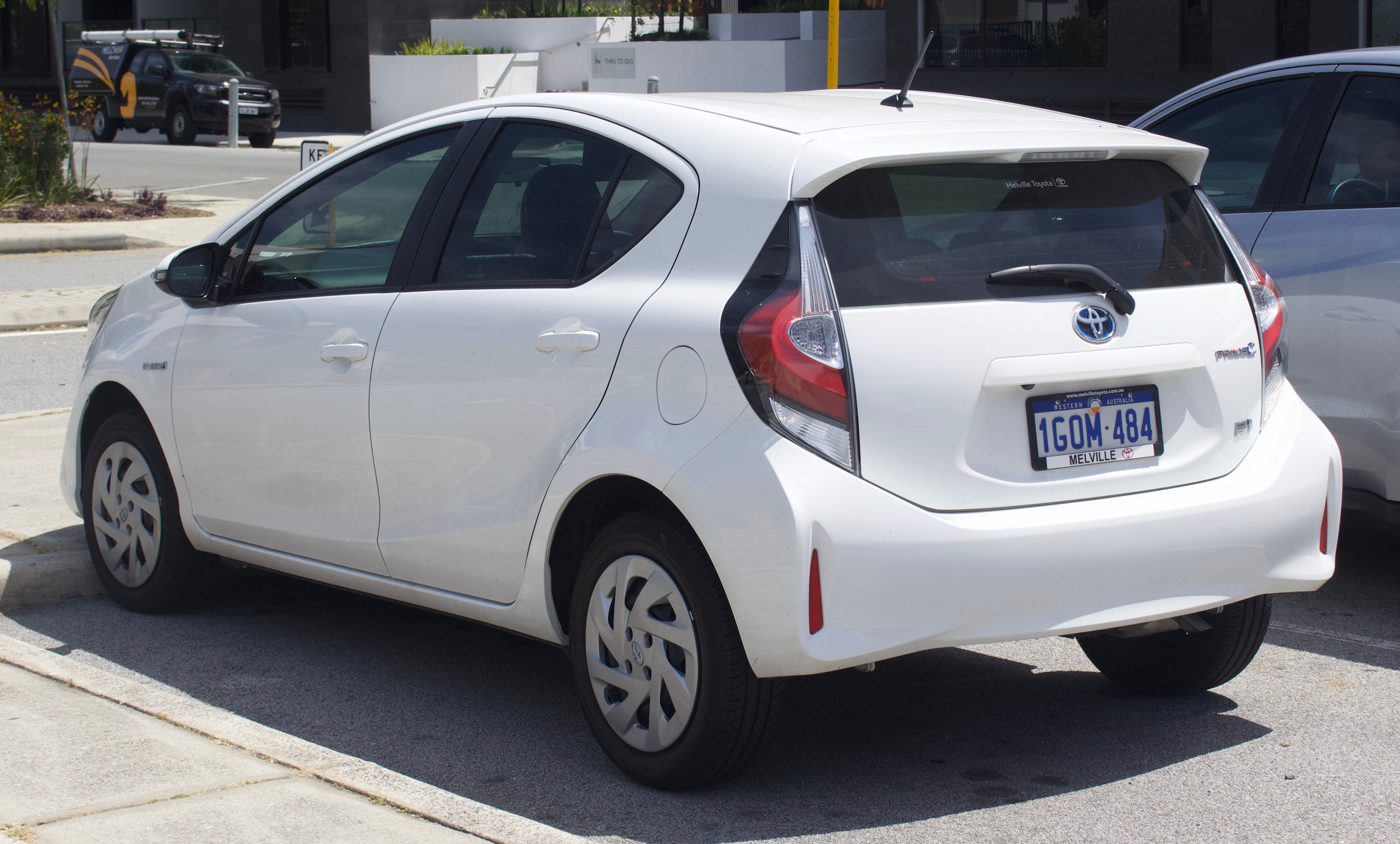
Second facelift Prius c

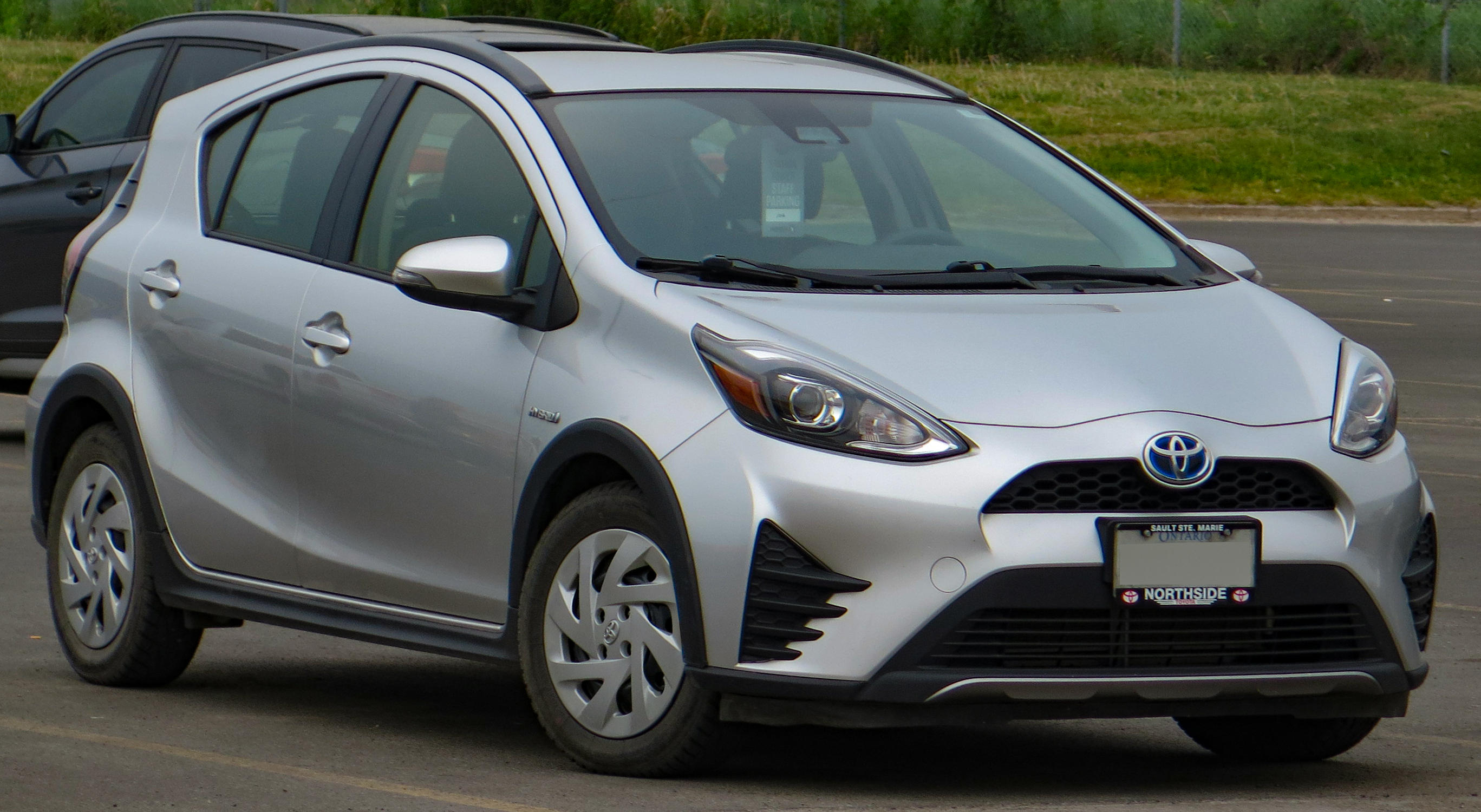
Second facelift Prius c/Aqua Crossover

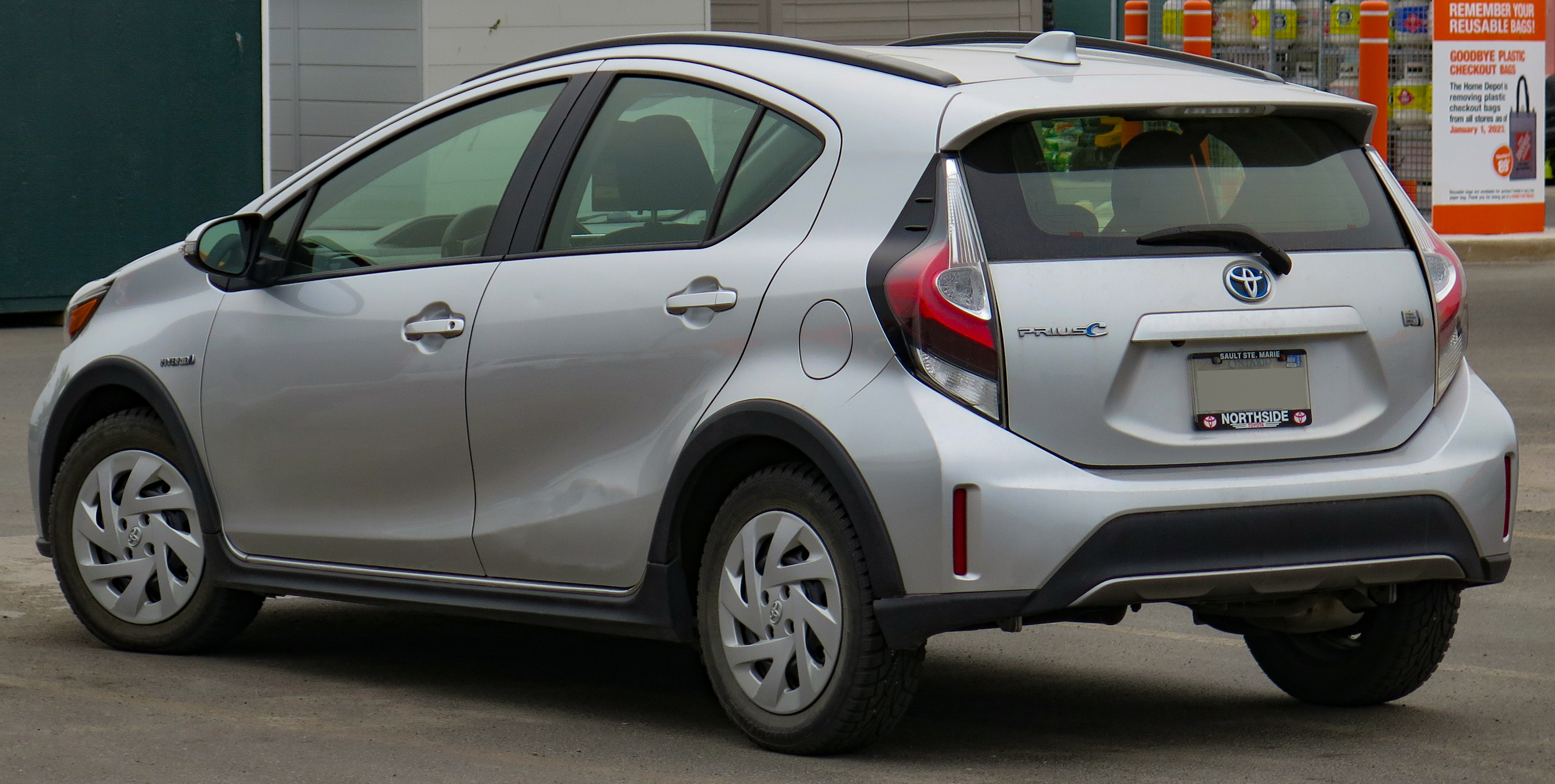
Second facelift Prius c/Aqua Crossover

=== Aqua G's ===
The sportier variant, G's was released in 9 December 2013 after previewed in 43rd Tokyo Motor Show as the prototype car. Based on the "G" trim, the exterior features a redesigned front fascia, side mudguards, rear bumper, fender garnish, gloss black accented LED headlights, rear combination lamps, LED illumination beams, and LED fog lamps. This is the sixth G's series models.

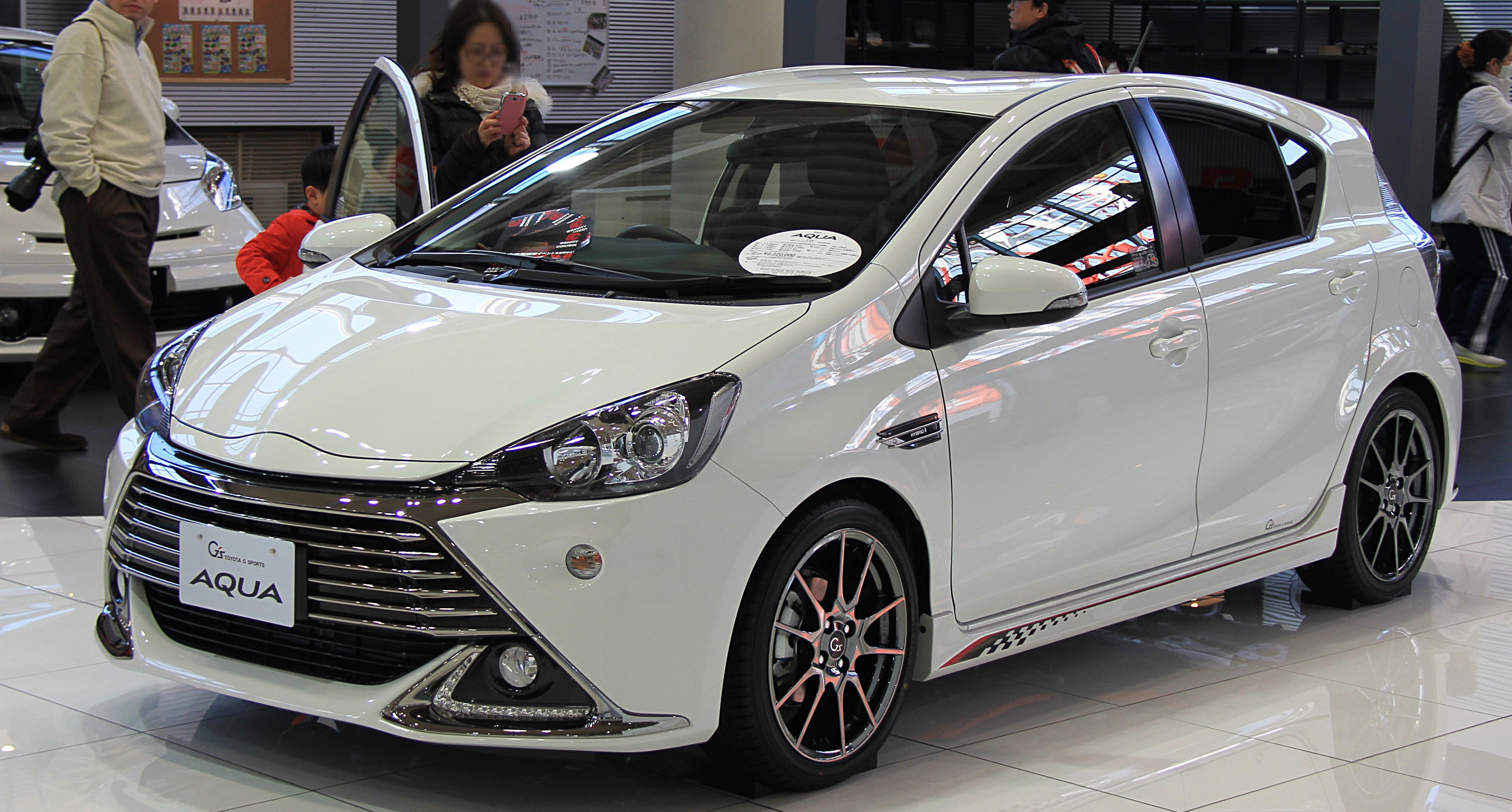
Toyota Aqua G's

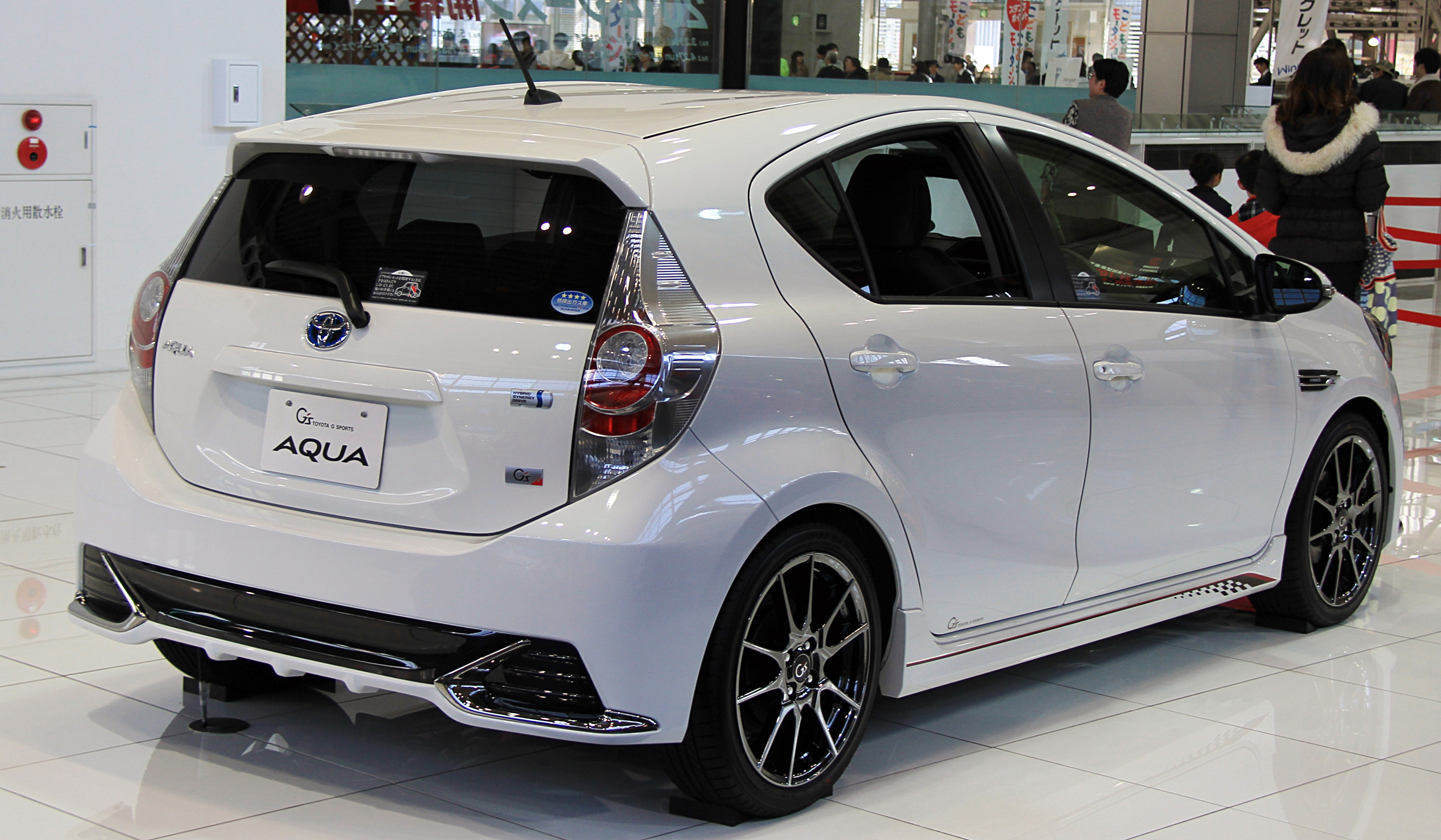
Toyota Aqua G's

=== GR Sport ===
For the Japanese market, Toyota released the Aqua GR Sport in November 2017 as a direct-successor of the Aqua G's. It weighed 1,100 kg (1,110 kg for vehicles with 17-inch tires), was 4,070 mm long, 1,695mm wide, and 1,455 high (1,440 mm for vehicles with 17-inch tires). It also had specially tuned suspension, additional spot welding points, brace addition (vehicles with 17-inch tires only), tachometer (vehicles with 17-inch tires only), aluminum pedals (vehicles with 17-inch tires only), and a leather-wrapped shift knob. Despite external appearances being similar to the GR Yaris, the interior appearance/layout is that of a seocnd facelift Aqua.

In 2020, new 16-inch aluminium wheels were added as an option.

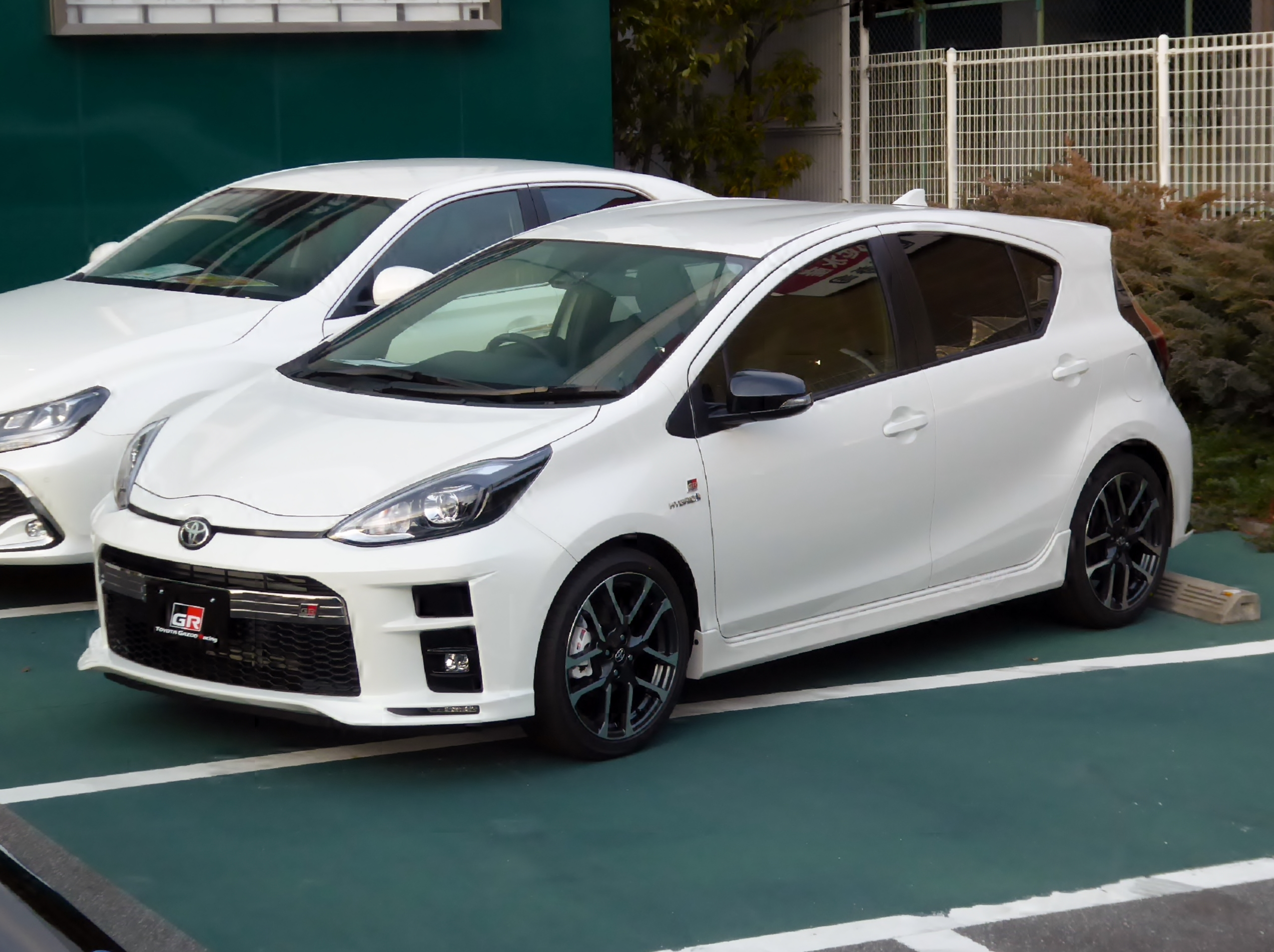
Toyota Aqua G GR Sport

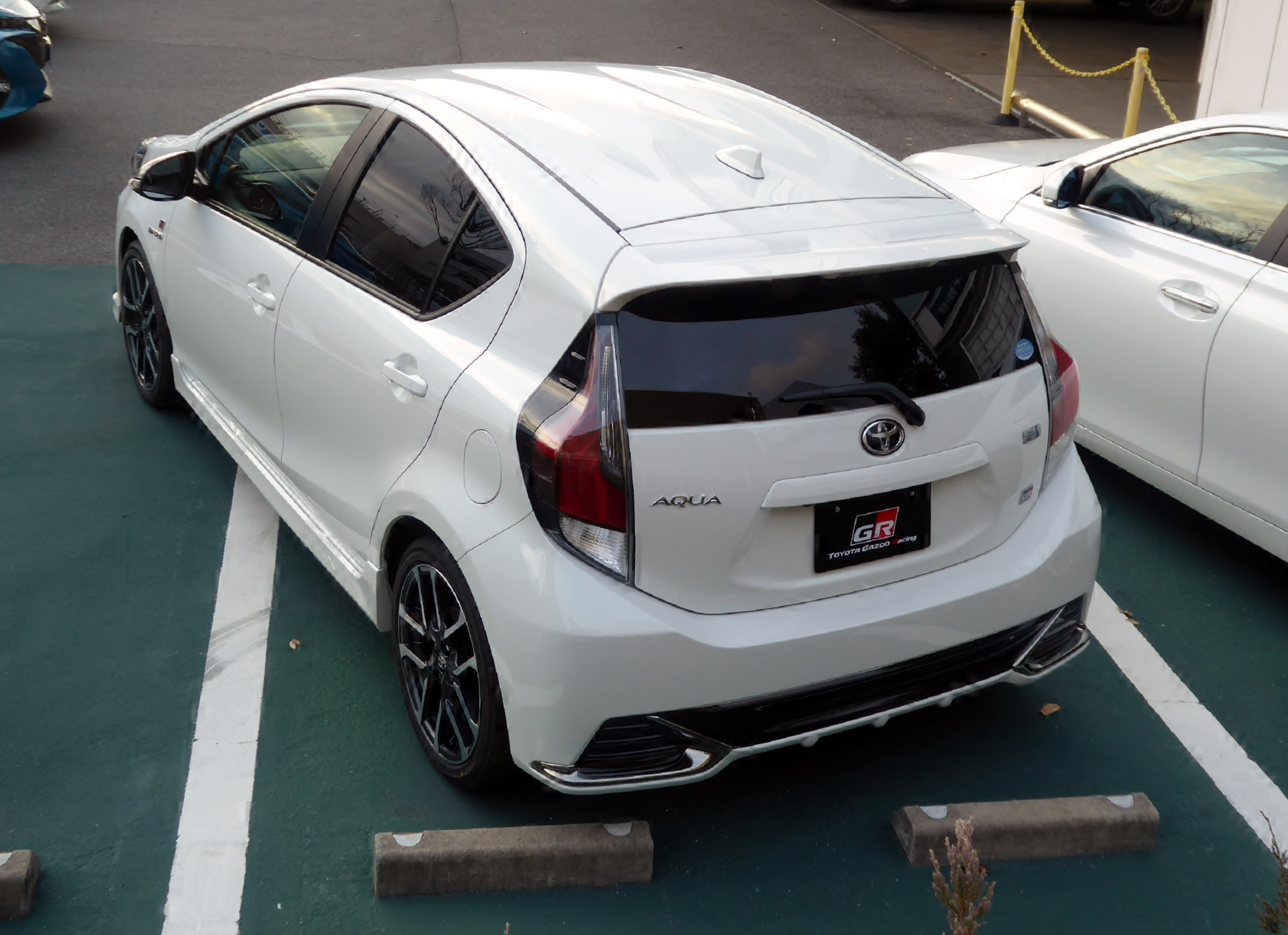
Toyota Aqua G GR Sport rear

=== Persona Series ===
For the American market, the 2016 model year Persona Series was based on the 2016 model year Prius C. The Persona Series comes with a black-on-black color scheme for the exterior paint and alloy wheels. Bright color accents, available in either Electric Lime or Cherry Pearl, adorn the lower front grille, the headlight surrounds, the side mirrors, and the window trim to give a baseball theme. The Persona Series comes standard with keyless entry, automatic climate control, cloth seats, and Bluetooth. Toyota will only sell 1,500 of these special-edition models.

== Safety ==
ANCAP test results* Toyota Prius C (2014)
Test	Score
Overall	5 /5 stars
Frontal offset	14.57/16
Side impact	15.79/16
Pole	2/2
Seat belt reminders	2/3
Whiplash protection	Good
Pedestrian protection	Adequate
Electronic stability control	Standard

== Markets and sales ==
During 2012 a total of 315,406 units were sold worldwide, led by Japan with 266,574 Aquas sold, representing 84.5% of the model global sales. The Prius c is not available in Europe, instead, Toyota is selling the Toyota Yaris Hybrid since June 2012. The Yaris Hybrid shares the same powertrain as the Prius c. Global sales of the Aqua/Prius c passed the 500,000 milestone in August 2013, and the 1 million milestone during the first half of 2015.

As of January 2017, the Aqua/Prius c is the second most sold hybrid of Toyota Motor Corporation after the regular Prius, with 1,380,100 units sold worldwide. The market leader is Japan with 1,154,500 units sold, capturing 83.6% of global sales. Ranking second is the U.S. with 177,218 units sold through December 2016, and Canada with 11,879 through April 2016. A total of 31,000 units have been sold in the rest of the world through April 2016. For three years running, 2013 through 2015, the Aqua was the top selling new car in Japan. The Aqua is considered the most successful nameplate launch in Japan in the last 20 years.

The following table presents retail sales since deliveries of the Aqua began in December 2011 for the top selling national markets by year through April 2016.

Toyota Aqua/Prius sales by top national markets between 2011 and 2020
Country	Total	2020	2019	2018	2017	2016	2015	2014	2013	2012	2011
Japan	1,567,769	59,548	103,803	126,561	131,615	168,203	215,525	233,212	262,367	266,574	361
United States	199,300	(1)	1,268	8,399	12,415	20,452	38,484	40,570	41,979	35,733	0
Canada	20,077	(1)	1,480	2,026	2,285	3,135	3,029	2,776	2,816	2,530	0
Australia	8,662	83	415	518	737	903	1,227	1,654	1,242	1,883	0
Total top markets	1,795,725	59,631	106,966	137,504	147,052	192,693	258,265	278,212	308,404	306,720	361
Global sales	1,860,000+	N/A	N/A	N/A	N/A	N/A	260,572	281,867	317,891	315,406	361
Notes: (1) Discontinued.

=== Japan ===
The Aqua was launched on 26 December 2011 and is available at all Japanese Toyota networks Toyota Store, Toyopet Store, Corolla Store and Toyota Netz. Initially, it was offered in 3 variants: G, S, and L. The Welcab variant also available. Toyota initially established a sales target of 12,000 units per month, but before its market launch, Toyota had received orders for 60,000 Aquas, creating a four-month waiting list for deliveries.

By 31 January 2012, the number of orders grew to 120,000. The Aqua was the third top selling new car in the Japanese market in February and March 2012, and ranked second from April through September, surpassed only by the combined sales of the regular Prius and Prius α (pronounced as the Alpha), as Toyota is reporting sales of both models together. The Aqua ranked as the top selling new car in Japan in October 2012, surpassing combined sales of the regular Prius and the Prius α, which ranked second, and ending the Prius brand record of being the top selling new car in Japan for 16 months in a row. The Aqua kept the top selling spot through December 2012, and with 266,567 units sold in 2012, the Aqua ranked as the second best selling car that year after the Prius brand. When sales of these two Prius models are broken down, the Toyota Aqua ranks as the top selling model in Japan, including kei cars, and the Aqua led monthly sales since February through December 2012.

The Aqua continued as the top selling car in Japan during every month of the first quarter of 2013, and after ranking second behind the Toyota Prius during the second quarter, the Aqua was again the top selling car in Japan during the third quarter of 2013. A total of 262,367 Aquas were sold in 2013, down 1.6% from 2012, but nevertheless, the Aqua topped new car sales in Japan in 2013, including kei car sales. With 233,212 units sold during 2014, down 11.1% from 2013, the Aqua was the top selling new car in Japan for the second consecutive year. Again in 2015, with 215,525 units sold, down 7.6% from 2014, the Aqua ranked as the top selling new car in Japan. During the first quarter of 2016, the Prius liftback surpassed the Aqua as the best selling new car, and ended 2016 as the second best-selling new car with 168,208 units sold.

Since its introduction, a total of 1,154,500 units have been sold in Japan through January 2017, representing 83.6% of the model global sales. In addition of being the best-selling new car in Japan for three consecutive years, 2013 through 2015, the Toyota Aqua is considered the most successful nameplate launch in the Japanese market of the last 20 years.

=== United States ===
Sales of the Prius c began in the U.S. in March 2012, at a price starting at US$18,950 plus a US$760 destination charge. After three days in the American market, the carmaker announced that the Prius c became "one of Toyota's fastest-selling vehicles." During its first month in the market, the Prius c sold 4,875 units, accounting for 17.0% of the Prius family sales in the U.S. A total of 35,733 units were sold during 2012, and the Prius c ranked as the fourth best selling hybrid car in the U.S that year. During 2013 a total of 41,979 units were sold, allowing the Prius c to rank as the third top selling hybrid car during that year, behind the Prius liftback and the Camry Hybrid sedan. During the first nine months of 2014 Prius c sales were down by 4.7% as compared with the same period in 2013, following the same declining trend as the overall hybrid segment in the American market. As of December 2016, a total of 177,218 units have been sold since its introduction in March 2012.

The Prius c is offered in four trims named Prius c One through Prius c Four. The basic level Prius c One includes power windows and door locks, automatic climate control, Multi-Information Display (MID), Hill Start Assist Control (HAC), Remote Keyless Entry, projector-beam halogen headlamps, steering wheel-mounted audio controls, 4-speaker audio, Bluetooth hands-free telephone controls, Bluetooth and USB auxiliary outlets, and rear intermittent window wiper. The Prius c Four, which sells for US$23,230 also includes Softex-trimmed seats, heated front power mirrors with turn signal indicators, alloy wheels, and fog lamps.

For the 2015 model year, the Prius c received a light facelift with alterations to the front and rear lamps and bumpers. Three new bright colors have also been added to the North American lineup.

=== Canada ===
Toyota Canada launched the Prius c in March 2012 with a starting price of CA$20,950 (US$21,100). During its first month in the Canadian market, 328 units were sold and the Prius c represented about 25% of Toyota subcompact sales that month. A total of 556 units were sold in April, its first full month in the market, accounting for 39% of total Prius family sales and 33% of Toyota subcompact sales. A total of 2,530 units were sold during 2012, 2,816 units in 2013, and sales declined to 2,776 in 2014, and recovered to 3,029 in 2015. Since its introduction, a total of 11,876 Prius c hybrids have been sold through April 2016.

=== Australia ===
The Prius c was released in Australia in April 2012 starting at A$23,990 (US$24,426). A second trim with the higher-spec model is called Prius c i-Tech and priced at A$26,990 (US$27,480). A total of 1,883 units were sold during 2012, significantly ahead of Prius v (936 units) and the conventional Prius (861 units). Sales during the first half of 2013 reached 1,242 units, again surpassing Prius v (539 units) and the Prius liftback (277 units). Again in 2014, sales of the Prius c (1,654) topped its siblings Prius v (722) and the third-generation Prius hatch (487). As of April 2016, cumulative sales since introduction totaled 7,432 units.

=== Other countries ===
Excluding the Japanese and North American markets, a total of 25,462 units have been sold in other countries as of September 2014.

Costa Rica

The Prius c was introduced in 2012 at a price starting at US$36,000. As the other electric-drive vehicles sold in the country, the Prius c is subject to lower import duties and local taxes. Since October 2012, Prius c owners are exempted from the driving restriction by license plate number used to control access to downtown San José, the country's capital.

Ecuador

Toyota launched the Prius c in Ecuador in April 2012, with the standard price of US$26,900.

Hong Kong

A total of 358 Prius c were sold during 2012, surpassing combined sales of the conventional Prius (132 units) and the Prius v (113).

Korea (Republic of)

Toyota launched the Prius c in South Korea in March 2018, with the standard price of ₩24,900,000 (US$22,000).

Malaysia

The Prius c was launched in Malaysia in February 2012, where it costs RM97,000 (US$31,750) including insurance.

New Zealand

Sales of the Prius c in New Zealand began in April 2012, starting at a price of NZ$30,990 (US$25,400). Its Japanese domestic market equivalent, the Aqua, is also popular as a used import.

Philippines

Toyota launched the Prius c in the Philippines in January 2012, with the introductory pricing of ₱1,475,000 (US$34,250).

Singapore

The Prius c was launched in Singapore in January 2012, costing about S$115,988 (~US$93,257) for the base trim and about S$118,988 (~US$95,670) for the Snazzy trim with a COE of S$64,209 (~US$51,625) as of March 2013.

Taiwan

Toyota launched the Prius c in Taiwan in March 2012, starting at a price of NT$859,000 (US$29,100).

Uruguay

Toyota first launched the Prius C in Uruguay in 2012, at a price of US$39,900. At this time, the price was too high compared to other vehicles in the market. In consequence of this, it sold less than 10 cars. Six years later, with some tax reductions for hybrid vehicles, Toyota tried again with the 2018 Asian and South American restyling with a new price of US$25,990.

== Recognition ==
- The Prius c was one of the five finalists for the 2013 Green Car of the Year awarded by the Green Car Journal at the 2012 Los Angeles Auto Show.
- In November 2012, Consumer Reports ranked the Prius c as the most reliable 2012 model year vehicle in the United States. The magazine based this later ranking on reliability data obtained through its annual auto survey that covers 1.2 million vehicles owned or leased by subscribers to Consumer Reports. In 2018, they recognized Toyota as the second most reliable automobile manufacturer, and the Prius C as the most reliable vehicle offered by the company. The magazine had previously given a negative review for the Prius c. The magazine had based this earlier ranking on driving tests by its own testers.

== Replacement ==
The Prius C was discontinued in the United States and Canada after the 2019 model year, with the larger E210-series Corolla Hybrid indirectly taking its place. In Australia and New Zealand, it was replaced by the XP210-series Yaris Hybrid since early 2020. In Japan, the Aqua nameplate continues with introduction of the second-generation Aqua in July 2021. The Aqua continued to be sold alongside the related Yaris (formerly Vitz). In Taiwan, the Prius C (both the standard and the crossover variant) was discontinued in March 2021, citing internal competition with the Toyota Corolla Cross.

== See also ==
- Toyota Prius
- Toyota Prius v
- Toyota Prius Plug-in Hybrid
