= Toyota Aqua =

Full hybrid electric hatchback from Toyota

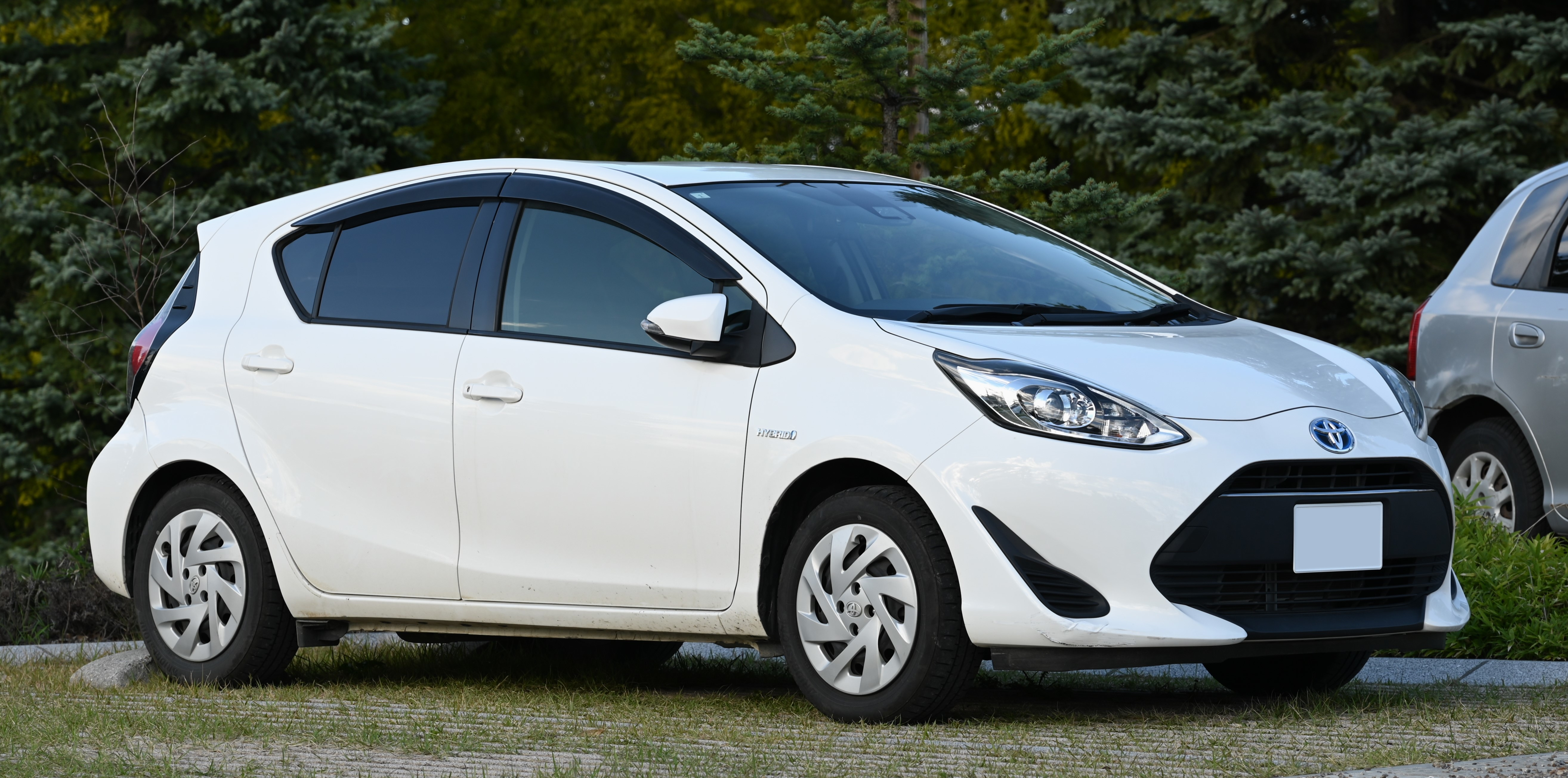
- 2017–2021 Toyota Aqua (NHP10, Japan)

Overview
- Manufacturer: Toyota
- Also called: Toyota Prius c (2011–2021)
- Production: December 2011 – present

Body and chassis
- Class: Subcompact car/Supermini (B)
- Body style: 5-door hatchback

The Toyota Aqua (Japanese: トヨタ・アクア, Hepburn: Toyota Akua) is a full hybrid electric subcompact/supermini hatchback (B-segment) manufactured and marketed by Toyota since 2011. The nameplate is exclusive to the Japanese domestic market, as the vehicle was exported to overseas markets as the Prius c, leveraging the popularity of the Prius hybrid car nameplate and marketed as the smaller alternative to the Prius liftback.

As of January 2017, the Aqua/Prius c is the second highest-selling Toyota hybrid model after the regular Prius, with 1,380,100 units sold worldwide. Japan as Aqua's market leader has sold 1,154,500 units of the model through January 2017. The Aqua was the best-selling (non-kei) car in Japan for three years in a row, from 2013 to 2015.

The name Aqua means 'water' in Latin. The name was meant to associate the car with an "image of clean transparency" and "something that is universally cherished".

== First generation (NHP10; 2011) ==
The production version of the first-generation Aqua was unveiled at the 2011 Tokyo Motor Show. Its design was previously previewed by the Prius c concept car which was unveiled at the January 2011 North American International Auto Show. The Aqua was released on 26 December of the same year.

In 2013, the Aqua was argued by some to be the most successful nameplate launch in Japan in the last 20 years.

The first facelift was announced in 8 December 2014, along with a crossover-inspired variant called the X-URBAN. The second facelift Aqua was announced on 19 June 2017, with the crossover-inspired variant redesigned and renamed as the Aqua Crossover.

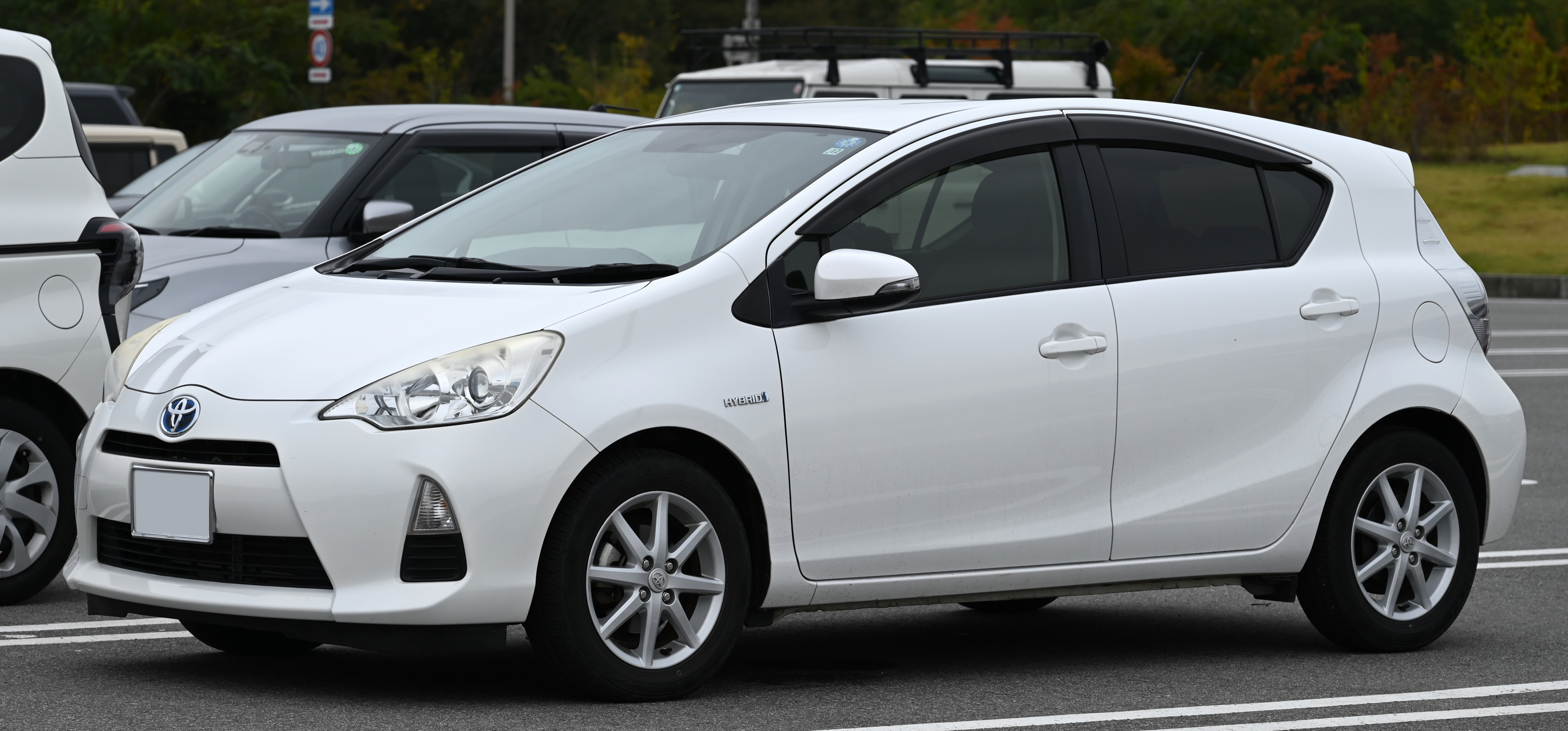
2011 Aqua (pre-facelift)

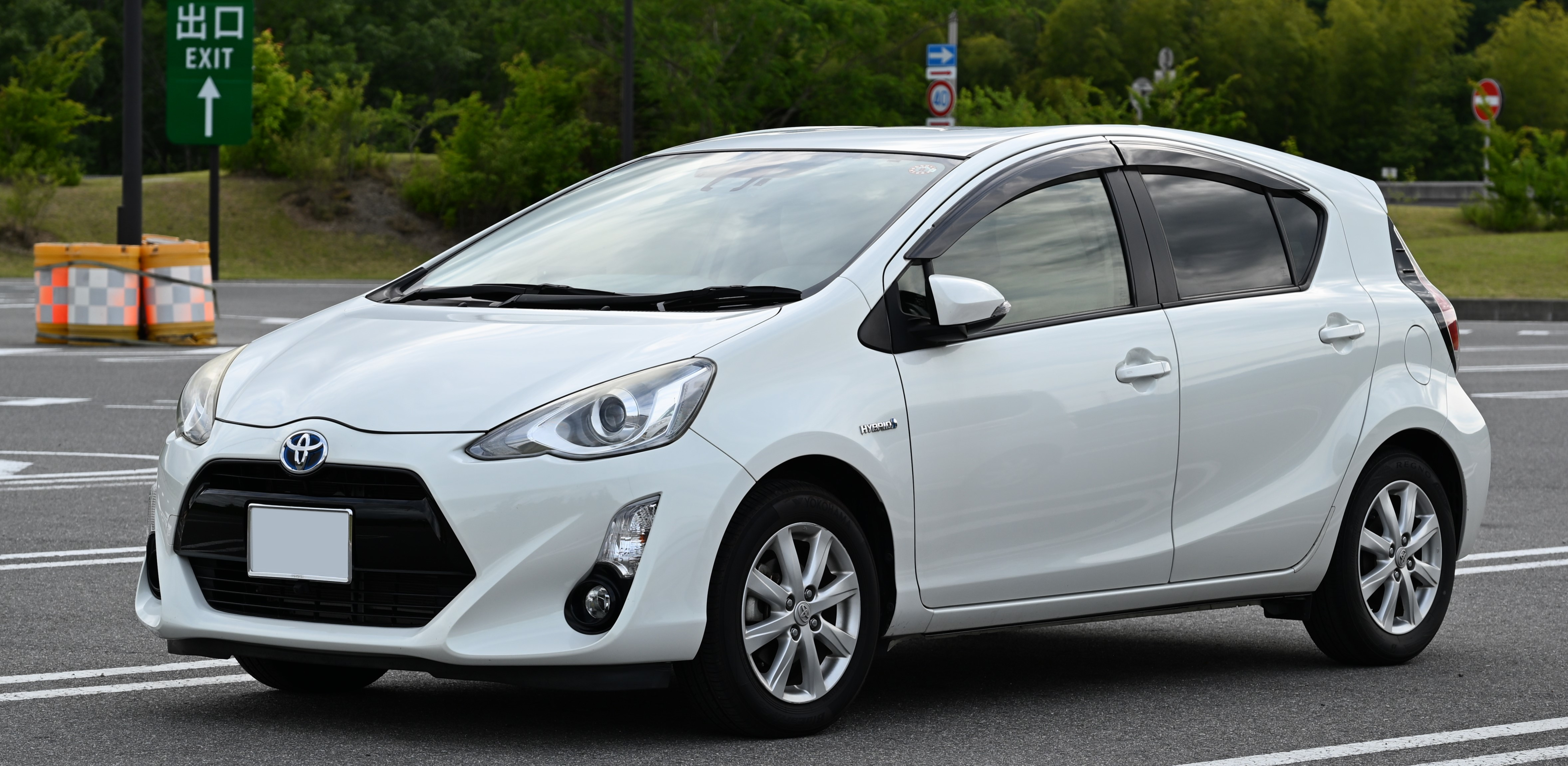
2014 Aqua (first facelift)

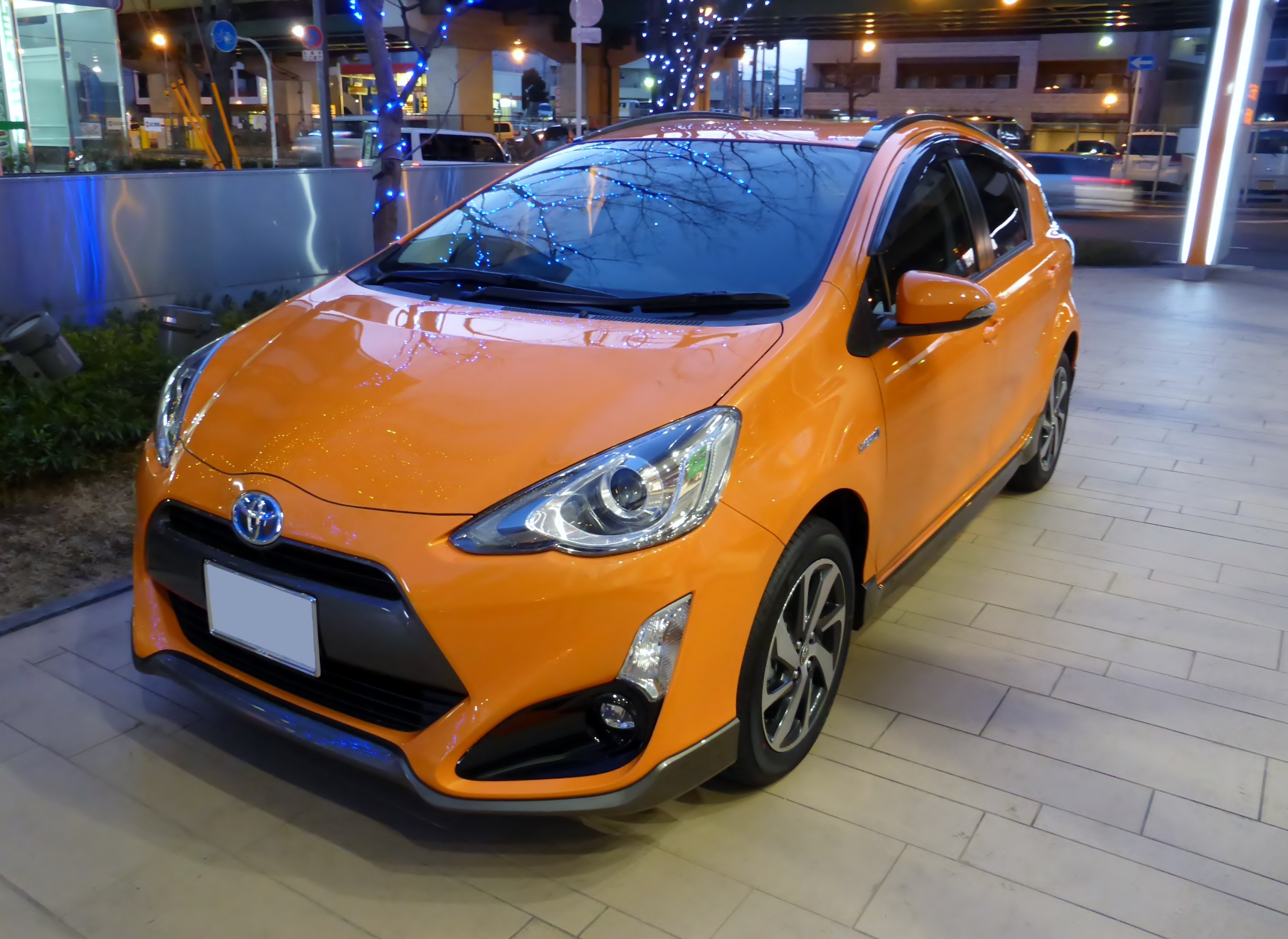
2014 Aqua X-URBAN, featuring a slightly different fascia

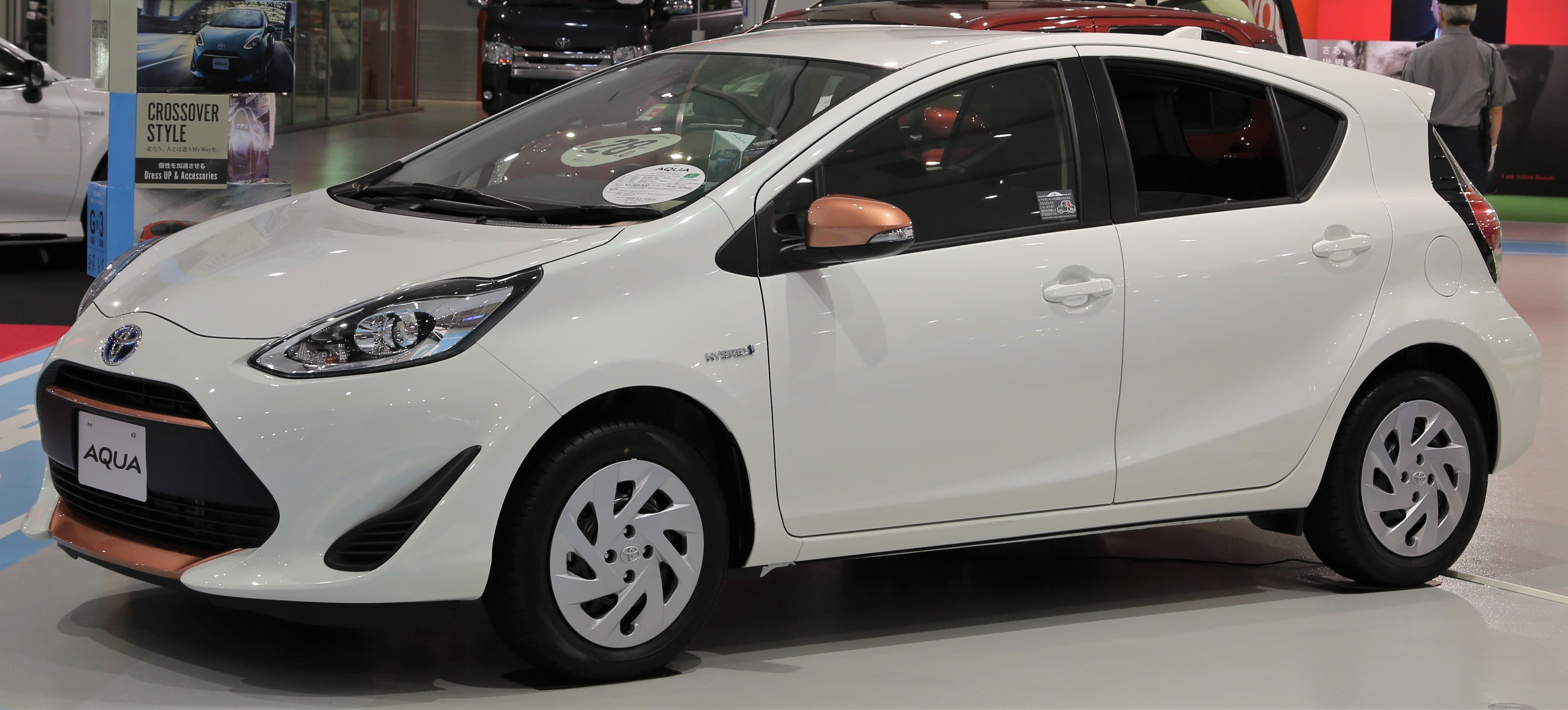
2017 Aqua (second facelift)

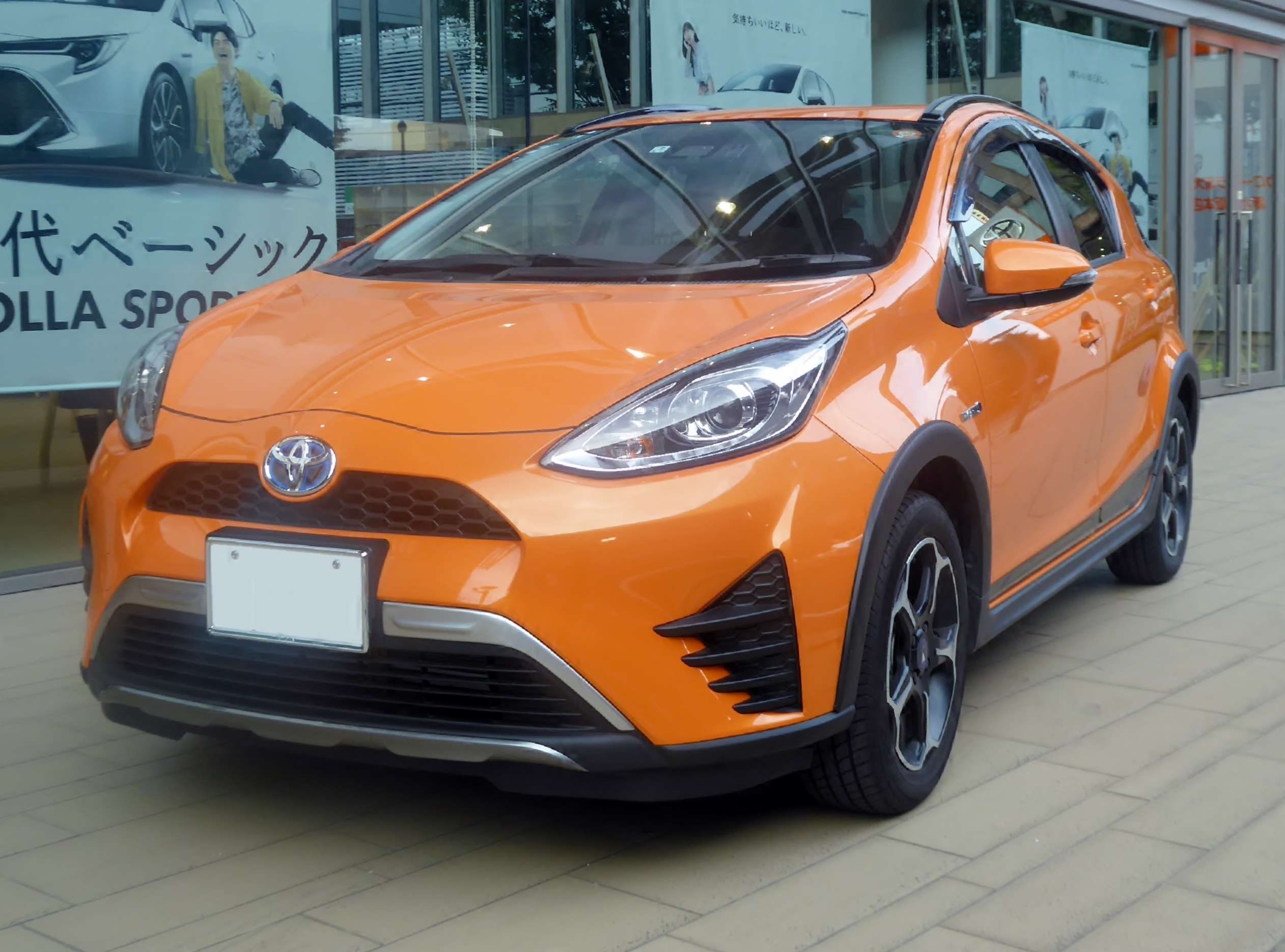
2017 Aqua Crossover

== Second generation (XP210; 2021) ==
Second generation
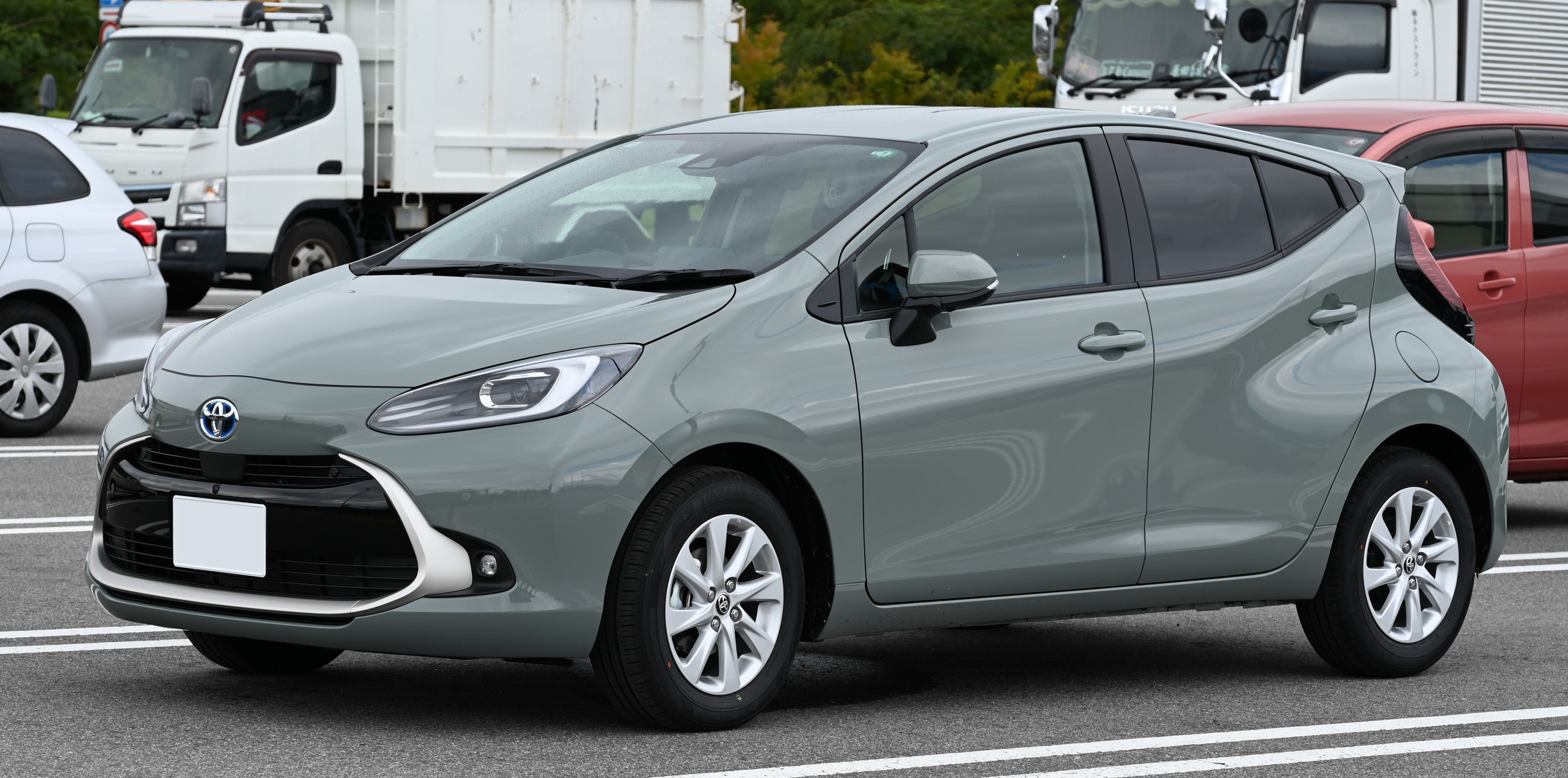
- Aqua Z (MXPK11; pre-facelift, Japan)

Overview
- Model code: XP210
- Production: 2021–present
- Assembly: Japan: Kanegasaki, Iwate (TMEJ)
- Designer: Shingo Tomooka (project chief designer); Yoshihiro Shimada, Syota Ito and Mika Ueno (exterior); Ryota Fujishima and Ai Murai (interior)

Body and chassis
- Layout: Front-engine, front-wheel-drive; Front-engine, four-wheel-drive (E-Four)
- Platform: TNGA: GA-B
- Related: Toyota Yaris (XP210); Toyota Yaris Cross (XP210); Toyota Sienta (XP210)

Powertrain
- Engine: Petrol hybrid: 1490 cc M15A-FXE I3 (MXPK10/11/15/16)
- Electric motor: 1NM AC synchronous (front); 1MM AC synchronous (rear)
- Power output: 67 kW (90 hp; 91 PS) (petrol engine only); 59 kW (79 hp; 80 PS) (1NM electric motor); 3.9–4.7 kW (5.2–6.3 hp; 5.3–6.4 PS) (1MM electric motor); 85 kW (114 hp; 116 PS) (combined system output)
- Transmission: eCVT
- Hybrid drivetrain: Power-split
- Battery: 5.0 Ah nickel–metal hydride battery (X, G, Z, GR Sport grades); 4.3 Ah lithium-ion (B grade)

Dimensions
- Wheelbase: 2,600 mm (102.4 in)
- Length: 4,050–4,095 mm (159.4–161.2 in)
- Width: 1,695 mm (66.7 in)
- Height: 1,485–1,505 mm (58.5–59.3 in)
- Curb weight: 1,080–1,230 kg (2,381–2,712 lb)

The second-generation Aqua was unveiled on 19 July 2021 and went on sale on the same day. Built on the GA-B platform shared with the XP210 series Yaris, the wheelbase has been extended by 50 mm (2.0 in) compared to the previous generation. It retained the 1,695 mm (66.7 in) width, allowing it to remain in the "compact car" category of Japanese government dimension regulations. It was initially offered in four grade levels: B, X, G and Z. The GR Sport grade was added later on 29 November 2022.

According to Toyota, the second-generation Aqua is the world's first vehicle to use a high-output bipolar nickel–metal hydride battery. This offers twice the output of the standard nickel-metal hydride battery in the previous generation. The battery also delivers improved accelerator responsiveness and enables linear and smooth acceleration from low speeds, according to the carmaker. The speed range at which the vehicle can operate solely on electrical power has also been increased. This battery is used on the X, G, Z and GR Sport grades, while the B grade used the lithium-ion unit.

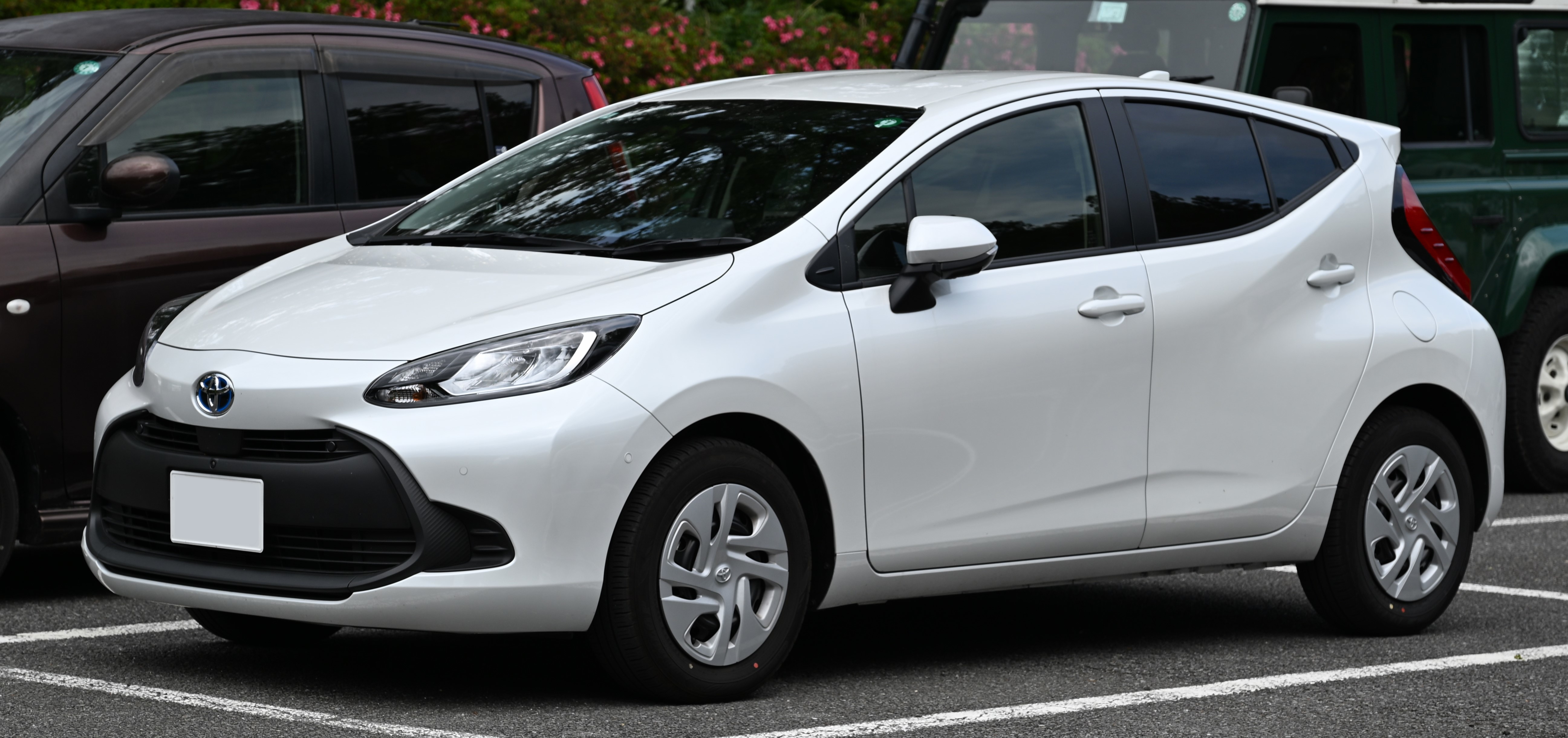
2024 Aqua X (MXPK11; pre-facelift, Japan)

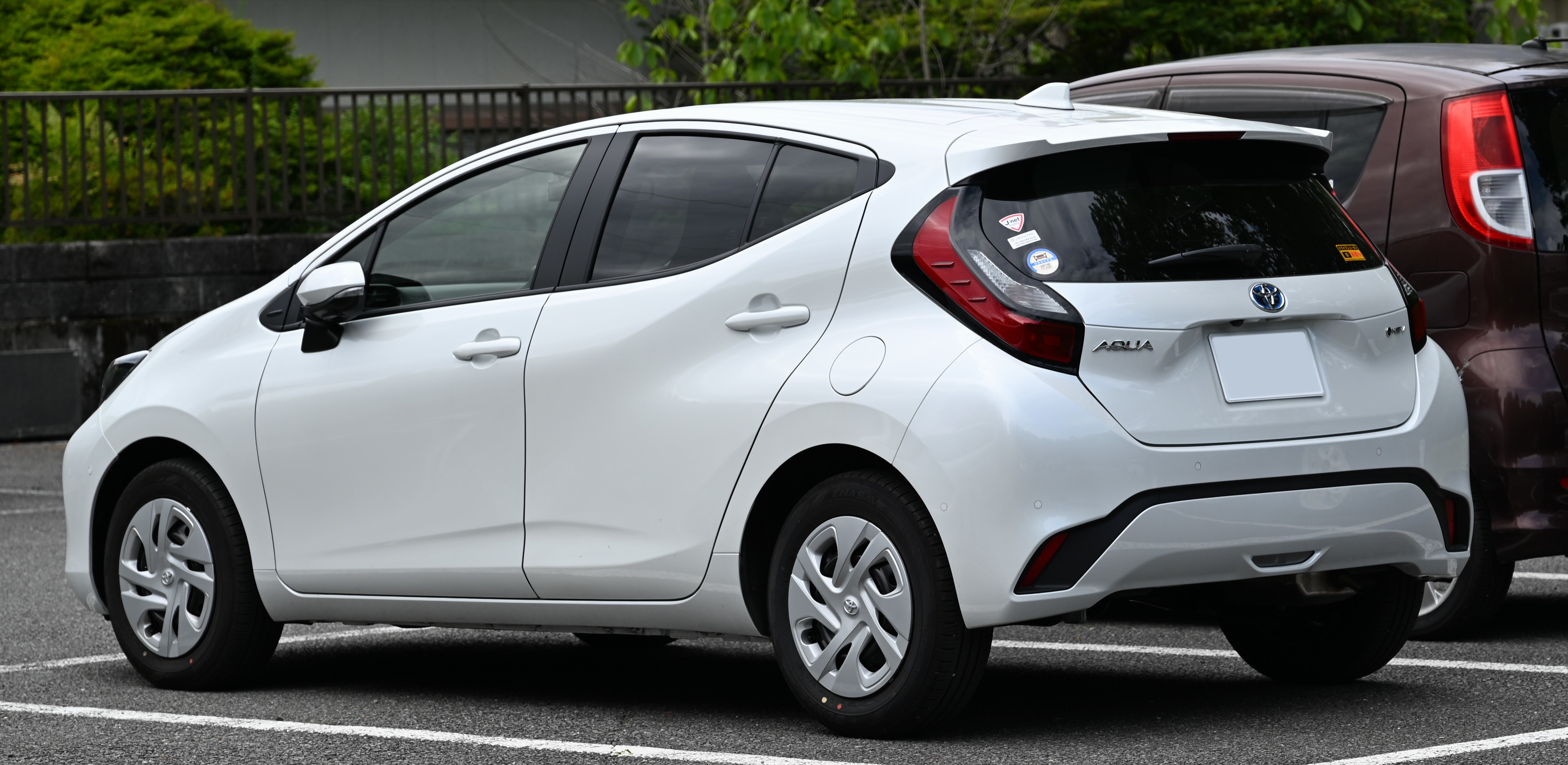
2024 Aqua X (MXPK11; pre-facelift, Japan)

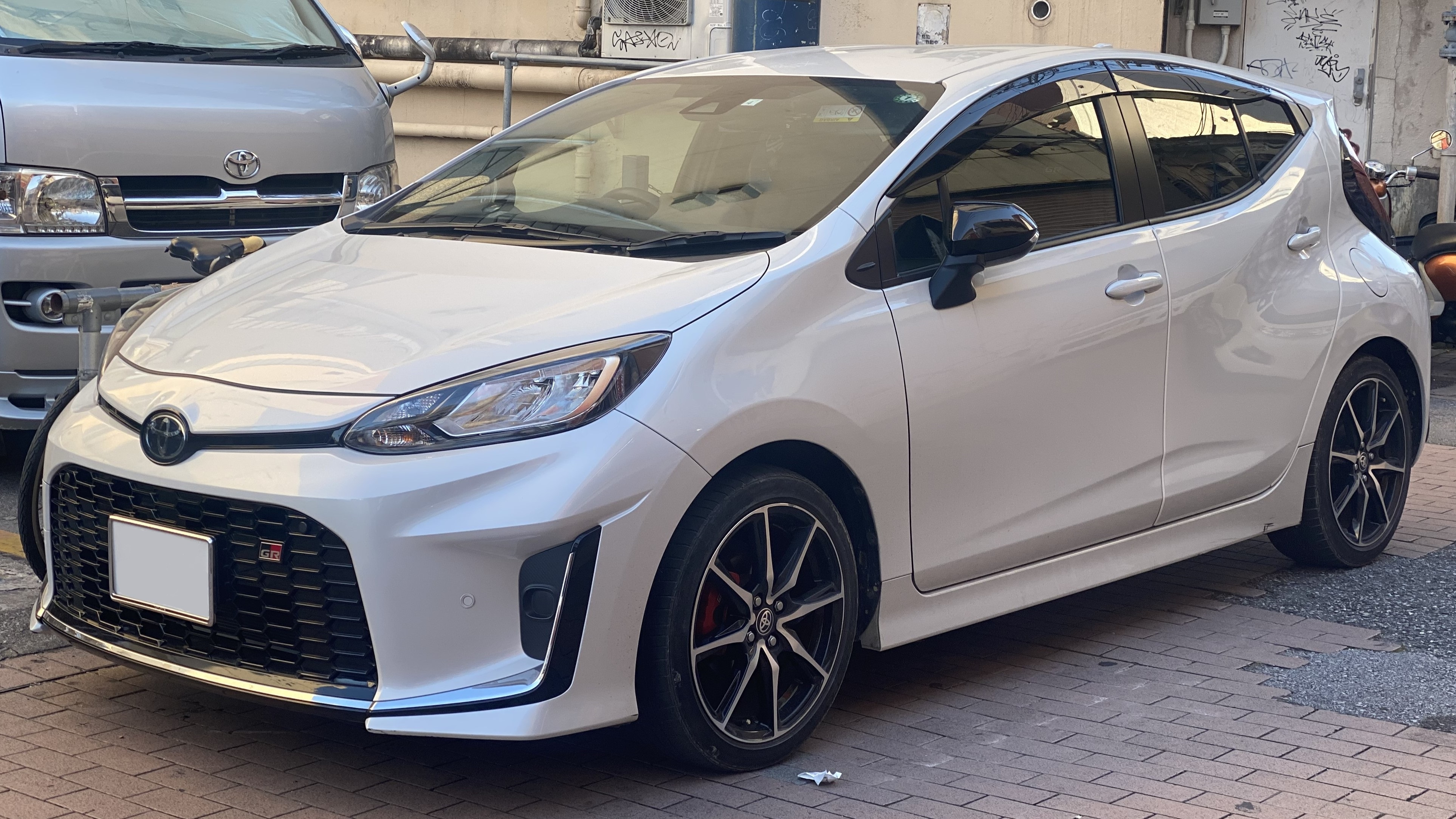
2023 Aqua GR Sport (MXPK11; pre-facelift, Japan)

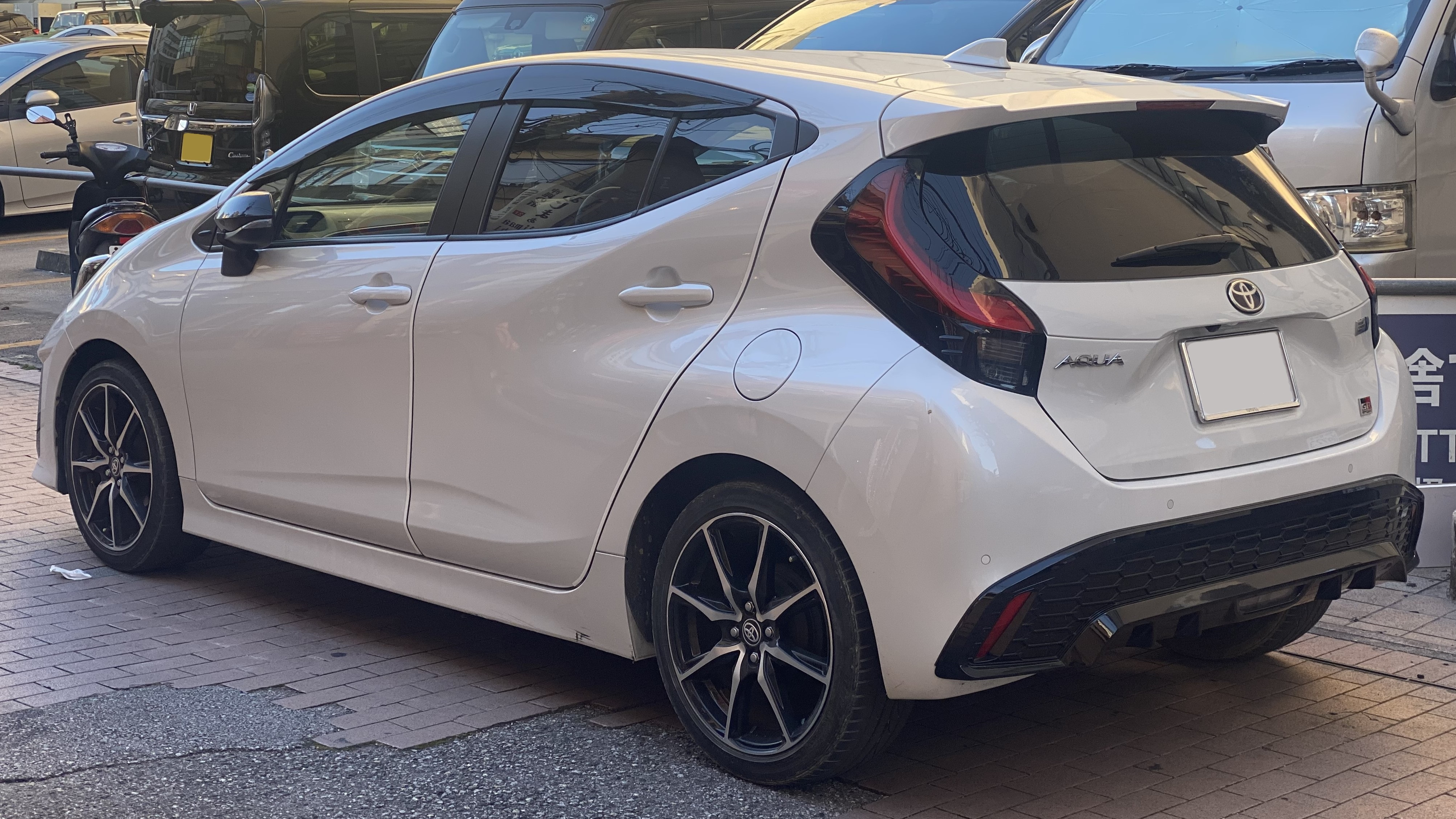
2023 Aqua GR Sport (MXPK11; pre-facelift, Japan)

Interior

=== Facelift (2025) ===
A mid-cycle facelift was announced on 1 September 2025. It features updated exterior styling including a hammerhead grille and slim LED headlights, with some trims having a unique centre lamp. Safety enhancements include the latest Toyota Safety Sense with Proactive Driving Assist for improved steering and braking support involving pedestrians, cyclists, or stationary objects. New features comprise front and rear dash cameras, ETC 2.0 compatibility, Blind Spot Monitor, and Panoramic View Monitor. A new subscription-only "U" grade was introduced under the KINTO service. The GR Sport variant was updated on 6 July 2026.

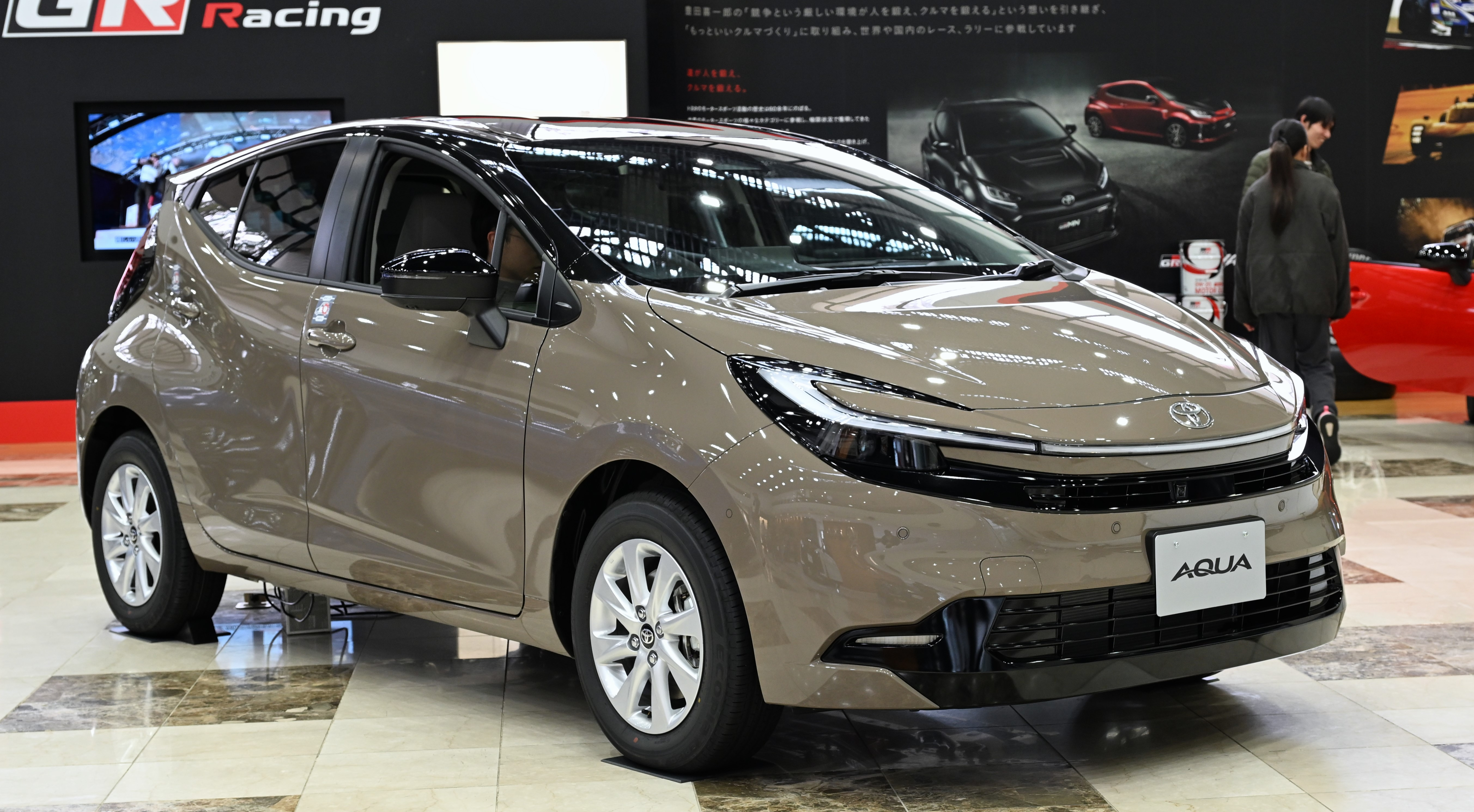
2025 Aqua Z (MXPK11; facelift, Japan)

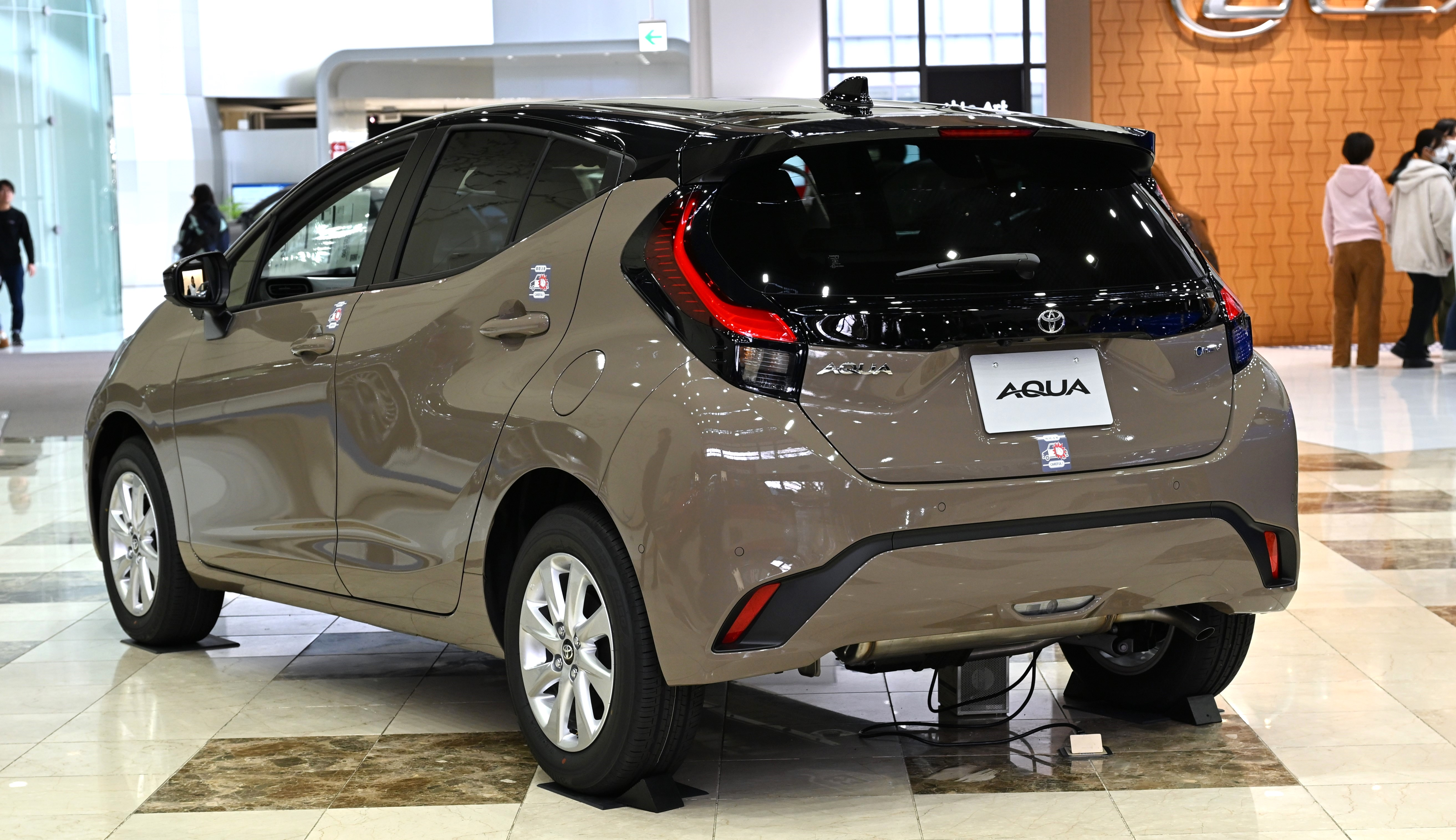
2025 Aqua Z (MXPK11; facelift, Japan)

== Sales ==
Calendar year	Japan
2011	361
2012	266,574
2013	262,367
2014	233,212
2015	215,525
2016	168,208
2017	131,615
2018	126,561
2019	103,803
2020	59,548
2021	72,495
2022	72,084
2023	80,268
2024	64,180
2025	68,499

== See also ==
- List of Toyota vehicles
