= List of car audio manufacturers and brands =

This list of car audio manufacturers and brands comprises brand labels and manufacturers of both original equipment manufacturer (OEM) and after-market products generally related to in-car entertainment that already have articles within Wikipedia. While components sold by these companies have much in common with other audio applications or may market the same products for non-ICE applications, they are noted for marketing their products specifically for ICE use.

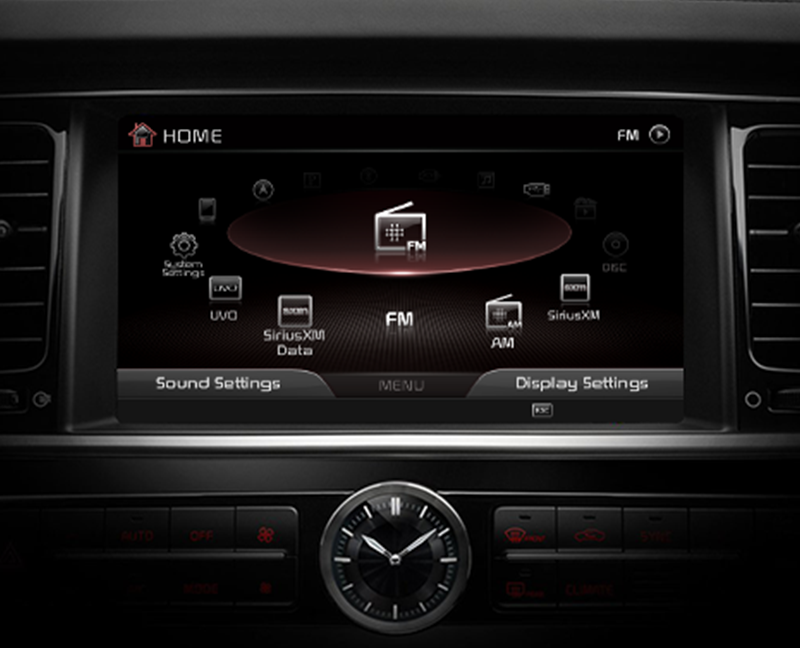
Lexicon OEM audio with UVO eServices with Premium Nav, in a Kia K900

- Alpine (Supplies OEM audio for Dodge, Honda, Jaguar, Jeep and Land Rover vehicles)
- Audison
- Beats (Supplies OEM audio for Chrysler, Fiat, Jeep, SEAT and Volkswagen vehicles)
- Blaupunkt (Supplied OEM audio for Audi, BMW, Fiat, Opel, SEAT, Škoda, Vauxhall and Volkswagen vehicles)
- Bose (Supplies OEM audio to Alfa Romeo, Buick, Chevrolet, Cadillac, GMC, Honda, Hyundai, Infiniti, Kia, Mazda, MG, Nissan, Opel, Porsche, Renault, Roewe and Vauxhall vehicles)
- Boss Audio
- Burmester Audiosysteme (Supplies OEM audio for Bugatti, Ferrari, Mercedes-Benz and Porsche vehicles)
- Cerwin-Vega Mobile
- Clarion (Supplied OEM audio for Ford, Infiniti, Kia, Mazda, Nissan, Peugeot, Subaru, Suzuki, Toyota and Volkswagen vehicles)
- Digital Designs
- Directed Electronics (manufactures tuners for SIRIUS-XM Satellite Radio)
- Dual
- Dynaudio (Supplies OEM audio to Bugatti, BYD, Volkswagen and Volvo vehicles)
- Focal-JMLab (Supplies OEM audio for Alpine, Citroën, DS Automobiles, Opel, Peugeot, Rimac and Vauxhall vehicles)
- Grundig
- Harman International Industries
  - AKG (Supplies OEM audio to Cadillac)
  - Bang & Olufsen (Supplies OEM audio for Acura, Aston Martin, Audi, BMW, Ford, Genesis and Mercedes-Benz vehicles)
  - Boston Acoustics
  - Bowers & Wilkins (Supplies OEM audio to Aston Martin, BMW, Jaguar, McLaren, Polestar and Volvo vehicles)
  - Harman Kardon (Supplies OEM audio to BMW, BYD, Dodge, Hyundai, Kia, Mercedes-Benz, Mini, Ram Trucks, Subaru, Volvo and Volkswagen vehicles)
  - Infinity (Supplies OEM audio to BYD, Hyundai and Kia vehicles)
  - JBL (Supplies OEM audio to Fiat, Kia, MG and Toyota vehicles)
  - Lexicon (Supplies OEM audio to Genesis, Hyundai, Kia and Rolls-Royce vehicles)
  - Mark Levinson (Supplies OEM audio to Lexus and Toyota vehicles)
  - Polk Audio
  - Revel (Supplies OEM audio for Lincoln vehicles)
- Huawei (Supplies OEM audio for Arcfox and HIMA vehicles)
- Hyundai Mobis (Supplies OEM audio for Genesis, Hyundai and Kia vehicles, Hyundai Mobis also supplies complete sound systems to more than 20 different vehicle models across various global automotive brands as well as partners with high-end home audio specialists like Krell and Meridian Audio)
- JL Audio
- JVC
- KEF (Supplies OEM audio for Lotus vehicles)
- Kenwood (OEM option for Hyundai vehicles)
- Krell (Supplies OEM audio for Acura, Hyundai and Kia vehicles)
- LG Electronics (Supplies OEM audio for Opel, Peugeot, Renault, SEAT, Škoda, Vauxhall and Volkswagen vehicles)
- McIntosh (Supplies OEM audio for Ford, Jeep and Subaru vehicles)
- Meridian Audio (Supplies OEM audio to Jaguar, Kia, Land Rover, McLaren and Range Rover vehicles)
- Milbert Amplifiers (Vacuum tube car audio equipment)
- Monster Cable (manufactures speaker wiring)
- MTX Audio
- Nakamichi (OEM option for Lexus vehicles)
- Naim (OEM option for Bentley vehicles)
- Orion
- Panasonic (ELS and Fender) (Supplies OEM sound systems for Acura, Honda, Nissan and Volkswagen vehicles)
- Parrot Automotive
- Philips (Supplied OEM audio for Audi, BMW, Opel, Peugeot, Renault, Rover, Vauxhall and Volkswagen vehicles)
- Pioneer (Supplies OEM audio for Honda, Lexus, Mazda and Toyota vehicles)
- Sanyo
- Sonos (Supplies OEM audio for Audi vehicles)
- Sony (Supplies OEM audio for Chery, Ford, Jaecoo, Omoda, Toyota and Volkswagen vehicles)
- Yamaha (Supplies OEM audio for Mitsubishi vehicles)
