= Parrot Automotive =

French automobile technology company

Parrot Faurecia Automotive
- Type: Société par actions simplifiée
- Industry: Electronics and software
- Founded: 1994 (as Parrot) 2015 (as Parrot Automotive) 2017 (as Parrot Faurecia Automotive)
- Headquarters: Paris, France
- Key people: Jean-Luc Tété (CEO)
- Products: audio, electronics, and in-car entertainment systems for automotive OEMs
- Parent: Faurecia
- Website: www.parrot-faurecia-automotive.com

Parrot Faurecia Automotive SAS is a French tech company that designs, develops and markets infotainment products for passenger vehicles and commercial trucks.

== History and products ==
The Paris-based tech firm designs its own software, hardware and processors. It is an early adopter of Bluetooth technology and is an associate member of the Bluetooth Special Interest Group. Parrot originally stepped into the automotive business in the 2000s, with aftermarket Bluetooth hands free car kits and car radios. In 2011, at the Las Vegas Consumer Electronics Show, the company introduced the first Android-based car radio.

In the following years, Parrot's automotive business unit transitioned from aftermarket products for consumers to infotainment platforms and connectivity modules sold directly to car makers or to Tier-1 suppliers. Parrot's technology revolves around connectivity, analog and digital radio, voice processing and recognition. Parrot's head units provide entertainment features for the front and the rear of the vehicle, are mostly Android-based, and support Android Auto and Apple CarPlay. The Simple Box, introduced at CES 2016, enables the vehicle occupants to use their own tablets or smartphones as the main interface with their vehicles.

In 2014, Parrot joined the Open Automotive Alliance, an alliance of auto makers and tech companies fostering the use of Android in the automotive industry. In 2015, Parrot Automotive branched off from Parrot SA to become a fully owned subsidiary. In 2016, Parrot launched Octopus 3+, a TV and radio tuner processor.

In March 2017, Faurecia starts the acquisition project for Parrot Automotive. The company is renamed Parrot Faurecia Automotive. On October 1, 2018, Faurecia completed the acquisition of 100% of Parrot Faurecia Automotive

Parrot Automotive's customers include car makers such as McLaren, Volvo Cars, and Honda.
