= Volkswagen ID. Era 5S =

Plug-in hybrid mid-size sedan

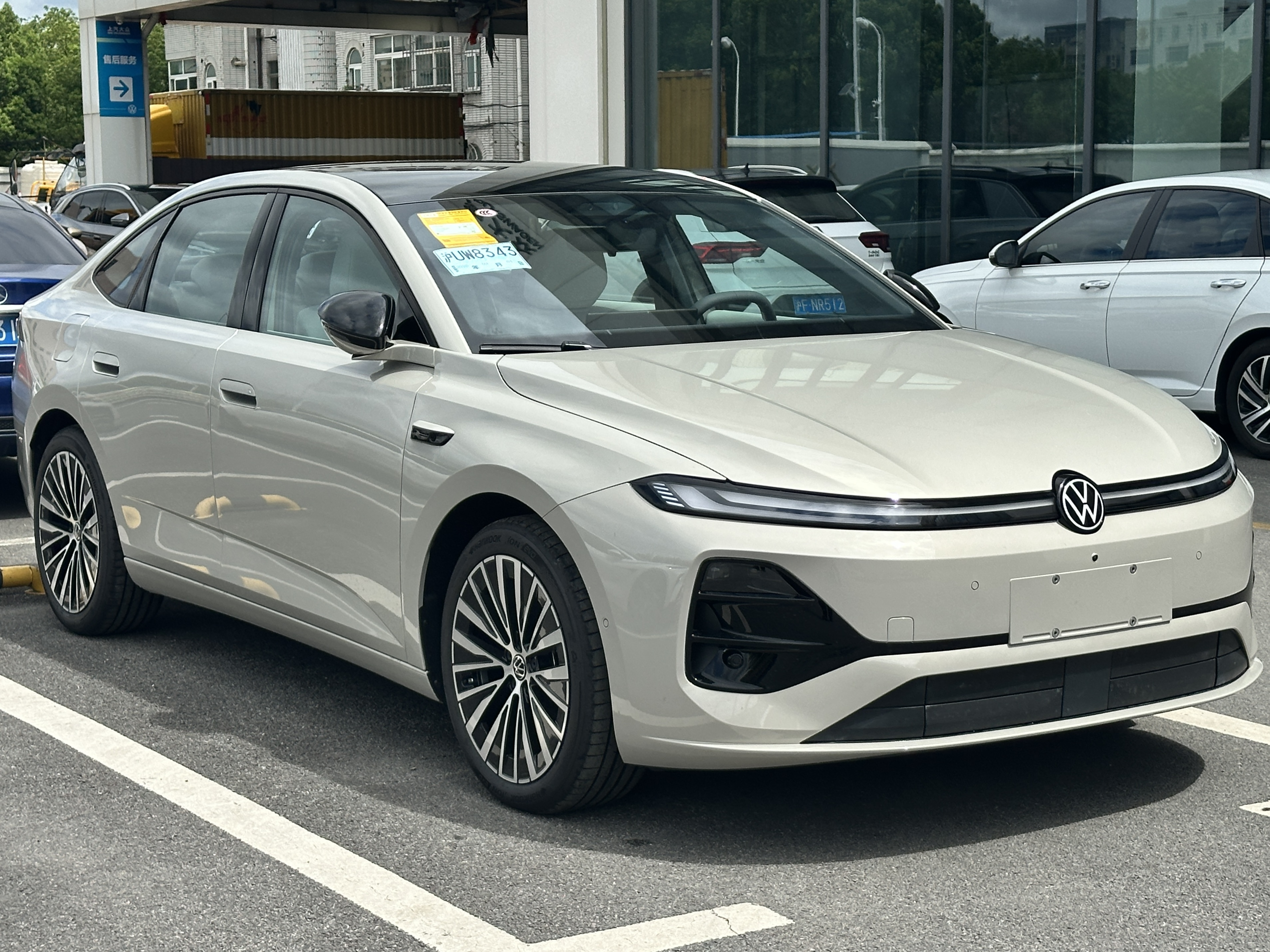
- Volkswagen ID. Era 5S

Overview
- Manufacturer: Volkswagen
- Production: July 2026 – present
- Assembly: China: Changsha (SAIC Volkswagen)

Body and chassis
- Class: Mid-size car
- Body style: 4-door sedan
- Layout: Front-engine, front-wheel drive
- Platform: Compact Main Platform (CMP)
- Related: Volkswagen ID. Era 5X

Powertrain
- Engine: Petrol plug-in hybrid: 1.5 L VWH I4
- Electric motor: TZ270XY441 AC PMSM
- Transmission: 1-speed DHT
- Hybrid drivetrain: Series-parallel hybrid
- Battery: 19.1 kWh LFP REPT Battero
- Range: 2,000 km (1,243 mi)+ (CLTC, combined)
- Electric range: 120 km (75 mi) (WLTC); 160 km (99 mi) (CLTC)

Dimensions
- Wheelbase: 2,766 mm (108.9 in)
- Length: 4,836 mm (190.4 in)
- Width: 1,880 mm (74.0 in)
- Height: 1,505 mm (59.3 in)
- Curb weight: 1,655 kg (3,649 lb)

The Volkswagen ID. Era 5S (Chinese: 大众ID. ERA 5S; pinyin: Dàzhòng ID. ERA 5S) is a plug-in hybrid mid-size sedan produced by Volkswagen under its SAIC-VW joint venture. It is sold under Volkswagen's ID. Era sub-brand.

== Overview ==
The exterior design and technical specifications of the ID. Era 5S was first unveiled through China's Ministry of Industry and Information Technology filings on 9 May 2026. It is the first sedan in the ID. Era sub-brand and Volkswagen's first plug-in hybrid sedan.

Production of the ID. Era 5S commenced in July 2026, with sales beginning on 21 August 2026 at the Chengdu Auto Show in five trim levels: Pure, Neo, Pro, Pro Navigation, and Max.

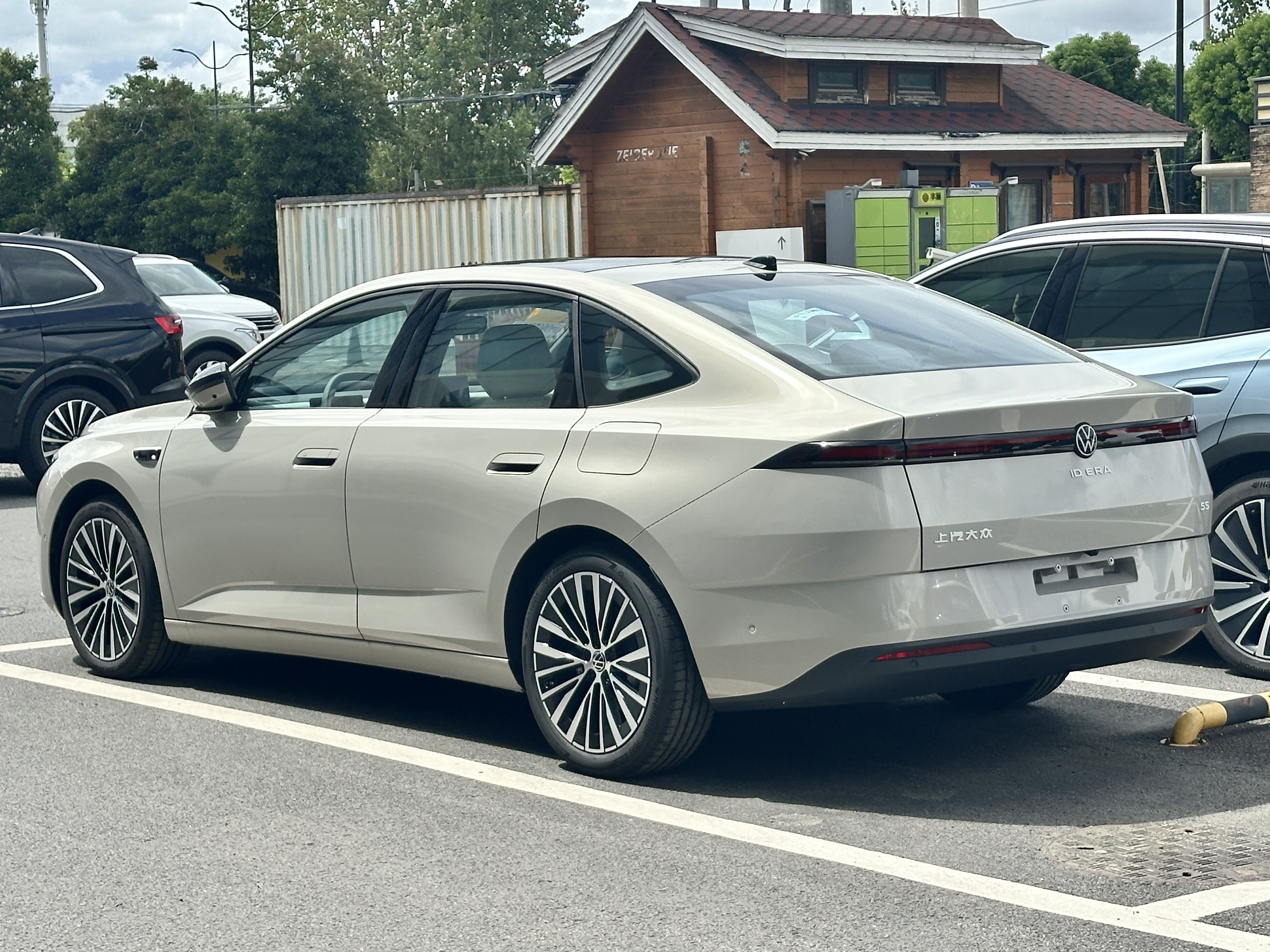
Rear view

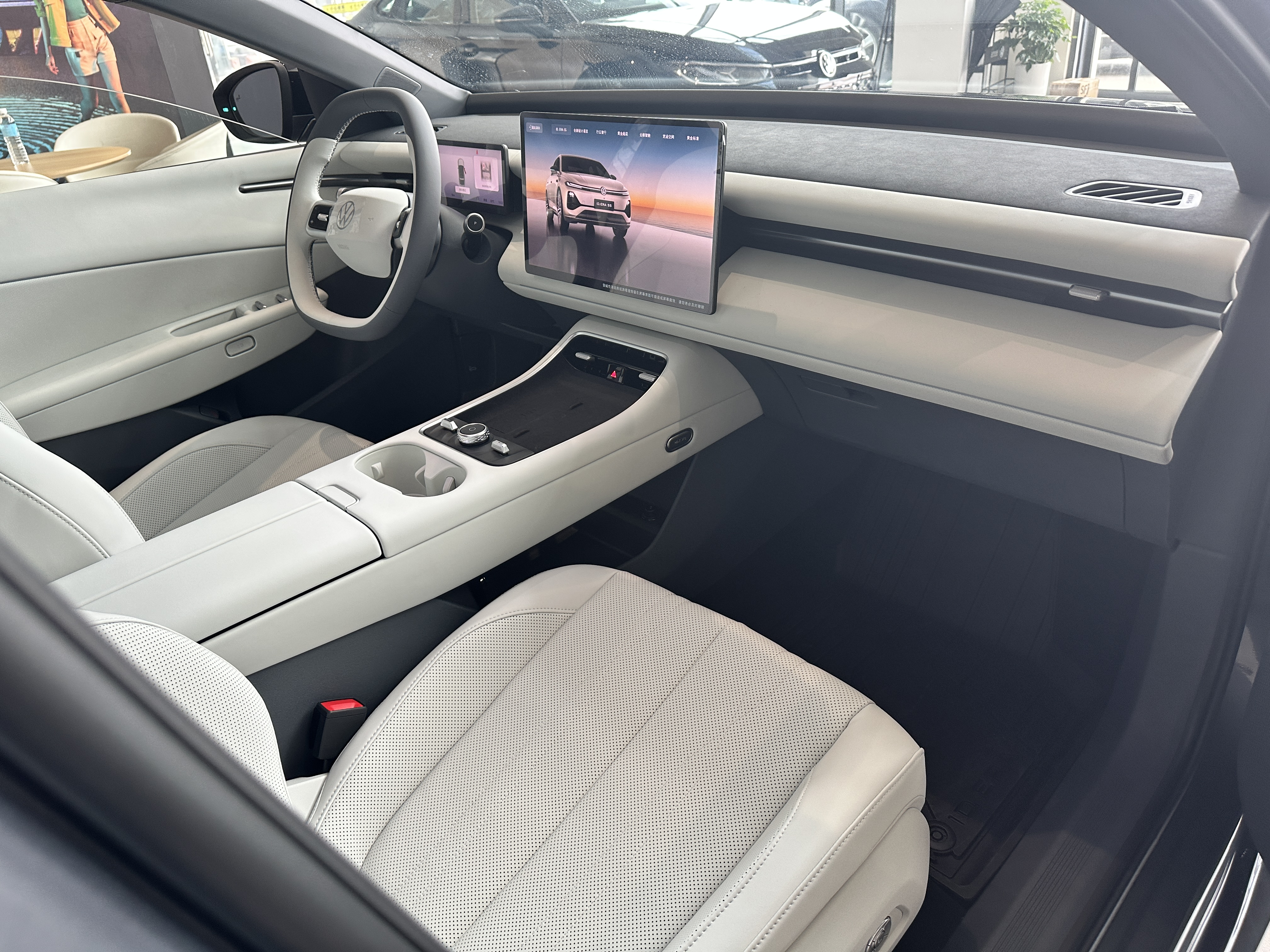
Interior

== Design and equipment ==
The ID. Era 5S follows the ID. Era family's design language, with a full-width daytime running light bar connecting to an illuminated Volkswagen logo at the front and split headlight clusters integrated with the lower air intakes. Other design features include semi-flush door handles, a full-width rear light bar with an illuminated logo, and a panoramic glass sunroof. Fifteen aerodynamic refinements were used to achieve a drag coefficient of 0.247 Cd.

The cabin uses a wraparound dashboard layout with no physical buttons on the center console, pairing an 8.8-inch digital instrument display with a 15.6-inch 2.5K touchscreen standard across the range; infotainment supports CarPlay, HiCar, and Carlink, with a voice assistant co-developed with iFlytek. Front seats offer ventilation, heating, and ten-point massage, with the passenger seat reclining up to 145 degrees for a "lie-flat" mode; rear seats are heated.

The 5S is optionally equipped with Volkswagen's "Xingyun Zhixing" (行云智行) driver-assistance system, built on a customized version of Horizon Robotics' HSD algorithm to create what Volkswagen describes as an in-house single-stage, end-to-end driving model. It has a sensor suite consisting of 1 mmWave radar, 11 cameras, and 12 ultrasonic sensors, and is powered by a Horizon Robotics Journey 6M SoC. It supports highway and urban NOA (navigate on autopilot), automatic, remote, and cross-floor memory parking, with automatic emergency braking active up to 140 km/h.

== Powertrain ==
The ID. Era 5S uses a 1.5-liter naturally aspirated engine producing 80 kW (107 hp; 109 PS) and 126 N⋅m (93 lb⋅ft) of torque, paired with a front-mounted permanent magnet synchronous motor producing 130 kW (174 hp; 177 PS) and 270 N⋅m (199 lb⋅ft), through a single-speed dedicated hybrid transmission (DHT). The battery is a 19.1 kWh lithium iron phosphate (LFP) pack supplied by REPT Battero, giving an electric range of 160 km (99 mi) (CLTC) or 120 km (75 mi) (WLTC). Volkswagen states a combined range of more than 2,000 km (1,243 mi) and fuel consumption of 2.82 L/100 km (CLTC) with a depleted battery. The battery supports 30–80% DC fast charging in 15 minutes and 3.5 kW external (vehicle-to-load) discharge. Top speed is 165 km/h (103 mph).

Specifications
Battery		Engine		Motor		Electric range		30–80% charge time	Top speed	Kerb weight
Type	Weight	Power	Torque	Power	Torque	WLTP	CLTC	30–80% charge time	Top speed	Kerb weight
19.1kWh LFP REPT	174 kg (384 lb)	103 hp (77 kW; 104 PS)	126 N⋅m (93 lb⋅ft)	175 hp (130 kW; 177 PS)	270 N⋅m (199 lb⋅ft)	120 km (75 mi)	160 km (99 mi)	15 min	165 km/h (103 mph)	1,655 kg (3,649 lb)

== Sales ==
On 17 October 2026, SAIC-Volkswagen announced that deliveries of the ID. Era 5S has exceeded 10,000 units, with another 17,053 orders pending.
