= MirrorLink =

Interoperable communications standard

MirrorLink is a device interoperability standard that offers integration between a smartphone and a car's infotainment system.

It transforms smartphones into automotive application platforms where apps are hosted and run on the smartphone while drivers and passengers interact with them through the steering wheel controls, dashboard buttons and touch screens of their car's In-Vehicle Infotainment (IVI) system. MirrorLink utilizes a set of well-established, non-proprietary technologies such as IP, USB, Wi-Fi, Bluetooth, Real-Time Protocol (RTP, for audio) and Universal Plug and Play (UPnP). In addition, MirrorLink uses Virtual Network Computing (VNC) as the baseline protocol to display the user interface of the smartphone applications on the infotainment system screens and to communicate user input back to the mobile device.

== Beginnings ==
Researcher Jörg Brakensiek and Raja Bose, from Nokia Research Center in Palo Alto, US, took results from the noBounds! project invented by researcher Bernd Steinke from the Nokia Research Center in Bochum, Germany and applied them to the automotive domain.

The initial approach applied by Bernd Steinke contained three specialised sub-protocols for optimal power efficiency: 2D, 3D and Media. Support for 2D graphics composition via X11 mirroring was only needed by the requirements of the chosen source device, a Nokia N800 mobile Linux device, and the desire to speed up demo availability to show mirroring use cases. OpenGL ES was used for fast 3D graphics and alpha based Porter-Duff compositing for shine-through 2D effects. To make this future relevant approach available on the limited N800 Mesa 3D was used for local playback. High Definition Media streaming was implemented via OpenMAX, RTP and a timed sideband control to allow synchronous displayed streaming of the original video file without transcoding. The Initial implementations have remoted the GUI, Games and media content of an Nokia N800 and later an N810 mobile Linux device. This demonstration of, at that time, not expected capabilities of mobile devices, was widely reported.

First ideas have been published and demonstrated using a Nokia N810 Internet tablet at IEEE CCNC 2009 conference. Together with two other researchers, Raja Bose and Keun-Young Park, from Nokia Research Center in Palo Alto, and in close collaboration with the Consumer Electronics for Automotive (CE4A) group of German car manufacturer, the original Terminal Mode concept has been created. The name Terminal Mode originated from the name of the Expert Group within the CE4A, which created a Positioning Paper.

Nokia, together with Magneti Marelli, publicly demonstrated a first Terminal Mode concept, during a Navteq Connection event, in conjunction with the Frankfurt International Auto Show (IAA) in September 2009. A first car integration was shown at Geneva Auto Show in March 2010, using a Nokia N97 prototype implementation of Terminal Mode, integrated into a Valmet concept car. A draft 0.9 specification version was released in March 2010. In July 2010 the Terminal Mode was presented, integrated to a VW Passat at MobileBeat 2010. A first real live demonstration can be seen in from September 2010, shortly before the Terminal Mode specification became public on 6 October 2010.

The collaboration between Nokia and CE4A on Terminal Mode led to the formation of the Car Connectivity Consortium. The Car Connectivity Consortium brought together major players in the automotive and mobile device industries including a large number of Tier-I suppliers and even a few network providers. On 12 September 2011, Terminal Mode was renamed as MirrorLink and became a commercial trademark owned by the Car Connectivity Consortium.

In September 2021 the Car Connectivity Consortium announced to terminate all MirrorLink operations by September 30, 2023.

== Global standard ==
The Car Connectivity Consortium, made up of various auto and electronic manufacturers, has joined together to establish an industry standard for certifying apps and devices that are both safe and useful for drivers, called MirrorLink. The joint effort by car manufacturers and phone makers is aimed at developing open standards to define operations of smartphones linked to cars.

MirrorLink has the ability to show the smartphone interface from a variety of mobile OS platforms on the audio head-unit display.

== MirrorLink implementation ==
MirrorLink currently works with Symbian phones (only Nokia Belle phones, not S60v5 phones from many manufacturers), Samsung Galaxy series (on Android Lollipop (5.0); Samsung support for MirrorLink ended 1 June 2020), and Sony Xperia Z series Android phones.

== See also ==
- CarPlay
- Android Auto
- Open Automotive Alliance
