= Volkswagen ID. Era 5X =

Chinese-market electric SUV

Overview
- Manufacturer: Volkswagen
- Production: October 2026 – present
- Assembly: China: Ningbo and Shanghai (SAIC Volkswagen)

Body and chassis
- Class: Compact SUV
- Body style: 5-door crossover SUV
- Layout: Front-motor, front-wheel drive
- Platform: Compact Main Platform (CMP)
- Related: Volkswagen ID. Era 5S

Powertrain
- Electric motor: 155 kW TZ220QY173 PMSM
- Battery: 45.8 kWh LFP Gotion; 58.5 kWh LFP Gotion/CATL
- Electric range: 415–520 km (258–323 mi) (CLTC)
- Plug-in charging: V2L: 3.5 kW

Dimensions
- Wheelbase: 2,815 mm (110.8 in)
- Length: 4,560 mm (179.5 in)
- Width: 1,896 mm (74.6 in)
- Height: 1,630 mm (64.2 in)
- Curb weight: 1,685 kg (3,715 lb)

The Volkswagen ID. Era 5X (Chinese: 大众ID. ERA 5X; pinyin: Dàzhòng ID. ERA 5X) is a battery electric compact SUV produced by Volkswagen under its SAIC-VW joint venture in China. Marketed under Volkswagen's ID. Era sub-brand, it is the family's first fully electric model, following the range-extended EV ID. Era 9X and ID. Era 8X and the plug-in hybrid ID. Era 5S. It is also Volkswagen's first production model globally to combine the China-specific Compact Main Platform (CMP) with the China Electronic Architecture (CEA), the latter co-developed with XPeng.

== History ==
Details of the ID. Era 5X surfaced through a filing with China's Ministry of Industry and Information Technology (MIIT) on 7 August 2026, with Volkswagen and SAIC Volkswagen providing further official details the following day.

The model made its public debut on 21 August 2026 at the Chengdu Auto Show, where it appeared alongside the ID. Era 9X, 8X, and 5S. The ID. Era 5X started production on 20 October 2026, and completed its market launch on 12 November 2026.

Rear view

Interior

== Development and equipment ==
The ID. Era 5X is built on the Compact Main Platform (CMP), a China-specific platform Volkswagen developed for lower-cost electric vehicles in the country, separate from the global MEB platform. The platform is paired with the China Electronic Architecture (CEA), a zonal electrical and electronic architecture co-developed by Volkswagen Group China Technology Company, CARIAD China, and XPeng. CEA had previously been used on other Volkswagen China models built on the MEB platform; the ID. Era 5X is Volkswagen's first production vehicle globally to combine CEA with the new CMP platform.

The ID. Era 5X follows the ID. Era family's design language, with a full-width daytime running light bar and an illuminated Volkswagen logo at the front, a "Lingmou" matrix LED headlights positioned lower on either side, as well as a through-going tail light bar consistent.

It uses MacPherson strut front and multi-link independent rear suspension geometries. It comes with either 17 or 18-inch wheels with 215 mm width tires, or 19-inch wheels with 235 mm wide tires.

The interior features a 10.25-inch digital instrument cluster, an optional heads-up display, and a 15.6-inch 2.5K-resolution central infotainment touchscreen. The center console features a 50-watt active-cooled wireless charging pad and a powered expansion slot which can mount accessories such as a physical control module or officially licensed Spongebob-themed illuminated decorations.

The ID. Era 5X is available with Volkswagen's "Xingyun Zhixing" (行云智行) assisted-driving system, jointly developed by SAIC Volkswagen and Chinese autonomous-driving company Momenta. It features a sensor suite consisting of one 192-line roof-mounted LiDAR, one mmWave radar, 11 cameras, and 12 ultrasonic sensors, and is powered by a Horizon Robotics 6H chip capable of 420 TOPS. Volkswagen describes the system as offering end-to-end, full-scenario urban Navigate on Autopilot (NOA) at Level 2++. The cabin uses Volkswagen's "Yunqi Zhicang" (云栖智舱) smart cockpit system powered by a Mediatek MT8676 chip, also used across other ID. Era models.

== Powertrain ==
The ID. Era 5X is front-wheel drive and uses a single electric motor, manufactured by United Automotive Electronic Systems (UAES). It produces 155 kW (208 hp; 211 PS) and 270 N⋅m (199 lb⋅ft) of torque, giving a top speed of 175 km/h (109 mph). Base variants are equipped with a 45.8 kWh LFP battery pack supplied by Gotion providing 415 kilometres (258 mi) of CLTC range. Long-range variants are equipped with a 58.5 kWh LFP pack providing 520 kilometres (323 mi) of CLTC range, and is sourced from Gotion on lower trims and CATL on higher spec trims. All packs are capable of recharging from 30–80% within 22 minutes.

Specifications
Battery		Motor	Power	Torque	Range	30–80% charge	0–100 km/h (62 mph)	Top speed	Kerb weight
Type	Weight	Front	Power	Torque	CLTC	30–80% charge	0–100 km/h (62 mph)	Top speed	Kerb weight
45.8 kWh LFP Gotion	343 kg (756 lb)	155 kW TZ220QY173 PMSM	208 hp (155 kW; 211 PS)	270 N⋅m (199 lb⋅ft)	415 km (258 mi)	22 min	7.1 s	175 km/h (109 mph)	1,685 kg (3,715 lb)
58.5 kWh LFP Gotion	428.2 kg (944 lb)	155 kW TZ220QY173 PMSM	208 hp (155 kW; 211 PS)	270 N⋅m (199 lb⋅ft)	520 km (323 mi)	22 min	7.3 s	175 km/h (109 mph)	1,780 kg (3,924 lb)
58.5 kWh LFP CATL	421 kg (928 lb)	155 kW TZ220QY173 PMSM	208 hp (155 kW; 211 PS)	270 N⋅m (199 lb⋅ft)	520 km (323 mi)	22 min	7.3 s	175 km/h (109 mph)	1,780 kg (3,924 lb)
