= Milbert =

Milbert may refer to:

- Milbert Amplifiers, American manufacturer of high-end audio equipment
- Jacques-Gérard Milbert, a French naturalist and artist
