= Volkswagen ID. Era =

The Volkswagen ID. Era is a sub-brand of Volkswagen, part of the Volkswagen ID. series and sold by its Chinese joint venture SAIC Volkswagen.

== Models ==
- Volkswagen ID. Era 9X, full-size crossover SUV (since 2026)
  - Volkswagen ID. Era, concept version of ID. Era 9X (2025)
- Volkswagen ID. Era 8X, mid-size crossover SUV (since 2026)
- Volkswagen ID. Era 5S, mid-size 4-door sedan (since 2026)
- Volkswagen ID. Era 5X, compact crossover SUV (since 2026)
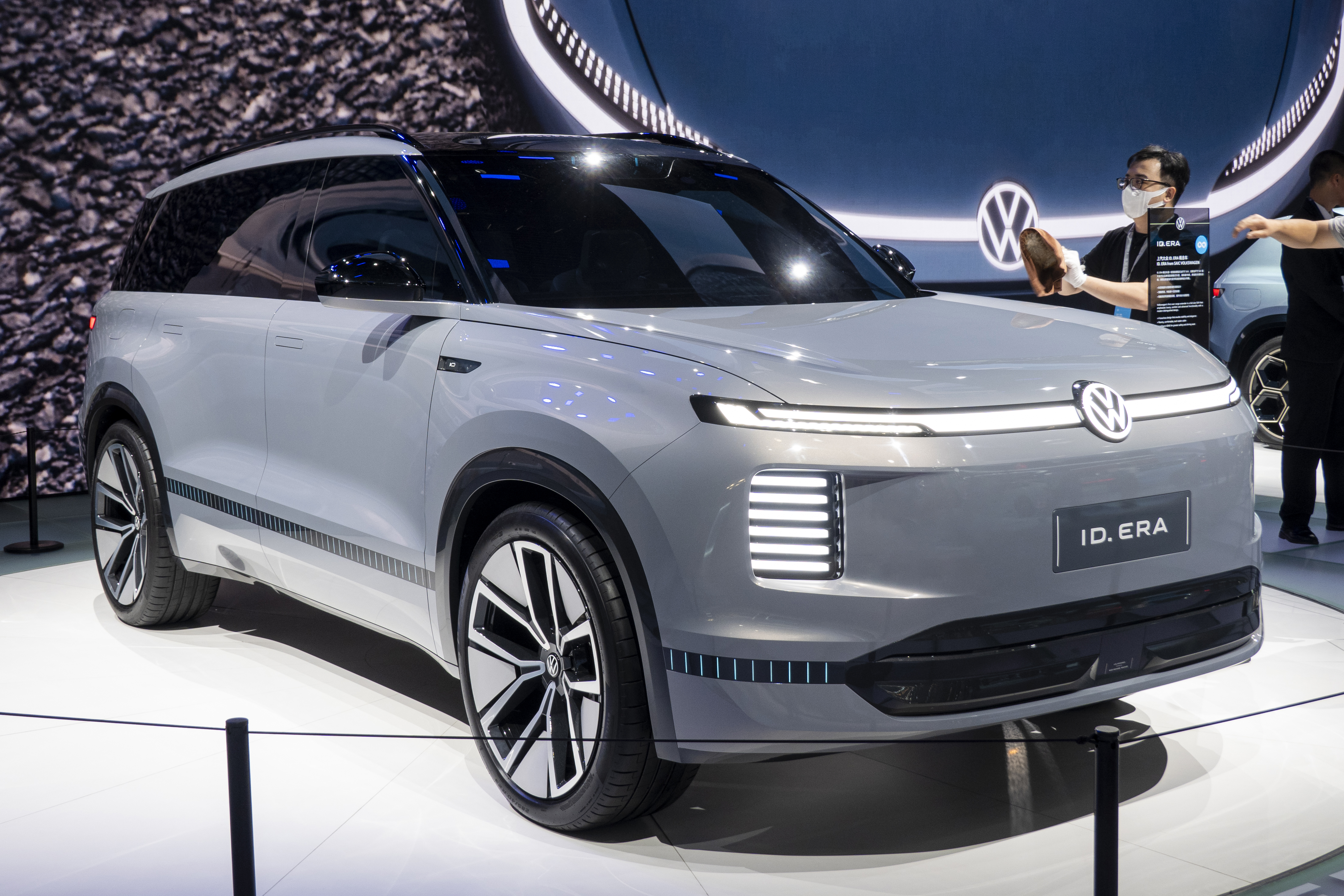
ID. Era concept

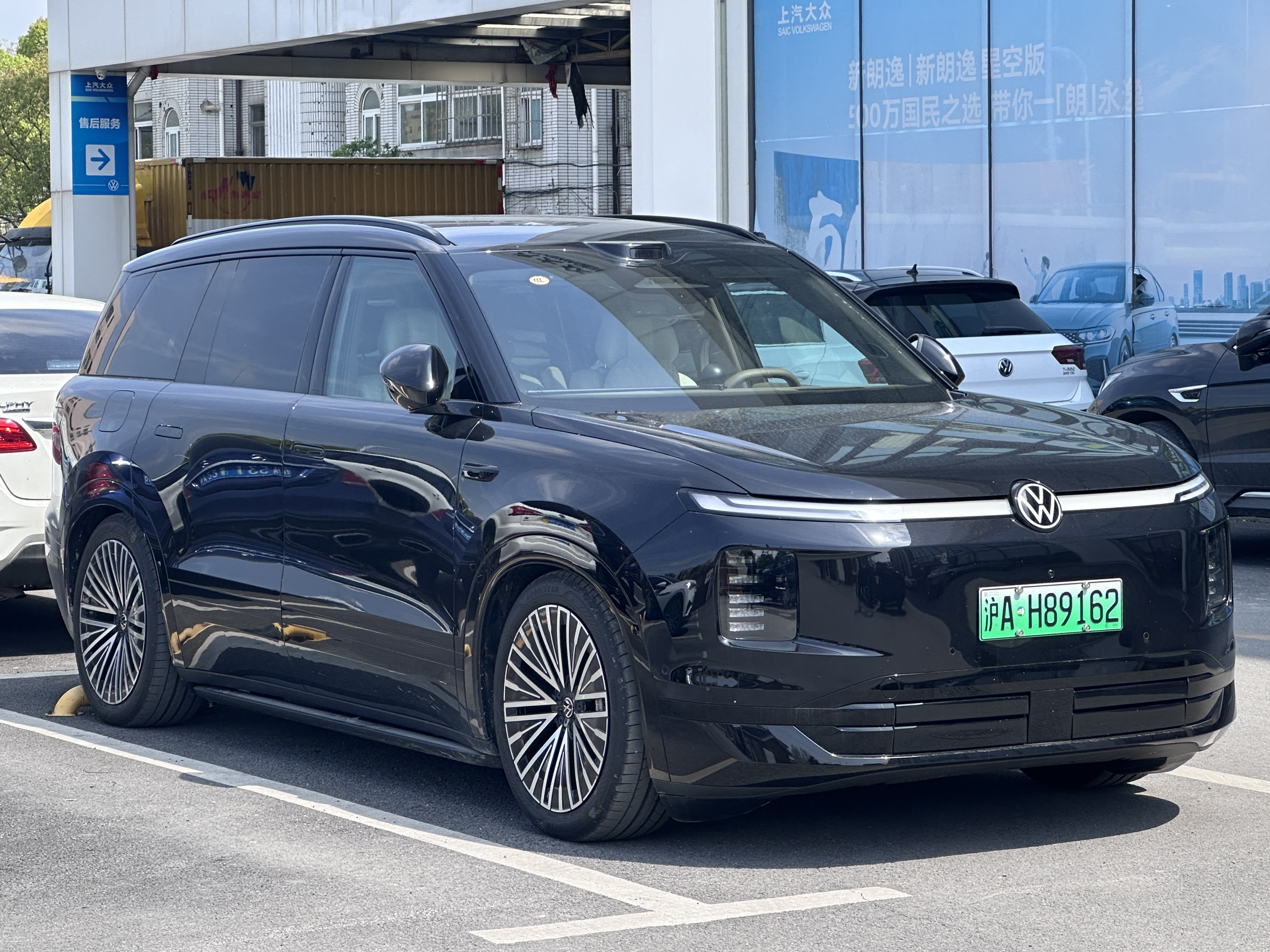
ID. Era 9X

ID. Era 8X

ID. Era 5X

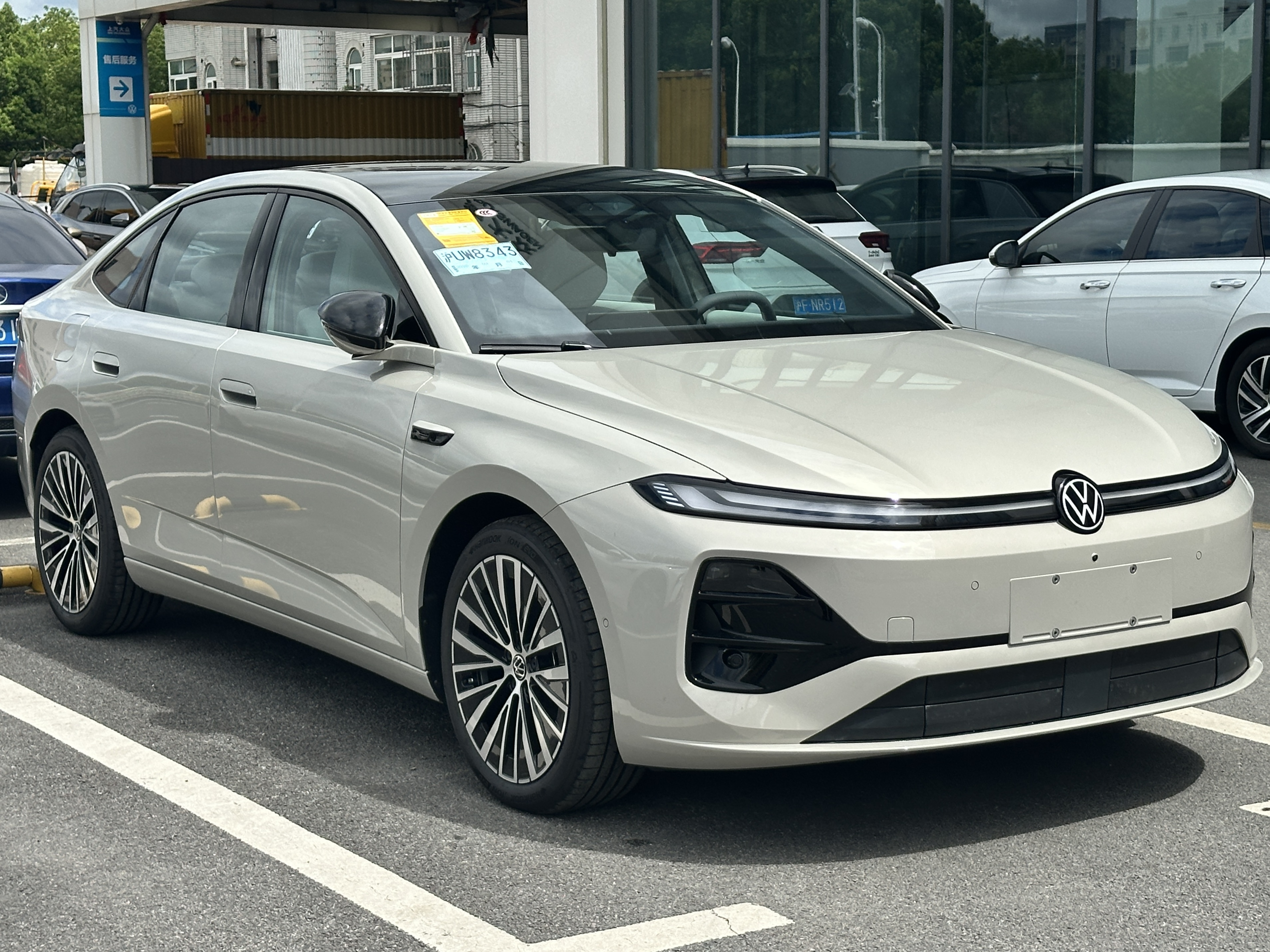
ID. Era 5S

== See also ==
- Volkswagen ID. series
- Volkswagen ID. Aura of FAW-Volkswagen
- Volkswagen ID. Unyx of Volkswagen Anhui
