= Open Automotive Alliance =

Alliance of automotive manufacturers and technology companies

- Abbreviation: OAA
- Formation: 2014; 12 years ago
- Headquarters: Silicon Valley, California, U.S.
- Region served: Worldwide
- Members: Software companies, automobile manufacturers
- Parent organization: Google Inc.
- Website: www.openautoalliance.net

The Open Automotive Alliance (OAA) is an alliance of automotive manufacturers and technology companies aimed at using Android in automobiles. It was announced at CES on January 6, 2014.

== Members ==
The members of the Open Automotive Alliance are:

Joining date	Car manufacturers	Software companies	Semiconductor companies	Electronics manufacturers
Founding members	Audi; General Motors; Honda; Hyundai	Google; CloudCar	Nvidia	
June 2014	Abarth; Acura; Alfa Romeo; Bentley; Chevrolet; Chrysler; Dodge; Fiat; Ford; Infiniti; Jeep; Kia; Maserati; Mazda; Mitsubishi; Nissan; Opel; Ram; Renault; SEAT; Škoda; Subaru; Suzuki; Volkswagen; Volvo Cars		Freescale Semiconductor	Alpine; Clarion; Delphi Automotive; Fujitsu Ten; Harman; Symphony Teleca; JVC Kenwood; LG; Panasonic; Parrot Automotive; Pioneer; Renesas
April 2016	Mercedes-Benz; Mahindra & Mahindra			

== See also ==
- Android Auto
- CarPlay, formerly iOS in the Car
- Windows Embedded Automotive
  - Ford Sync
- Open Handset Alliance
- QNX
- NNG
