= Krell Industries =

Premium audio equipment manufacturer

- Type: Private
- Industry: Consumer electronics
- Founded: 1980
- Founder: Dan & Rondi D'Agostino
- Headquarters: Orange, Connecticut, U.S.
- Products: High-end audio
- Website: https://www.krellaudioequipment.online (company URL no longer active)

Krell Industries Inc., designs and manufactures high performance, high-end audio and video equipment such as power amplifiers and preamplifiers. Since June 18, 2024, Krell Industries closed, following the death of its CEO. Its service operations resumed in March, 2025.

== Corporate history ==
Krell Industries was founded in 1980 by former Mark Levinson colleagues Dan D’Agostino and Rondi Halling (later D’Agostino after the couple married). In 2009, co-founder and chief engineer Dan D’Agostino left Krell to found Dan D’Agostino Master Audio Systems.

On June 18, 2024, Krell Industries closed following the unexpected death of owner and CEO Rondi D’Agostino. On March 19, 2025, it was announced that Krell’s service operations resumed and that Krell is planning to bring manufacturing back sometime in 2026.
