= Audison =

Italian car audio equipment brand

- Industry: Mobile electronics; Car audio
- Founded: 1979
- Founder: Pietro Pantaleone and Emidio Vagnoni
- Headquarters: Potenza Picena, Italy, Italy
- Key people: Pietro Pantaleone (President) and Emidio Vagnoni (Technical Director)
- Products: Mobile audio; Audio amplifiers; Loudspeakers; Audio processors
- Brands: Audison
- Parent: Elettromedia S.r.l.
- Website: audison.eu

Audison is one of the brands of the Italian company Elettromedia s.r.l., a manufacturer of car audio products. The company was founded in 1979, but Audison name (born from Latin words Audio and Sonus) was registered in 1984. Currently Audison has different kinds of mobile audio products: amplifiers, audio processors, speakers and subwoofers.

Audison has won numerous awards for sound quality as well as “amplifier” of the year awards (EISA and CES awards). The brand also counts many "Firsts" in its history: first amplifier with adjustable gain controls, first to build a dedicated mono block bass amplifier, first 5 channel amplifier.

== See also ==
- List of Italian Companies
