= DD Audio =

American audio product manufacturer

- Formerly: Digital Designs
- Company type: Subsidiary
- Industry: Sound reproduction
- Founded: 1986; 40 years ago
- Founders: Jassa Langford and Vicki Langford
- Headquarters: Oklahoma City, Oklahoma, United States
- Products: Audio electronics Subwoofers Loudspeakers
- Parent: Resonance, Inc.
- Website: www.ddaudio.com

DD Audio, formerly Digital Designs, is an American manufacturer of high-end consumer audio products. They produce home and mobile audio products including subwoofers and loudspeaker serving the sound quality and sound pressure categories of the mobile audio market. Nearly all of their products are handmade in the United States.

== History ==
DD Audio was established in 1986 in Southern California as Digital Designs by Jassa Langford and Vicki Langford, but moved to Oklahoma City in 1991.

== Notable products ==
- 9500 Series, these subwoofers are Digital Designs' highest end 3 inch voicecoil ceramic magnet model, and were voted one of the top 10 most badass subwoofers by car audio magazine
- Z Series, the Z Series line of subwoofers are unique in that they use a 13 lens neodymium motor architecture, which allows for higher motor force than available in any ceramic magnet subwoofer, and has been used successfully in many 180DB+ sound pressure competition vehicles.
