= Automotive head unit =

Centerpiece of the car's sound and information system

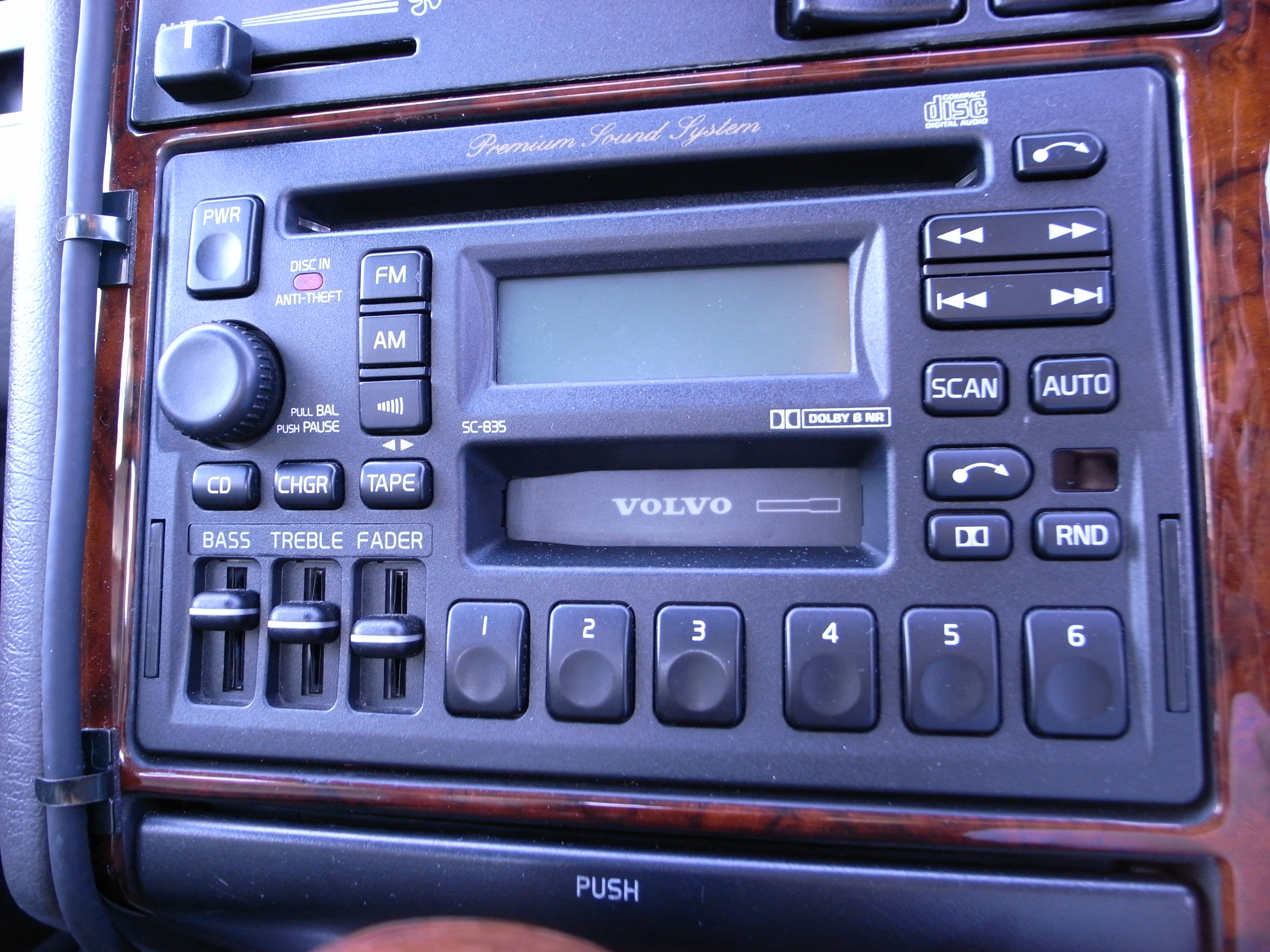
A Volvo 850 double DIN head unit with CD and Compact Cassette

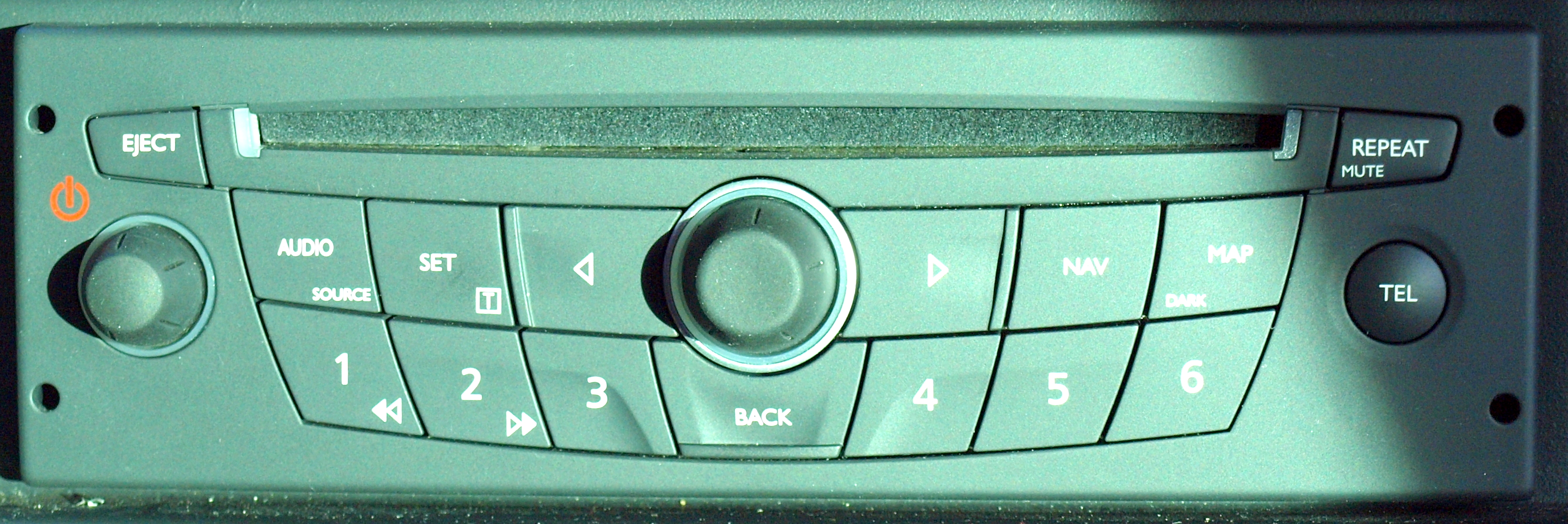
A Renault single DIN head unit which pairs with a separate screen

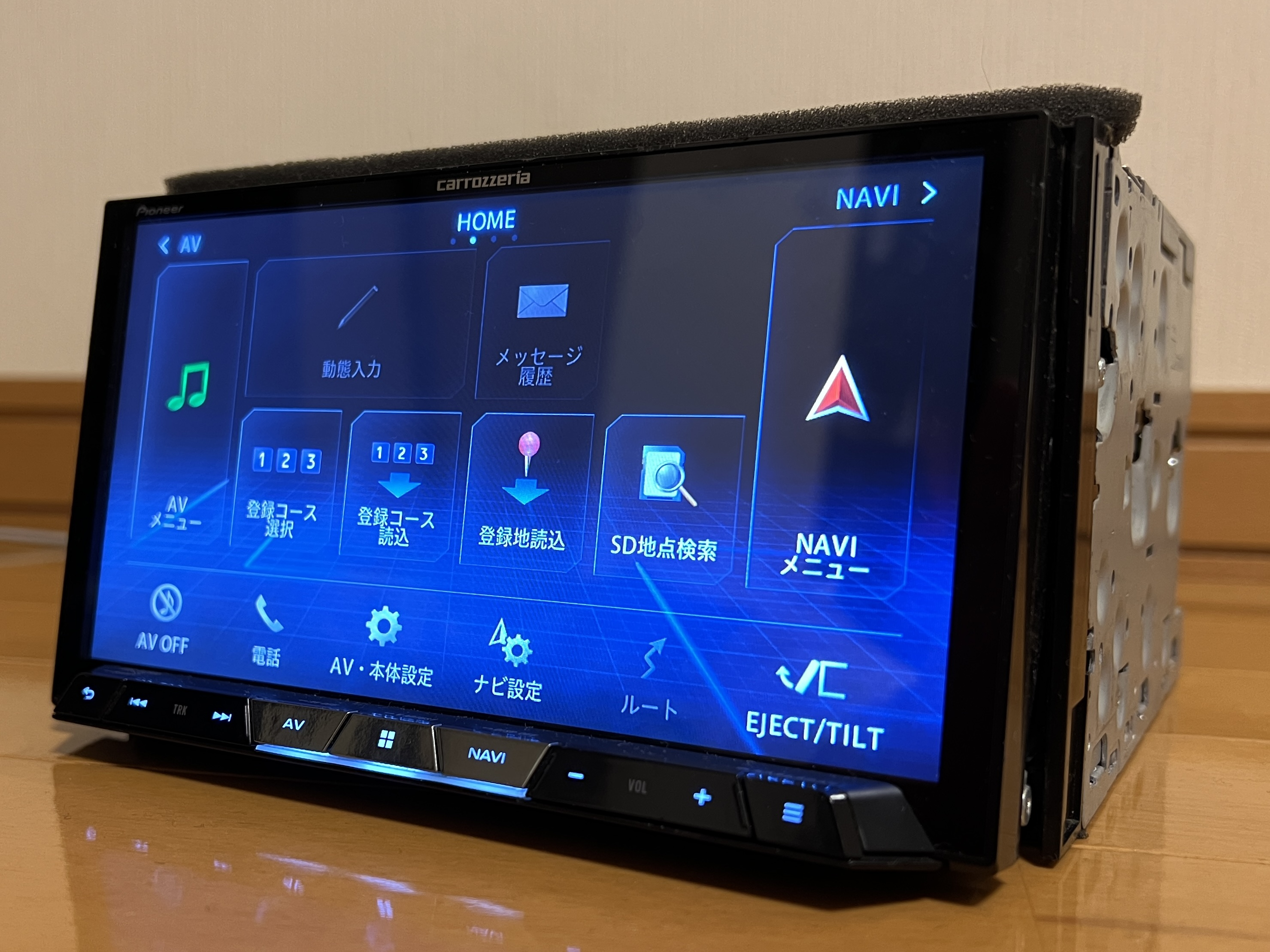
A double DIN head unit with a large touchscreen, DVD, 1seg and GNSS

An automotive head unit, sometimes called the infotainment system, is a vehicle audio component providing a unified hardware interface for the system, including screens, buttons and system controls for numerous integrated information and entertainment functions.

Other names for automotive head units include car stereo, car receiver, deck, in-dash stereo, and dash stereo.

== Function ==
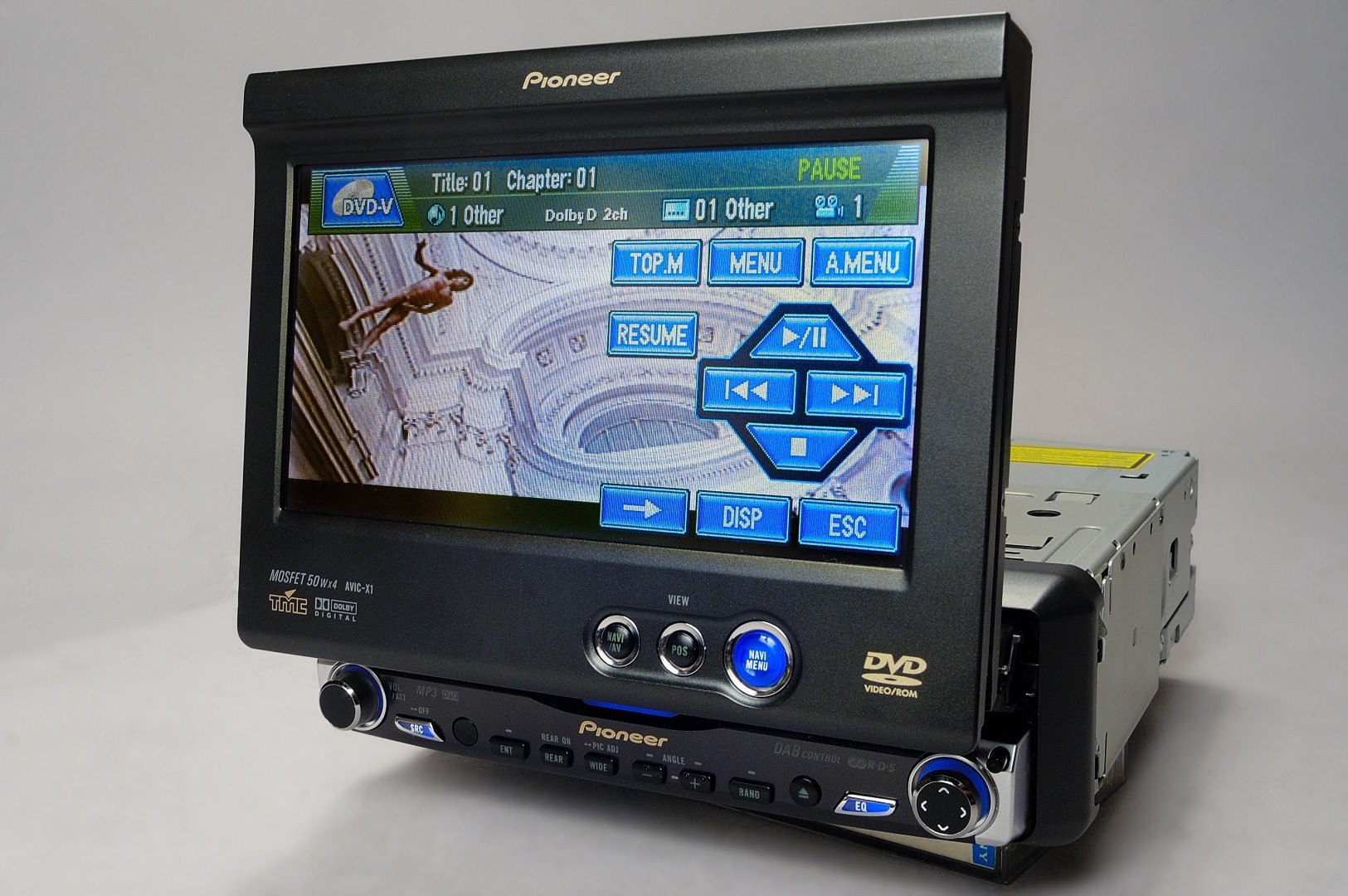
A single DIN head unit with a large retractable touchscreen, DVD and GNSS

Central to a vehicle's sound and information systems, head units are located prominently in the center of the dashboard or console, and provide an integrated electronic package.

The head unit provides a user interface for the vehicle's information and entertainment media components: AM/FM radio, satellite radio, DVDs/CDs, cassette tapes (although these are now uncommon), USB MP3, dashcams, GNSS navigation, Bluetooth, Wi-Fi, and sometimes vehicle systems status. Moreover, it may provide control of audio functions including volume, band, frequency, speaker balance, speaker fade, bass, treble, equalization, and so on. With the advent of dashcams, GNSS navigation, and DVDs, head units with video screens are widely available, integrating voice control and gesture recognition.

=== Size standards ===
An original standard head unit size is ISO 7736, developed by the Deutsches Institut für Normung (DIN):

Single DIN (180 mm × 50 mm or 7.09 in × 1.97 in) in Europe, South America, and Australasia

- A compact size that easily fits into a dashboard, but the unit is not tall enough to accommodate a video display.

Double DIN (180 mm × 100 mm or 7.09 in × 3.94 in) in Japan, the UK, and North America.

- Doubling the height of the single DIN, a video display or touchscreen can be fitted to support manufacturer GUIs, Android Auto, Huawei HiCar and/or Apple CarPlay.
- Double DIN is also written as 2 DIN and double din.

For both single and double DIN units, ISO 10487 is the connector standard for connecting the head unit to the car's electrical system.

=== Aftermarket brands ===
Manufacturers offer DIN headunits and standard connectors (called universal headunits), including Pioneer, Sony, Alpine, Kenwood, Eclipse, JVC, Peach Auto (Hong Kong), Boyo, Dual, Visteon, Advent and Blaupunkt.

== See also ==
- Aftermarket
- Android Auto
- CarPlay
- Huawei HiCar
