= Volkswagen ID. Era 9X =

Range extender full-size crossover SUV

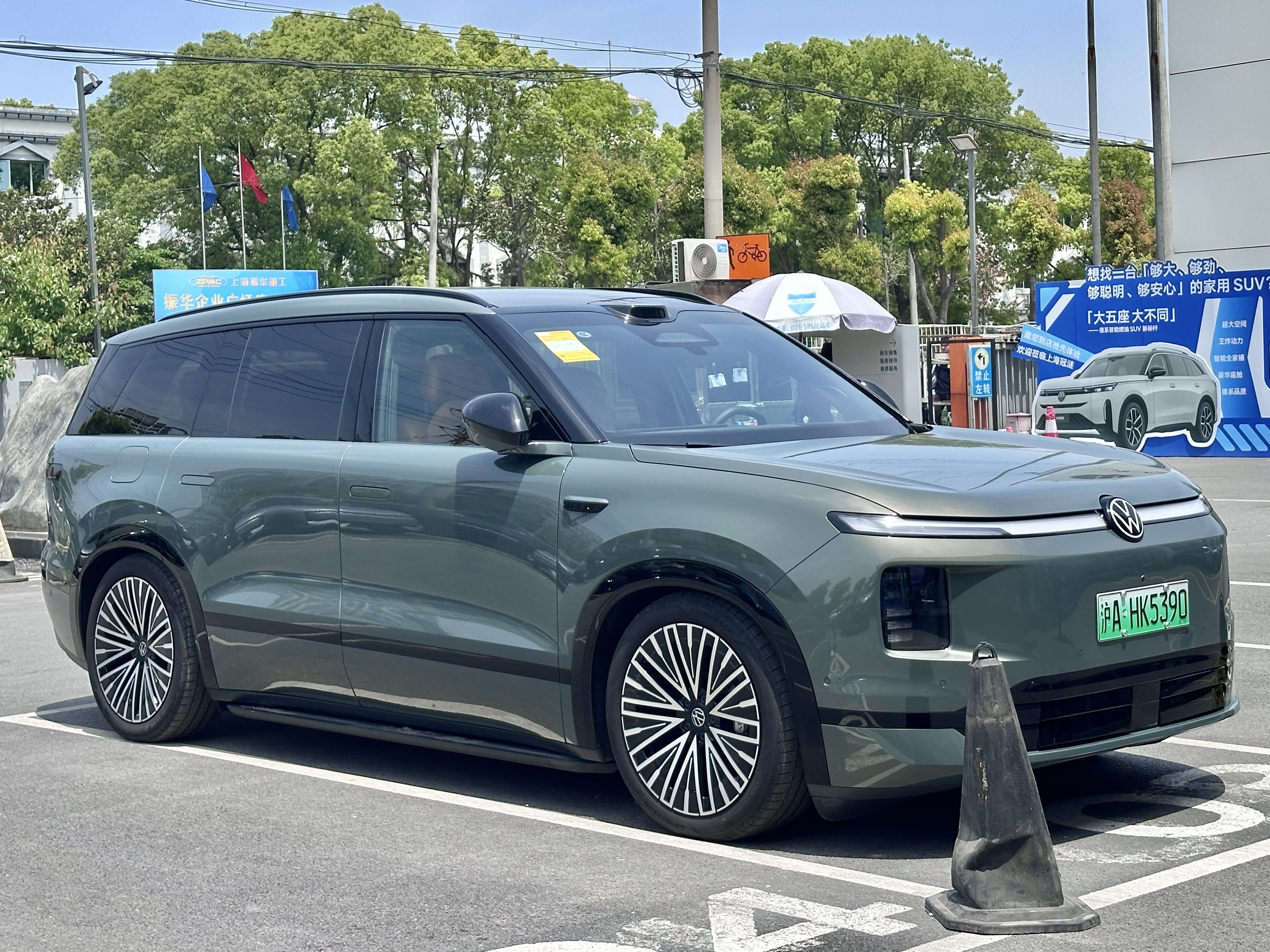

Overview
- Manufacturer: Volkswagen
- Production: March 2026 – present
- Assembly: China: Ningbo (SAIC-VW)

Body and chassis
- Class: Full-size SUV (F-segment)
- Body style: 5-door crossover SUV
- Layout: Front-engine, rear-motor, rear-wheel-drive; Front-engine, dual-motor, all-wheel-drive
- Related: IM LS8

Powertrain
- Engine: Petrol range extender: 1.5 L EA211-ERV turbo Miller cycle I4
- Power output: 295–510 hp (220–380 kW; 299–517 PS)
- Hybrid drivetrain: Series (EREV)
- Battery: 51.1 kWh CATL-SAIC LFP; 65.2 kWh CATL-SAIC NMC
- Range: 1,190–1,260 km (739–783 mi) (WLTC)
- Electric range: 255–340 km (158–211 mi) (WLTC); 347–406 km (216–252 mi) (CLTC)

Dimensions
- Wheelbase: 3,070 mm (120.9 in)
- Length: 5,207 mm (205.0 in)
- Width: 1,997 mm (78.6 in)
- Height: 1,810 mm (71.3 in)
- Curb weight: 2,600–2,700 kg (5,732–5,952 lb)

The Volkswagen ID. Era 9X (Chinese: 大众ID. ERA 9X; pinyin: Dàzhòng ID. ERA 9X) is a range extender full-size SUV produced by Volkswagen under its SAIC-VW joint venture. It is sold under Volkswagen's ID. Era sub-brand.

== Overview ==
The ID. Era 9X was first previewed by the ID. Era concept at the 2025 Shanghai Auto Show. Its exterior design was first revealed through MIIT filings on 8 January 2026. Prior to the reveal of the Era 9X it was speculated it would have a range of over 621.5 miles (1,000 km). It is Volkswagen's first range-extended EV and was developed specifically for the Chinese market, and developed based on a platform from SAIC Group. The Era 9X is also Volkswagen's largest SUV and is slightly longer than the BMW X7.

Production of the ID. Era 9X commenced on 5 March 2026. Sales of the ID. Era 9X began on 25 April 2026.

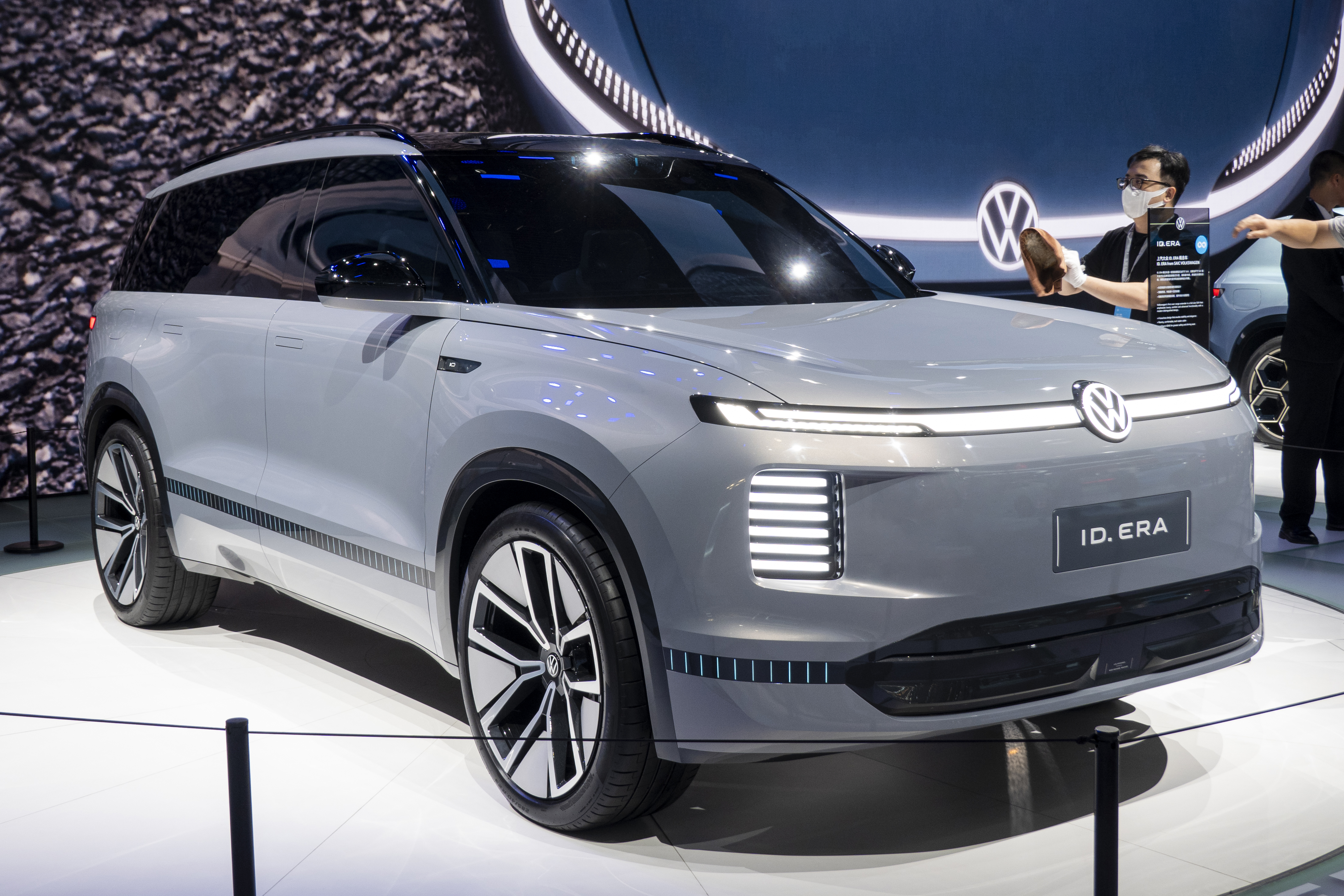
The Volkswagen ID. Era concept introduced at Auto Shanghai 2025 directly previewed the Era 9X.

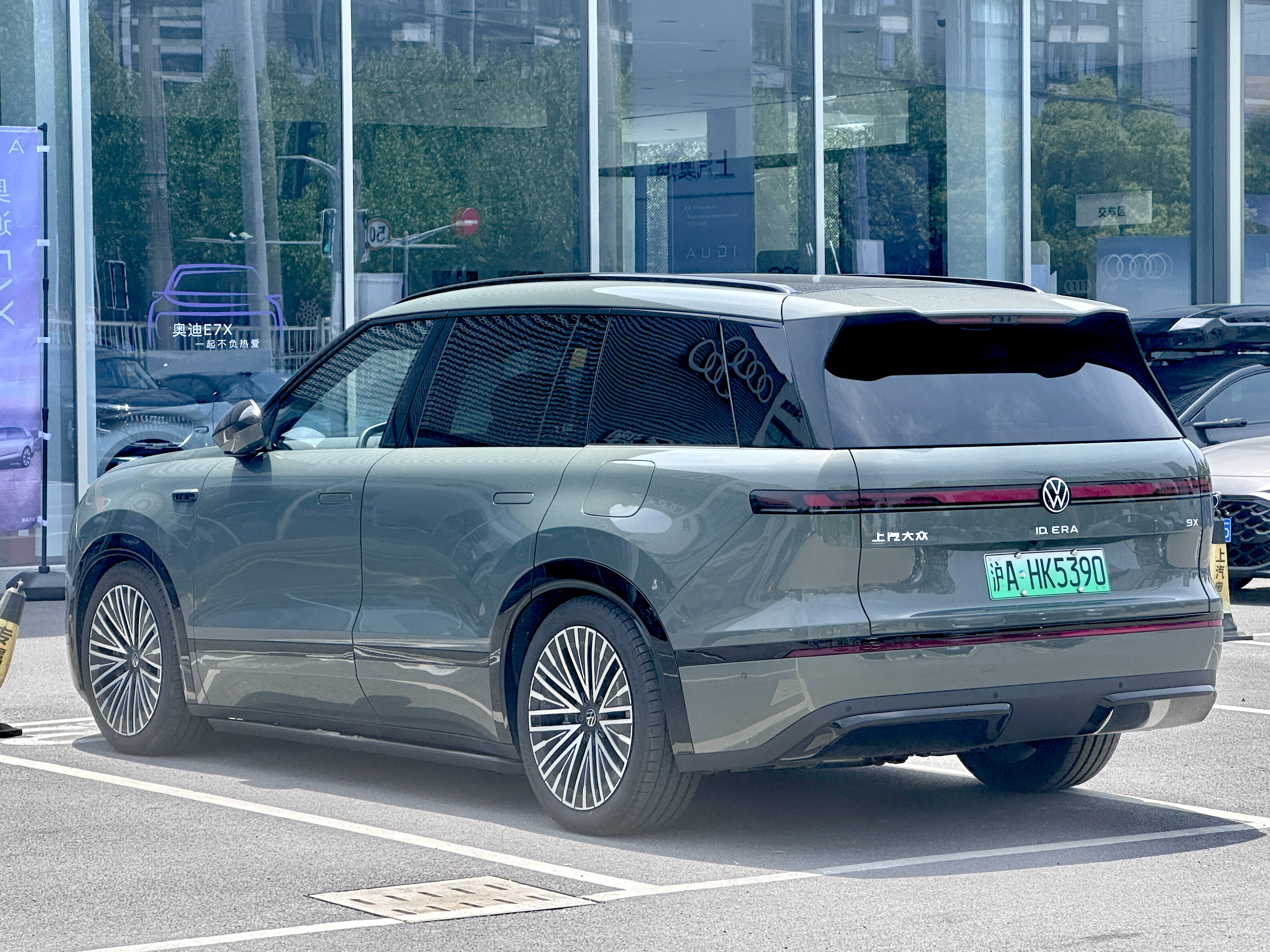
Rear view

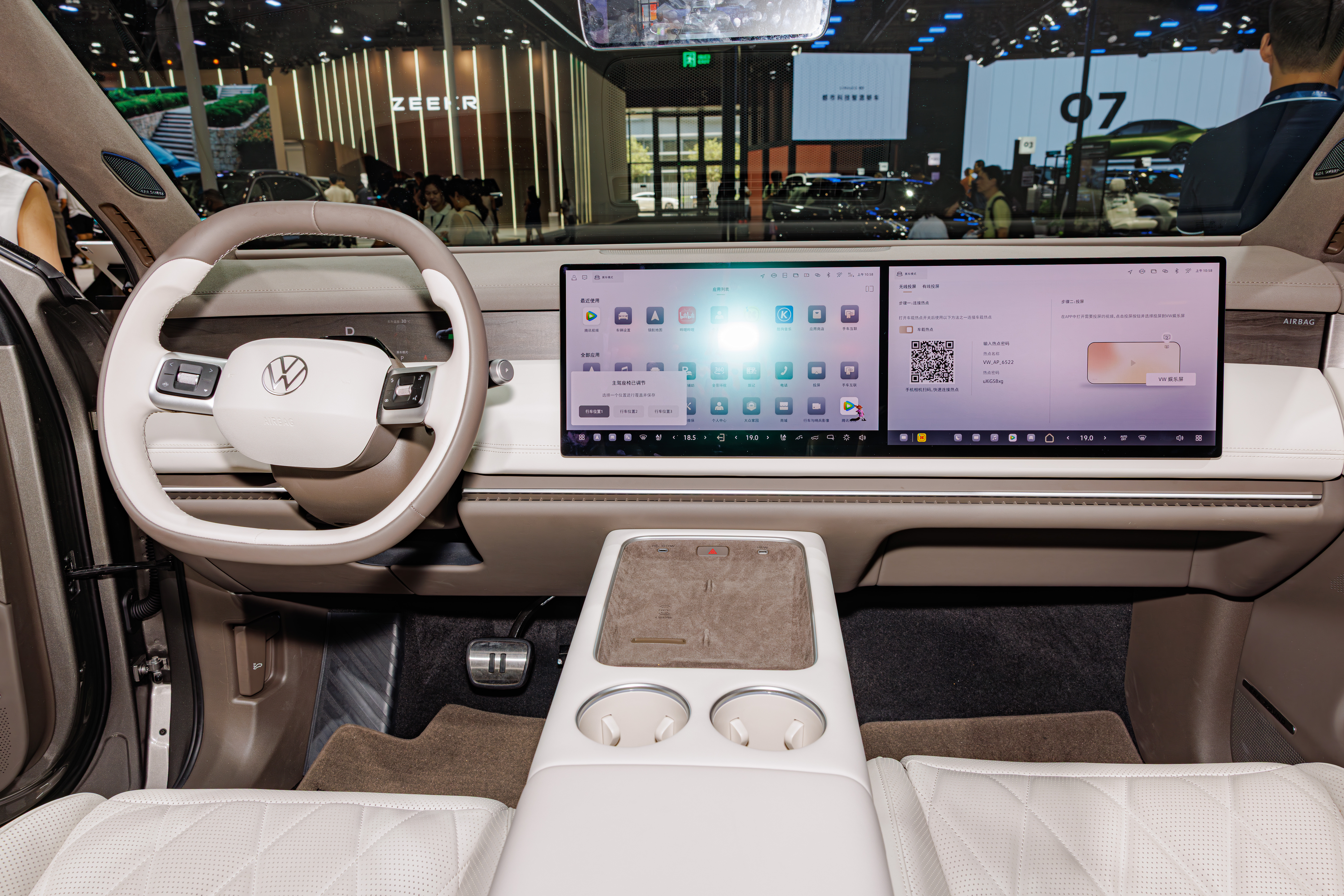
Interior

=== Design ===
A light strip is located below the hood. The front bumper integrates the headlight design. Multi-spoke chrome-plated rims are present. The rear also uses a full-width light strip as does the front as well as a roof spoiler. It has a slightly slanted roofline.

=== Features ===
The side of the 9X uses retractable door handles. There also is no radiator grille, the ERA 9X uses an active radiator intake for cooling the engine. A LiDAR sensor is also present above the windshield.

== Powertrain ==
The ID. Era 9X is a range-extended EV, meaning it is a series hybrid. It uses the EA211 1.5-litre inline-4 engine with variable geometry turbocharger as a generator producing 141 hp (105 kW; 143 PS) at 4,500rpm and 240 N⋅m (177 lb⋅ft) from 1,750–4,000rpm. Rear-wheel-drive models produce 295 hp (220 kW; 299 PS) and the all-wheel-drive model adds a 215 hp (160 kW; 218 PS) front motor for a total of 510 hp (380 kW; 517 PS). The base rear-wheel-drive model uses a 51.1 kWh lithium iron phosphate battery developed by both CATL and SAIC weighing 390 kg (860 lb) and gets an electric range of 267 km (166 mi). The mid-range rear-wheel-drive model and the all-wheel-drive model use a 65.2 kWh nickel manganese cobalt battery weighing 387 kg (853 lb) and also developed by CATL and SAIC. The electric range of the 65.2 kWh RWD model exceeds 400 km (249 mi) and the electric range of the AWD model is 321 km (199 mi). Rear-wheel-drive and all-wheel-drive models have CLTC fuel consumption ratings of around 5.95 L/100 km (39.5 mpg_{‑US}) and 6.27 L/100 km (37.5 mpg_{‑US}) respectively when driving on a fully depleted battery.

At launch, the ID. Era 9X is only available in all-wheel drive with either battery pack.

Specifications
Battery		Engine	Motor		Power	Torque			Electric range		Total range		10–80% time	0–100 km/h (62 mph)	Top speed	Kerb weight
Type	Weight	Engine	Front	Rear	Power	Front	Rear	Total	WLTP	CLTC	WLTP	CLTC	10–80% time	0–100 km/h (62 mph)	Top speed	Kerb weight
51.1 kWh LFP Zenergy	390 kg (860 lb)	141 hp (105 kW; 143 PS) EA211-ERV	150 kW PMSM	240 kW TZ210XS1131 PMSM	496 hp (370 kW; 503 PS)	240 N⋅m (177 lb⋅ft)	420 N⋅m (310 lb⋅ft)	660 N⋅m (487 lb⋅ft)	255 km (158 mi)	347 km (216 mi)	1,190 km (739 mi)	1,611 km (1,001 mi)	19 min	5.6 sec	200 km/h (124 mph)	2,680 kg (5,908 lb)
65.2 kWh NMC CATL	387 kg (853 lb)	141 hp (105 kW; 143 PS) EA211-ERV	160 kW TZ180XY02A PMSM	240 kW TZ210XS1131 PMSM	509 hp (380 kW; 516 PS)	240 N⋅m (177 lb⋅ft)	420 N⋅m (310 lb⋅ft)	660 N⋅m (487 lb⋅ft)	321 km (199 mi)	406 km (252 mi)	1,260 km (783 mi)	1,651 km (1,026 mi)	17 min	5.6 sec	200 km/h (124 mph)	2,700 kg (5,952 lb)

== Sales ==
On 12 May 2026, SAIC-Volkswagen announced that the ID. Era 9X sales reached 2,326 units in the five days following its launch on 25 April 2026.

== See also ==
- Volkswagen ID. series
- Volkswagen ID. Era
