= Android Auto =

Mobile app providing a vehicle-optimized user interface

- Android Auto's UI
- Developer: Google
- Release: March 19, 2015; 11 years ago
- Stable release: 18.1 (Build 6644) / November 10, 2026; 2 days ago
- Operating system: Android 9+
- Type: Telematics
- License: Proprietary
- Website: www.android.com/auto/

Android Auto is a mobile app developed by Google to mirror features of a smartphone (or other Android device) on a car's dashboard information and entertainment head unit.

Once an Android device is paired with the car's head unit, the system can mirror some apps on the vehicle's display. Supported apps include GPS mapping and navigation, music playback, SMS, telephone, and Web search. The system supports both touchscreen and button-controlled head units. Hands-free operation through voice commands is available and recommended to reduce driver distraction.

Android Auto is part of the Open Automotive Alliance, a joint effort of 28 automobile manufacturers, with Nvidia as tech supplier, available in 36 countries.

== History ==
Android Auto was revealed at Google I/O 2014. The app was released to the public on March 19, 2015. In November 2016, Google implemented an app that would run the Android Auto UI on the mobile device. In July 2019, Android Auto received its first major UI rework, which among other changes, brought an app drawer to Android Auto for the first time. Google also announced that the app's ability to be used on a phone would be discontinued in favor of Google Assistant's drive mode.

In December 2020, Google announced the expansion of Android Auto to 36 additional countries in Europe, Indonesia, and more. In April 2021, Android Auto launched in Belgium, Denmark, Netherlands, Norway, Portugal, and Sweden. Google announced in May 2022 a user interface redesign for Android Auto, codenamed CoolWalk, which aims to simplify the app's usage, and make it more adaptable to screens of different orientations and aspect ratios. The redesign incorporates a new split-screen layout, where Google Maps can be displayed alongside a music player. CoolWalk was originally slated to launch in Q3 2022. In June 2022, Android Auto no longer ran directly on a mobile device; the app permitting this was decommissioned, in favor of a Driving Mode built into the Google Assistant app for a similar purpose. In November 2022, the CoolWalk user interface was released in Android Auto's beta program.

== Functionality ==
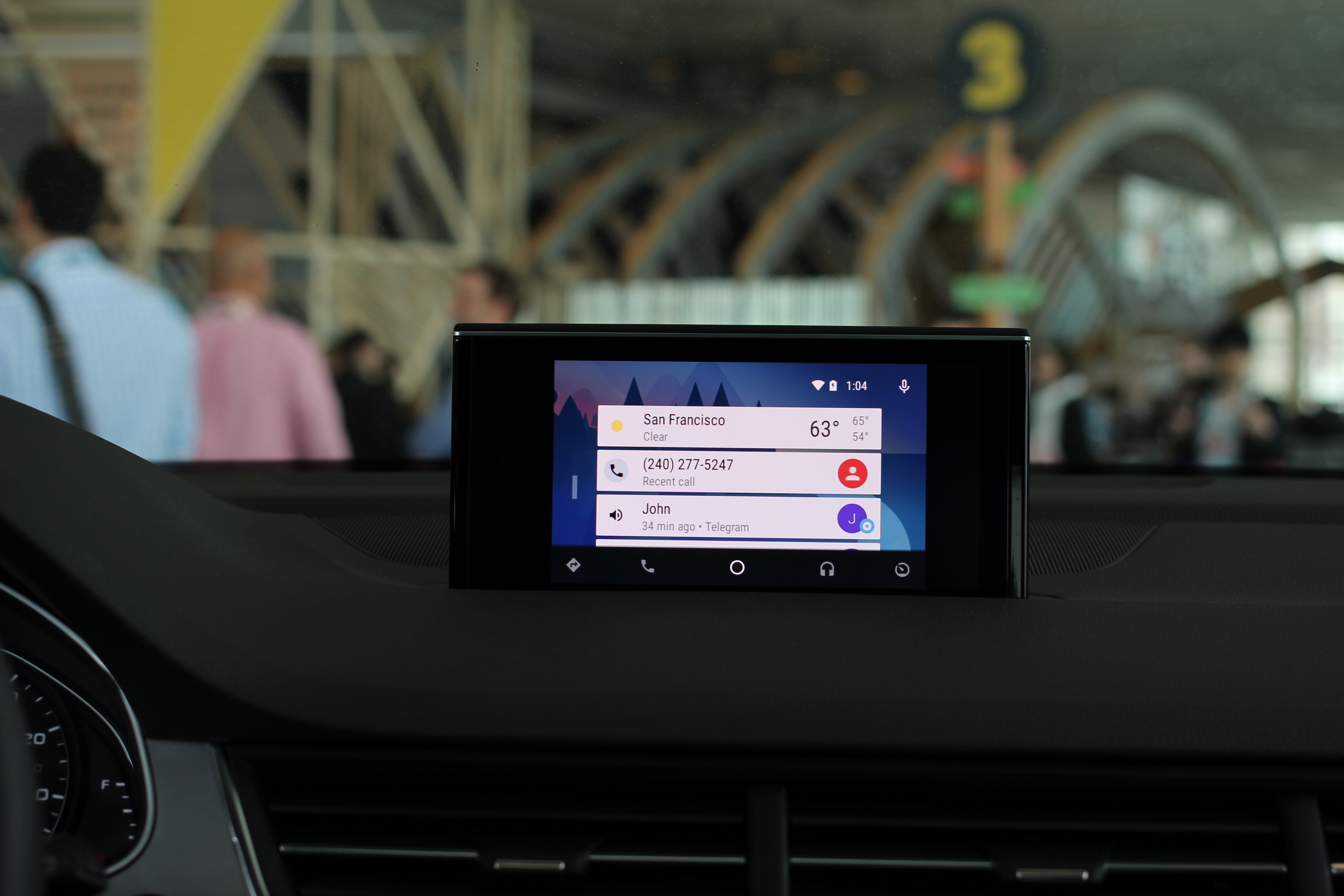
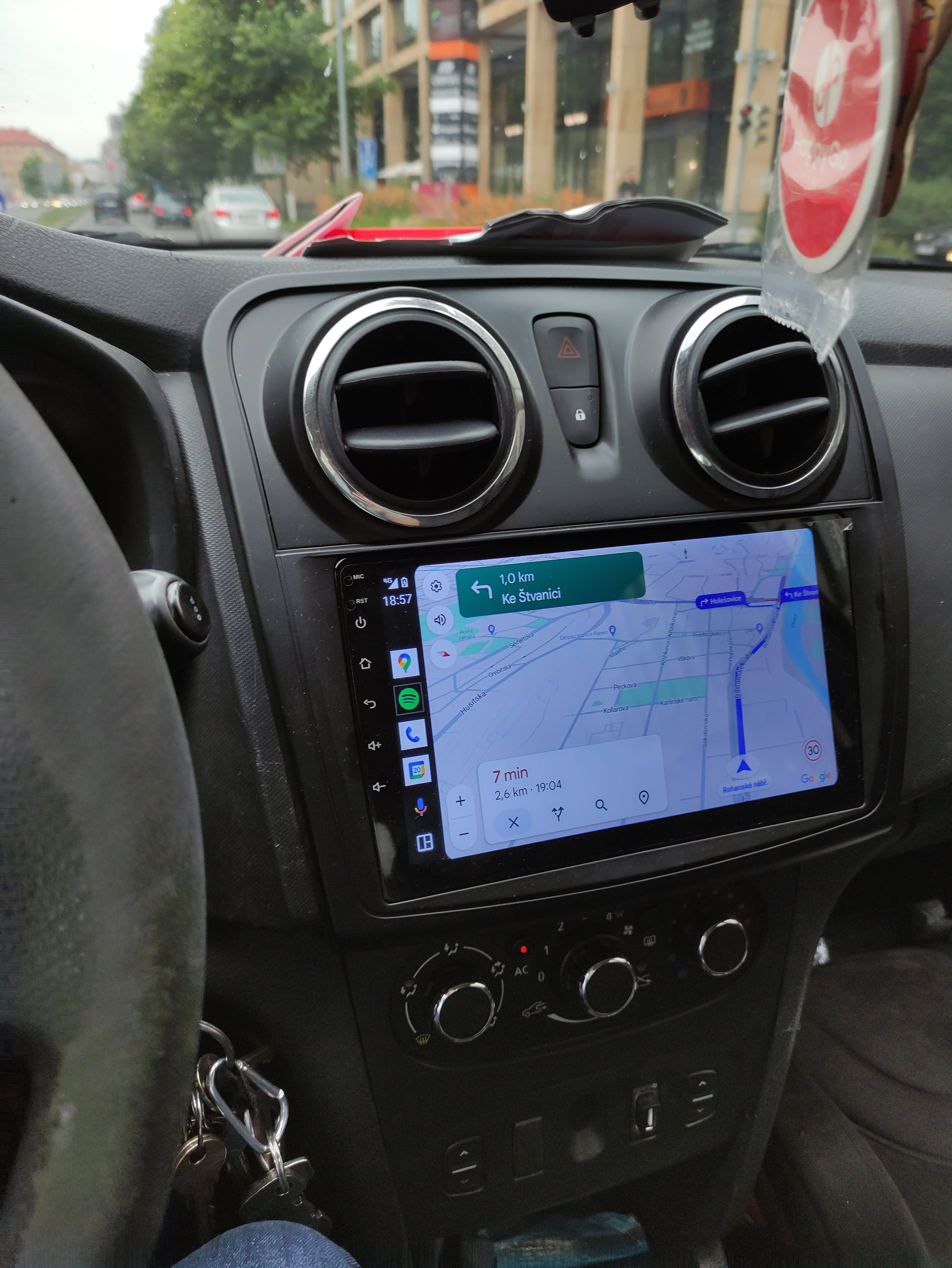
Left: an automotive head unit showing Android Auto on the car's dashboard; right: a Dacia Logan MCV 2 fitted with onboard Android Auto unit showing Google Maps

Android Auto is software that can be utilized from an Android mobile device, acting as a vehicle's dashboard head unit. Once the user's Android device is connected to the vehicle, the head unit will serve as an external display for the Android device, presenting supported software in a car-specific user interface provided by the Android Auto app. In Android Auto's first iterations, the device was required to be connected via USB to the car.

For some time, starting in November 2016, Google added the option to run Android Auto as a regular app on an Android device, allowing users to choose whether to use Android Auto on a personal phone or tablet, rather than on a compatible automotive head unit. This app was decommissioned in June 2022 in favor of a Driving Mode built into the Google Assistant app. At CES 2018, Google confirmed that the Google Assistant would be coming to Android Auto later in the year.

An Android Auto SDK has been released, allowing third parties to modify their apps to work with Android Auto; initially, only APIs for music and messaging apps were available.

== Head unit support ==
In May 2015, Hyundai became the first manufacturer to offer Android Auto support, making it first available in the 2015 Hyundai Sonata. Automobile manufacturers that will offer Android Auto support in their cars include Abarth, Acura, Alfa Romeo, Aston Martin, Audi, Bentley, Buick, BMW, BYD, Cadillac, Chevrolet, Chrysler, Citroën, Dodge, Ferrari, Fiat, Ford, GMC, Genesis, Holden, Honda, Hyundai, Infiniti, Jaguar Land Rover, Jeep, KGM, Kia, Lamborghini, Leapmotor, Lexus, Lincoln, Mahindra, Maserati, Maybach, Mazda, Mercedes-Benz, Mitsubishi, Nissan, Opel, Peugeot, Porsche, Ram, Renault, SEAT, Škoda, Subaru, Suzuki, Tata, Toyota, Volkswagen and Volvo.

Additionally, aftermarket car-audio systems supporting Android Auto add the technology into host vehicles, including Pioneer, Kenwood, Panasonic, and Sony.

== Criticism ==
In May 2019, Italy filed an antitrust complaint targeting Android Auto, citing a Google policy of allowing third-parties to only offer media and messaging apps on the platform, preventing Enel from offering an app for locating vehicle charging stations.

Google announced a new SDK, to be released to select partners in August 2020 and made generally available by the end of the year.

== Availability ==
As of December 2025, Android Auto is available in 46 countries:

- Argentina
- Australia
- Austria
- Belgium
- Bolivia
- Brazil
- Canada
- Chile
- Colombia
- Costa Rica
- Denmark
- Dominican Republic
- Ecuador
- France
- Germany
- Guatemala
- India
- Indonesia
- Ireland
- Italy
- Japan
- Mexico
- Netherlands
- New Zealand
- Norway
- Panama
- Paraguay
- Peru
- Philippines
- Poland
- Portugal
- Puerto Rico
- Russia
- Singapore
- South Africa
- South Korea
- Spain
- Sweden
- Switzerland
- Taiwan
- Thailand
- Turkey
- United Kingdom
- United States
- Uruguay
- Venezuela

== See also ==
- Apple CarPlay
- Toyota Entune
- MirrorLink
- Huawei HiCar
- Android Automotive
- Ford Sync
