= Milbert Amplifiers =

American manufacturer of high-end audio equipment

- Industry: Electronics industry
- Founded: 1986
- Headquarters: Gaithersburg, Maryland, United States
- Website: milbert.com

Milbert Amplifiers is an American electronics manufacturer based in Gaithersburg, Maryland.

== History and products ==
Milbert manufactures audio equipments. It introduces its mobile vacuum-tube audio amplifier in 1986, which has been followed by several models collectively in continuous production for nearly 30 years. The company also produces vacuum-tube guitar and musical amplifiers using unique impedance conversion which is claimed to prolong tube operating lifetimes.
