= Ford Escape =

Compact crossover SUV manufactured by Ford

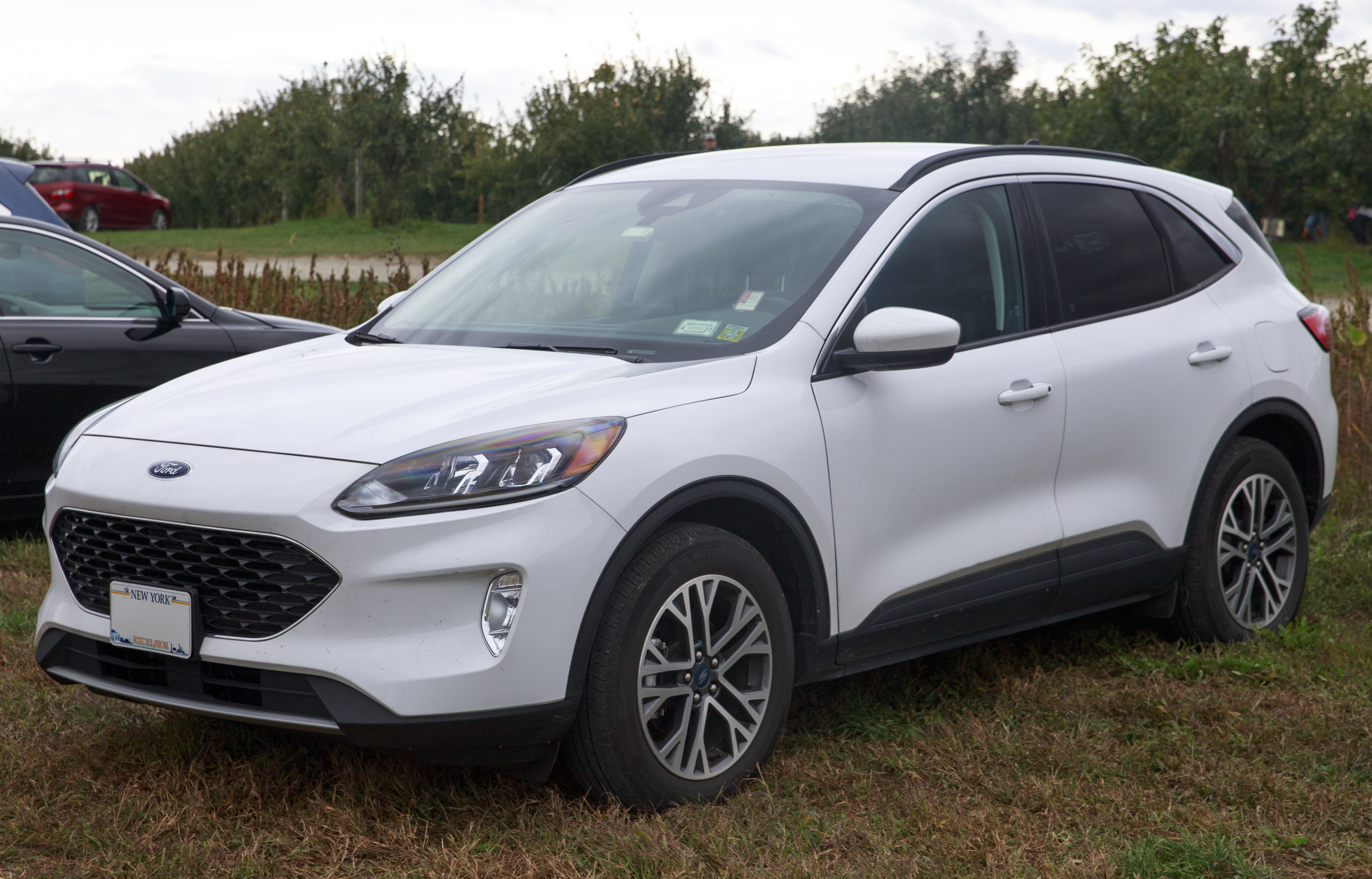
- 2021 Escape Hybrid (US)

Overview
- Manufacturer: Ford Motor Company
- Also called: Ford Kuga (2013–present); Ford Maverick (2001–2008); Mazda Tribute (2001–2011); Mercury Mariner (2005–2011)
- Production: 2000–2025 (North America); 2016–2026 (Spain)
- Model years: 2001–2026 (North America)

Body and chassis
- Class: Compact crossover SUV
- Body style: 5-door SUV
- Layout: Front-engine, front-wheel-drive; Front-engine, four-wheel-drive

Chronology
- Predecessor: Ford Maverick (Europe)
- Successor: Ford Territory (Middle East (excluding Israel), Africa, Latin America, Taiwan, and Southeast Asia (excluding Singapore))

The Ford Escape is a compact crossover SUV manufactured and marketed by the Ford Motor Company from the 2001 to the 2026 model years across four generations, as Ford's first SUV derived from a car platform.

Introduced for model year 2005, the Escape's hybrid electric variant was both Ford's first hybrid-electric vehicle and the first hybrid SUV in the U.S. market by any manufacturer. The Escape was sized between the Ford EcoSport and Ford Edge.

The first two generations used the Ford CD2 platform, jointly developed with Mazda, and was co-developed with two rebadged variants, the Mazda Tribute and Mercury Mariner. All three were marketed in North America, although the Mariner was not marketed in Canada. The Escape was marketed in Europe as the Ford Maverick for model years 2001- 2008.

Under the mid-2000s "One Ford" globalization strategy, the third and fourth-generation designs of the Escape were co-developed with the Ford Kuga, designed by Ford of Europe. Sharing a common body and chassis underpinnings (and several engines), the Escape and Kuga are manufactured in their respective home markets. As with previous generations, the fourth-generation Escape was offered with gasoline, hybrid, and plug-in hybrid options. Outside of North America, the Ford Escape is marketed in Australia, China, and Taiwan.

In August 2025, it was announced that Ford would discontinue the Escape after model year 2026.

== First generation (2001) ==
First generation
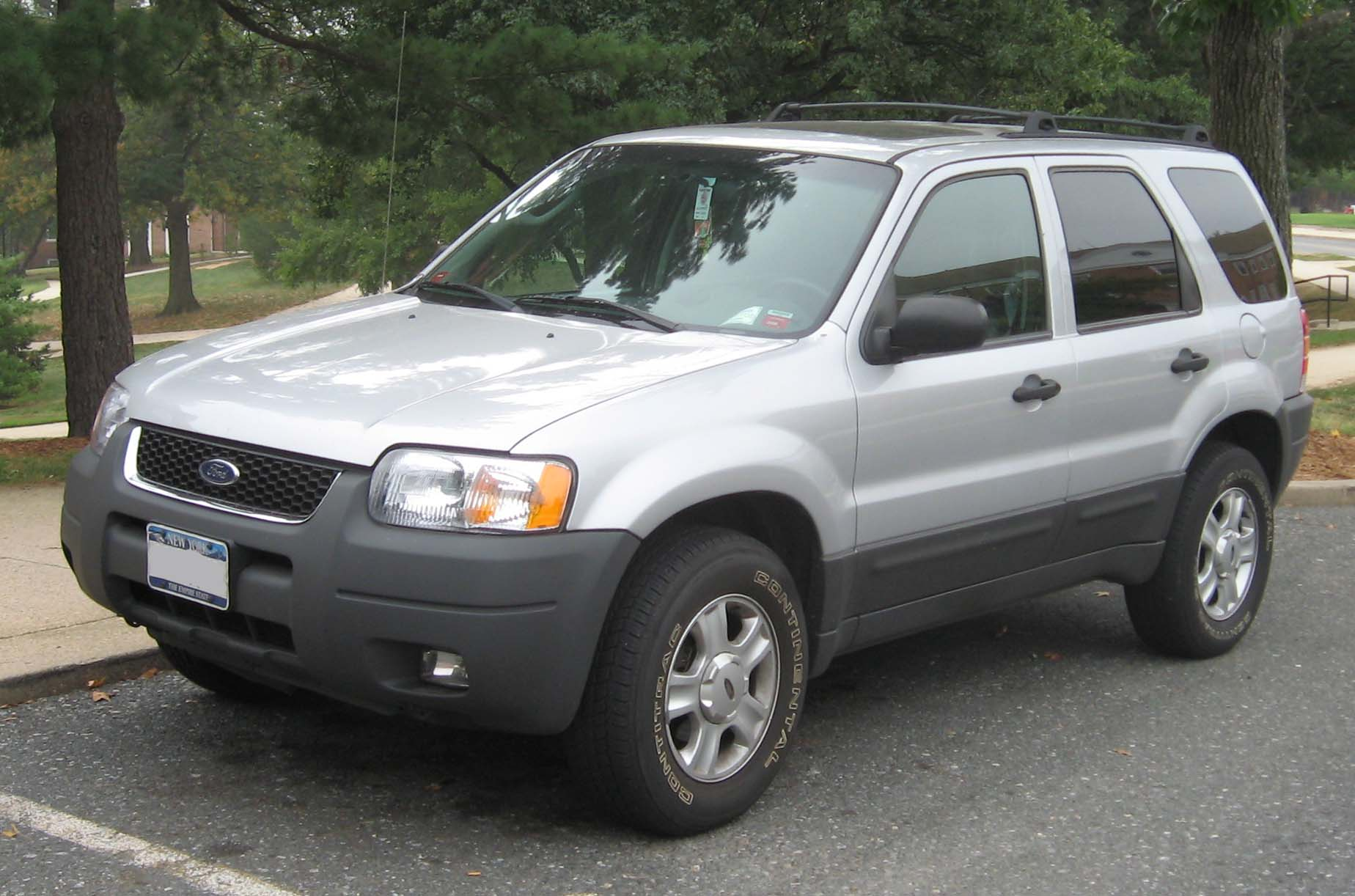

Overview
- Also called: Ford Maverick (Europe and China, 2001–2005); Mazda Tribute (2000–2008); Mercury Mariner (2004–2007)
- Production: April 2000 – December 2006; 2001–2012 (Asia-Pacific)
- Model years: 2001–2007
- Assembly: United States: Avon Lake, Ohio (OHAP); Claycomo, Missouri (KCAP); Japan: Hōfu (Mazda); Malaysia: Shah Alam (AMI); Philippines: Santa Rosa, Laguna (Ford Philippines); Taiwan: Zhongli (Ford Lio Ho); Vietnam: Hai Duong (Ford Vietnam)
- Designer: Laurens van den Acker (1997)

Body and chassis
- Platform: Ford CD2 platform

Powertrain
- Engine: Gasoline: 2.0 L Zetec I4; 2.3 L Duratec 23 I4; 3.0 L Duratec 30 V6; Gasoline Hybrid: 2.5 L Atkinson cycle I4
- Transmission: 5-speed G5M manual; 4-speed CD4E automatic; 4-speed GF4AX-EL automatic; Hybrid: planetary gear

Dimensions
- Wheelbase: 103.1 in (2,619 mm)
- Length: 2001–04: 173.0 in (4,394 mm); 2005–07: 174.9 in (4,442 mm)
- Width: 70.1 in (1,781 mm)
- Height: 2001–04: 69.1 in (1,755 mm); 2005–07: 69.7 in (1,770 mm); Hybrid: 69.7 in (1,770 mm)
- Curb weight: 2WD: 3,247 lb (1,473 kg); 4WD: 3,457 lb (1,568 kg)

Chronology
- Successor: Ford Kuga (Europe)

The first generation of Ford Escape was released in the year 2000 for the 2001 model year, jointly developed with Mazda, in which Ford owned a controlling interest. The Escape was released simultaneously with the Mazda Tribute, which shared the Ford CD2 platform (based on Mazda GF underpinnings). Engines and automatic transmissions were supplied by Ford, with Mazda providing the manual gearboxes. At first, the two models were assembled by Ford in the US for North America, with Mazda in Japan supplying cars for other markets. This followed a long history of Mazda-derived Fords, starting with the Ford Courier in the 1970s.

At the time, larger sport-utility vehicles tended to use pickup truck–based, body-on-frame designs. Other car makers, Jeep, Toyota and Honda had been offering smaller unibody designs, the Jeep Cherokee (XJ), RAV4, and CR-V respectively. Solid rear axles were commonly used on the full-sized truck-based SUVs and Jeep Cherokee due to their ability to carry heavy loads at the expense of a comfortable ride and good handling. Ford and Mazda decided to offer a car-like, unibody design with a fully independent suspension and rack and pinion steering similar to the RAV4 and CR-V in the Escape. Although not meant for serious off-roading, a full-time all-wheel-drive (AWD) system supplied by Dana was optional, which included a locking center differential activated by a switch on the dashboard. The AWD system normally sends most of the power from the engine to the front wheels. If slipping is detected at the front, more power will be sent to the rear wheels in a fraction of a second. The four wheel drive system was a newer version of Ford's "Control Trac" 4x4 system, dubbed the Control Trac II 4WD in the Escape. This system allowed the front wheels to receive 100% of the torque until a slip was detected. Using a Rotary Blade Coupling, the rear wheels could be sent up to 100% of the power in fractions of a second. When switching the system from "Auto" to "On," the front and rear axles are locked at a 50/50 split; the reaction time necessary to engage the rear wheels is reduced via an integrated bypass clutch. The Control Trac II system allows for a four-wheel drive vehicle without the use of a center differential. The entire braking system was built by Continental Teves, including the ABS and various related suspension components.

Ford also sold the first generation Escape in Europe and China as the Ford Maverick, replacing the previous Nissan-sourced model. For the 2005 model year, Ford's Mercury brand introduced the rebadged version as the Mariner, marketed in the UnA. and Mexico. The first-generation Escape remains notable as the first SUV to offer a hybrid drivetrain option, released in 2004 for the 2005 model year to North American markets only. CKD production began in 2002 at Ford Lio Ho Motor Co. in Taiwan for various Asian markets. The Tribute's suspension was tuned for a firmer ride than the Escape.

Mainstream production of the first generation Escape/Tribute ended in late 2006. For Asia-Pacific markets, both received respective facelifts in 2006 and had production fully transferred to Ford Lio Ho in Taiwan. Extended production of the Mazda lasted until 2010, and until 2012 for Ford.

=== Ford Escape ===
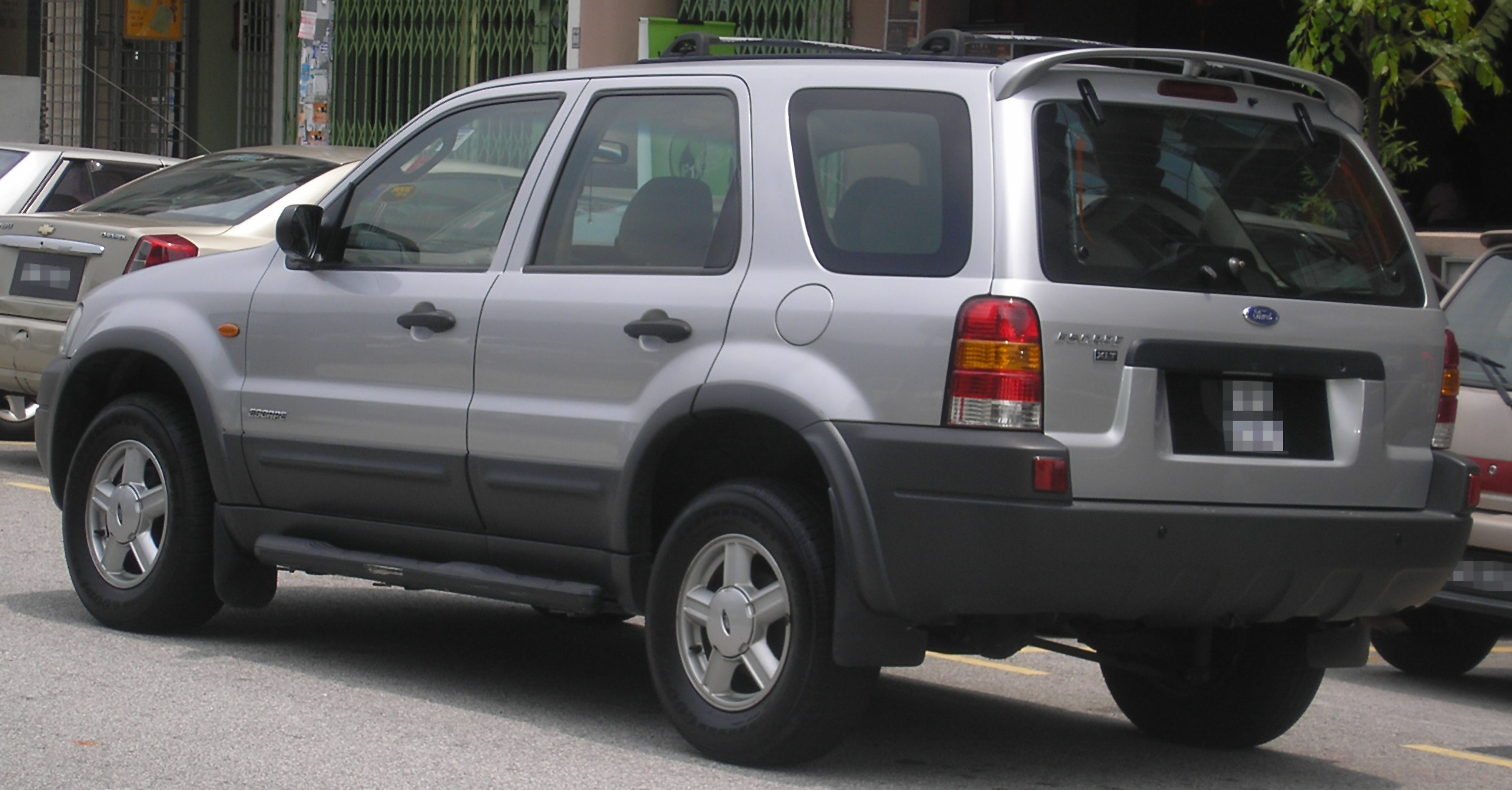
2001–2007 Ford Escape

==== 2000–2004 (BA, ZA) ====
In North America, it slotted below the larger, truck-based Explorer in Ford's lineup, but was marginally larger than the small SUV offerings from Honda and Toyota. Although it is technically a crossover vehicle, it is marketed by Ford as part of its traditional SUV lineup (Escape, Explorer, Expedition) rather than its separate crossover lineup (Edge, Flex) due to its more conventional SUV styling.

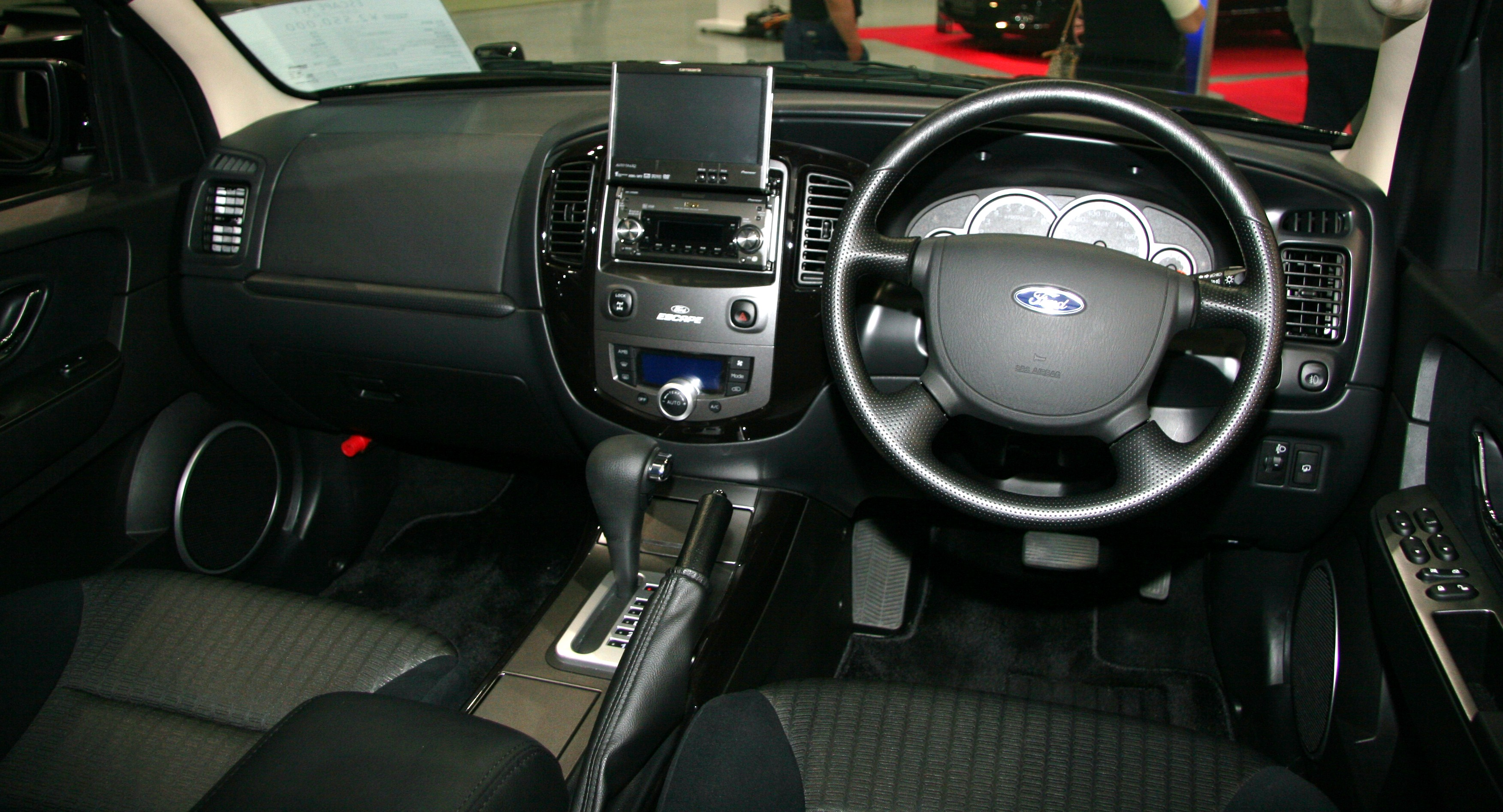
Right-hand drive interior

From 2001 to 2004, the Ford Escape was sold in Europe under the Maverick name, and replaced a rebadged version of the Nissan Mistral/Terrano II. Only two versions were made, the 2.0 L Zetec inline-4 engine with manual transmission and 3.0 L Duratec V6 with automatic transmission, both using gasoline. The absence of a diesel version did not help sales and the vehicle was temporarily discontinued in late 2003. However, the Maverick, in the UK for example, was only available in XLT trim. Plus, the dashboard was not the same as the US Escape; it was instead taken from the Mazda Tribute. The Maverick was reintroduced in 2005 in certain European markets with the Duratec V6 engine. The Maverick was assembled in Russia for the Russian market. As of 2006, the Maverick was no longer sold in Europe, leaving Ford without a compact SUV until the 2008 Ford Kuga was introduced. The Maverick was primarily designed for on-road use – sold with normal road tires, and to be used with front-wheel drive most of the time.

In the Philippines, Ford introduced the Escape in 2001. It originally came in two grades; "XLS" and "XLT", but by early 2004, Ford axed the "XLT" (all-wheel drive model) and replaced it with the newly-introduced "V6" trim. The "XLS" is powered by Ford's 2.3L Duratec inline-four engine paired to a 4-speed automatic. It came with keyless entry, fabric upholstery, 4 speakers, and six-CD audio system, among other features. The "V6" is powered by Ford's 3.0L V6 engine paired to a 4-speed automatic. It featured a power moon roof, leather upholstery, automatic seat adjusters and recliners, keyless entry, and immobilizer.

==== Safety ====
Crash-test results for the Escape have been mixed. In the New Car Assessment Program administered by the US-based National Highway Traffic Safety Administration, the car received five out of five stars for driver protection and four out of five stars for passenger protection in a 35 mph (56 km/h) frontal impact. The SUV received five stars for both driver and rear passenger in the side impact test. In the Insurance Institute for Highway Safety's 40 mph (64 km/h) frontal offset test, 2001–2004 Escapes received a score of "Marginal". In the side impact crash test, vehicles equipped with the optional side air bags received a score of "Good" in the 31 mph (50 km/h), while those without the optional air bags received a score of "Poor".

All Escapes are equipped with a passive 'Immobiliser' called SecuriLock. This feature includes an RFID chip embedded in the key, which the car reads each time the driver inserts the key. If the key does not provide a valid confirmation signal, the vehicle does not run, even if the key is perfectly cut to match the original. Theft, injury, and collision losses reported to insurance companies for the Escape are among the lowest in its class.

ANCAP test results* Ford Escape variants with 2 airbags (2005)
Test	Score
Overall	4 /5 stars
Frontal offset	8.67/16
Side impact	16/16
Pole	0/2
Seat belt reminders	0/3
Whiplash protection	Not Assessed
Pedestrian protection	Not Assessed
Electronic stability control	Not Assessed

==== North America ====
In the United States, all Escapes included standard equipment such as power windows with an automatic driver-door window, power door locks, anti-lock braking system (ABS), keyless entry, a folding rear-bench seat, 16-inch wheels, and air conditioning. In addition, an Escape buyer could choose from one of several different trim levels that were available, which included:

XLS (2001–2007): As the most basic trim level of the Escape, the XLS included: the 2.0-liter Zetec (2001–2004) and the 2.3-liter Duratec (2005–2007) engines, a five-speed manual transmission, 15-inch steel wheels, an AM/FM stereo with cassette and CD players (later, just a single-CD player in 2005, adding MP3 capability in 2007 along with SIRIUS) and four speakers, high-back front bucket seats, and cloth-and-vinyl seating surfaces. Options included 15- or 16-inch alloy wheels and the 3.0-liter V6 engine (2001–2004) mated to a four-speed automatic transmission (some of which were available as the XLS Popular Group). Four-wheel drive was not available with the four-cylinder engine for the 2004 model year.

XLT (2001–2007): As the top-of-the-line trim level of the Escape for 2001, and the most popular trim level of the Escape throughout its entire run (2001–2007), the XLT added the following equipment to the base XLS trim level: 16-inch alloy wheels, security alarm, cloth seating surfaces, and an enhanced interior. Options included an AM/FM stereo with a six-disc, in-dash CD changer (which later became standard equipment on all Escapes), a power sunroof, leather-and-vinyl-trimmed seating surfaces, and the seven-speaker premium audio system with amplifier and rear-mounted subwoofer. All 2002–2007 XLT and higher models came with a four-speed automatic transmission, with such models from 2002 to 2004 also coming standard with the 3.0-liter V6 engine.

XLT Sport (2002–2007): The XLT Sport was one of the more popular trim levels of the Escape from 2002 to 2007. It included all standard XLT equipment, plus V6 engine, automatic transmission, sport interior trim, and 16-inch machined alloy wheels. Options were the same as the standard XLT trim level, except that a power moonroof was not available until 2005.

Limited (2003–2007): As the top-of-the-line trim level of the Escape from 2003 to 2007, the Limited trim level added the following equipment to the XLT Sport trim level: an AM/FM stereo with six-disc in-dash CD/MP3 changer, the seven-speaker premium audio system with amplifier and rear-mounted subwoofer, low-back front bucket seats, leather-trimmed seating surfaces, dual power heated front bucket seats, a security system, color-keyed exterior trim, luxury interior trim, and a unique front grille. Options were limited, but included a power moonroof.

Hybrid (2005–2007): Based on the mid-range XLT trim level, the Hybrid included: the 2.3-liter Duratec inline-four engine with a continuously variable transmission and electric motor, power front bucket seats, low-back front bucket seats, enhanced cloth seating surfaces, unique 16-inch alloy wheels, and four-wheel disc brakes (front vented, rear solid). Options included a power moonroof, a unique integrated GPS navigational system with hybrid information system, Sirius Satellite Radio, the seven-speaker premium audio system with amplifier and rear-mounted subwoofer, leather-trimmed seating surfaces, and a "two-tone" exterior paint scheme, with silver-painted lower exterior trim and front and rear bumpers.

==== 2004–2006 (ZB) ====
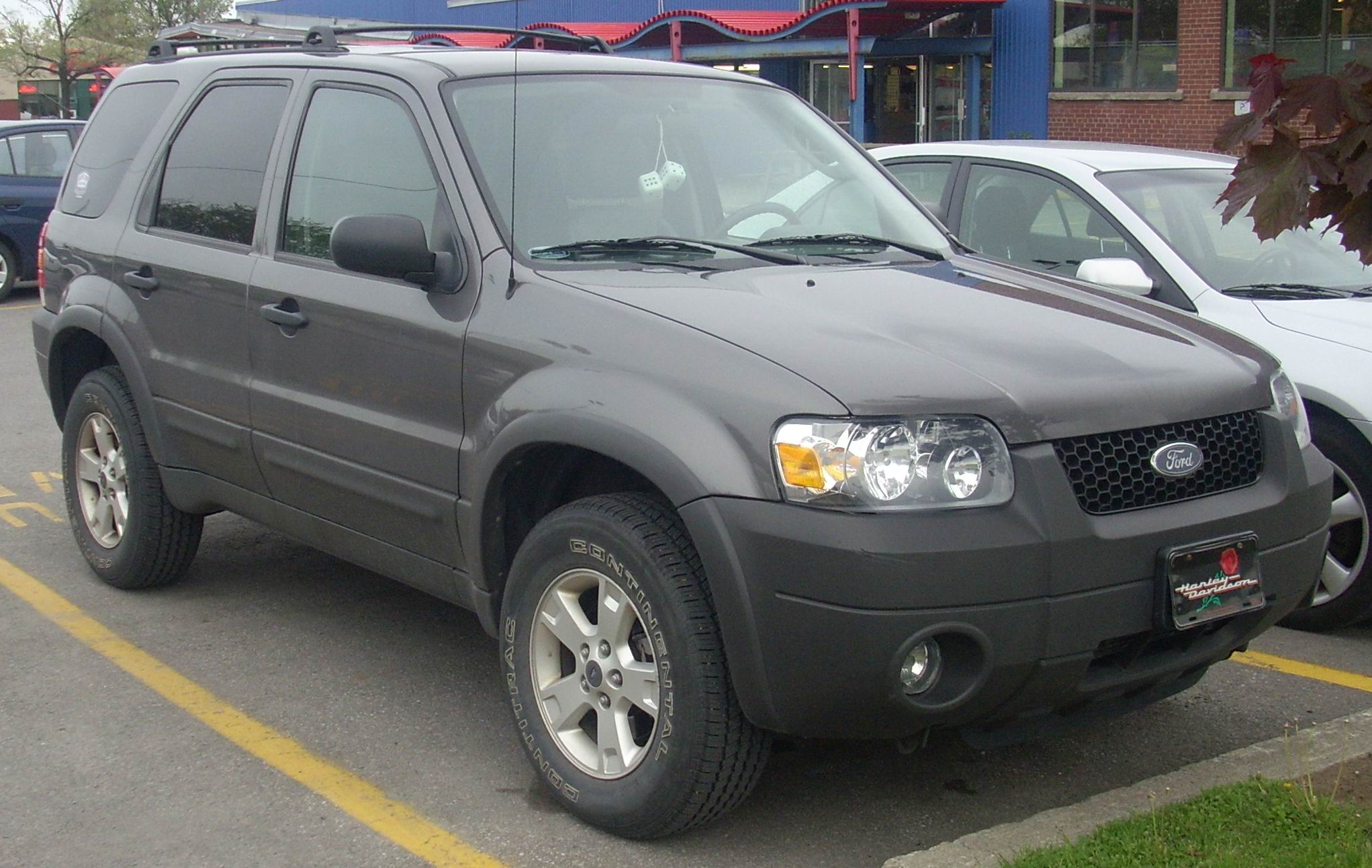
2004–2006 Ford Escape (ZB)

The Escape and Tribute were updated in February 2004 for the 2005 model year with a new base engine (the 2.3 L [2261 cc, 140 cu in] Duratec 23), which replaced the Zetec 2.0 L (1983 cc, 121 cu in) 127 hp (95 kW) four-cylinder. The most powerful engine remained the 200 hp (150 kW) Duratec 3.0 L (2976 cc, 181 cu in) V6, with new engine mounts. Ford also added advanced airbag and seatbelt safety systems, an intelligent AWD system, and exterior minor changes, which included a redesigned front bumper. The 2005 model year was the first with an automatic transmission available on the base four-cylinder models. Models equipped with the V6 engine and four-wheel drive became available with four-wheel disc brakes (front vented, rear solid). The automatic shifter was moved from the column to the console on all models equipped with automatic transmissions. Ford also deleted the rear-seat recline feature to improve the safety of rear-seat occupants in the event of a rear crash.

==== 2006–2008 (ZC; Asia-Pacific) ====
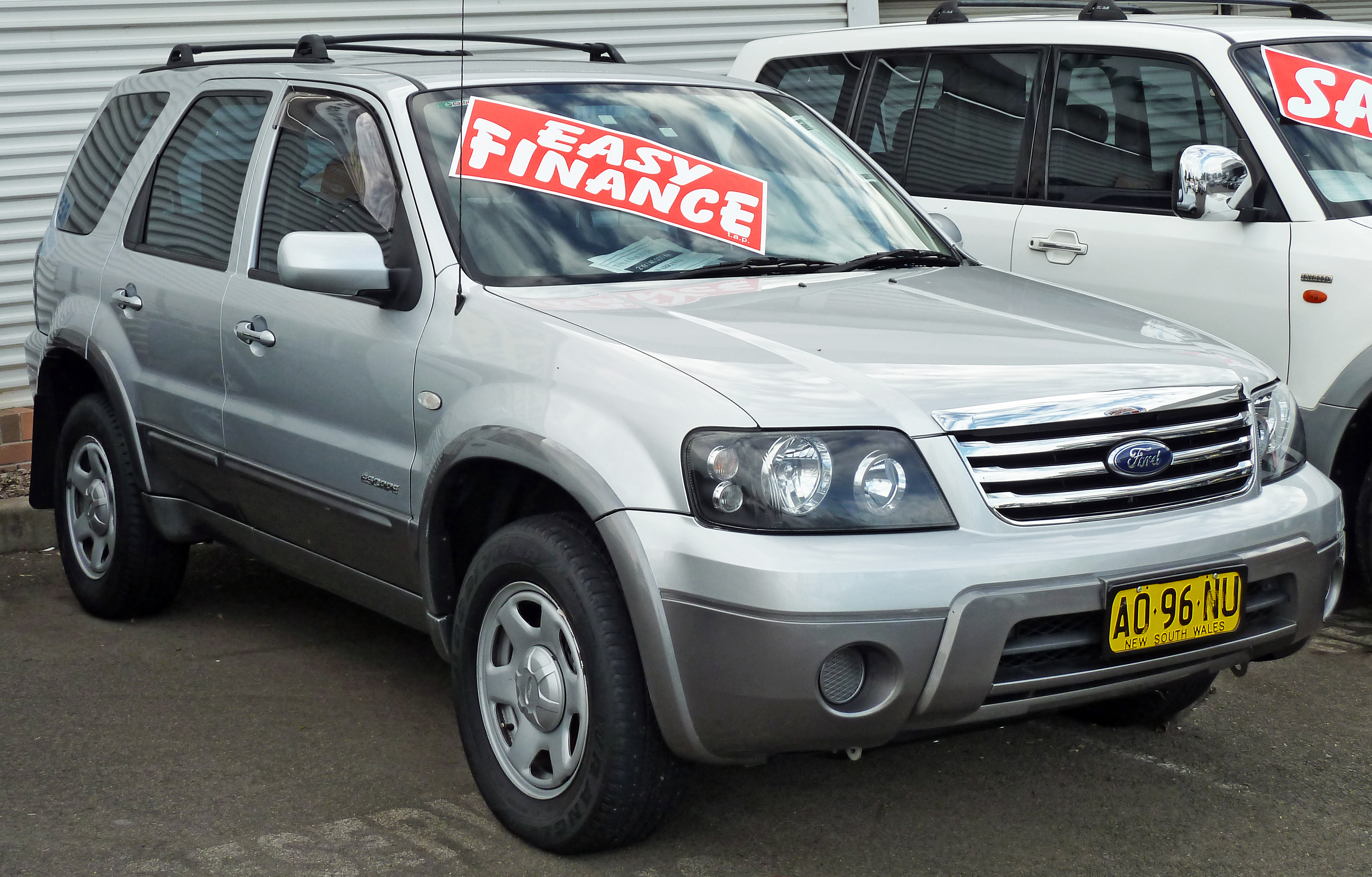
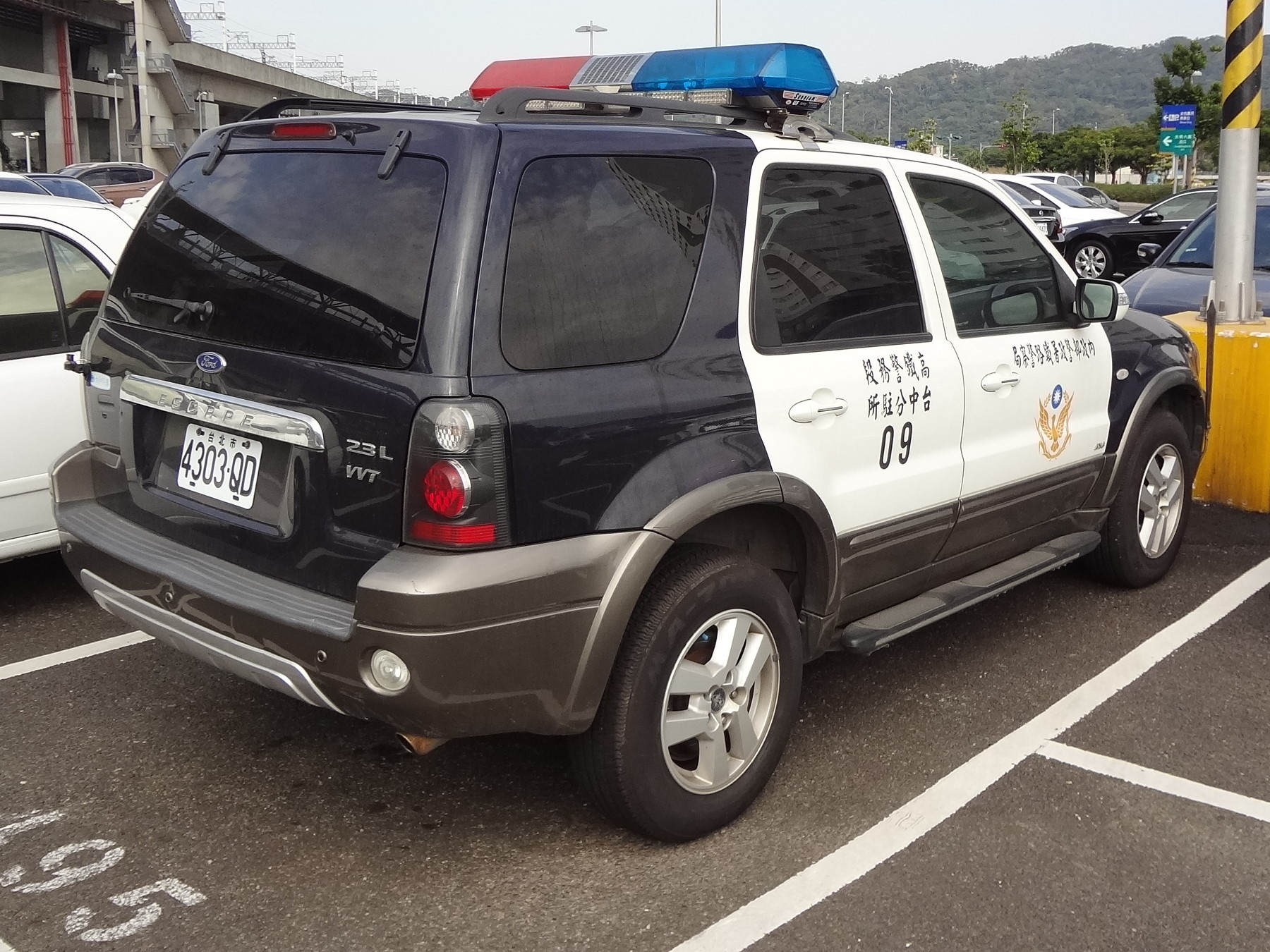
2006–2008 Ford Escape (ZC)
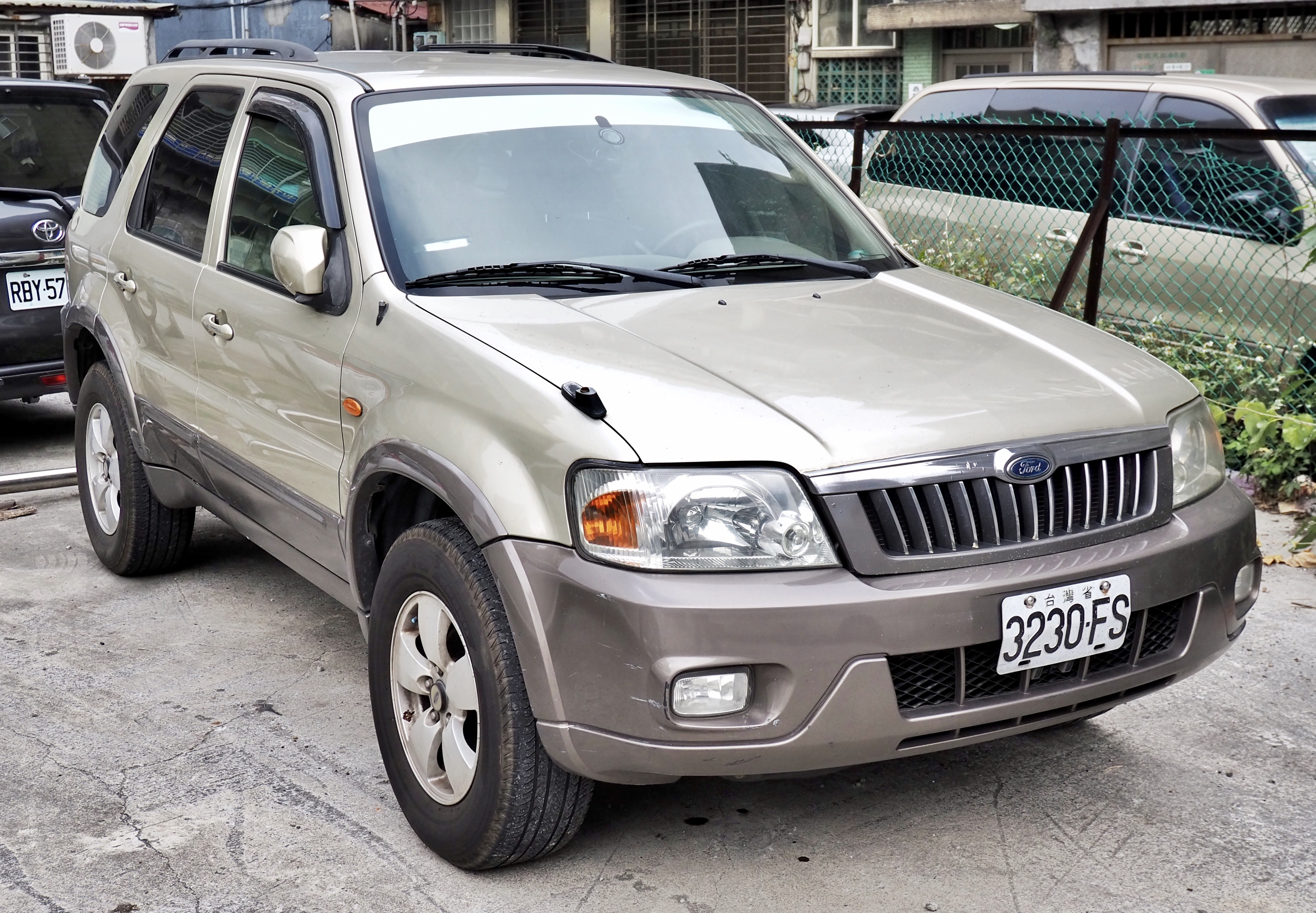
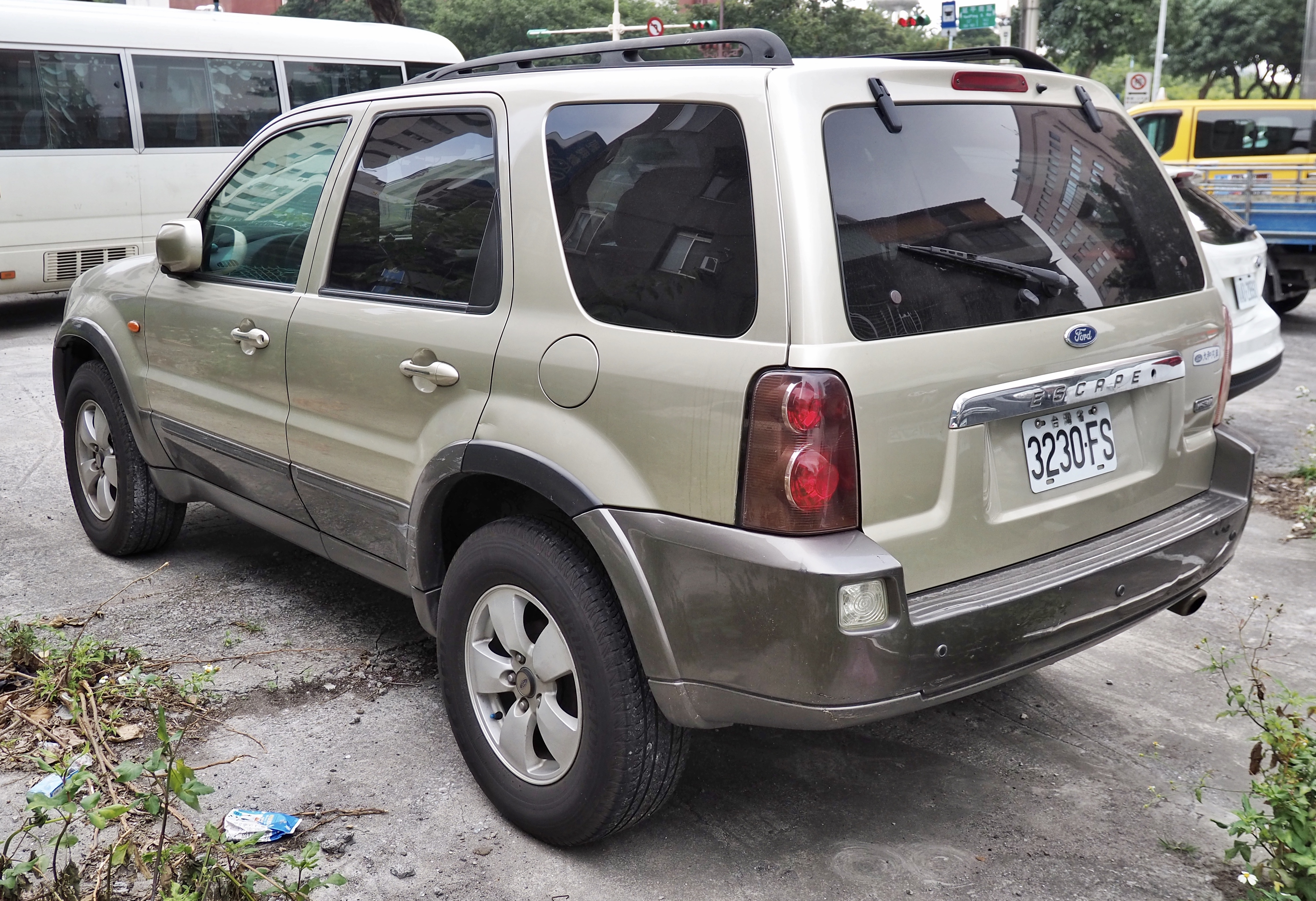
2006 Ford Escape (ZC, Taiwanese version)

Previewed by the Ford Equator Concept in 2005, a revamped ZC Escape designed in Taiwan by Ford Lio Ho went on sale in the second half of 2006 for the Asian and Pacific markets (except South Korea, where the North American-market Escape is sold). Major external changes included a redesigned front bumper, grille, headlights and hood, and rear bumper, as well as LED taillights.

On the inside, changes included a floor-mounted automatic-transmission shifter, in place of the column shifter, as well as a redesigned center stack containing audio and climate controls. Climate control is automatic on all models except the XLS. The Limited model also featured full color-coded bumpers, wheel arches and side moldings, as well as side mirrors with integrated LED indicators. Rear drum brakes have been replaced by disc brakes all round.

The 3.0 L V6 has been modified to reduce fuel consumption by over 10%, while the 2.3 L 4-cylinder has improved midrange torque and an electronic throttle, as well as a slight increase in power to 109 kW (146 hp). Both engines had been certified to meet Euro III emission regulations. A four-speed automatic carried over and was the sole transmission choice. Two different four-speed automatic transmissions were used, CD4E for 3.0 L V6 and GF4AX-EL for 2.3 L 4-cylinder.

==== 2008–2009 (ZD; Asia-Pacific) ====
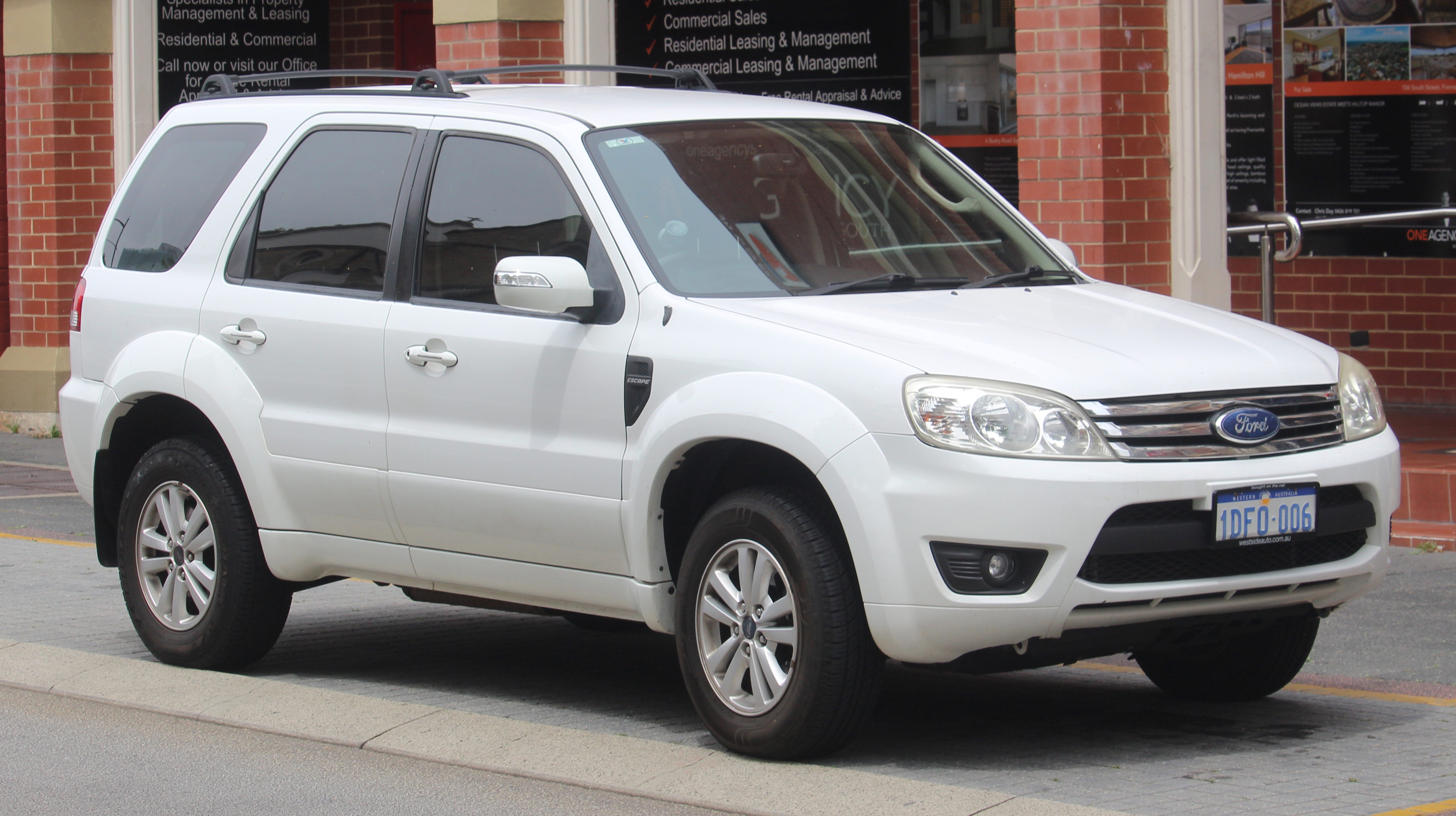
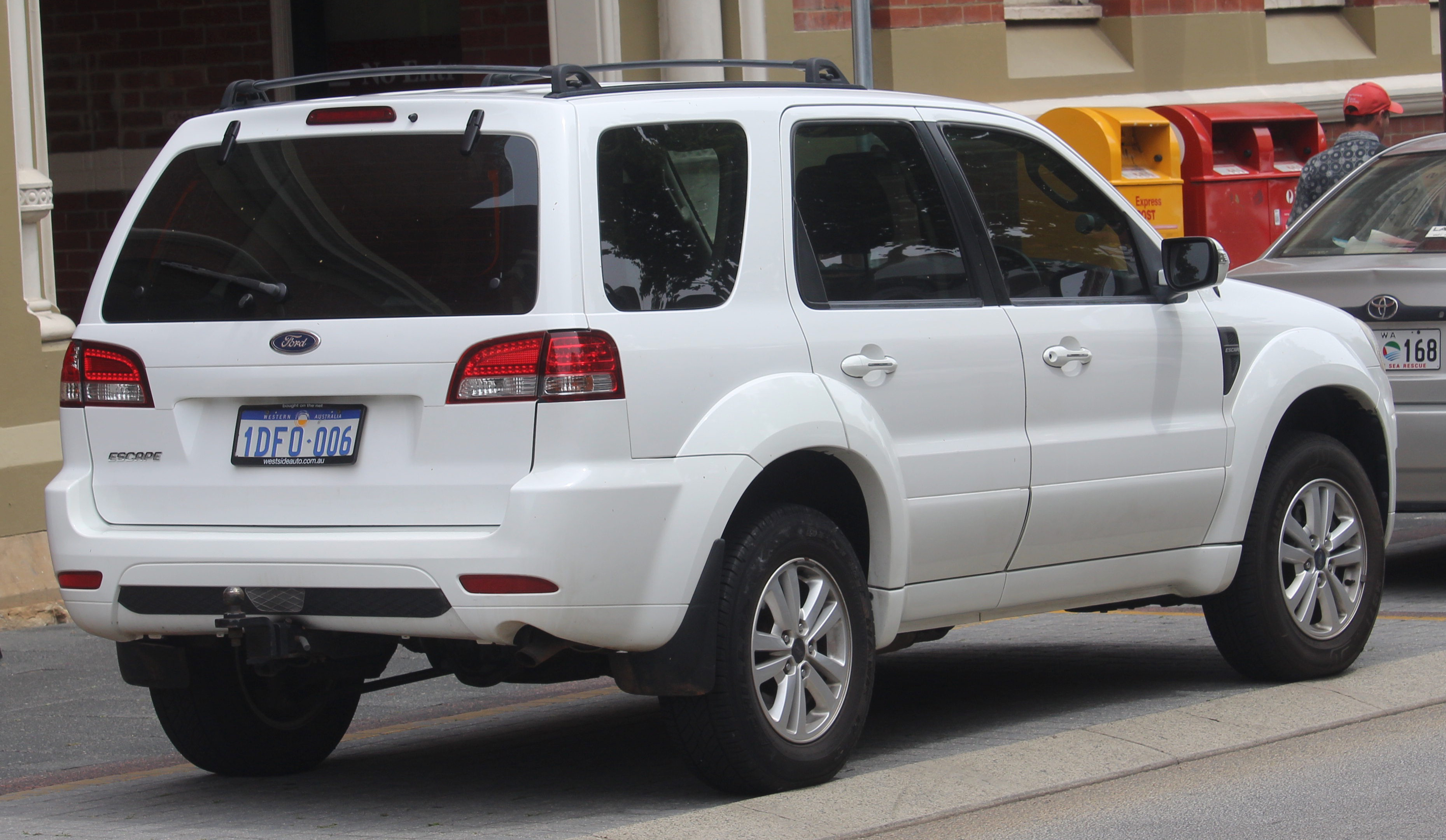
2008–2009 Ford Escape (ZD)

Previewed by the Ford Escape Adventure Concept, the ZD Escape designed in Taiwan by Ford Lio Ho for Asia-Pacific markets went on sale in mid-2008, bringing numerous changes. In Australia, the V6 engine was dropped, leaving only the 2.3-liter four-cylinder.

The model range was also simplified, with only a single specification available. Changes to the body included an all-new front bumper, grille, headlights and bonnet, featuring an enlarged Ford emblem set upon a three-bar chrome grille. At the rear, new, slimmer tail lights were featured, which were arranged horizontally, rather than vertically. In addition, the B-pillar was painted black, rather than body-colour. Compared with the previous model, all external bumpers, mirrors, and cladding were painted the same colour as the body (previously, this was only available on the upscale Limited model). Equipment levels have also improved. Compared to the base model ZC Escape, the ZD included standard side airbags, automatic climate control, 16" alloy wheels, and mirrors with integrated indicators. Unlike most other competitors in its class, curtain airbags and electronic stability control were not available.

==== 2009–2012 (ZD; Asia-Pacific) ====
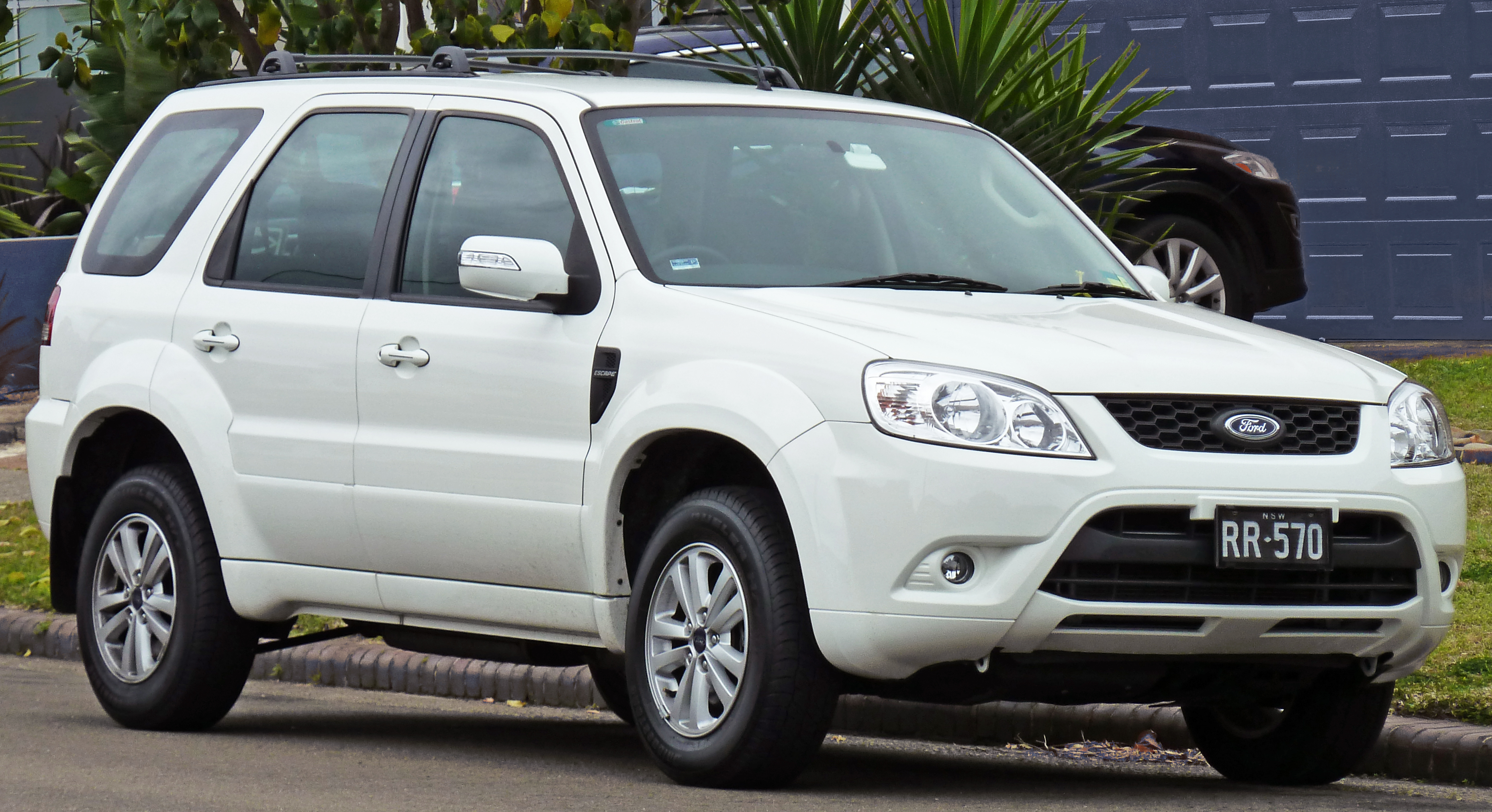
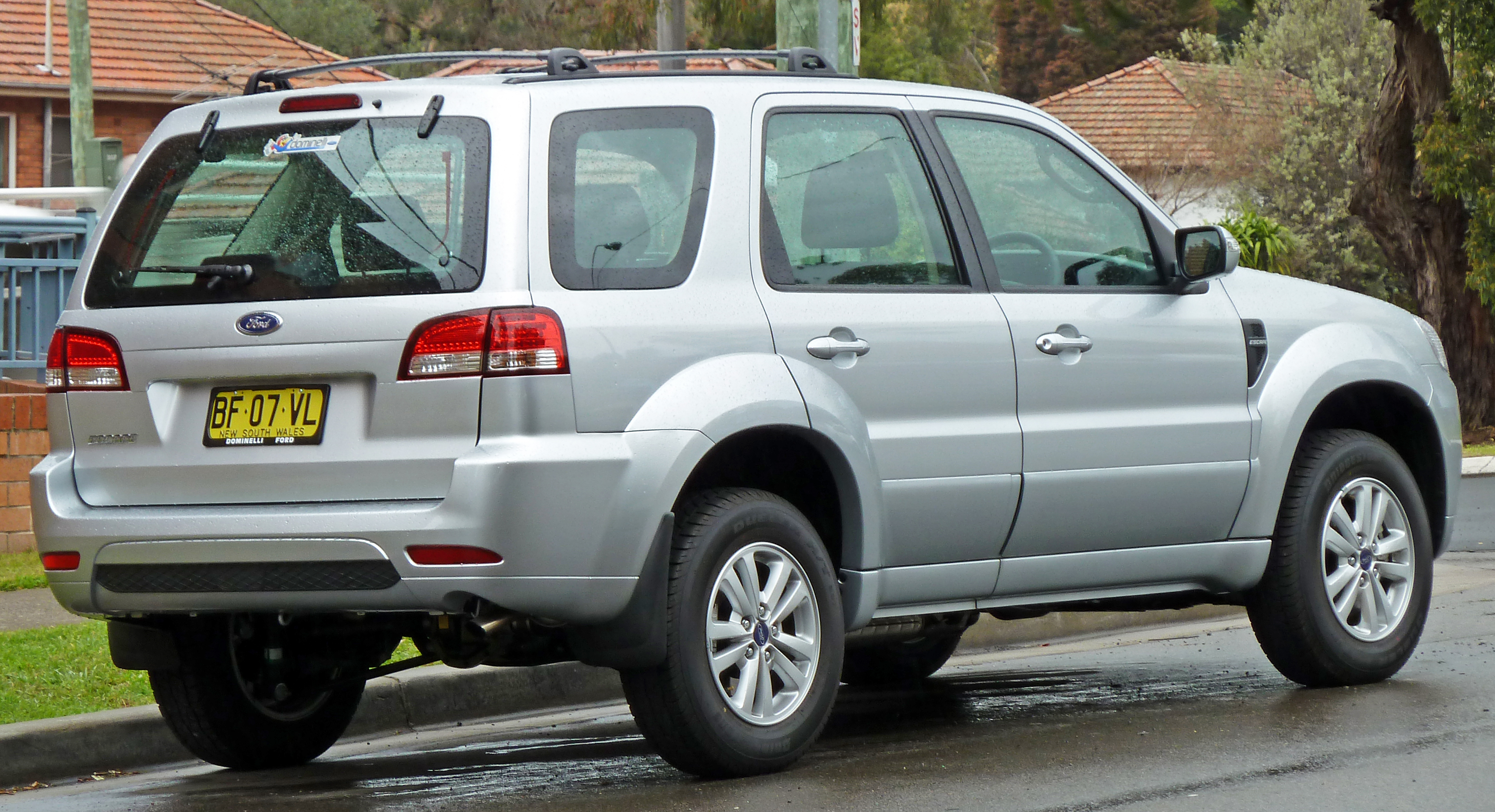
2009–2012 Ford Escape (ZD)

In 2009, a facelift of the ZD Escape developed by Ford Lio Ho brought about a new grille and front bumper. Chrome trim was completely removed from the grille, replaced with a smaller, black honeycomb grille as the last Ford Escape. In its final years, it was sold alongside its successor, Ford Kuga until the Kuga replaced it in 2013.

=== Mercury Mariner ===
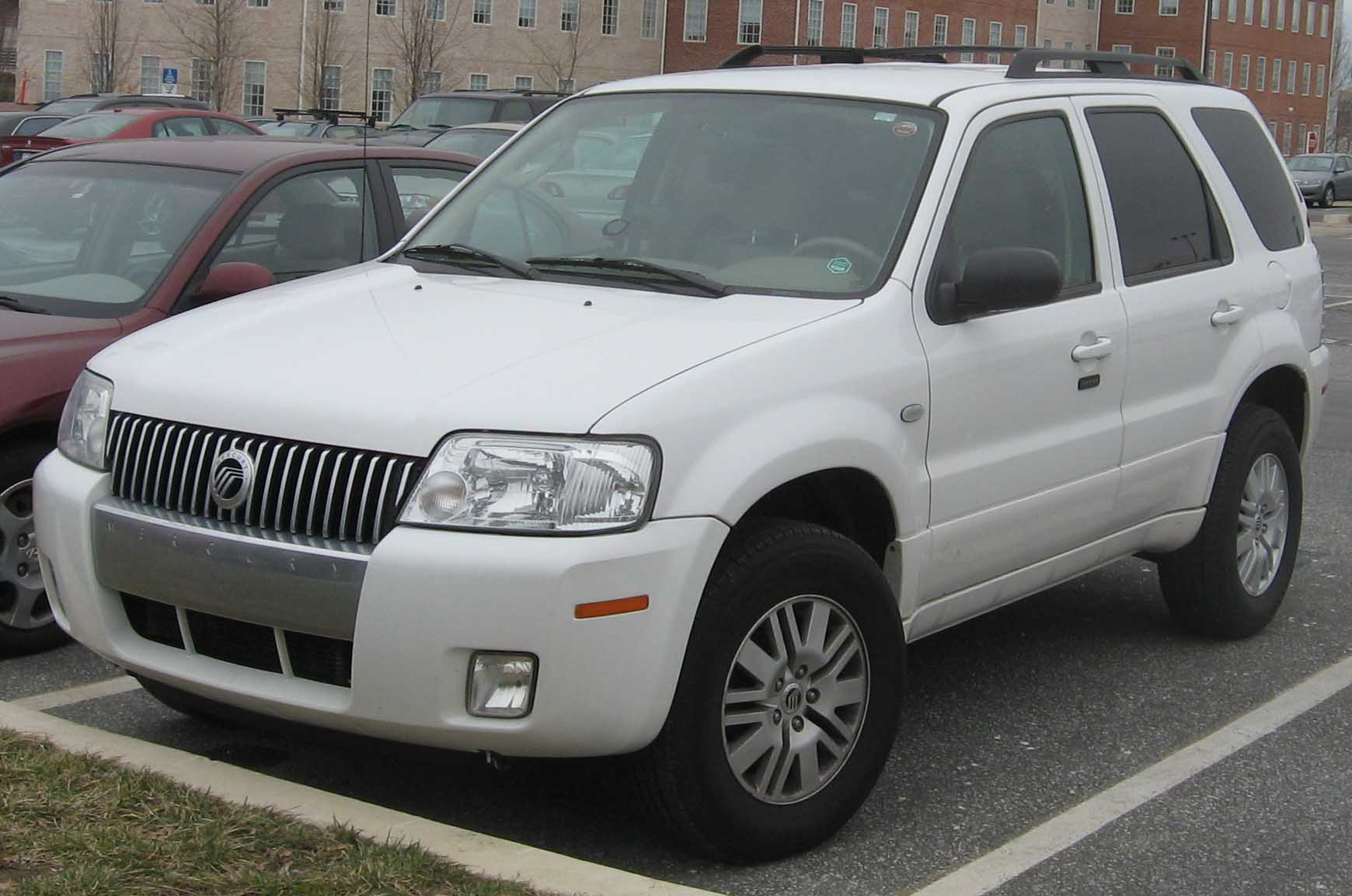
Mercury Mariner

Introduced in 2004 for the 2005-model-year refresh of the Ford Escape in the US, Ford's Mercury division marketed a rebadged variant, the Mariner, Mercury's first car-based SUV. The Mariner was marketed in the US, Mexico, Saudi Arabia, Kuwait, and the UAE. The Mariner featured minor stylistic differences, such as a two-tone interior, turn signal repeaters borrowed from the European-market Ford Maverick (the Escape's name in Europe), monotone cladding, and the Mercury "waterfall" front grille. Unlike its counterparts, Mercury did not offer a manual transmission as part of the powertrain lineup. The Mariner was the first Mercury with a four-cylinder since the Mercury Cougar was dropped in 2002. For 2006, the lineup was expanded with the introduction of the Mariner Hybrid. Sales ended after the 2007 model year, replaced by a second generation, again a rebadged Ford Escape.

On September 7, 2006, Ford delivered a special "Presidential Edition" Mercury Mariner Hybrid to former President Bill Clinton. Its custom features include: LED lighting, 120 V outlet, rear bucket seats, center console & rear seat fold-out writing desks, personal DVD players for each seat, refrigerator, increased rear seat legroom. There have also been several undisclosed security modifications made to the vehicle.

The Mariner Hybrid powertrain was identical to its sibling, the Ford Escape Hybrid. It was launched to the U.S. market in 2006 and was discontinued in 2010 (in the second generation) when the Mercury car division itself was discontinued by Ford. The Mariner hybrid sold a total of 12,300 units.

Like the Ford Escape Hybrid, the Mariner Hybrid is a "full" hybrid electric system, meaning the system can switch automatically between pure electric power, pure gasoline engine power, or a combination of both, for maximum performance and efficiency at all speeds and loads. When braking or decelerating, the Mariner's hybrid system uses regenerative braking, where the electric drive motor becomes a generator, converting the vehicle's momentum back to electricity for storage in the batteries. With 155 hp (116 kW), the Mariner Hybrid has nearly the same acceleration performance as the conventional 200 hp (150 kW) V6 Mariner. Again, just like the Escape Hybrid, it gets a respectable average of 34 miles per US gallon (6.9 L/100 km; 41 mpg_{‑imp}) and is sometimes said to be the most fuel efficient sport utility vehicle on the road.

=== Hybrid ===
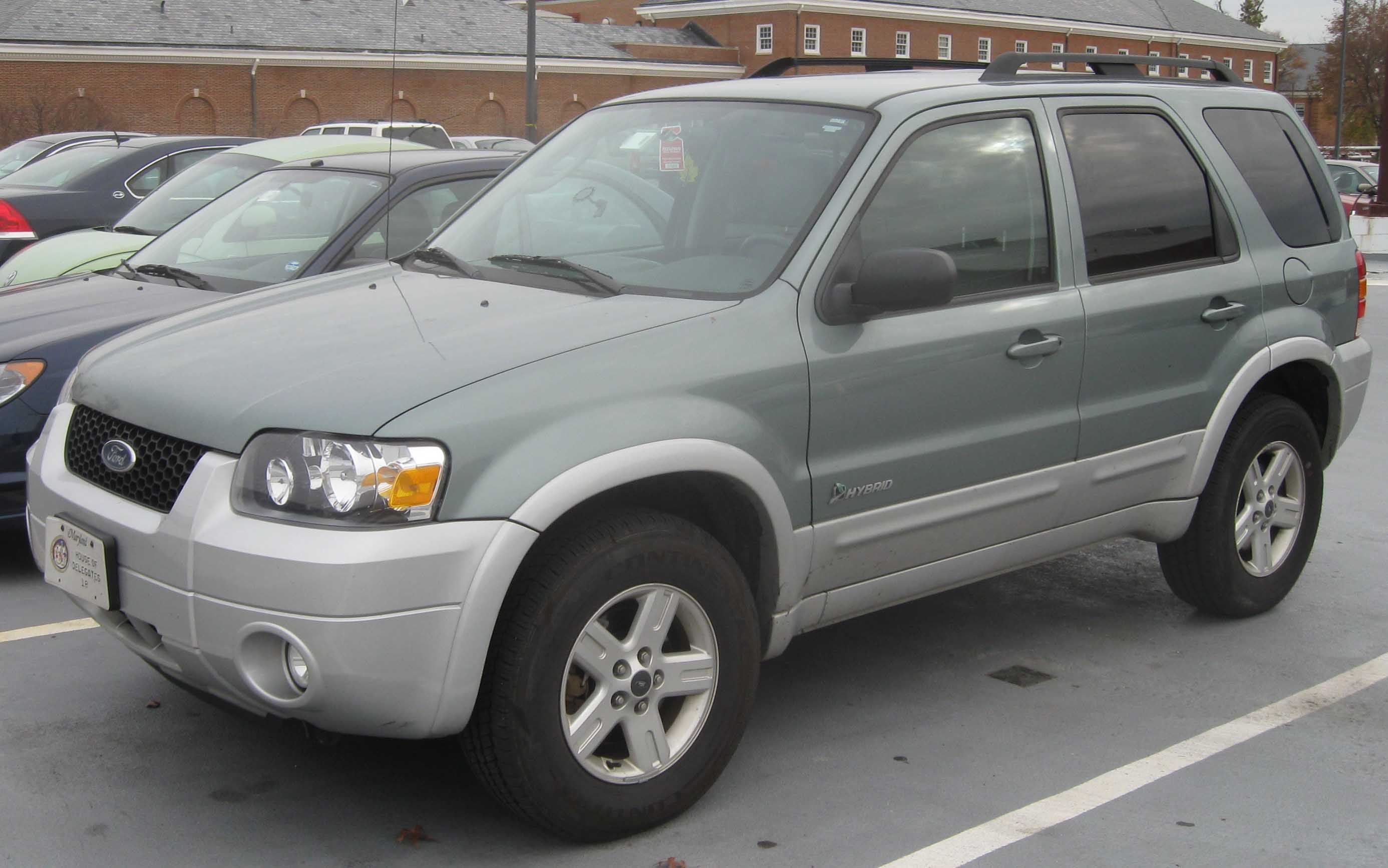
2005–2007 Ford Escape Hybrid

The Escape and Mariner Hybrids were the gasoline–electric hybrid powered versions that launched in the U.S. in 2004 for the 2005 model year — assembled in Kansas City, Missouri as the first hybrid SUV produced for sale and the first hybrid from an American manufacturer (alongside the Chevrolet Silverado/GMC Sierra Hybrids during the same model year). According to the Environmental Protection Agency, the first-generation Ford Escape Hybrid is 70% more efficient than the regular Escape. A hybrid model was offered for the co-developed Mercury Mariner but not the Mazda Tribute.

Escape hybrid models can be identified by "Hybrid" badges on the front doors and tailgate as well as the smaller driver's side cargo area window accommodating a ventilation slot for the high-voltage battery. A Special Appearance Package, available as an option on the 2005–2007 Hybrid models, included silver fascias, lower cladding, wheelip moldings, body color door handles and liftgate trim. Standard equipment on the Hybrid includes: an eight-way power adjustable driver's seat, dual-zone automatic air conditioning, cruise control, a six-CD stereo, 16-inch alloy wheels, power door locks with remote keyless entry, power windows, four-wheel disc brakes, and electric power steering.

Ford built 17,000 Escape Hybrids in the second half of 2004, four times as many as it had originally planned. Starting in 2005, New York City and other cities worldwide began using the Ford Escape Hybrid as taxicabs. Introduced to service in 2005 by San Francisco Yellow Cab and Luxor Cab, logging more than 80 million miles, many achieving a service life of more than 300,000 miles. 1,438 were placed in cab service in San Francisco and 13,237 were introduced to New York service.

==== Drivetrain technology ====
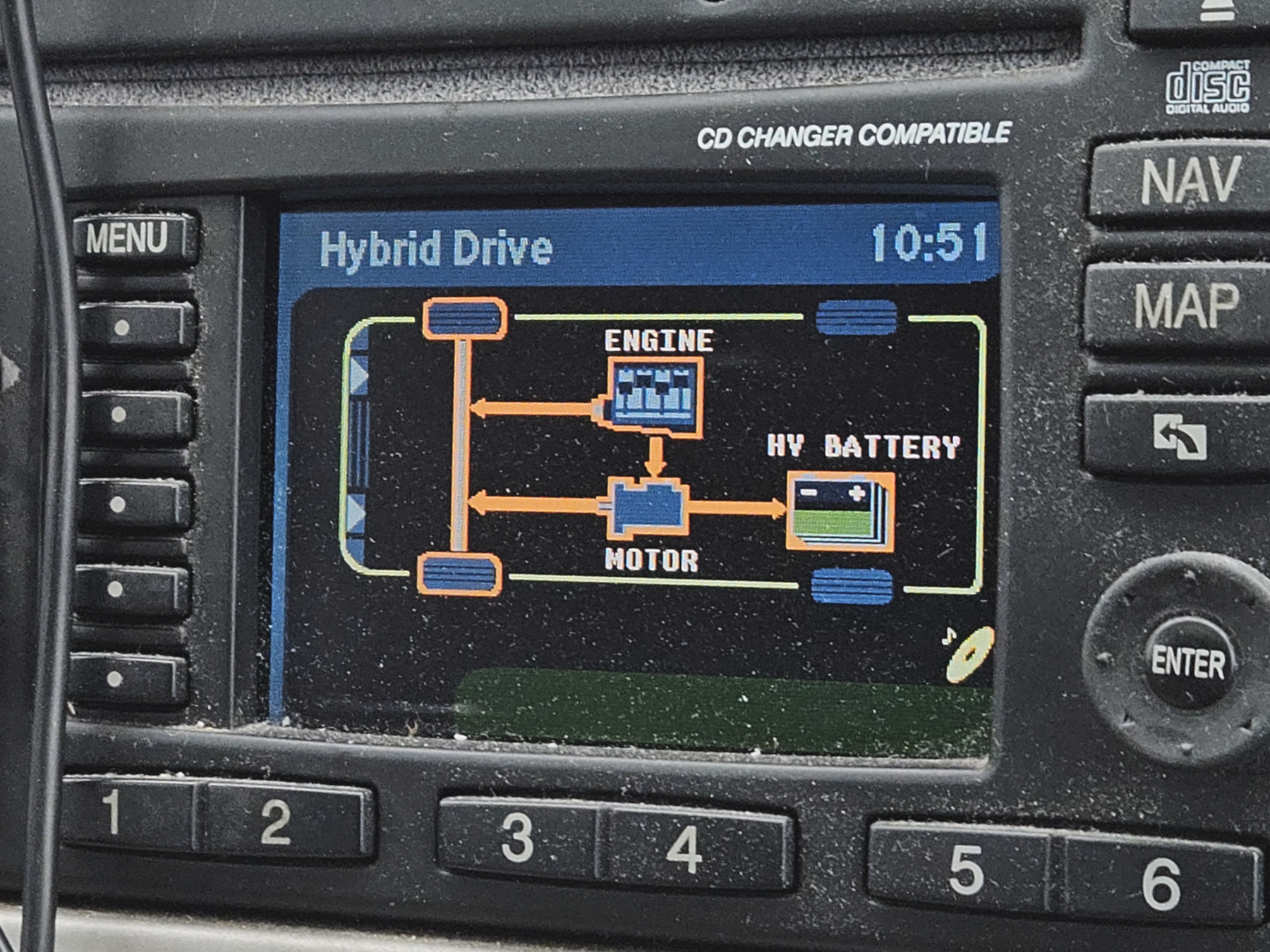
Vehicle Navigation Radio displaying energy flow diagram

The Escape Hybrid technology developed by Ford, realizing during development that the system potentially infringed on Toyotas' hybrid technologies — which led to a 2004 patent-sharing accord between the companies, licensing Ford's use of some of Toyota's hybrid technology in exchange for Toyota's use of specific Ford diesel and direct-injection engine technology. Ford said it received no technical assistance from Toyota in developing the hybrid powertrain, but that some hybrid engine technologies developed by Ford independently were found to be similar to technologies previously patented by Toyota, so licenses were obtained. Aisin Seiki Co. Ltd., a Japanese automotive components supplier belonging to the Toyota Group, supplies the HD-10 hybrid continuously variable transmission for the Escape Hybrid. While Toyota produces its third-generation Prius transmission in-house, Aisin is the only supplier of hybrid transmissions to other manufacturers. Friction has arisen concerning Aisin's allocation of limited production capacity and engineering resources to Ford. Sanyo Electric Co. built the 50 kg (110 lb), 330 volt 5.5 Ah (would make it 1.8kWh storage), 250-cell nickel metal hydride (NiMH) battery pack for the 2005 Escape Hybrid.

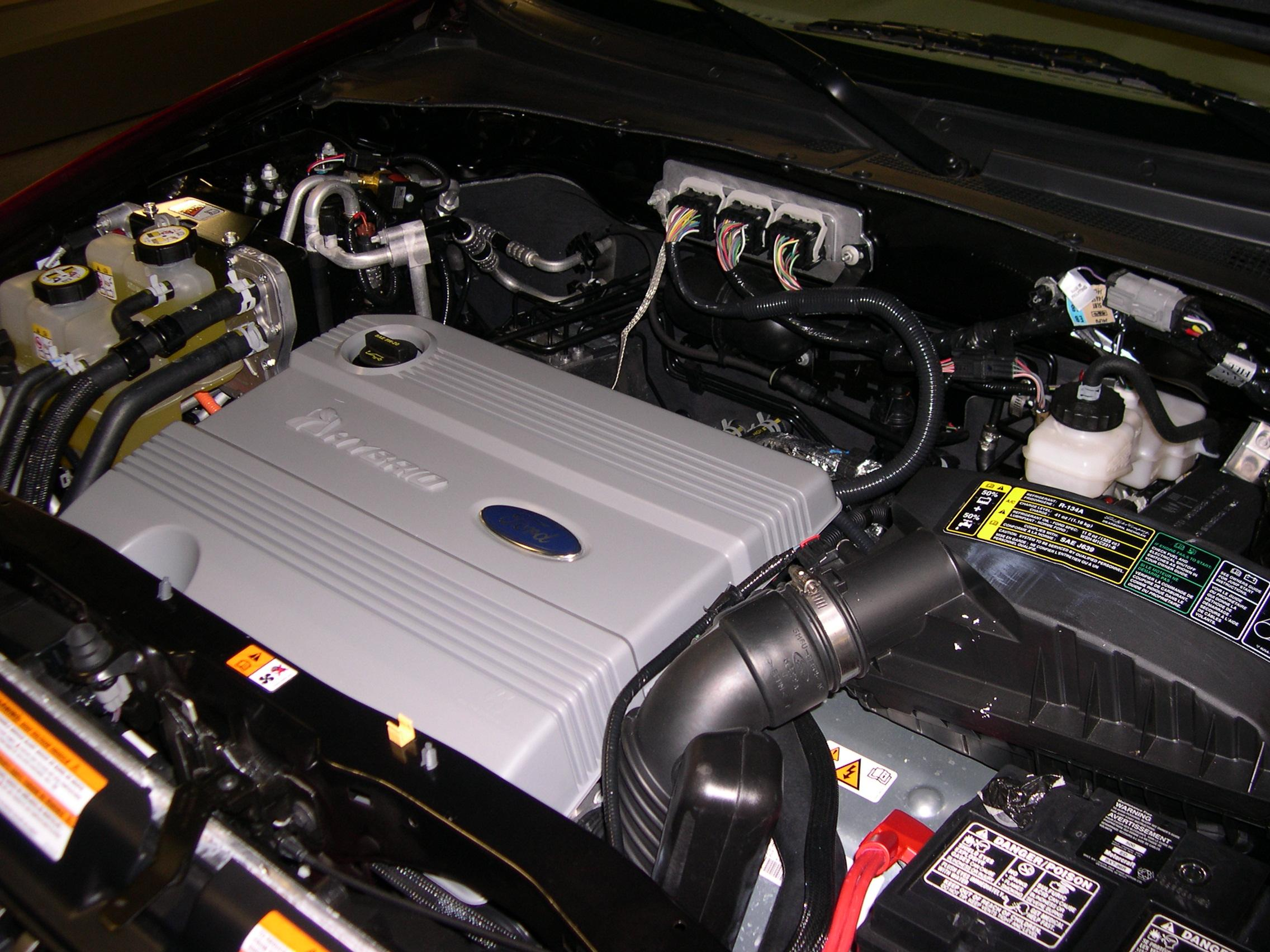
Engine compartment

The Escape Hybrid is a full hybrid, meaning the system can switch automatically between pure electric power, pure gasoline engine power, or a combination of electric battery and gasoline engine operating together, for maximum performance and efficiency at all speeds and loads. When braking or decelerating, the Escape's hybrid system uses regenerative braking, where the electric drive motor becomes a generator, converting the vehicle's momentum back to electricity for storage in the batteries. The Escape Hybrid's 133 horsepower (99 kW) Atkinson cycle gasoline I4 engine and electric motor combine to give 155 hp (116 kW), which gives the Hybrid Escape nearly the same acceleration performance as the conventional 200 hp (150 kW) V6 Escape due to the electric motor's torque being available from zero rpm.

The hybrid is said to give approximately 75% greater efficiency, the FWD version has EPA ratings of 30 mpg and 28 highway, with combined 29 mpg. The AWD version EPA ratings 28 city and 26 highway, combined 27 mpg _{-U.S.} in city traffic, and has demonstrated it can travel 400–500 miles (644–805 km) on a single 15.0-U.S.-gallon (57 L; 12.5 imp gal) mpg_{-U.S.} (7.6L-8.1 L/100 km; 35–37 mpg_{-imp}) on the highway. To obtain these mileage figures, the owners manual states that pure gasoline, not ethanol blends, must be used. In 2006, Ford showed an Escape that could run on E85 fuel.

Unlike conventional vehicles, hybrids often achieve better figures in the city because they do not waste power idling and can recover some power when stopping (by using regenerative braking) that would be wasted in a conventional vehicle.

Ford continued to develop and improve the hybrid system from the Escape with its second hybrid iteration in the 2010 Ford Fusion, Mercury Milan and Lincoln MKZ, which were in turn followed with a third iteration for the 2013 Ford Fusion and Lincoln MKZ — the latter notably using a Lithium Ion Battery Pack. subsequent iterations would follow for the 2020 Ford Escape and the 2022 Ford Maverick.

=== Recalls ===
==== Subframe failure ====
In April 2014, Ford issued a recall on 386,000 Ford Escapes and Mazda Tributes for model years 2001–2004 for Escapes manufactured October 22, 1999, through January 23, 2004, for Canada and the northern "salt belt" states in the US. Subframe rust can result in the lower control arm mount breaking or detaching from the subframe, resulting in a loss of steering control and the risk of crash. Dealers have installed a crossbrace reinforcement to any vehicle affected by the recall. Model years 2005–2007 were not affected.

== Second generation (2008) ==
Second generation
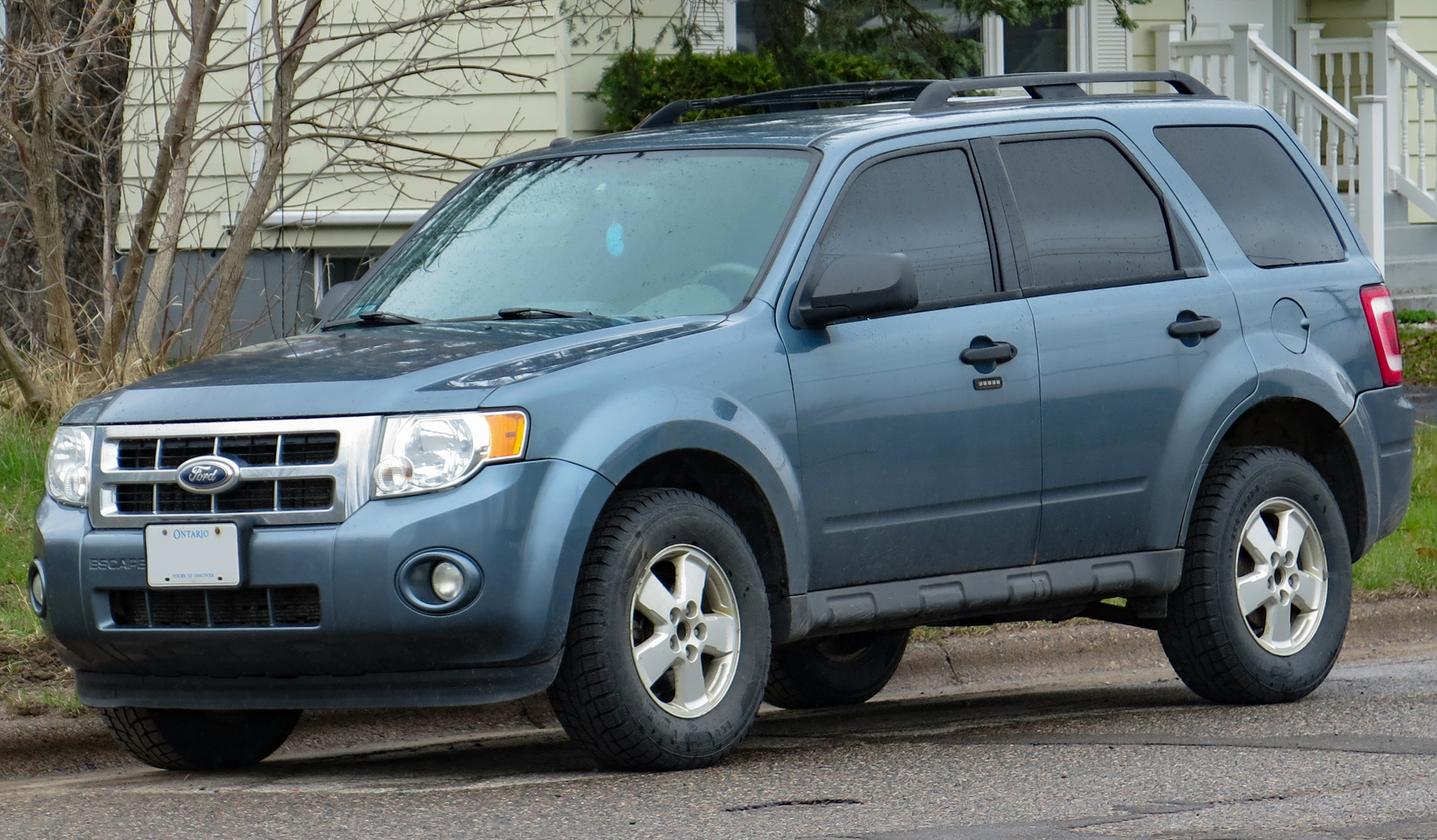

Overview
- Also called: Mazda Tribute (2007–2011); Mercury Mariner (2007–2011)
- Production: January 2007 – April 2012
- Model years: 2008–2012
- Assembly: United States: Claycomo, Missouri (KCAP)
- Designer: Doyle Letson (2004)

Body and chassis
- Platform: Ford CD2 platform

Powertrain
- Engine: Gasoline: 2.3 L Duratec 23 I4; 2.5 L Duratec 25 I4; 3.0 L Duratec 30 V6; Gasoline Hybrid/Plug-in hybrid: 2.5 L Atkinson cycle I4
- Transmission: 5-speed manual; 4-speed CD4E automatic; 6-speed 6F35 automatic; Hybrid: Planetary gear

Dimensions
- Wheelbase: 103.1 in (2,619 mm)
- Length: 174.7 in (4,437 mm)
- Width: 71.1 in (1,806 mm)
- Height: 2008: 67.7 in (1,720 mm); 2009–12 AWD: 67.8 in (1,722 mm); 2009–12 FWD: 67.9 in (1,725 mm)

Chronology
- Successor: Mazda CX-5 (for Tribute)

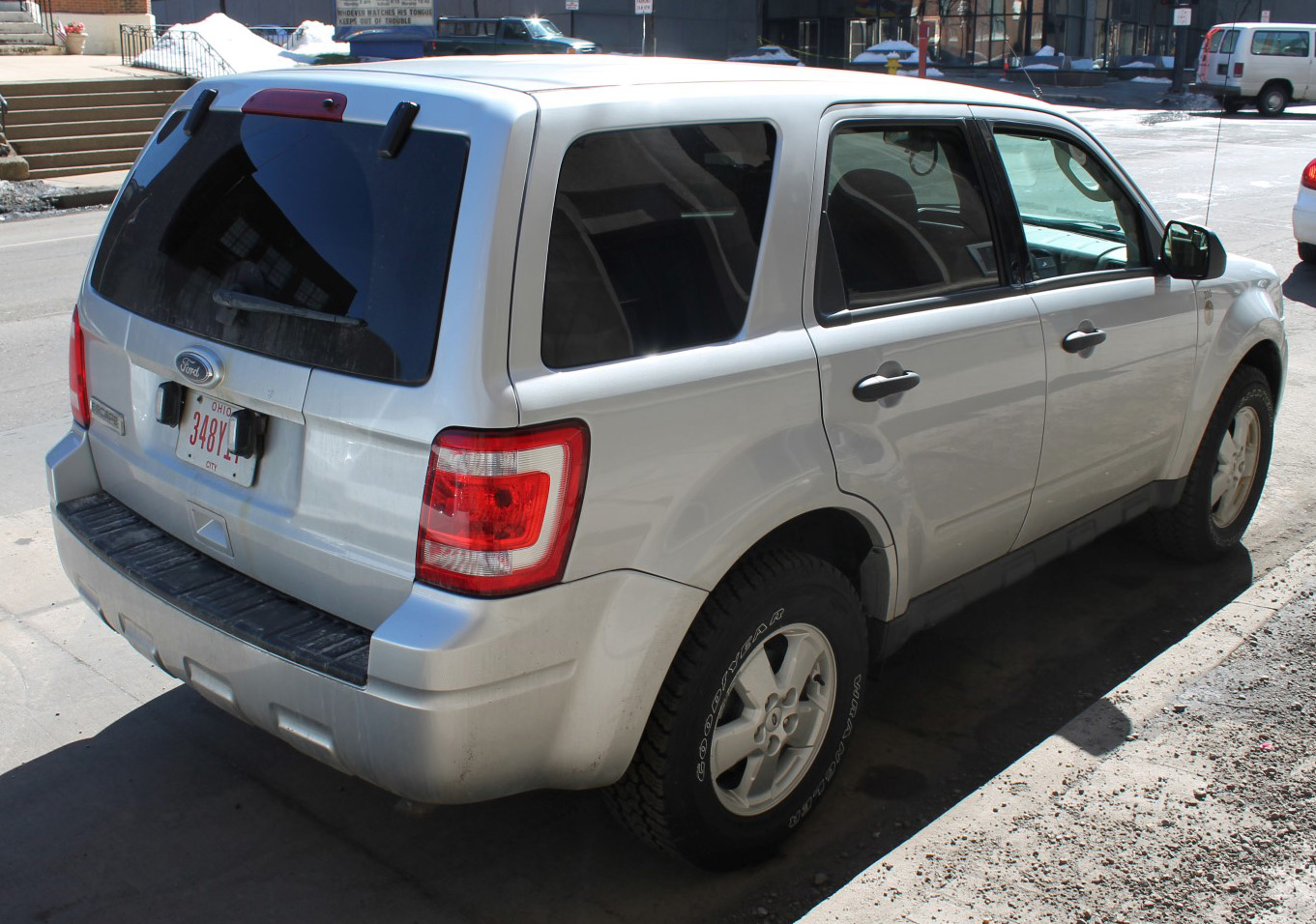
Ford Escape

The second-generation Ford Escape debuted at the 2006 Los Angeles International Auto Show. The North American market Escape and its Mazda Tribute and Mercury Mariner siblings were redesigned to stay competitive with other new compact SUVs; however, most of the internals have been carried over for the 2008 model year. The Escape still uses the CD2 platform. Ford also included an electronic stability control system on the 2008 Escape. The Mercury version lasted until late 2010, withdrawn from the market as part of the closure of the Mercury brand, with Mazda's Tribute ending production in late 2011. Ford ended manufacture of the second-generation Escape in 2012.

The updated Escape received some styling cues from the Explorer, Edge, and Expedition. Changes included a new grille with larger headlamps in the front fascia, while the sides were revised with cleaner lines and rounder wheel arches. The interior was also completely redesigned, including the newest standard Ford family navigation system.

The 2008 Escape and its Mercury Mariner sibling were the first vehicles to feature Ford's pull-drift steering mode, an enhancement made possible by applying software control to the Electric Power Steering (EPS) system. This system came standard on all second-generation CD2 models. All second-generation CD2 models came with front disc/rear drum brakes, except for 2008 Hybrid models which carried over the four-wheel disc brake setup from the previous generation.

The 2008 models of all three CD-2 versions retained the previous generation's engines and transmissions. However, the manual transmission was only available with the four-cylinder and front-wheel drive, and with the XLS trim. For 2009, all three versions received engine and transmission upgrades that increased performance and fuel economy.

Ford ended production on the second-generation Escape in 2012 and moved production to its Louisville Assembly Plant in Louisville, Kentucky, where it was succeeded by a new Escape based on its European CUV counterpart, the Ford Kuga.

=== Ford ===
A new concept version for the Asian market, called the Ford Escape Adventure Concept, was revealed at the 2007 Tokyo Motor Show. It features a revised front and rear fascia, incorporating Ford's three-bar grille styling theme and restyled LED tail lamps.

For the 2009 model year, the 2.3 L Duratec 23 was replaced by a new 2.5 L (2488 cc, 152 cu in) Duratec 25 4-cylinder, which boosted standard power to 171 hp (128 kW) and 171 lb⋅ft (232 N⋅m) of torque, while increasing fuel economy by 1 mpg (~2L/100 km) on both urban and extra-urban cycles. This engine was the base engine on all trims. The 3.0 L Duratec 30 V6, optional on XLT and became standard on Limited, was thoroughly updated, resulting in a 40 hp (30 kW) increase, bringing power output to 240 hp (180 kW) and 223 lb⋅ft (302 N⋅m) of torque. The Duratec 30 also saw a 1 mpg_{‑US} (240 L/100 km; 1.2 mpg_{‑imp}) fuel economy improvement. Another significant change was the switch to Ford's new 6F35 6-speed automatic, which became standard on all models except the XLS FWD, where it was optional.

The Hybrid is also upgraded to use the 2.5 L (albeit still using the Atkinson cycle for better fuel economy). Efficiency improved to 34 mpg_{‑US} (6.9 L/100 km; 41 mpg_{‑imp}) city and 31 mpg_{‑US} (7.6 L/100 km; 37 mpg_{‑imp}) highway according to the US EPA. The 2.5 L engine brings the Hybrid's power output up by 22 hp (16 kW) to 156 hp (116 kW) combined when the electric motor is added in. In addition, the 2010 hybrid model changed the air conditioning compressor from an engine-driven belt to being electrically powered by the HV traction battery. This allowed the air-conditioning system to continue cooling while the gas engine was off; for example, while at stop lights.

Other mechanical changes include a new 18.5 mm (0.73 in) rear stabilizer bar, revised suspension tuning, upgrades to the 3.0 L V6 that brought power to 240 hp, and a new exhaust system on all Escapes. The braking system for the Hybrid versions has been revised with a vacuum assist unit that reviewers have said give the brakes a consistent feel over the entire travel of the brake pedal. The brakes on this model, when tested, gave the Escape extremely long stops. However, the brakes on earlier models were reported to have a slightly mushy feel because regenerative braking took over before the friction brakes engaged.

For 2009, Ford's SYNC system was standard on the Hybrid, Hybrid Limited, and conventional Limited models, and optional on the XLS and XLT.

The Escape underwent some minor aerodynamic changes for 2009, including a revised front chin spoiler and rear tire spoilers. Along with the addition of rear tire spoilers is an optional 17" chrome-clad wheel equipped with a new Michelin "Low-Rolling-Resistance-Tire", slightly increasing ground clearance and improving traction over the standard 16" wheels and tires. Another new feature is Ford's Easy-Fuel capless fuel filling system. 2009 also saw the introduction of the optional "sport appearance package", which changed the front grille from chrome to gloss black, added a gloss black appliqué to the front bumper, changed the rocker covers and door handles from unpainted black plastic to body-coloured, added a gloss black rear spoiler, black headlamp housings, black 17" rims, and black cloth/leather interior with piano black trim. This option was only available on the XLT trim level and only with ingot silver, sterling gray, steel blue, or tuxedo black metallic paints. The "Escape" badge was entirely removed from the front doors, and V6 badges were also removed from the front fenders on V6 models.

As of August 2009, the Escape was among the four Ford vehicles, along with the Focus, F-Series and Ranger, to benefit the most from the Cash for Clunkers program, where it showed a 49 percent increase in sales.

In mid-2009, for the 2010 model year, the Escape added a standard integrated spotter mirror for better blind-spot viewing. Everything else added in the 2008 and 2009 model years was carried over, but the optional orders have been renamed to Rapid Specification Codes (100S for XLS, 200S for XLT, and 300S for Limited). Other new features and changes for 2010 included Active Park Assist (optional on Limited models). Active Park Assist uses sensors on the front and rear of the vehicle to detect an available parallel-parking space and automatically steers the vehicle into the space while the driver controls the accelerator and brakes. A liftgate-mounted backup camera also became optional on Limited. The camera sends images to a video display in the rearview mirror or the navigation system screen to help enhance visibility directly behind the vehicle when it is in reverse. The liftgate release handle was relocated to the bottom of the liftgate. V6 models became standard with flex-fuel capability, and 4WD models no longer had the 4WD badge on the liftgate.

No cosmetic changes were made for the 2011 model year, except that later models featured a redesigned liftgate glass handle. The only minor change is the standardization of SYNC Traffic & Directions on models equipped with Ford Sync.

There are no cosmetic or equipment changes for the 2012 model year. The third-generation Escape was unveiled at the 2012 North American International Auto Show in Detroit.

Previously unavailable Electronic Stability Control system became standard on the second generation. In Insurance Institute for Highway Safety crash tests, the Escape along with its cousins, the Mercury Mariner and the Mazda Tribute, are rated "Good" in both frontal and side impact crash tests. They are rated "Good" for rear crash protection as well and were given the "Top Safety Pick" award until 2010. In roof strength tests, the Escape receives a "Marginal" rating while hybrid models are rated "Poor".

=== Mazda ===
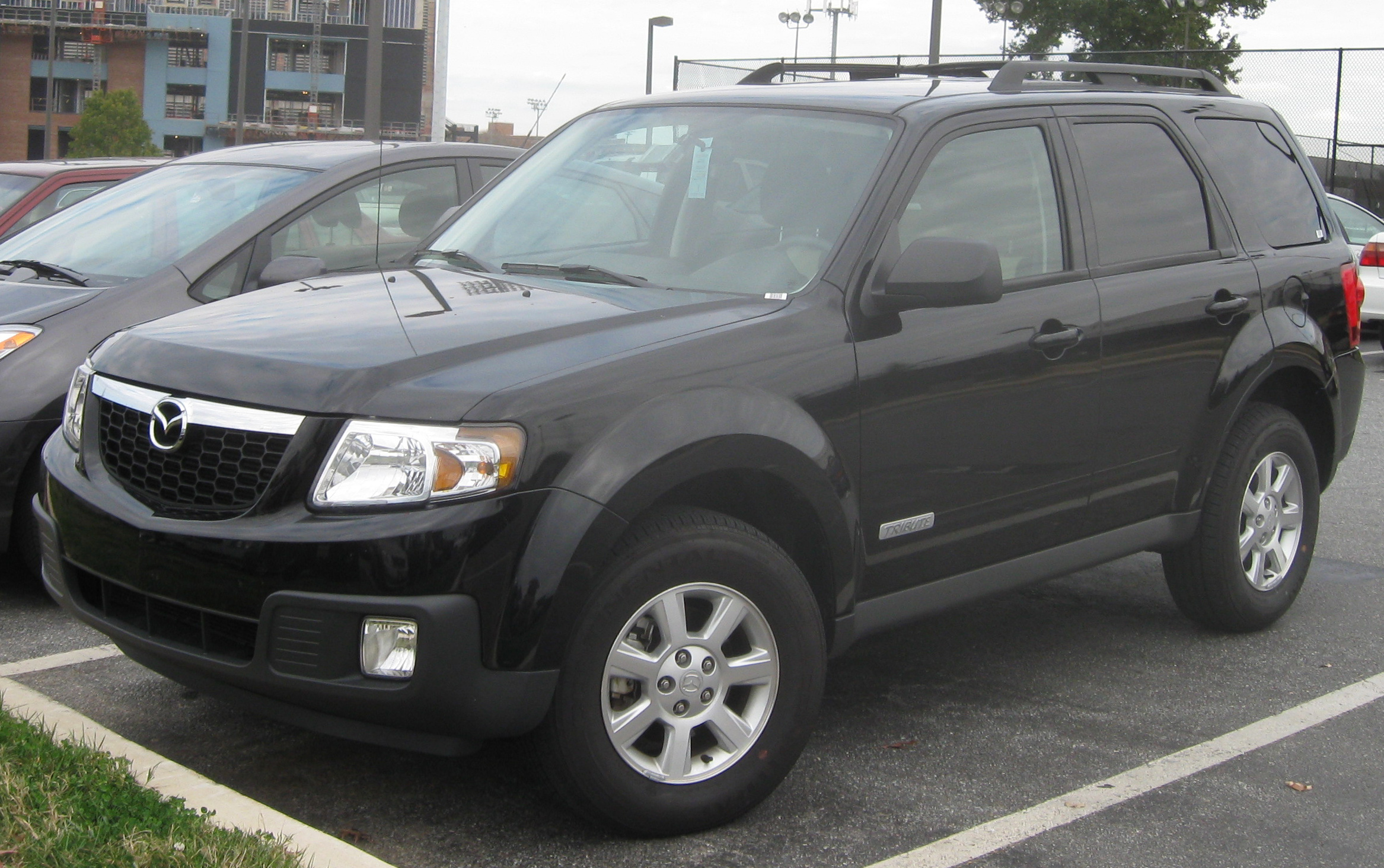
Mazda Tribute

In 2007 for the 2008 model year, the Tribute was significantly revamped, like its Ford Escape and Mercury Mariner siblings. Originally set to be renamed the Mazda CX-5, the vehicle kept the Tribute name. The changes were significant, but fell short of a "clean sheet" redesign, as the vehicles remained on the CD2 platform, and kept the old 2.3 L MZR I4, and 3.0 L AJ V6 engines. Visible changes include all new sheet metal and interior. The interior was significantly upgraded using all new components and higher quality materials, and was generally praised by automotive journalists. However, unlike the first generation of the Tribute, which had unique exterior and interior from its siblings, the new model only differs from its siblings in the "nose" (front fenders, hood, and front fascia), tail lights and detailing. Notable changes to the exterior include higher belt line, and more pronounced wheel arches. Overall the car was to look larger and more substantial than the previous model. As a cost-saving measure, the rear brake was reverted to drum brake, with predictable criticisms.

The 2008 Mazda Tribute (non-hybrid) was first unveiled at the 2007 Montreal International Auto Show, and the 2008 Mazda Tribute went on sale in March 2007. A new addition was the Hybrid model, which was previously only available on the Ford Escape and Mercury Mariner.

The Tribute received additional major changes to improve performance for the 2009 model year, mostly by way of mechanical upgrades. Most significantly, all new engines replaced the increasingly outmatched 2.3L I4 and 3.0L V6. Mazda's new MZR 2.5L I4 replaced the 2.3L, boosting horsepower to 171 bhp (128 kW; 173 PS) and 171 lb⋅ft (232 N⋅m) of torque at 4000 rpm. Despite increased horsepower, fuel economy also increased by 1 mpg_{‑US} (240 L/100 km; 1.2 mpg_{‑imp}) on both urban and extra-urban cycles. The optional 3.0 L (AJ) V6 was thoroughly updated, resulting in a 40 hp (30 kW) increase, bringing power output to 240 hp (180 kW) and 223 lb⋅ft (302 N⋅m) of torque. It also saw a 1 mpg improvement. The Tribute Hybrid was dropped after the 2009 model year.

Another significant change was the switch to Ford's new 6F 6-speed automatic, replacing the CD4E. As well, new front and 18.5 mm (0.73 in) rear stabilizer bars were added for 2009 to improve ride handling after complaints about diminished performance following the 2008 changes. Other changes included redesigned seats, daytime running lamps, and optional steering-wheel mounted audio controls. The Tribute was discontinued in November 2011 at the end of the 2011 model year, replaced by the Mazda CX-5 for 2012 that is different from the Escape.

=== Mercury ===
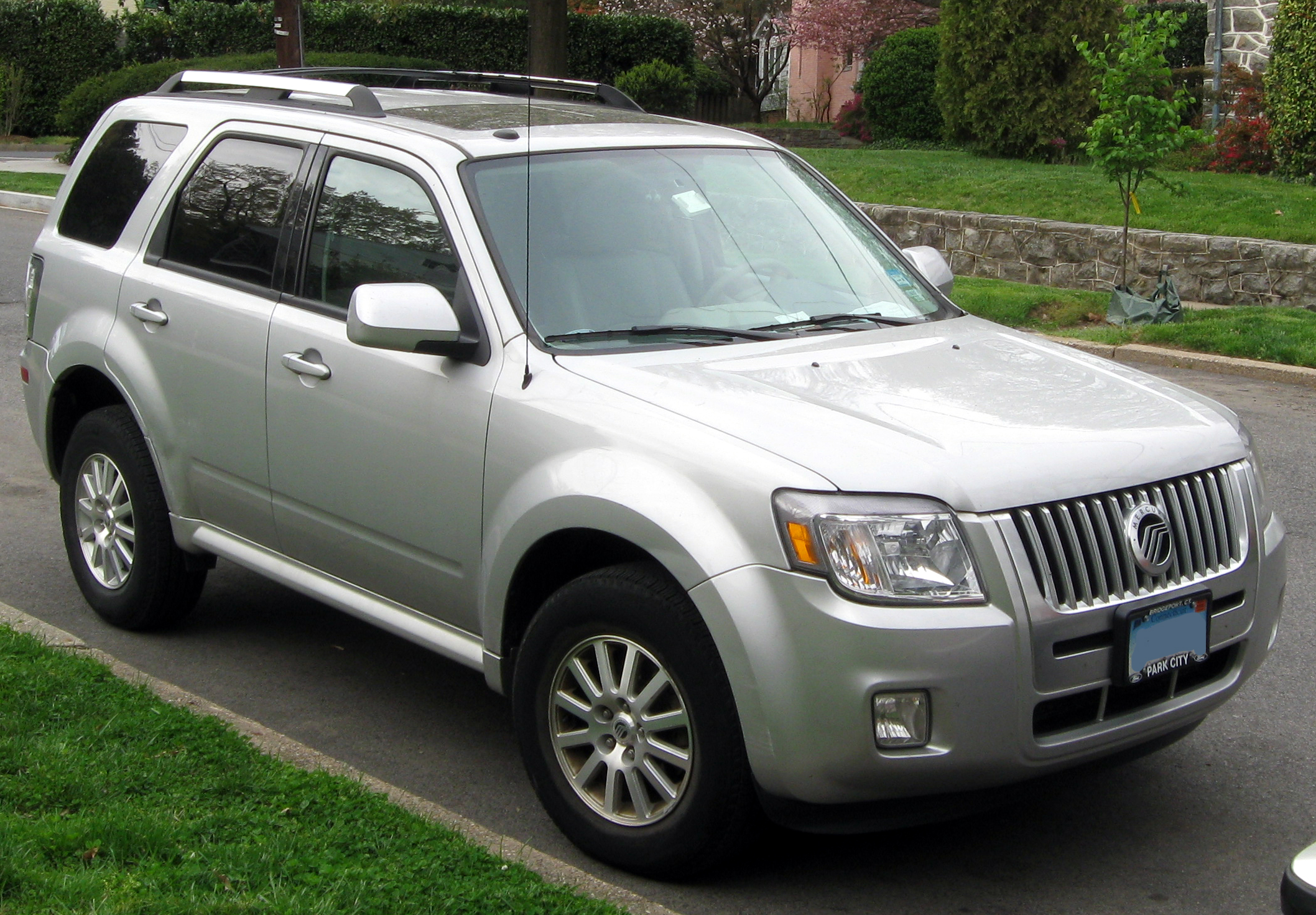
2010–2011 Mercury Mariner

For the 2008 model year, the Mariner was significantly updated with a new look, although it remained on the Ford CD2 platform used by the previous generation. The first 2008 Mercury Mariner was unveiled at the South Florida International Auto Show on October 6, 2006. The changes included a new seats, headlights, taillights, a new liftgate, a higher beltline and new doors and wheels. The interior was also significantly updated with higher quality materials and more refined features. The engines remained the same but the 3.0 L Duratec V6 has been modified to reduce fuel consumption by 10%.

The 2009 Ford Escape and Mercury Mariner were unveiled at the 2008 Washington Auto Show. Sporting a 2.5-liter engine and 6-speed automatic transmission that replaced the four-speed automatic transmission, the new powertrain improved the EPA fuel economy by 1 mile per gallon and increased power by 11% to 170 hp (127 kW). Also, the existing 3.0-liter Duratec V6 was bumped from 200 hp (149 kW) to 240 hp (179 kW). The new engine was also the new basis for Ford's hybrid models, including the Ford Escape Hybrid and Mercury Mariner Hybrid. "For every eight Escape and Mariner vehicles we sell, one of them is a hybrid, and the appeal is growing," says Sue Cischke, Ford senior vice president, Sustainability, Environment and Safety Engineering.

For the 2010 model year, the Mariner added Ford's MyKey and trailer sway controls as standard on all trim levels. Models equipped with the V6 engine became flex-fuel capable. Ford has also done away with the Euro-style turn signal repeaters for this model year. For the 2011 model year, the Mariner featured HD Radio as standard, but continued with the same features as the 2010 models. This version of the Mariner was its last, as Ford discontinued the Mercury brand because of declining sales. The last Mercury Mariner rolled of the assembly line on October 5, 2010.

=== Hybrid ===
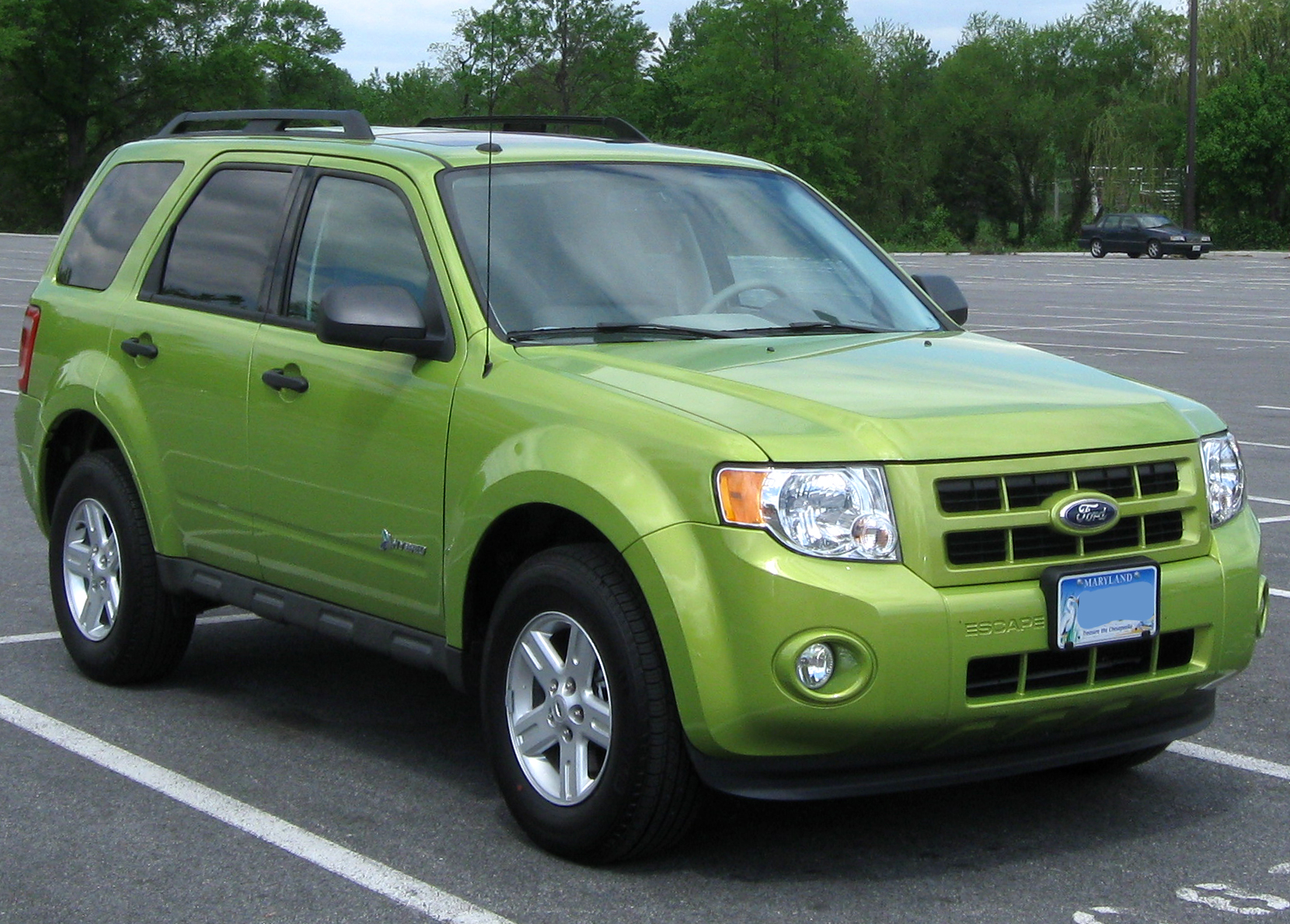
2009–2012 Ford Escape Hybrid

The second-generation Ford Escape Hybrid received some minor styling tweaks inside and out. The major cosmetic changes included new bumpers, grille, headlights, and taillights to match Ford's new edge style. The drivetrain was essentially the same but has had extensive software modifications. For 2009, a larger, more powerful engine was introduced, together with a revised suspension, addition of stability control, the debut of "Sync" voice-control system, and a capless fuel filler system. The batteries and other hybrid components in a 2009 Escape Hybrid added about 136 kg (300 lbs) to the vehicle. However, the added weight was blamed for an adverse effect in handling. Furthermore, from 2009 onward, rear disc brakes of previous years were swapped for drum brakes, which was criticized as a "strange step backward".

The second-generation Escape Hybrid was offered in two levels of specification, an undesignated base model and the more expensive "Limited" trim. The base included: a 60/40 split-fold rear bench seat, AdvanceTrac with roll stability control, and a single-disc four-speaker CD/MP3 stereo with Sirius Satellite Radio compatibility. The "Limited" adds: a chrome front grille, heated front seats, a six-way power driver's seat and full leather upholstery, rear park assist, ambient lighting, and 16-inch six-spoke alloy wheels. For the 2009 model year, Ford SYNC became standard on both Hybrid trims and the "ESCAPE" badges on the front doors were replaced with "HYBRID," while the logo for Ford hybrid models was moved from the fenders to the front doors next to the "HYBRID" text. 2010 models saw the addition of MyKey, trailer sway controls, and integrated spotter mirror for better blind-spot viewing. New optional extras are active park assist and a rear-view camera.

Ford developed a prototype E85 Hybrid Escape, the first flexible-fuel hybrid electric vehicle capable of running on 85% ethanol. In 2007, Ford produced 20 demonstration Escape Hybrid E85s for real-world testing in fleets around the U.S.

From 2009, the gas engine was 2.5L Atkinson-cycle four cylinder engine with 155 hp at 6,000 rpm with an electric motor that produces 94 hp at 5,000 rpm. The maximum combined output of both was 177 hp.

The U.S. Environmental Protection Agency (EPA) rated the fuel economy for the 2010 Escape Hybrid (FWD) at 34 miles per US gallon (6.9 L/100 km; 41 mpg_{‑imp}) city, and 31 miles per US gallon (7.6 L/100 km; 37 mpg_{‑imp}) highway. The following table compares fuel economy, carbon footprint, and petroleum consumption between the hybrid version and other drivetrains of the Escape family as estimated by the EPA and the U.S. Department of Energy. The Escape Hybrid met both California's SULEV and PZEV standards, with tailpipe emissions better than 90% less than the average 2003 new car and zero evaporative emissions.

By early 2012, Ford discontinued the production of the Escape Hybrid as the third-generation Escape was introduced. Two of the new 2013 model year Escapes have direct-injected and turbocharged EcoBoost units (of 1.6 and 2.0 liters) that deliver higher fuel economy than the 2012 model. A total of 122,850 Escape Hybrids were built since 2005, along with 12,300 units of its Mercury sibling, discontinued in 2010.

==== Plug-in hybrid ====
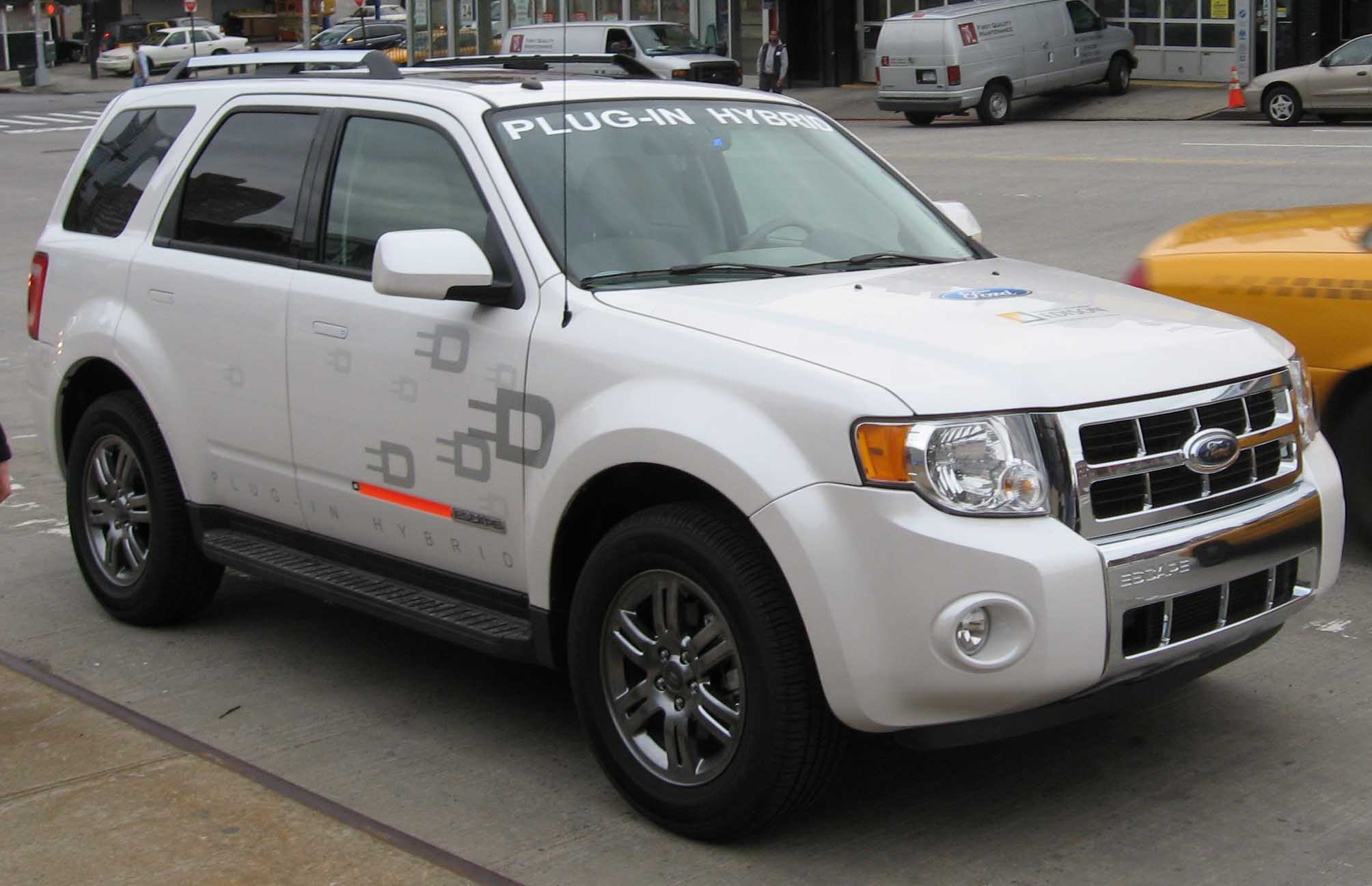
Demonstration Ford Escape plug-in hybrid in New York City

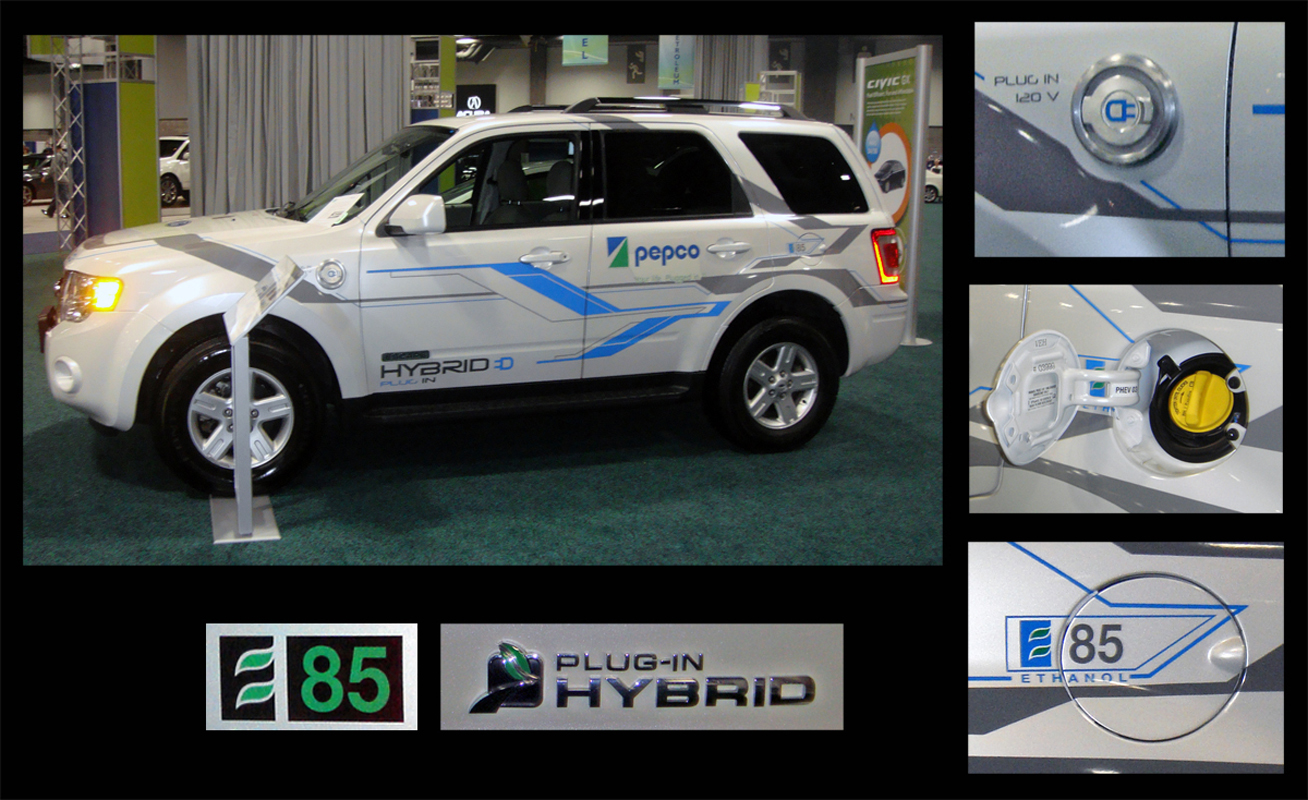
Demonstration Ford Escape E85 flex-fuel plug-in hybrid

Three companies have converted Ford Escape Hybrids to plug-in under a contract with the NYSERDA and delivered them in 2007: Electrovaya of Toronto Canada, Hymotion also of Toronto Canada, Hybrids Plus of Boulder Colorado, United States.

Ford developed a research Escape Plug-in Hybrid and delivered the first of a fleet of 20 to Southern California Edison (SCE) in December 2007 to begin road testing. This project was a collaboration aimed to explore the future of plug-in hybrids and evaluate how the vehicles might interact with the home and the utility's electrical grid. Some of the vehicles were evaluated "in typical customer settings", according to Ford. Ford also developed the first ever flexible-fuel plug-in hybrid SUV, which was delivered to the United States Department of Energy in June 2008. This plug-in version of the Escape Hybrid runs on gasoline or E85 and is also part of the demonstration fleet Ford developed in a partnership with Southern California Edison and the Electric Power Research Institute.

Both the E85 version and the conventional gasoline engine version use a 10 kwh lithium-ion battery, which allows for a 30-mile (48 km) range at 40 miles per hour (64 km/h) or less. When the battery's charge drops to 30%, the vehicle switches to its four-cylinder engine, assisted by the batteries, operating as a regular hybrid electric vehicle. The vehicle has a display system that shows the driver how efficient the vehicle is at any given time. If the vehicle uses its engine and is running in traditional hybrid mode, fuel economy is rated at 88 miles per U.S. gallon (2.7 L/100 km; 106 mpg_{‑imp}) in the city and 50 miles per U.S. gallon (4.7 L/100 km; 60 mpg_{‑imp}) on the highway.

This fleet of 20 Ford Escape Plug-ins was field tested with utility company fleets in California, New York, Ohio, North Carolina, Alabama, Georgia, Massachusetts, Michigan, and Quebec, Canada, with sales scheduled to being in 2012.

In August 2009 Ford delivered the first Escape Plug-in equipped with intelligent vehicle-to-grid (V2G) communications and control system technology to American Electric Power of Columbus, Ohio. This technology allows the vehicle operator to program when to recharge the vehicle, for how long and at what utility rate. The battery systems communicate directly with the electrical grid via smart meters provided by utility companies through wireless networking. During the two years since the demonstration program began, the fleet of Escape Plug-ins has logged more than 75,000 miles (121,000 km), and Ford plans to equip all 21 plug-in hybrid Escapes with the vehicle-to-grid communications technology.

The Ford demonstration vehicles and Hybrids Plus conversions are similar. The conversion involves the replacement of the original NiMH battery, located on the floor of the trunk, with a larger capacity Li-ion battery, in the same location and substantially the same volume as the original battery. The Electrovaya and Hymotion conversions retain the original battery, and augment its capacity with a Li-ion battery that occupies a significant portion of the trunk. In all cases, the conversion also involves the addition of a charger and of a power plug.

== Third generation (2013) ==
Third generation
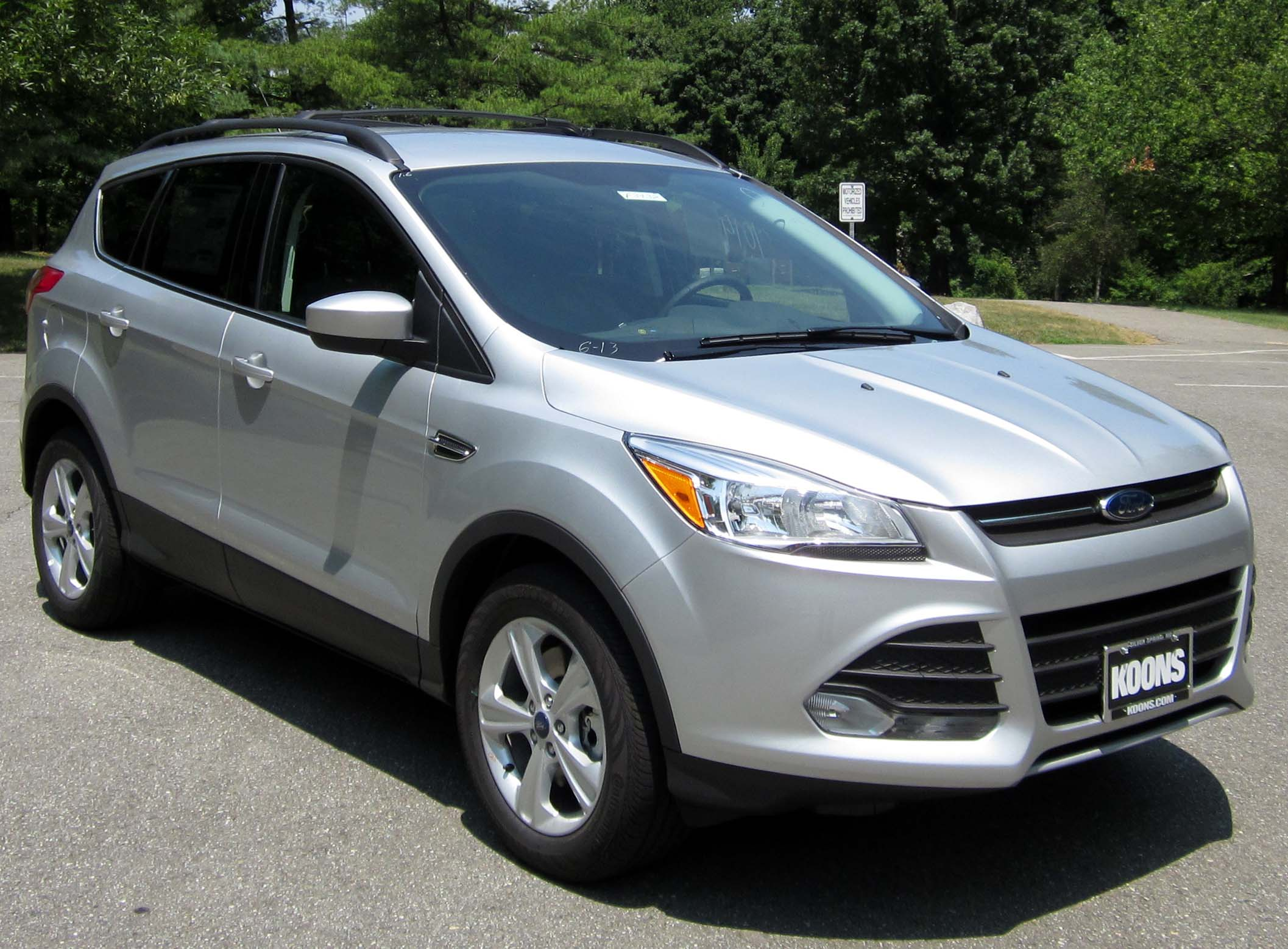

Overview
- Also called: Ford Kuga (Second generation)
- Production: April 2012 – 2019
- Model years: 2013–2019
- Assembly: United States: Louisville, Kentucky (Louisville Assembly Plant); Spain: Valencia (FV, Kuga); China: Chongqing (Changan Ford, Kuga); Taiwan: Chungli (FLH, Kuga); Russia: Yelabuga (FS, Kuga)
- Designer: Patrick Verhee, Stefan Lamm, Andrea Di Buduo, Kemal Curic (2010)

Body and chassis
- Platform: Ford C1
- Related: Lincoln MKC

Powertrain
- Engine: Gasoline: 1.5 L EcoBoost I4-T (2017 refresh); 1.6 L EcoBoost I4-T; 2.0 L EcoBoost I4-T; 2.5 L Duratec I4
- Transmission: 6-speed SelectShift 6F35 automatic 6-speed PowerShift 6DCT450 automatic

Dimensions
- Wheelbase: 2,690 mm (105.9 in)
- Length: 4,524 mm (178.1 in)
- Width: 1,838 mm (72.4 in)
- Height: 1,702 mm (67.0 in)
- Curb weight: 1,580–1,707 kg (3,483–3,763 lb)

The third-generation Escape was first shown at the 2011 Los Angeles Auto Show. It was designed and rebadged by Ford of Europe alongside the largely identical European-market Ford Kuga. It was released to North American markets in 2012 for the 2013 model year. Many markets that previously used the "Escape" nameplate have switched to "Kuga" under the One Ford program, apart from the Middle East where it still bears the "Escape" nameplate.

The third-generation Escape is claimed to be 10 percent more aerodynamic than the previous generation. Also new for the 2013 model year is the MyFord Touch entertainment system, which offers an all-new user interface and additional features. Another new feature is the optional hands-free liftgate. A person carrying the keyless entry transmitter can raise a foot under the rear bumper of the Escape to open the tailgate. Ecofriendly seat fabrics are standard on lower trim levels, and the vehicle's carpeting is mostly constructed from recycled plastic water bottles. This allows the new Escape to be mostly recyclable at the end of its lifecycle.

Production of the 2013 Ford Escape began 11 April 2012, with ceremonies in June 2012. The production of the previous generation 2012 Escape ended on 28 April 2012, overlapping slightly in production with the 2013 model due to plant issues, with the 2012 Ford Escape vehicles being limited in availability at Ford showrooms. In May 2012, the third-generation Escape became available at most dealerships across the United States, and was introduced in Canada starting June.

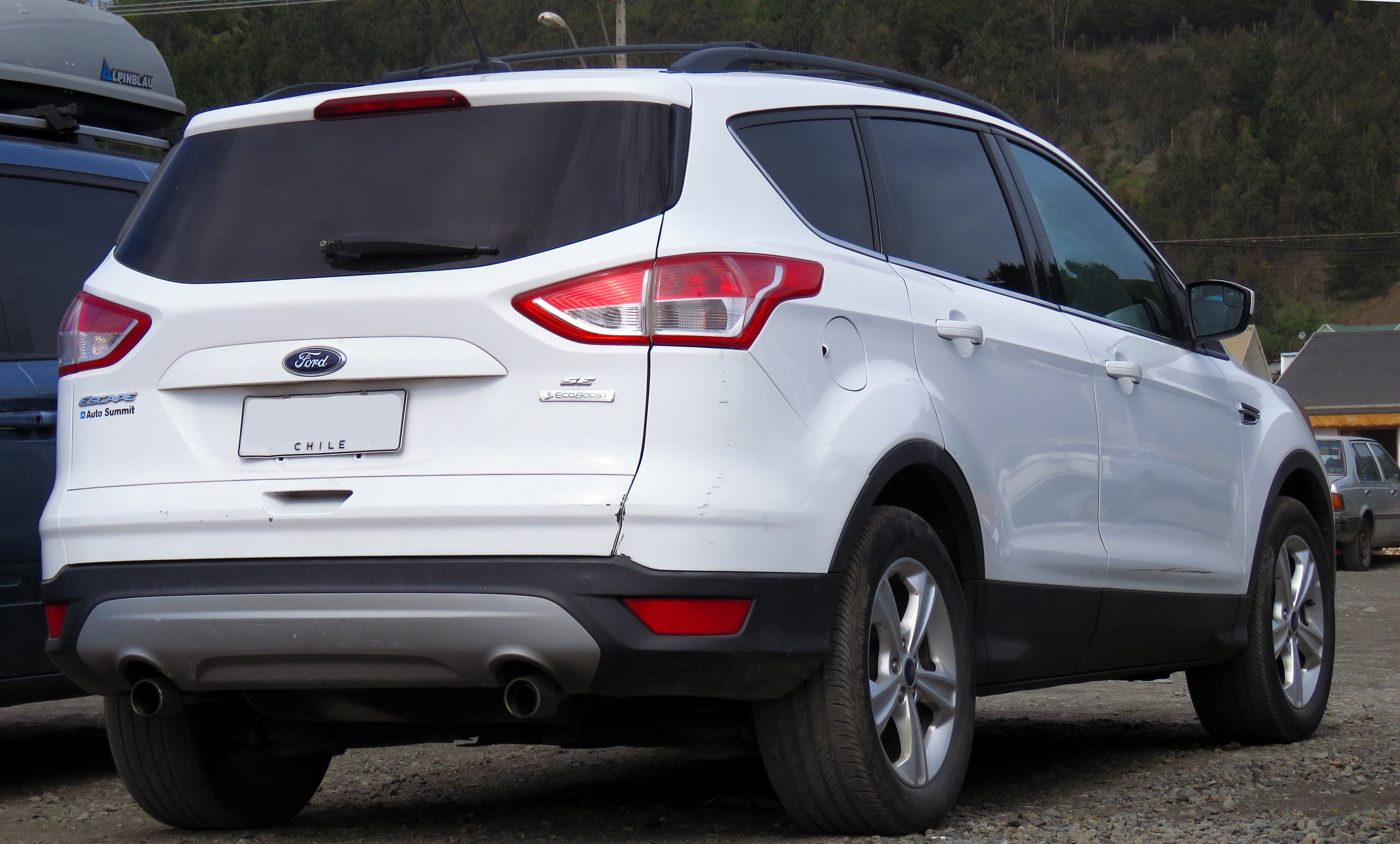
Rear view

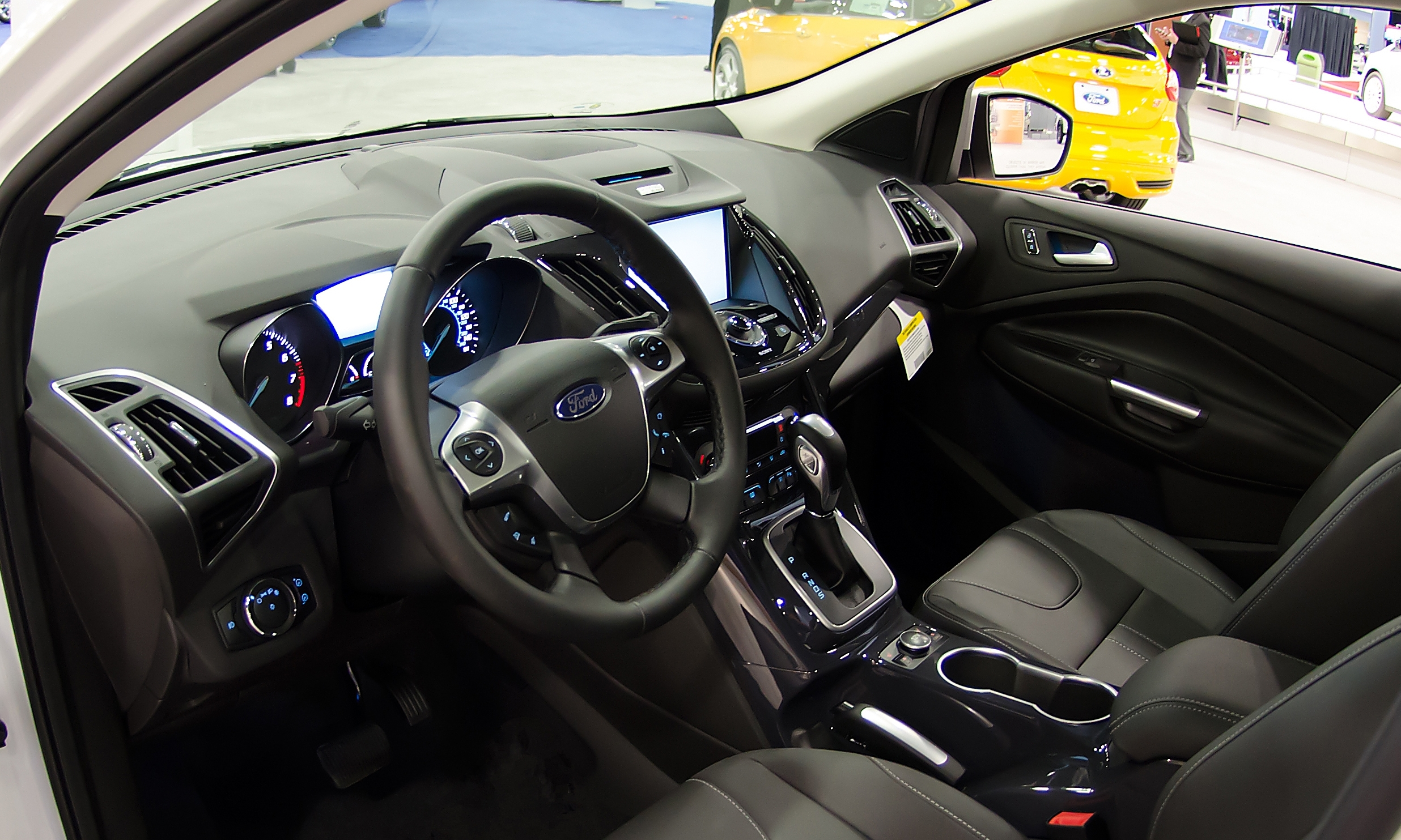
Interior

=== Powertrain ===
The base engine is the 2.5 L Duratec naturally aspirated inline-four engine which made 168 hp (125 kW; 170 PS) and 167 lb⋅ft (226 N⋅m) of torque. This engine was less powerful and efficient than newer EcoBoost engines, but it had lower cost, and was exclusive to the S trim level. On higher trims, two EcoBoost inline four-cylinder turbocharged engines were offered in North America, which were the 2.0 L which made 237 hp (177 kW; 240 PS) and 250 lb⋅ft (340 N⋅m) of torque, and the debuting 1.6 L which made 173 hp (129 kW; 175 PS) and 177 lb⋅ft (240 N⋅m) of torque. Ford claimed that the fuel economy of the new 1.6 L EcoBoost engine would match that of the previous Ford Escape Hybrid, while the new 2.0 L engine produced more torque than the previous 3.0 L V6 unit. The 1.6 L was rated for 26 mpg_{‑US} (9.0 L/100 km) compared to the old hybrid's 32 mpg_{‑US} (7.4 L/100 km) combined by the EPA, though the Ecoboost compared more favorably on the highway with ratings of 32 mpg_{‑US} (7.4 L/100 km) outperforming the hybrid's 30 mpg_{‑US} (7.8 L/100 km).

The transmission is either a six-speed conventional automatic or dual-clutch automatic. The previous generation's hybrid model with its 2.5 L Atkinson powertrain was indirectly replaced by the C-Max Hybrid, and the 3.0 L V6 engine was dropped. Production versions in North America never had a PowerShift option.

=== Trim levels ===
The third-generation Escape was offered with front-wheel drive in the S trim level, and front- or all-wheel drive in the SE, SEL, and Titanium trim levels. The SEL trim was discontinued after the 2013 model year, but was reintroduced for 2018.

For the 2015 model, in the United States and Canada, Ford updated the standard naturally aspirated 2.5 L four-cylinder engine's specification to 168 hp (125 kW) and 170 lb⋅ft (230 N⋅m) of torque. The 2.5 L was only available in FWD configurations only.

=== 2017 refresh ===
On 18 November 2015, Ford unveiled a refreshed mid-cycle update of the Escape, which went on sale in the beginning of 2016 for the 2017 model year. The refresh added an Edge-inspired front fascia, while tweaking the rear facsia that saw reshaped LED taillights and a newly adopted two-slat, hexagonal grille. The interior was also adjusted slightly in the cabin area and on the steering wheel.

The Sync 3 infotainment system was added as a new feature, along with a new smartphone app called Sync Connect, which allows owners to remotely monitor their vehicle, check fuel levels, lock and unlock doors, and start the engine. The 2.5 Duratec and 2.0 EcoBoost engine line-up was joined by a new 179 hp (133 kW; 181 PS) 1.5 L turbocharged four-cylinder option, replacing the 1.6 L.

Ford engineers promised additional refinement to the 2017 Escape, particularly as evidenced by extremely low road- and wind-noise levels. The doors and B pillars are insulated, the front wheel wells are lined, and acoustic glass is used for the side windows. Also, new seals are used for the windshield and hood. The new Escape showcased a number of new-to-it features, from faster-charging USB ports to an application that lets drivers unlock the vehicle and start the engine through a smartphone.

Dubbed Sync Connect, this feature helps to locate the vehicle in a crowded parking lot, check the fuel level, and alert the owner when service is due. A number of driver-assist features were available: Enhanced park assist, lane-keeping, forward collision warning, and adaptive cruise control. Production of the facelifted 2017 Ford Escape started on 18 March 2016, at the Louisville Assembly Plant in Kentucky.

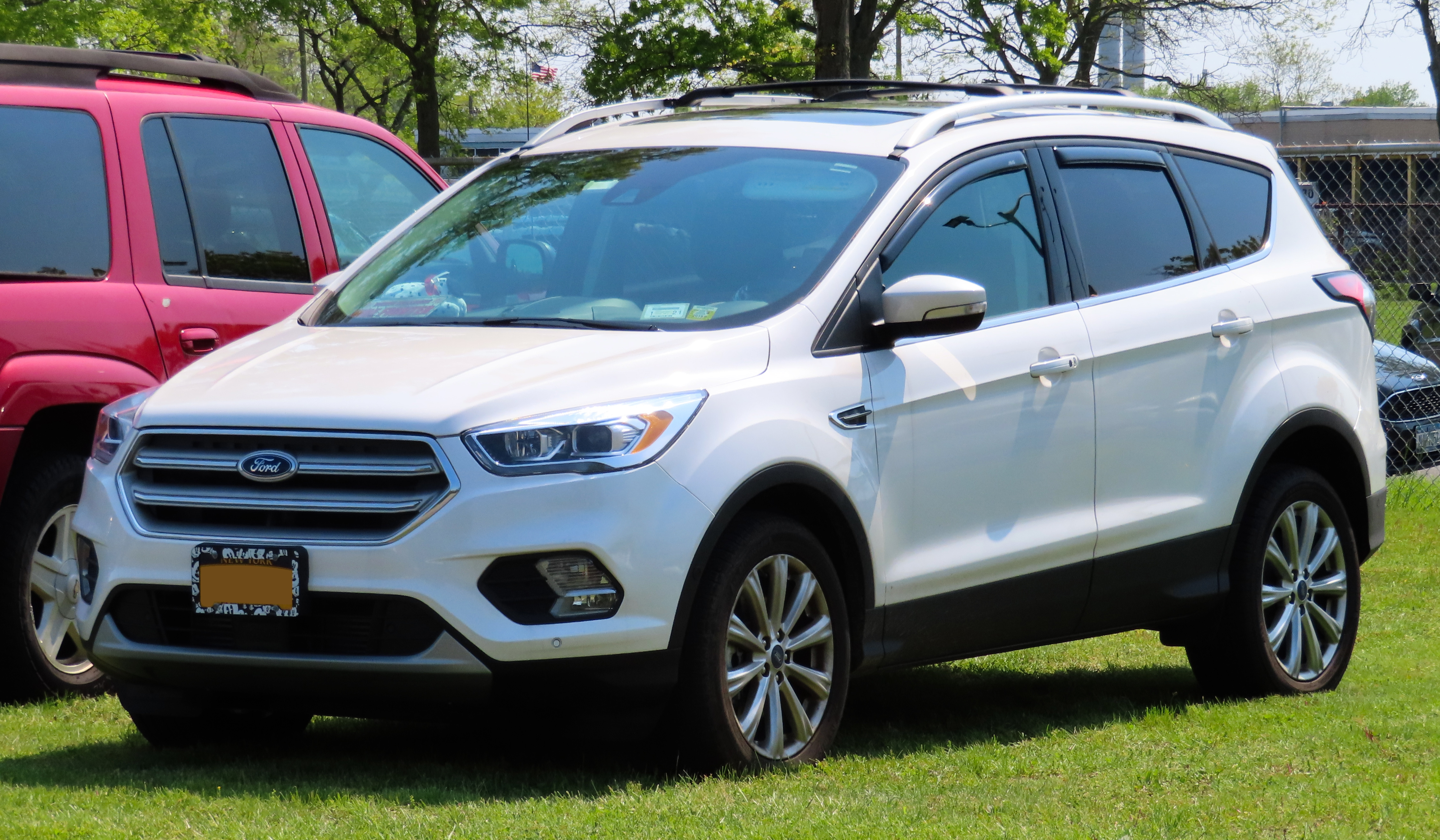
2018 Escape Titanium

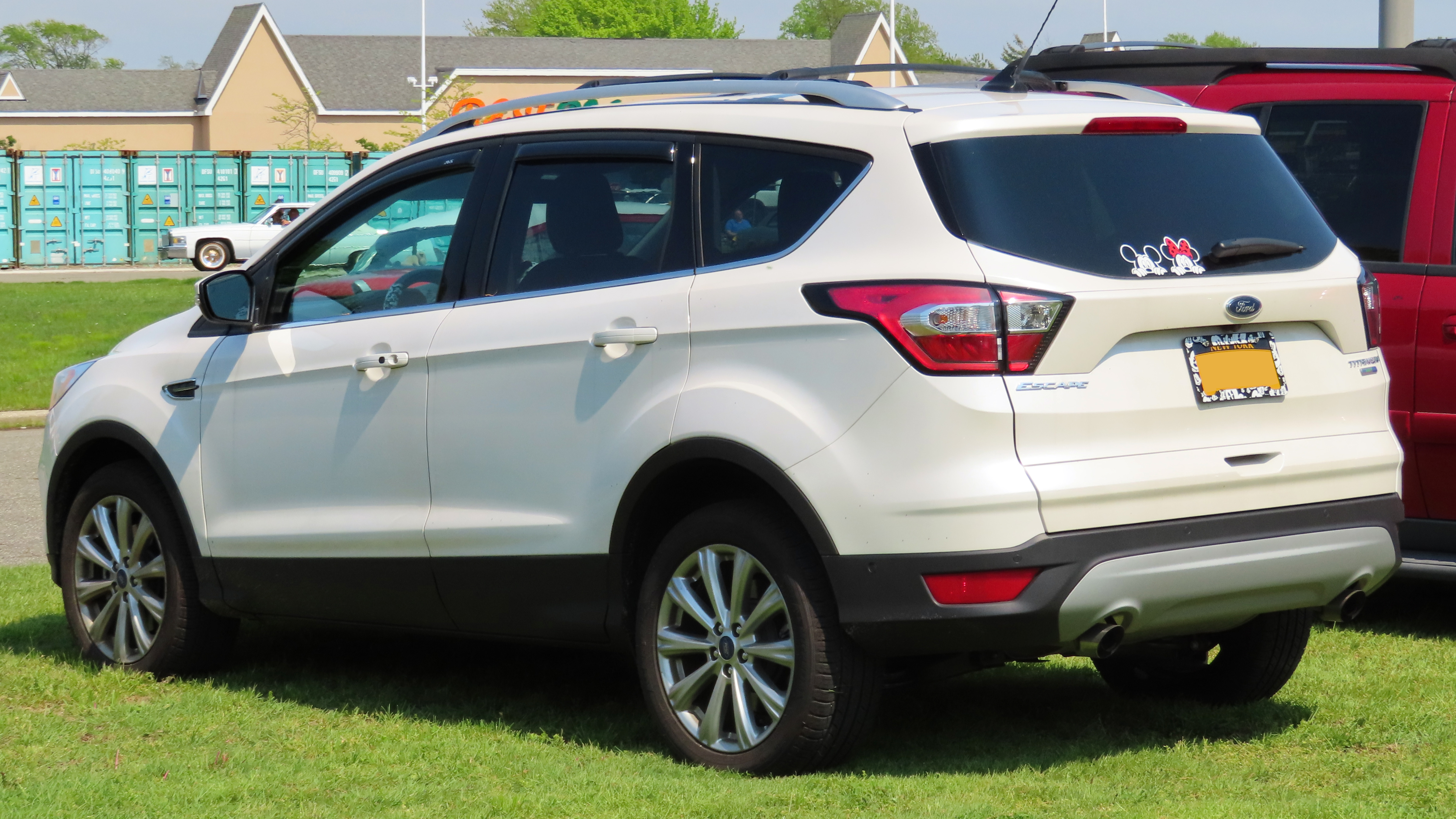
Rear view

=== Safety ===
ANCAP test results* Ford Escape all variants (2017)
Test	Score
Overall	5 /5 stars
Frontal offset	15.33/16
Side impact	16/16
Pole	2/2
Seat belt reminders	3/3
Whiplash protection	Good
Pedestrian protection	Adequate
Electronic stability control	Standard

NHTSA 2013 Ford Escape
Overall:	4/5 stars
Frontal – Driver:	4/5 stars
Frontal – Passenger:	4/5 stars
Side – Driver:	5/5 stars
Side – Passenger:	5/5 stars
Side Pole – Driver:	5/5 stars
Rollover FWD:	/ 19.1%
Rollover AWD:	/ 18.5%

Insurance Institute for Highway Safety (IIHS) scores
Moderate overlap frontal offset	Good
Small overlap frontal offset (driver) 2013–16	Poor
Small overlap frontal offset (driver) 2017–19	Acceptable
Small overlap frontal offset (passenger) 2013–19	Poor
Side impact	Good
Roof strength	Good

=== Recall ===
In March 2017, Ford recalled 692,700 2014 Escapes because of faulty door latches.

=== Fire hazard ===
In December 2012, Ford recalled over 70,000 Escapes in the United States and Canada with 1.6 L engines that may overheat and cause fires, after 12 reports of fires in Escapes were reported to Ford.

In November 2013, Ford recalled over 160,000 Escapes with 1.6 L EcoBoost engines because of oil and fuel leaks that could lead to engine fires, after 13 fires caused by leaks were reported to Ford; the recall also covered about 12,000 to correct fuel lines installed incorrectly that could become chafed and leak gasoline.

In March 2017, Ford recalled 2014 Escapes with 1.6 L EcoBoost engines because of a risk of engine fires caused by a "lack of coolant circulation". The recall partly contributed to a charge of US$300 million by Ford.

== Fourth generation (2020) ==
Fourth generation
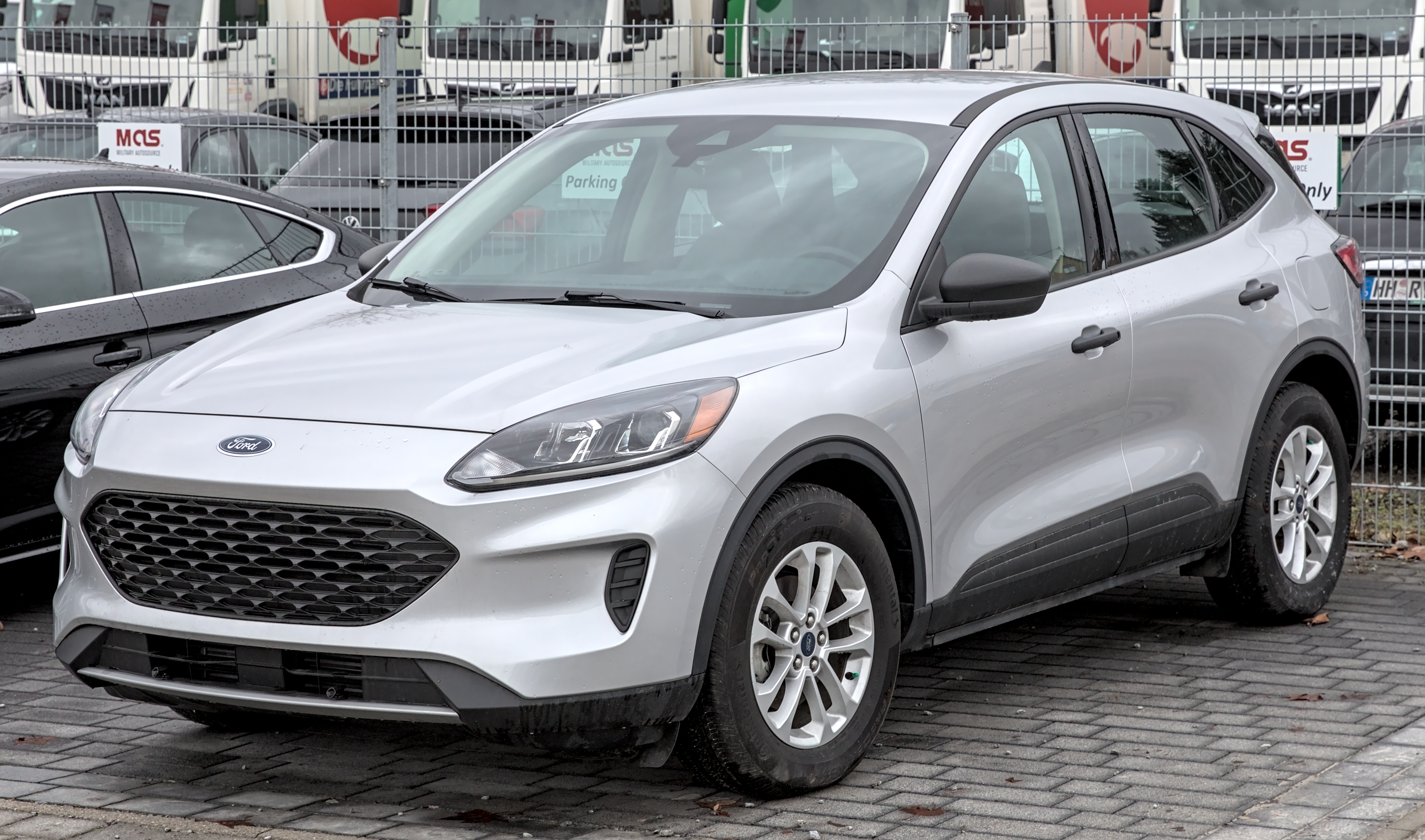

Overview
- Also called: Ford Kuga
- Production: August 2019 – December 2025 (US); 2019–2026 (Spain)
- Model years: 2020–2026
- Assembly: United States: Louisville, Kentucky (Louisville Assembly Plant); China: Chongqing (Changan Ford); Spain: Valencia (Valencia Plant, Kuga); Germany: Cologne (Cologne Body & Assembly, Vignale trim); Taiwan: Chungli (FLH, Kuga)
- Designer: Andrew Bazinski; Christopher Giroux, Nedzad Mujcinovic, Jordan Demkiw (facelift)

Body and chassis
- Platform: Ford C2
- Related: Lincoln Corsair; Ford Bronco Sport; Ford Maverick; Ford Focus (fourth generation)

Powertrain
- Engine: Gasoline: 1.5 L EcoBoost I3 turbo; 2.0 L EcoBoost I4 turbo; Gasoline hybrid / plug-in hybrid: 2.5 L iVCT Atkinson cycle I4
- Electric motor: 88 kW (120 PS; 118 hp) permanent magnet synchronous
- Power output: List: Gasoline: 181 hp (184 PS; 135 kW) (1.5 L EcoBoost); 250 hp (253 PS; 186 kW) (2.0 L EcoBoost); Gasoline hybrid: 200 hp (203 PS; 149 kW) (2.5 L Hybrid, combined); Gasoline plug-in hybrid: 209 hp (212 PS; 156 kW) (2.5 L PHEV, combined); 165 hp (167 PS; 123 kW) (1.5 L PHEV, combined)
- Transmission: 8-speed 8FM SelectShift automatic; PowerSplit CVT
- Hybrid drivetrain: Power-split hybrid; Plug-in power-split hybrid
- Battery: 1.1 kWh lithium-ion (hybrid); 14.4 kWh lithium-ion (plug-in hybrid); 15.1 kWh lithium-ion (plug-in hybrid, China)

Dimensions
- Wheelbase: 106.7 in (2,710 mm)
- Length: 180.5 in (4,585 mm)
- Width: 74.1 in (1,882 mm)
- Height: 66.1 in (1,679 mm)
- Curb weight: 3,299–3,551 lb (1,496–1,611 kg); 3,554–3,706 lb (1,612–1,681 kg) (FHEV); 3,884 lb (1,762 kg) (PHEV)

Chronology
- Predecessor: Ford C-Max (Escape Hybrid)
- Successor: Ford Bronco Sport

The fourth-generation Escape debuted on April 2, 2019, and went on sale in the third quarter of 2019 as a 2020 model. It is manufactured at the Louisville Assembly Plant in Louisville, Kentucky. It is related to the third-generation Ford Kuga, outside North America.

Compared to its predecessor, the model is claimed to be lighter by over 200 pounds (91 kg) while occupying a footprint that is larger due to a wider track and longer length. With its larger size, the Escape provides more interior space for occupants by increasing headroom, shoulder space, and hip room for both rows of seats. Combustion-powered models are equipped with sliding second-row seats that allows a maximum of 37.5 cubic feet (1,062 L) of cargo space.

In China and Taiwan, the fourth generation Escape has a slightly restyled front fascia compared to the North American version, and would be sold alongside the previous generation, which was sold as the Ford Kuga.

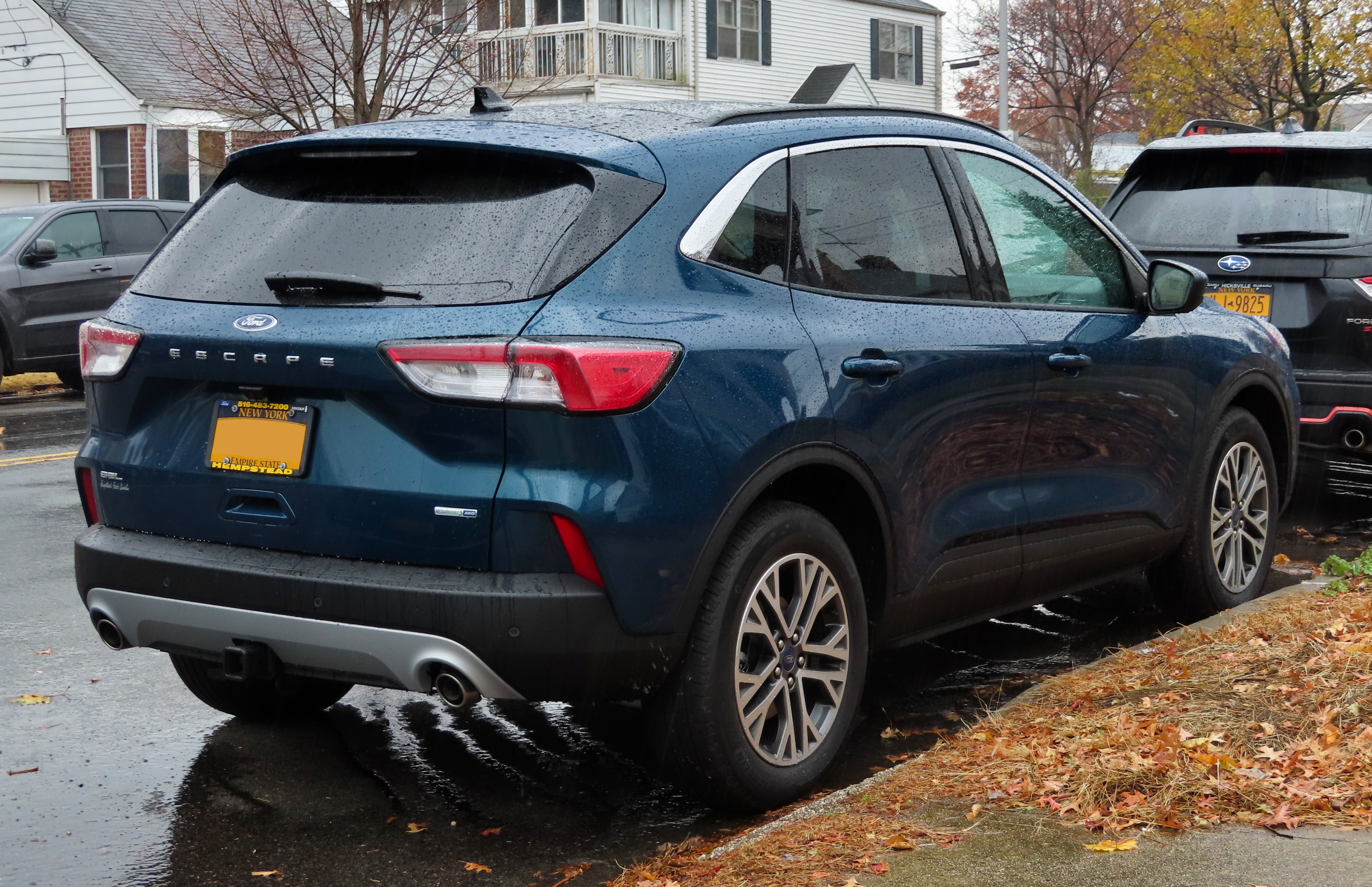
Rear view

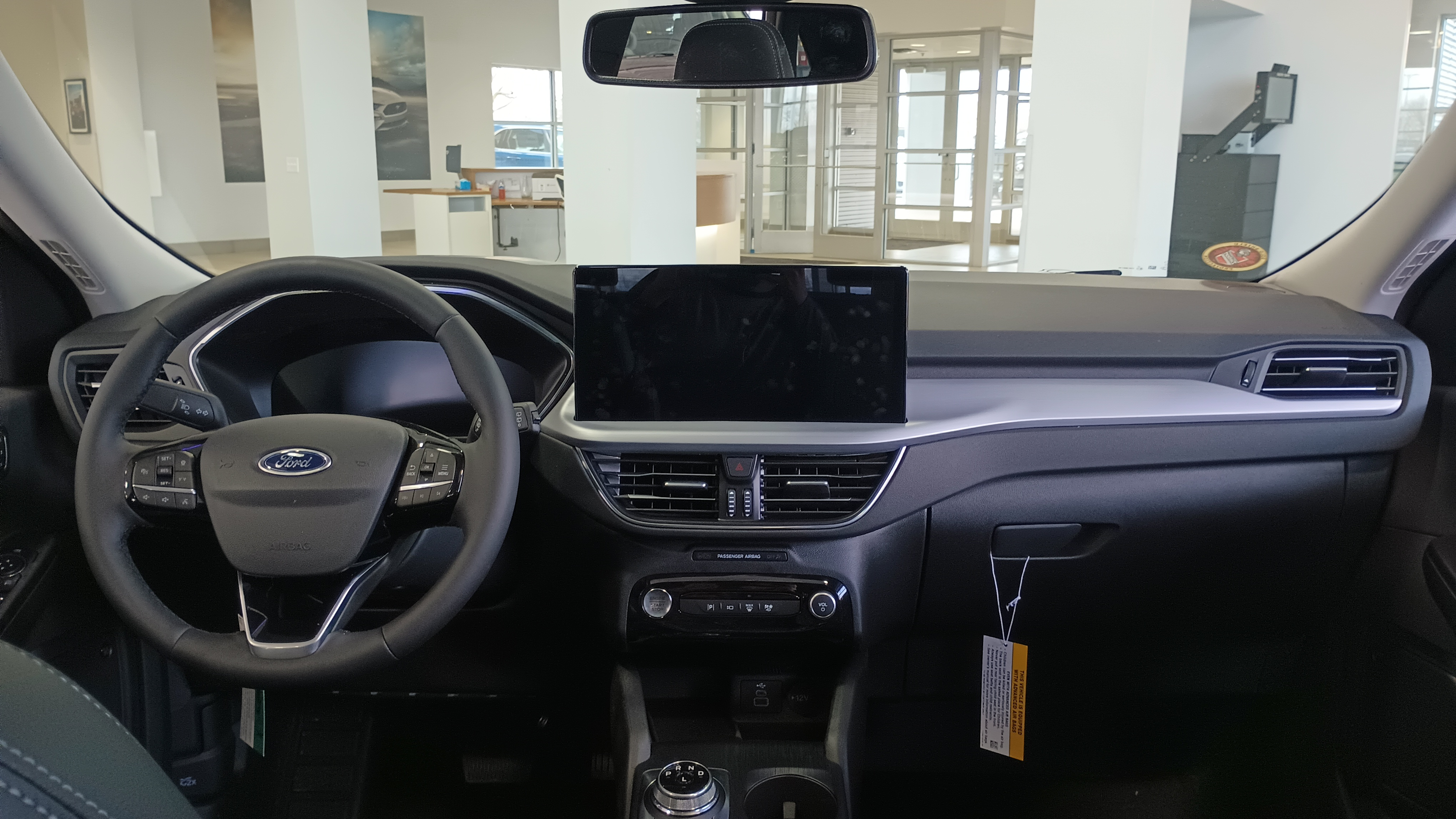
Interior

=== Powertrain ===
There are four new engine-transmission combinations including a plug-in gas-electric hybrid that can go 37 miles (60 km) on electricity alone with an efficiency rating of 100 MPGe, as well as a conventional hybrid and two turbocharged engines mated to an eight-speed automatic transmission.

The base engine, a turbocharged 1.5-liter inline three-cylinder, makes 181 hp (184 PS; 135 kW) and 190 lb⋅ft (258 N⋅m; 26.3 kg⋅m) of torque. It is paired with an eight-speed automatic transmission with front-wheel drive or optional all-wheel drive. An available turbocharged 2.0-liter four-cylinder engine makes 250 hp (253 PS; 186 kW) and 280 lb⋅ft (380 N⋅m) of torque but only comes with all-wheel drive.

The Escape Hybrid, returning after an extended absence, and all-new plug-in hybrid are powered by a 2.5-liter gasoline inline-four that runs on the more efficient Atkinson cycle, along with two electric motors and a planetary gearset that combines the two power sources and allows for gear-ratio changes, essentially operating as a continuously variable transmission setup known as an eCVT. The standard hybrid's battery pack is rated at 1.1 kilowatt-hours, while the plug-in hybrid's is significantly larger, at 14.4 kWh with a 10.7 kWh usable capacity; both are lithium-ion packs that fit underneath the cabin floor. Combined horsepower for the standard hybrid is 200 hp (203 PS; 149 kW), while the plug-in has 209 hp (212 PS; 156 kW) combined.

In China, the Escape plug-in hybrid comes with CAF384WQ2P 1.5-liter three-cylinder turbocharged gasoline engine that produces 170 hp (127 kW; 172 PS) at 6000rpm and 155 lb⋅ft (210 N⋅m) of torque from 1750-4500rpm, paired with a TZ236XYHF45 permanent magnet synchronous motor outputting 131 PS (96 kW; 129 hp) and 173 lb⋅ft (235 N⋅m); combined output is 165 hp (123 kW; 167 PS) through an eCVT transmission. The battery is a 15.1 kWh liquid-cooled 400 V NMC pack which allows for an NEDC range of 77 kilometres (48 mi).

=== Markets ===
==== United States ====
In the United States, the Escape was available in five trim levels from 2020 to 2022: S, SE, SE Sport (2020 only, becoming an appearance package on SE trim from 2021 to 2022), SEL, and Titanium. All trims except for the S trim (only available with a gasoline engine) and the SE Sport (only available as a gasoline hybrid model) are available with gasoline-only, gasoline hybrid, and gasoline plug-in hybrid (PHEV) powertrains. All models offer a choice of either front-wheel drive or all-wheel drive, except for PHEV models which are only available with front-wheel drive. The S trim was only available with the 1.5 EcoBoost inline-3 cylinder engine for all model years.

The PHEV model became available in U.S. dealers in October 2021 for the 2021 model year.

==== Mexico ====
On October 17, 2019, this generation went on sale in Mexico with the 2.0-liter Ecoboost and 2.5-liter hybrid powertrains. For 2022, the Ecoboost engine was dropped and was indirectly replaced by the newly introduced Ford Territory, making the Escape a hybrid only model in the country.

==== Australia ====
The fourth-generation Escape became available in Australia in the third quarter of 2020, designated as the ZH series. While marketed as the Escape, the Australian model adopts the exterior styling from the European Kuga as the vehicles are sourced from Spain and Germany. Powertrain options include a 2.0-litre EcoBoost gasoline engine and a 2.5-litre plug-in hybrid. Trim levels offered are standard, ST-Line, and Vignale. Ford discontinued the Escape in Australia in 2023 due to poor sales, and is being indirectly replaced by the electric Mustang Mach-E.

==== Middle East ====
The fourth-generation Escape was launched in the GCC markets in 2021. It is powered by the 1.5-litre turbo petrol engine and it is offered in two grades, Ambiente and Trend. The Escape was discontinued in 2022 and was indirectly replaced by the Ford Territory.

==== China and Taiwan ====
In China, the fourth-generation Escape (Chinese: 锐际; pinyin: ruì jì) was initially sold alongside its predecessor, which was sold as the Kuga in China. The Chinese market version features a restyled front fascia with a larger grille, and the blue oval logo being positioned in the center of the grille. However, the ST-line trim has the same design as European model. The Escape also comes with a localized entertainment system called Sync+ with a larger display. The same styling variant is sold as the Ford Kuga in the Taiwanese market with the 1.5-liter engine models, while 2.0-liter engine models were sold with European style front grille.

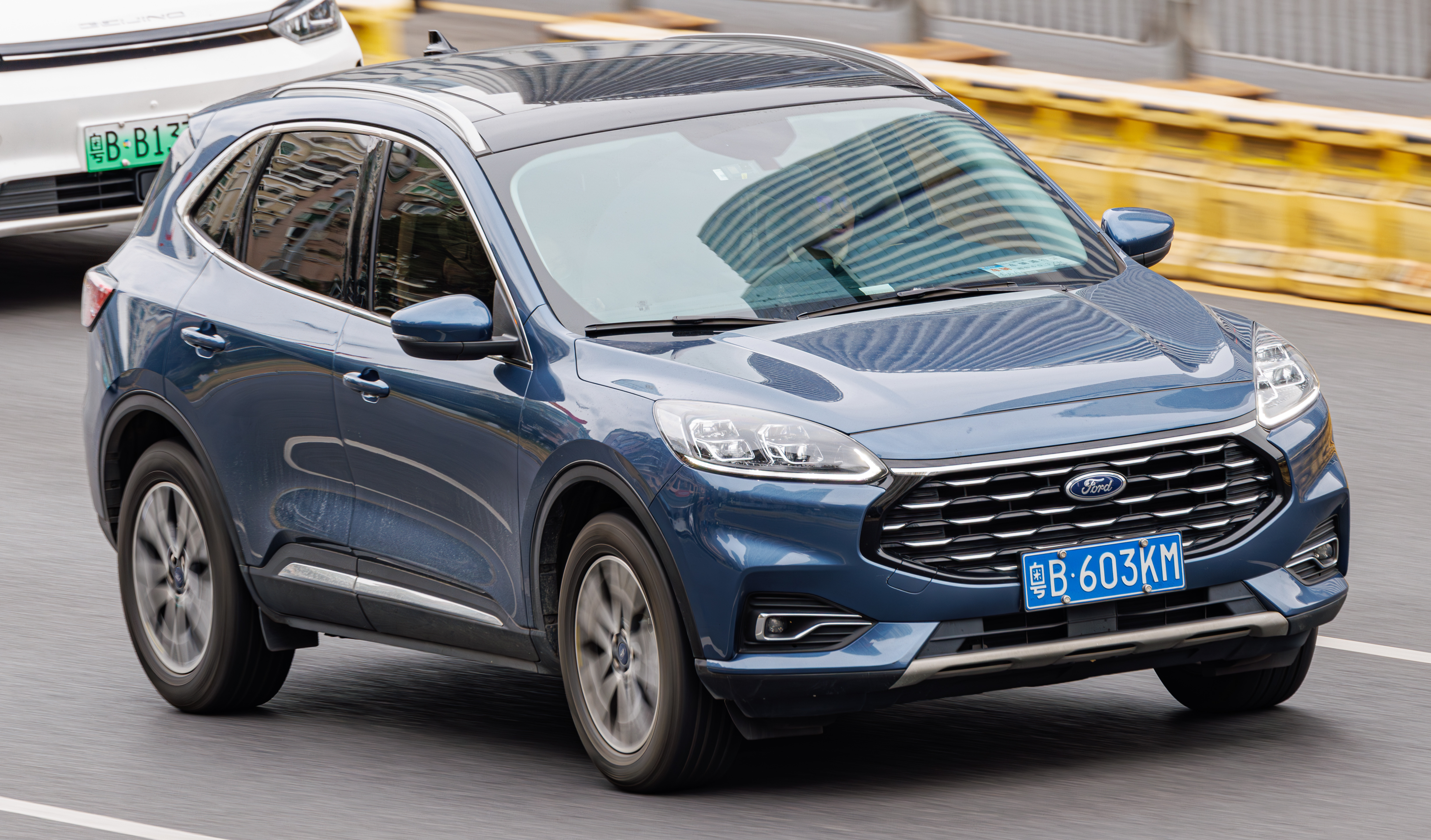
Ford Escape (China)

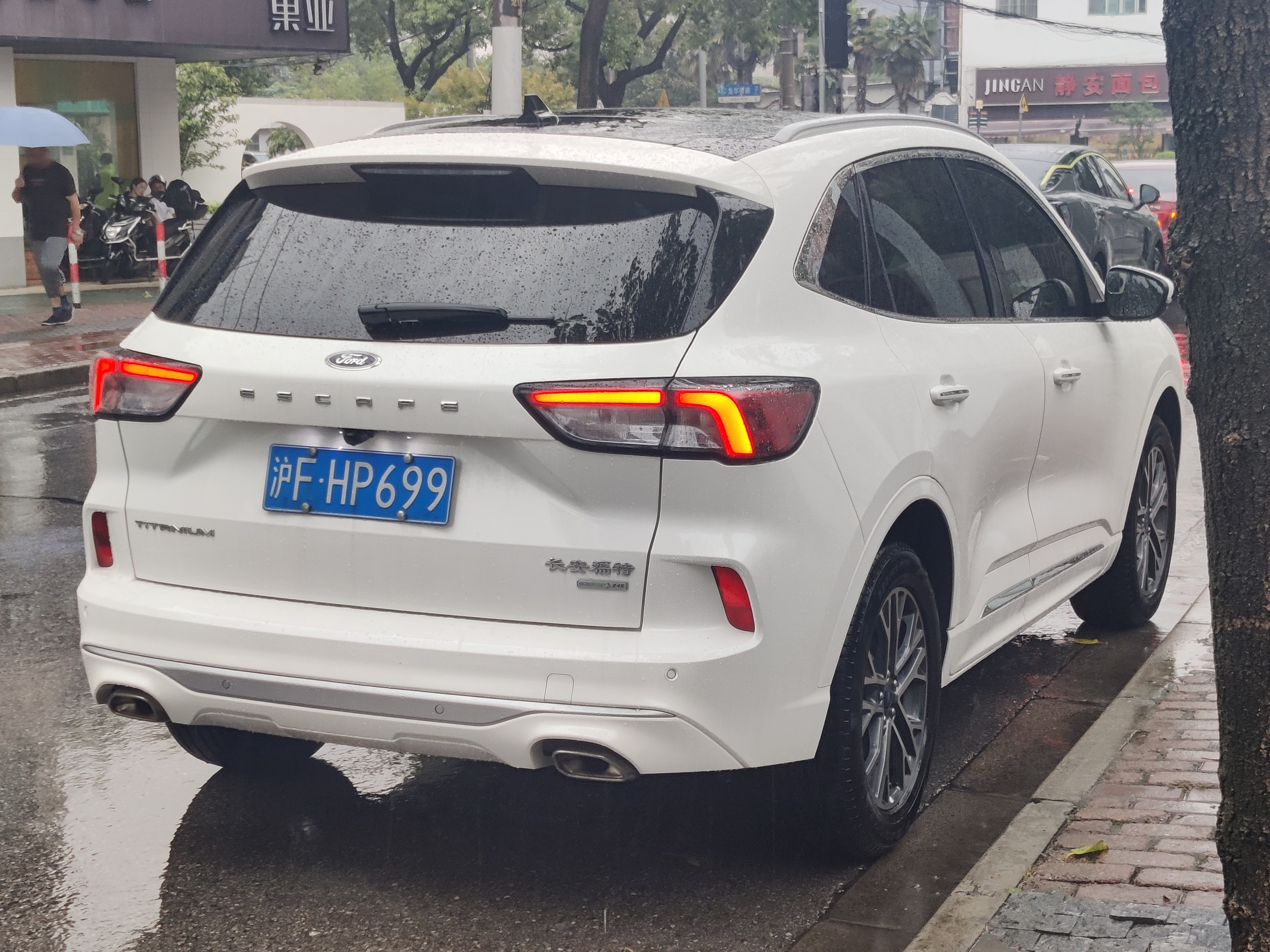
Rear view

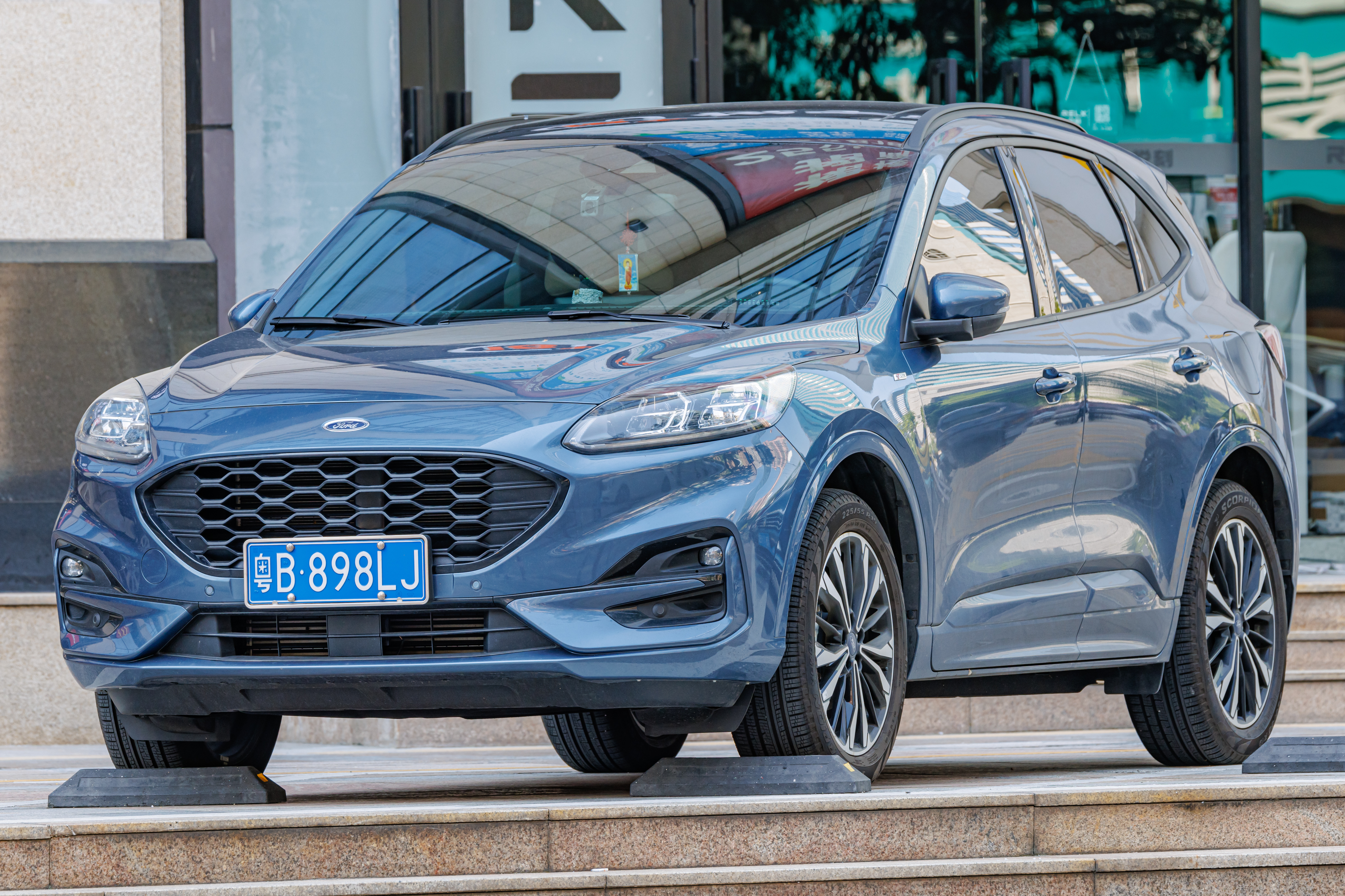
ST-Line

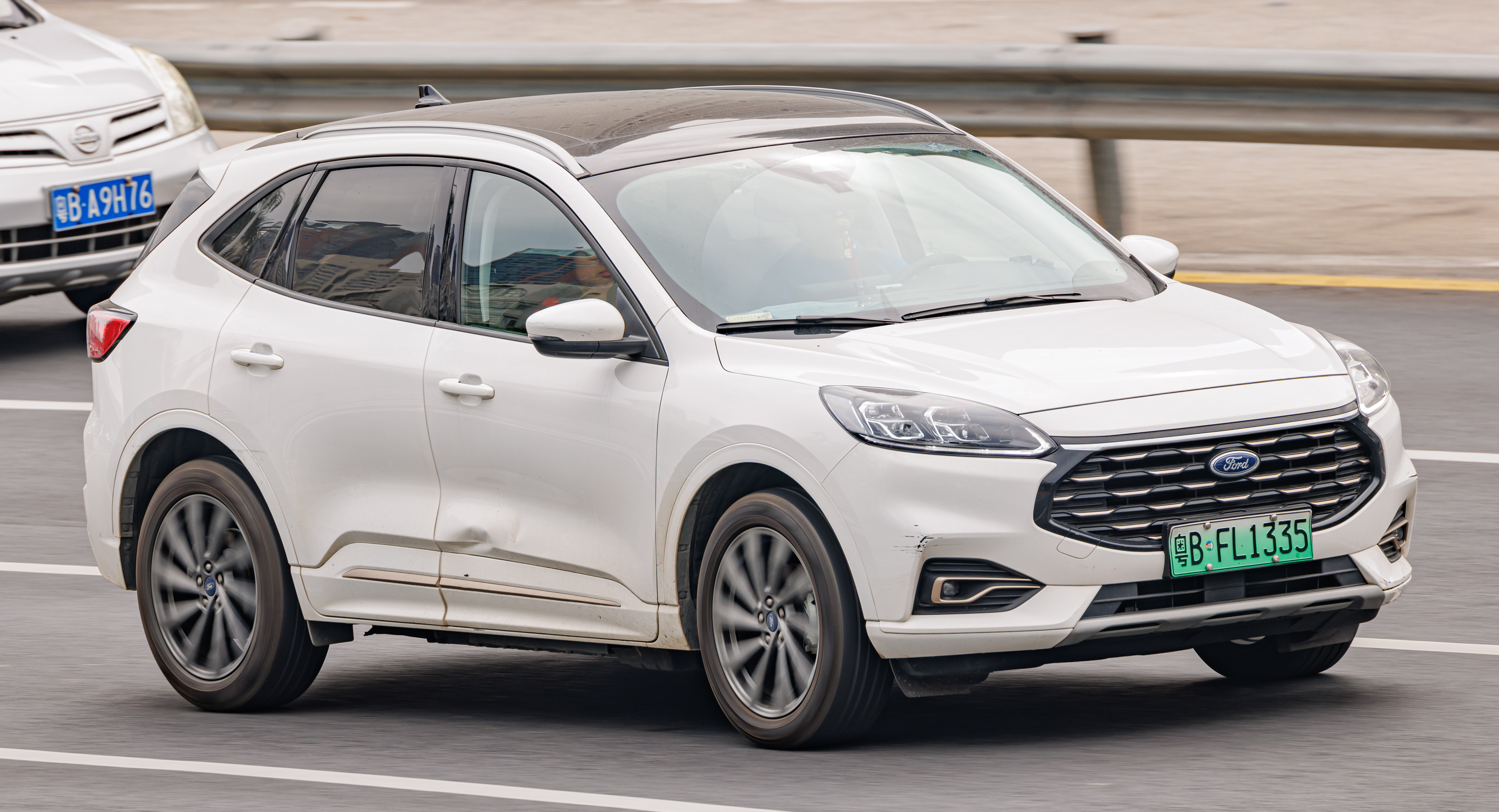
PHEV

=== 2023 refresh ===
Ford announced a refreshed Escape lineup for the North American market in October 2022 for the 2023 model year. The exterior featured minor changes including an updated grille and headlights, restyled taillights that lack amber turn signal bulbs in the US and an optional front light bar. While the power output remains the same, both EcoBoost engines were heavily reworked to meet emissions standards. The hybrid and plug-in hybrid were only slightly modified, and power ratings drop slightly due to following new SAE J2908 measurement methods.

The interior features updates to the console and infotainment system. All models became standard with a digital gauge cluster, with an 8-inch screen flanked by digital temperature and fuel level gauges coming standard, and the optional 12.3 inch LCD dashboard is retained with updated graphics. The 8-inch LCD infotainment system is retained for lower models, while higher models receive a new 13.2 inch infotainment system with SYNC 4. Models with the 8-inch infotainment screen retain physical knobs and buttons for the climate controls, while the new larger screen setup only has up to 6 shortcut buttons and a volume knob; all climate and vehicle settings are controlled via the touchscreen.

The previous trim lineup was entirely replaced, with the S, SE, and Titanium trims supplanted by Base, Active, and Platinum, respectively; the SEL trim was also discontinued and indirectly replaced with three "ST-Line" trim levels: ST-Line, ST-Line Select, and ST-Line Elite. Meanwhile, the plug-in hybrid version, previously offered in combination with other trims, became a standalone trim. Like the S trim in the pre-facelift, the Base trim was too only available with the 1.5 EcoBoost inline-3 cylinder engine again, for all model years.

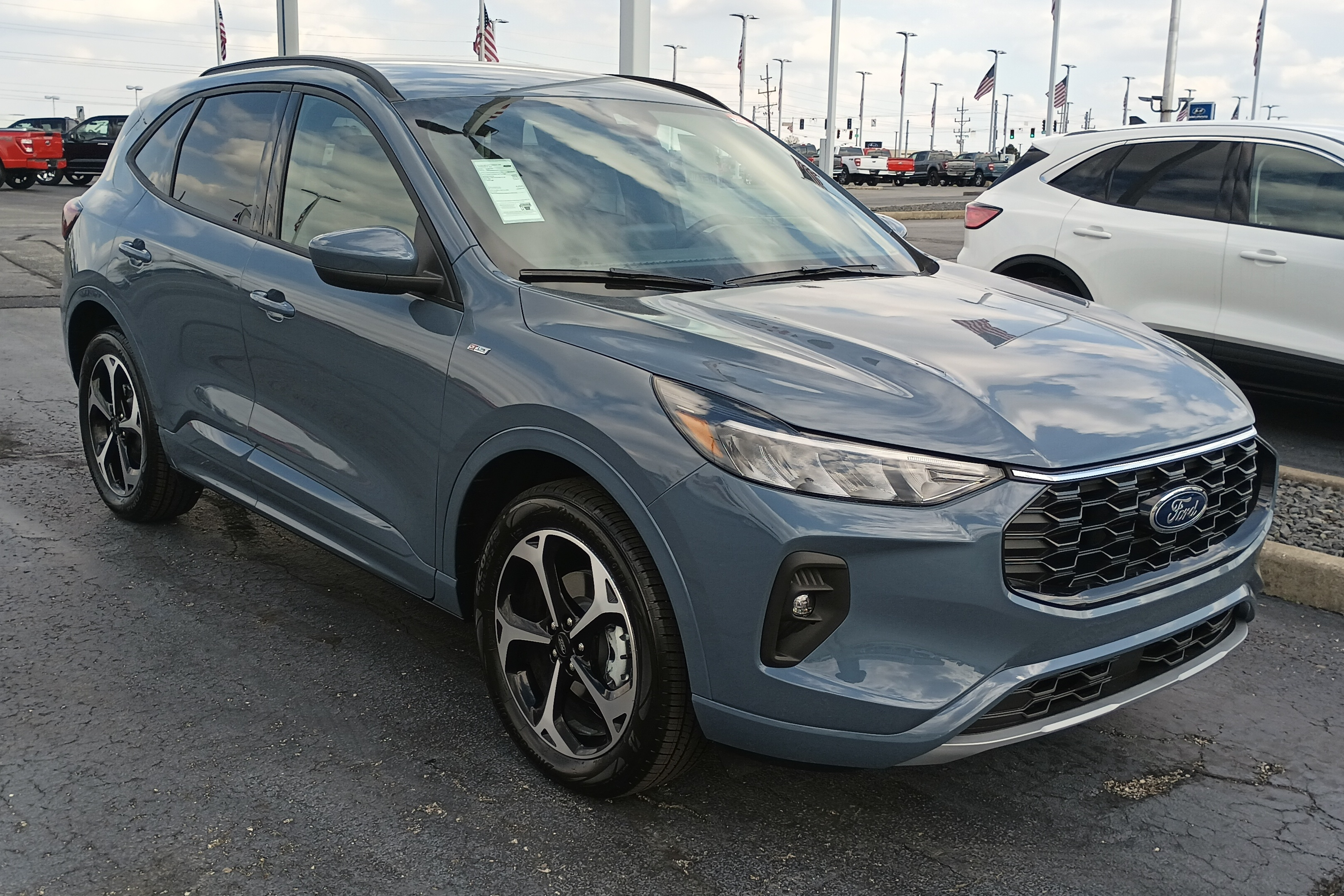
2023 Escape ST-Line Hybrid

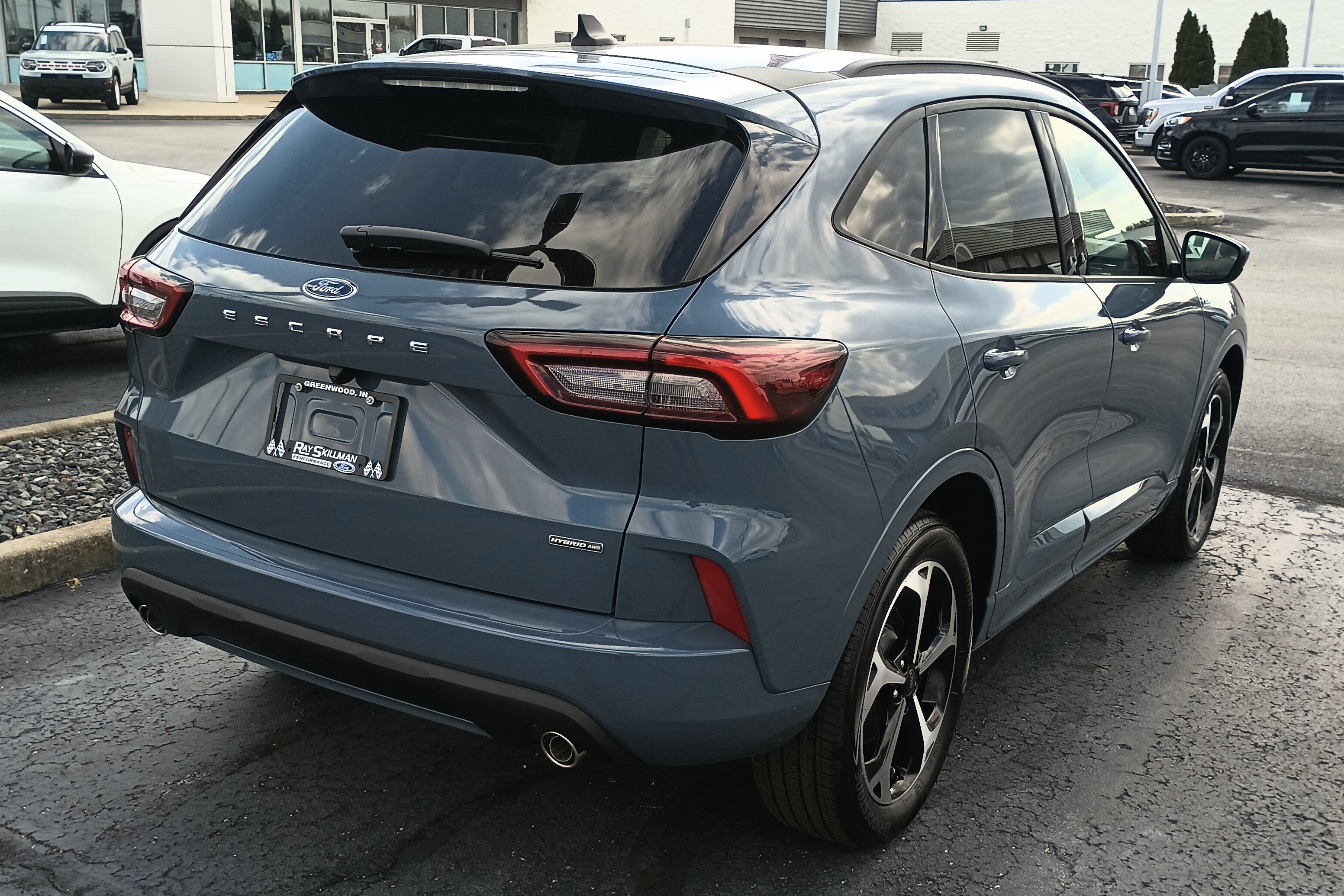
Rear view

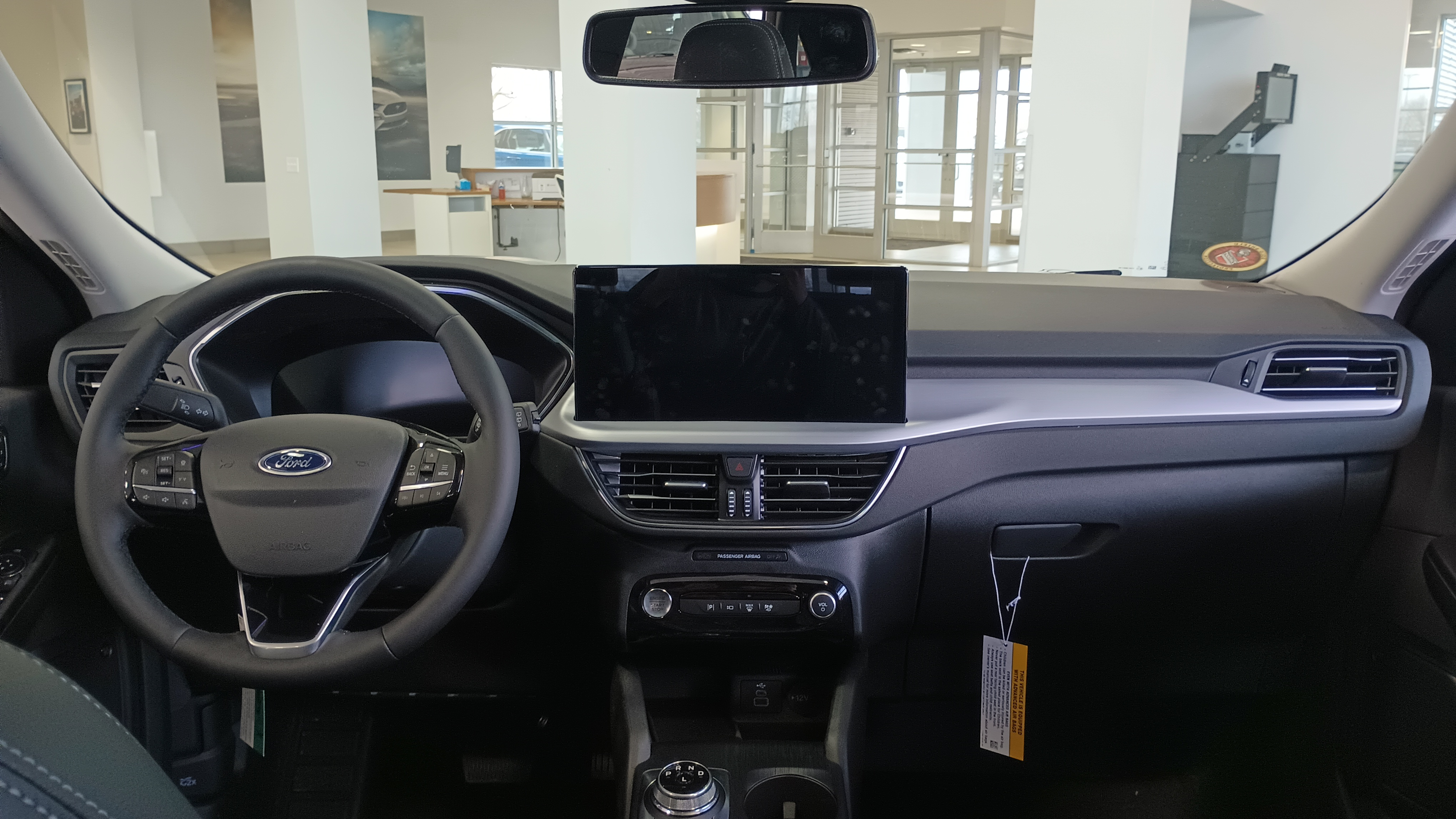
Interior with 12.3" dashboard and 13.2" infotainment screens

=== Safety ===
ANCAP test results* Ford Escape all variants (2019, aligned with Euro NCAP)
Test	Points	%
Overall:	5 /5 stars	
Adult occupant:	35.2	92%
Child occupant:	43.6	89%
Pedestrian:	39.6	82%
Safety assist:	10	77%

The 2020 Escape was awarded the "Top Safety Pick" by the Insurance Institute for Highway Safety.

IIHS scores
Small overlap front (Driver)	Good		
Small overlap front (Passenger)	Good		
Moderate overlap front	Good		
Side (original test)	Good		
Side (updated test)	Marginal		
Roof strength	Good		
Head restraints and seats	Good		
Headlights	Acceptable	Marginal	varies by trim/option
Front crash prevention (Vehicle-to-Vehicle)	Superior		optional
Front crash prevention (Vehicle-to-Vehicle)	Superior		standard
Front crash prevention (Vehicle-to-Pedestrian, day)	Advanced		optional
Front crash prevention (Vehicle-to-Pedestrian, day)	Superior		standard
Child seat anchors (LATCH) ease of use	Good+		

== Discontinuation ==
Ford Escape production ended in the United States in December 2025 at the Louisville Assembly plant in Kentucky, marking the conclusion of the Escape's 25-year run. The 2026 model year represents a final inventory phase-out, with no new production planned. Ford plans to retool the Louisville Assembly plant for electric vehicle production, including the Ford Fathom. The 2026 model year Escape is not available for sale in certain states which follow CARB standards as Ford did not certify the 2026 model year Escape for emissions requirements under the California Air Resources Board.

The Ford Escape continued production into 2026 for the New Zealand market. Assembled alongside European-market Ford Kuga in Valencia, Spain. Production of the Escape for New Zealand ended in early 2026.

== Sales ==
=== Ford Escape ===
Year	United States	Australia	Mexico	China	
Year	United States	Australia	Mexico	Escape	PHEV
2000	42,635				—
2001	164,184	2,842			—
2002	145,471	3,606			—
2003	167,678	3,238			—
2004	183,430	3,252			—
2005	165,122	2,685	9,796		—
2006	157,395	2,852	9,716		—
2007	165,596	2,639	10,857		—
2008	156,544	1,794	12,260		—
2009	173,044	1,039	8,281		—
2010	191,026	3,034	8,916		—
2011	254,293	2,512	10,938		—
2012	261,008	939	8,618		—
2013	295,993		9,899		—
2014	306,212		7,773		—
2015	306,492		7,085		—
2016	307,069		7,625		—
2017	308,296		6,744	29,099	—
2018	272,228		5,276	31,149	—
2019	241,388		3,939	8,898	—
2020	178,496		1,398	10,905	—
2021	145,415		1,455	36,286	444
2022	137,370		3,126	26,063	238
2023	140,968		2,218	22,208	3
2024	146,859		2,744	11,342	—
2025	139,387			6,380	—

=== Mercury Mariner ===
Year	U.S.
2004	7,171
2005	34,099
2006	33,941
2007	34,844
2008	32,306
2009	28,688
2010	29,912
