= Batavia Transmission =

Coordinates: 39°04′16″N 84°06′59″W

Batavia Transmission was a transmission factory owned by Ford Motor Company in Batavia, Ohio. The plant opened on July 24, 1980, and closed in September 2008. The plant produced front-wheel drive transmissions for Ford, Mercury, and Mazda

== ATX transmission ==
The original transmission produced was the ATX and was utilized in the Ford Taurus, Mercury Sable, Ford EXP, Mercury Lynx, Ford Escort, Mercury LN7, Ford Tempo, and Mercury Topaz. The ATX was manufactured through 1994 in the Tempo and Topaz.

== CD4E transmission ==
Production of the CD4E transmission started in 1992 and continued through the closing of the plant in 2008. The CD4E was used in the European Ford Mondeo, Ford Escape, Ford Probe, Ford Contour, Mercury Cougar, Mercury Mystique, Mercury Mariner, Mazda 626, Mazda Tribute, and Mazda MX-6.

== Partnership ==
In 1999, Ford partnered with ZF Friedrichshafen AG at the Batavia plant to continue production of the CD4E and to design and assemble new CVT transmissions. The joint-partnership was named ZF Batavia, with ZF Friedrichshafen AG holding a 51% majority in the agreement. CVT production began in late 2003. In 2005, Ford re-purchased 100% ownership of the Batavia location and renamed it Batavia Transmissions LLC. As Batavia Transmissions LLC, the plant produced the CFT23 and CFT30 CVT Transmissions from 2005 to 2007. The CFT23 was used in the Ford Focus and the CFT30 was used in the 2005-2007 models of the Ford Freestyle, Ford Five Hundred, and Mercury Montego.

== Closing ==
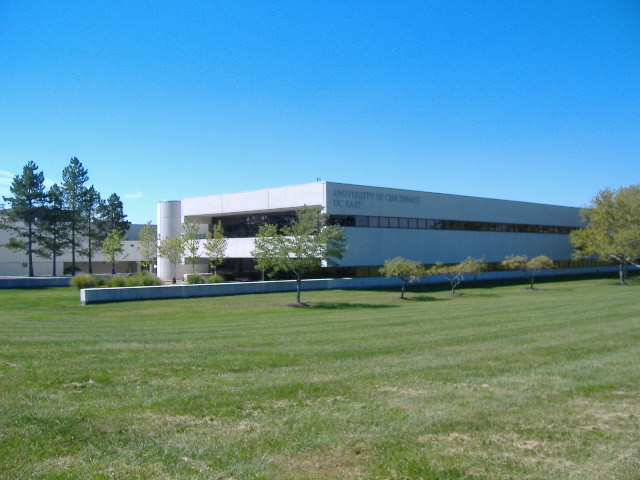
UC East

The plant assembled the final CD4E Transmission on Friday, June 20, 2008. Production of service parts continued at the plant through the middle of September 2008. The closing was part of Ford's "The Way Forward" plan, with some workers transferring to Ford's Sharonville Transmission Plant.

In July 2009, Industrial Asset Recycling LLC (IAR), Shelby Township, Michigan, which specializes in areas of Asset Recycling and Environmental Remediation, contracted with Ford Motor Company to Refurbish and prepare the facility for future tenants.

The next year, University of Cincinnati Clermont College opened a satellite campus, called UC East, in the administrative offices of the former plant.

The building is now also partially owned by Huhtamäki.

GE Aviation - On Wing Support has a tooling warehouse and machine shop as well.

== See also ==
- List of Ford factories
