= List of Ford transmissions =

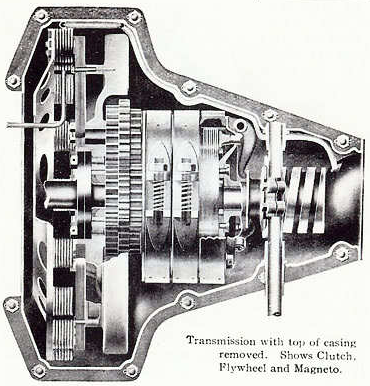
1909 Ford Model T transmission with top of casing removed. Engine flywheel, with its integrated magneto, is on the left, the gear clutches are in the center, and the driveshaft is on the right side.

The Ford Motor Company is an American car manufacturing company. It manufactures its own automobile transmissions and only purchases from suppliers in individual cases. They may be used in passenger cars and SUVs, or light commercial vehicles such as vans and light trucks.

Basically there are two types of motor vehicle transmissions:

- Manual – the driver has to perform each gear change using a manually operated clutch
- Automatic – once placed in drive (or any other 'automatic' selector position), it automatically selects the gear ratio dependent on engine speed and load

Basically there are two types of engine installation:

- In the longitudinal direction, the gearbox is usually designed separately from the final drive (including the differential). The transaxle configuration combines the gearbox and final drive in one housing and is only built in individual cases
- In the transverse direction, the gearbox and final drive are very often combined in one housing due to the much more restricted space available

Every type of transmission occurs in every type of installation.

== Automatic ==
- 1950–1965 Ford-O-Matic
- 1958–1979 Cruise-O-Matic
  - MX/FX
  - 1968–1981 FMX—A hybrid of the FX and MX
  - 1964–1981 C4
    - Most small block V8 powered cars of the 1960s and 1970s in the North American market
  - 1966–1996 C6
    - Most big-block V8 powered cars/trucks of the 1960s and 1970s in the North American market, All Fseries trucks without O/D, 80 thru 96 (97 For F250HD, F350, and F-Superduty models)
  - 1974–1989 C3—Light-duty, smaller than the C4
  - 1982–1986 C5—Improved C4, with a lock-up converter
  - 1985–1994 A4LD—C3 with overdrive
  - 1989–1998 E4OD—C6 with overdrive
  - 1999–2004 4R100—Replaces the E4OD transmission
  - 1995–2001 4R44E—Electronically controlled A4LD, light-duty
  - 1995–1997 4R55E—Electronically controlled A4LD, heavy-duty
- 1997–Current 5R44/5R55 Series—5-speed 5R44E/5R55E/N/S/W based on the 4R44E/4R55E, Bordeaux Automatic Transmission Plant / Sharonville Ohio transmission plant
  - Lincoln LS and Ford Thunderbird
  - Ford Falcon (Australia)
  - 2005–2010 Ford Mustang V6, GT
- 1980–1993 AOD—Ford's first 4-speed automatic transmission, based on the FMX but with a torque-splitting feature.
  - 1992– AOD-E—Electronic AOD
    - 1993–2008 4R70W—Strengthened AOD-E with lower 1st and 2nd gear ratios
      - Application vary by year
        - Ford F-Series
        - Ford Crown Victoria
        - Mercury Grand Marquis
        - Lincoln Town Car
        - Ford Mustang
        - Ford Expedition
        - Ford E-Series
        - Mercury Marauder (2003)
    - 2004–2014 4R75E & 4R75W
      - Applications vary by year
        - 4.2L, 4.6L, & 5.4L (2v & 3v)
          - F150
          - Ford E-Series Van
          - Ford Expedition
        - Ford Panther platform
        - Ford Crown Victoria
        - Mercury Grand Marquis
        - Lincoln Town Car
        - Ford Mustang (GT and Mach 1)
        - Mercury Marauder (2004)
        - Ford Police Interceptor
- AXOD family—Van Dyke Transmission
  - 1986–1991 AXOD—4-speed transaxle
    - Ford Taurus, Lincoln Continental, Mercury Sable
  - 1991–1993 AXOD-E—4-speed electronic transaxle
    - Ford Taurus, Lincoln Continental, Mercury Sable
  - 1994–2003 AX4S—4-speed electronic transaxle
    - Ford Taurus, Ford Windstar, Lincoln Continental, Mercury Sable
  - 1995–2007 AX4N/4F50N—4-speed electronic transaxle
    - Ford Freestar, Ford Taurus, Ford Windstar, Lincoln Continental, Mercury Monterey, Mercury Sable
- 1980–1994 FLC—3-speed hydraulic transaxle
  - Ford Escort, Ford Tempo, Mercury Topaz, Ford Taurus, Mercury Sable, and Ford EXP
- 1989–1997 4EAT-G—4-speed Mazda design transaxle
  - Ford Probe
- 1990–2003 F-4EAT—4-speed electronic transaxle—Mazda transaxle
  - Ford Escort, Mercury Tracer
- 2000-2013 4F27E—Strengthened 4-speed F-4EAT
  - Ford Focus, Ford Transit Connect
- 1994–2007 CD4E—4-speed transaxle, Batavia Transmission—Replaces the 4EAT-G transaxle
  - Ford Contour, Ford Escape, Ford Mondeo, Ford Probe, Mercury Cougar, Mercury Mariner, Mercury Mystique, Mazda Tribute, Mazda 626.
- 2003–2010 5R110W – 5-speed automatic with Tow/Haul mode – Replaces 4R100 in Super Duty trucks
  - Ford Super Duty
- 2011–present 6R 140 - 6-speed longitudinal automatic with Tow/Haul mode - Replaces 5R110W in Super Duty trucks.
  - Ford Super Duty
- 2005–present Aisin AWF-21 6-speed
  - Lincoln MKZ (2006–2010), Ford Fusion AWD (2007–2009), Land Rover LR2
- 2005–2007 ZF-Batavia CFT30—Continuously variable transaxle (CVT)
  - Ford Freestyle, Ford Five Hundred, Mercury Montego
- 2005–2016 6R 60 ZF longitudinal 6-speed transmission
  - Ford Falcon (BF, FG)
  - Ford Territory (AWD)
- 2006-2009 Ford FNR5 transmission - A 5 speed automatic from Mazda, uses Ford FNR5 fluid
  - Ford Fusion, Mercury Milan
- 2006–2007 6R 60 longitudinal 6-speed transmission
  - Ford Explorer, Mercury Mountaineer
- 2007–present 6R 80 longitudinal 6-speed transmission
  - Ford Expedition, Lincoln Navigator, Ford F-Series, 2011 Ford Mustang (V6 & GT), 2011 Ford Territory, 2011 Ford Ranger (Note: Global excluding USA)
- 2007–present 6F50—6-speed transaxle, Van Dyke Transmission
  - Ford Edge, Ford Explorer, Lincoln MKX, Lincoln MKS, Ford Taurus, Ford Flex, Lincoln MKT, Lincoln MKZ (2010–Present)
- 2009–present 6F35—6-speed transaxle, Van Dyke Transmission
  - Ford Escape, Ford Fusion, Ford Focus, Ford C-Max, Ford Kuga (in the Focus, C-Max and Kuga it is used with the 1.5 L4 Ecoboost. Also used in the Ford Escape in 2.0 L4 GTDI variant, and rated for vehicles up to 3.0L)
- 2009–present 6F55—6-speed transaxle (designed for use with the 3.5L Ecoboost V6)
  - Lincoln MKS, Ford Flex, Ford Taurus SHO, Lincoln MKT, Ford Explorer Sport (2013–present), Ford Police Interceptor Utility
- 2013–present HF35 Hybrid and Plug in Hybrid transaxle.
  - Ford Fusion HEV, Ford Fusion Energi PHEV, Ford C-Max HEV, Ford C-Max Energi PHEV, Lincoln MKZ Hybrid.
- 2017–2022 6R 100, based on the 6R 80 but more robust
  - Ford F250 super duty trucks with 6.2 L V8 only
- 2017–present 10R 80 10-speed longitudinal transmission
  - Ford F-150 (including Ford Raptor), Ford Expedition, Ford Mustang, Ford Ranger (T6) (2019–present)
- 2017–present 6F15—6-speed transaxle (designed for use with the 1.0 EcoBoost to replace the DPS6 Powershift transmission)
  - Ford EcoSport, Ford Focus, Ford C-Max
- 2017–present 8F35 8-speed transverse transmission (1.5 EcoBlue, 2.0 Duratorq, 2.0 EcoBoost)
  - Ford Edge, Ford Escape (2020), Ford Focus, Ford Maverick (2.0 EcoBoost)(the Maverick Lobo AWD uses a Quick Shift 7-speed variant that is programmed to skip second gear), Ford S-MAX, Ford Taurus
- 2017–present 8F40 8-speed transverse transmission (2.0 EcoBlue)
  - Ford Edge, Ford Focus, Ford S-MAX, Ford Galaxy, Ford Mondeo, Ford Kuga
- 2018–present 8F24 8-speed transverse transmission (1.0 and 1.5 EcoBoost)
  - Ford Focus
- 2018–present 8F57 8-speed transverse transmission for higher torque (2.7 V6 EcoBoost)
  - Ford Edge ST, Ford Explorer, Ford Fusion, Ford Taurus
- 2020–present 8F SelectShift® 8-speed transverse transmission (2.0 and 2.3 EcoBoost)
  - Lincoln Corsair,
  - Lincoln Zephyr (China)
- 2020–present 10R 60 longitudinal 10-speed transmission
  - Ford Explorer, Ford Police Interceptor Utility (3.3L V6), Ford Bronco (2021–present), Ford Ranger (2024–present)
- 2020–present 10R 140 - 10-speed longitudinal automatic with Tow/Haul Mode - Replaces the 6R 140 in Super Duty trucks.
  - Ford Super Duty
- 2021–present HF45 Hybrid and Plug in Hybrid transaxle.
  - Ford Escape/Kuga FHEV / PHEV, Ford Maverick HEV MY22-24, Ford Mondeo (fifth generation), Lincoln Corsair.
- 2023–present HF55 Hybrid transaxle.
  - Ford Edge L, Ford Mondeo Sport, Lincoln Z, Lincoln Nautilus second Gen, Ford Maverick HEV MY25 onwards.

== Dual-clutch automatics ==
These are dual-clutch transmissions.

- 2008–present 6DCT 150 6-speed wet clutch
  - Ford Fiesta
- 2008–present 6DCT 250 (DPS6) 6-speed dry clutch
  - Ford EcoSport, Ford Fiesta, Ford Focus.
  - The 2012-2016 DPS6 Powershift transmission was used in the 2012–2016 Ford Focus and 2011–2016 Ford Fiesta sedans. This transmission is the subject of a massive number of lawsuits alleging Ford lied in order to sell cars Ford knew had defective transmissions.
- 2008–present 6DCT450 Ford Powershift (MPS6) 6-speed wet clutch
  - Ford Focus, Ford Mondeo, Ford Kuga, Ford Galaxy, Ford Fiesta, Ford C-Max, Ford S-Max
- Getrag Transmissions
  - 2020 7DCT300
    - Ford Puma
    - Ford Fiesta
  - 2017–present 7DCL750 Getrag - 7-speed
    - Ford GT (2nd gen. V6)
- Tremec Transmissions
  - 2020–present Tremec TR-9070 7-speed
    - Shelby GT500

== Manual ==
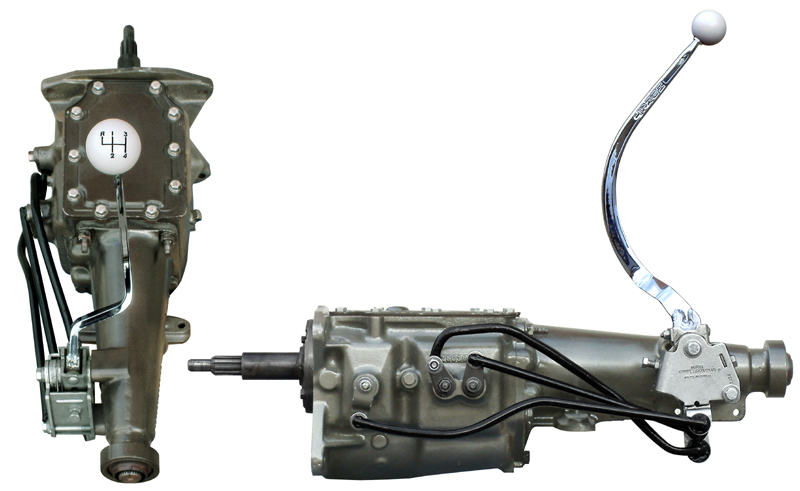
- Ford designed 3-speed manual transmission with overdrive, more familiarly referred to as a "Toploader", with typical external gear shifter.
  1960-1967 Ford/Mercury HED 3-speed transmission (non-syncro first gear)
- 1968- Ford Type E (aka Built or 2000e) 4-speed transmission Came in Anglia 105E, Cortina MkI, Lotus Cortina MkI, Cortina MkII to up to '68, Consul Classic, Consul Capri, Corsair, Escort TC, Mexico Mk1 and RS1600 MkI.
- 1976–1985 BC or BC4
- 1982–1995 BC5
- 1995–present IB5
- MT75
  - Ford Sierra, Ford Granada, Ford Escort Cosworth, Ford Scorpio, Ford Transit
- 1981–1994 MTX-III
- 1989–1995 MTX-IV
- MTX-75, "Cologne" transmission
  - Ford Contour, Ford Escort, Ford Focus, Ford Mondeo, Jaguar X-Type, Mercury Cougar
- Toploader
  - RUG SROD (Single Rail Over drive) 3-Speed+OD 83-86 F-150 78-84 Fairmont/Granada (SBF only)
- Type 9 (or Type N, T-9)
  - Ford Capri 1.6, 2.0 1983 onwards, Capri 2.8 1982 onwards, Ford Sierra 1.6, 1.8, 2.0, Sierra XR4i, Sierra XR4x4 2.8, Merkur XR4Ti
  - New Process 435 heavy duty 4 speed transmission
  - Clark / Tremec 4 speed OD and SROD
- Tremec or Borg-Warner transmissions
  - Borg-Warner T-18/T-19 transmissions - circa 1966–1991 Ford F-Series
  - Borg-Warner T-10 transmission – 1957–1965
  - Borg-Warner T-5 transmission – Ford Sierra; 1983–1995 Ford Mustang; 2005–2009 Mustang V6
  - Tremec T-170/T-175/T176/T177 1984-1990+? F-series
  - Tremec T-45 transmission – 1996–1999 Mustang Cobra, 1996–2000 Mustang GT
  - Tremec T-56 transmission – 2000 Cobra R and 2003–2004 Mustang Cobra, Ford Falcon (BF) I6T and 5.4l V8 BF MK1 - BF MK11
  - Tremec TR-3160 transmission – Mustang GT350, Mustang Mach 1, 2024– Mustang Dark Horse
  - Tremec TR-3650 transmission – 2001–2010 Mustang GT; 2003–2004 Mustang Mach 1
  - Tremec TR-6060 transmission – 2007–2014 Ford Shelby GT500, Ford Falcon (FG) I6T, 5.4L and 5.0L supercharged V8
- Getrag transmissions
  - Getrag MT-285 6-Speed Manual - 2002-2004 Focus SVT
  - Getrag MT-82 - 2011–present Mustang GT
  - Getrag MMT6 - 2013–2018 Focus ST, 2003-2012 Focus ST220 (non-US), 2017–2018 Focus RS, Volvo C30, C70, S40, S60, S80, V50, V60, V70, Ford Transit (front-wheel drive, non-US), Ford Mondeo, Ford S-Max
  - Getrag iB6 - Ford Fiesta, Ford Fusion with 1.6L EcoBoost, Ford Focus with 1.0L EcoBoost, and numerous non-US market models including S-Max, Mondeo, Focus ST (petrol and diesel),
  - Getrag MT1550 - 2021–present Bronco (2.3L only)
  - Getrag 221 - 2000-2002 Lincoln LS (3.0L V6 only)
- Mazda M5OD transmissions
  - M5OD-R1 – Ford Ranger, Bronco II, Explorer, Aerostar.
  - M5OD-R1HD – Ford Ranger (4.0L V6 only)
  - M5OD-R2 – Thunderbird Super Coupe, Ford F-150, Bronco (except with 351 cu in (5.8 L) V8)
- Toyo Kogyo (Early Mazda)
  - TK 4 4 speed manual (No Overdrive) (Ranger, Bronco II 83-85, Aerostar 85)
  - TK 5 5 speed manual (With overdrive) (Ranger, Bronco II 85-87, Aerostar 85-87)
- Mitsubishi FM145/FM146 5 speed (overdrive) (Ranger/Bronco II 86-92 with 2.0L, 2.3L, and 2.9L engines only)
- ZF Transmissions
  - S5-42- Late 80’s and early 90’s F-250+
  - S5-47- Mid 90’s to 2000 F-250+
  - ZF 5 DS-25-2- Pantera, GT40
  - S6-650- 2000-2003 F250+
  - S6-750- 2003-2006 F250+
