= Ford CD4E transmission =

C4DE

Overview
- Manufacturer: Ford Motor Company
- Also called: LA4A-EL (Mazda vehicles)
- Production: 1994–2007

Body and chassis
- Class: 4-speed transverse automatic transaxle

Chronology
- Predecessor: 4EAT-G
- Successor: 6F

The CD4E is a 4-speed automatic transaxle for front-wheel-drive cars from 1994 to 2007. It was manufactured at Ford's Batavia Transmission plant starting in 1994. The CD4E was called the LA4A-EL by Mazda and is also known as the 4F44E internally to Ford.

Applications:

- 1994–2002 Mazda 626 4-cylinder
- 1994–1997 Mazda MX-6 4-cylinder
- 1994–1997 Ford Probe 4-cylinder
- 1995–2000 Ford Contour
- 1995–2000 Mercury Mystique
- 1995–2007 Ford Mondeo (up to Mondeo III 4-cylinder model)
- 1999–2002 Mercury Cougar
- 2001–2008 Ford Escape
- 2001–2008 Mazda Tribute
- 2005–2008 Mercury Mariner

== See also ==
- List of Ford transmissions
