= Ford 4F27E transmission =

4F27E

Overview
- Manufacturer: Ford; Mazda
- Also called: FN4A-EL
- Production: 2000–2013

Body and chassis
- Class: 4-speed transverse automatic transaxle

Chronology
- Predecessor: F-4EAT; F3A; ATX
- Successor: Ford FNR5/Mazda FS5A-EL

The 4F27E is an electronically controlled 4-speed automatic transaxle transmission developed by Mazda and Ford. Mazda's name for this transmission is FN4A-EL, Ford's name for this transmission is 4F27E. Mazda's FS5A-EL (Ford FNR5) is the 5-speed successor to this transmission which shares many of the same parts.

The 4F27E is a strengthened 4-speed F-4EAT automatic and only some of the internals were updated. It now has a four-element torque converter that includes a torque converter clutch and geartrain with two planetary gearsets, a transfer-shaft gear final drive, and a larger differential. The hydraulic control system of the 4F27E has six electronically controlled solenoids for shift feel (through line pressure control), shift scheduling (through shift valve position control) and TCC (torque converter clutch) apply, controlled by pulse-width modulation (PWM).

On Mazda vehicles, this transmission uses Mazda M5 fluid (Mazda part number: 0000-77-112E-01), which is NOT Mercon V or Mercon LV according to Mazda Technical Service Bulletin 0500116. This fluid is made by Idemitsu Kosan (according to the label on the back of the Mazda bottle). Idemitsu sells the equivalent Type-M fluid in the aftermarket. The equivalent Ford fluid is FNR5 (Ford part number: XT-9-QMM5). Moreover, Mazda vehicles have "M V" written on the dipstick handle.

On the other hand, Ford cars used Mercon V (Ford part number: XT-5-QMC) until 2007 MY. After 2007 Ford made some hardware and calibration modifications so that from 2008 MY it is required to use Mercon LV oil (Ford part number: XT-10-QLVC). Later Ford authorized back servicing transmissions from 2000 to 2007 with Mercon LV.

Differences between Ford Mercon ATF and Mazda type M5 ATF:

- Mazda type M5 ATF is not the same fluid as Ford Mercon V or Ford Mercon LV.
- Mazda type M5 ATF has a greater viscosity than Ford Mercon V and Ford Mercon LV in low temperatures.
- Mazda type M5 ATF has a greater anti-judder specification than Ford Mercon V and Ford Mercon LV.

Consequently, carefully refer to the service manual for correct transmission maintenance as Ford and Mazda made their own calibration modification on the transmission so mixing different oils or servicing transmission with the wrong fluid will result in premature wear and transmission damage.

Mazda includes a drain plug, while Ford does not. For the Ford vehicles without the drain plug, a Mazda transmission pan can be installed on a Ford 4F27E, and it will fit perfectly. Aftermarket transmission pans are also available.

Transmission dry fill capacity: 6.7 Liters / 7 Quarts.

Gear ratios:

1	2	3	4	R
2.81:1	1.50:1	1.00:1	0.73:1	2.65:1

Transmission name description:

4	F	27	E
4 speed	Front wheel drive	Maximum input torque after torque converter: 270 Lb-ft (365 N-m)	fully Electronic control

Applications:

- Ford Fiesta MK6 (2009–2012) 1.4L & 1.5L Duratec engine (Ti-VCT)
- Ford EcoSport with 2.0L Duratec engine
- Ford Focus 2000–2011
- Ford Transit Connect with 2.0L Duratec engine 2010–2013
- Mazda2
- Mazda3
- Mazda5
- Mazda6
- Mazda CX-7
- Mazda Verisa

== See also ==
- List of Ford transmissions
- List of Mazda transmissions
