= Ford F-4EAT transmission =

F-4EAT
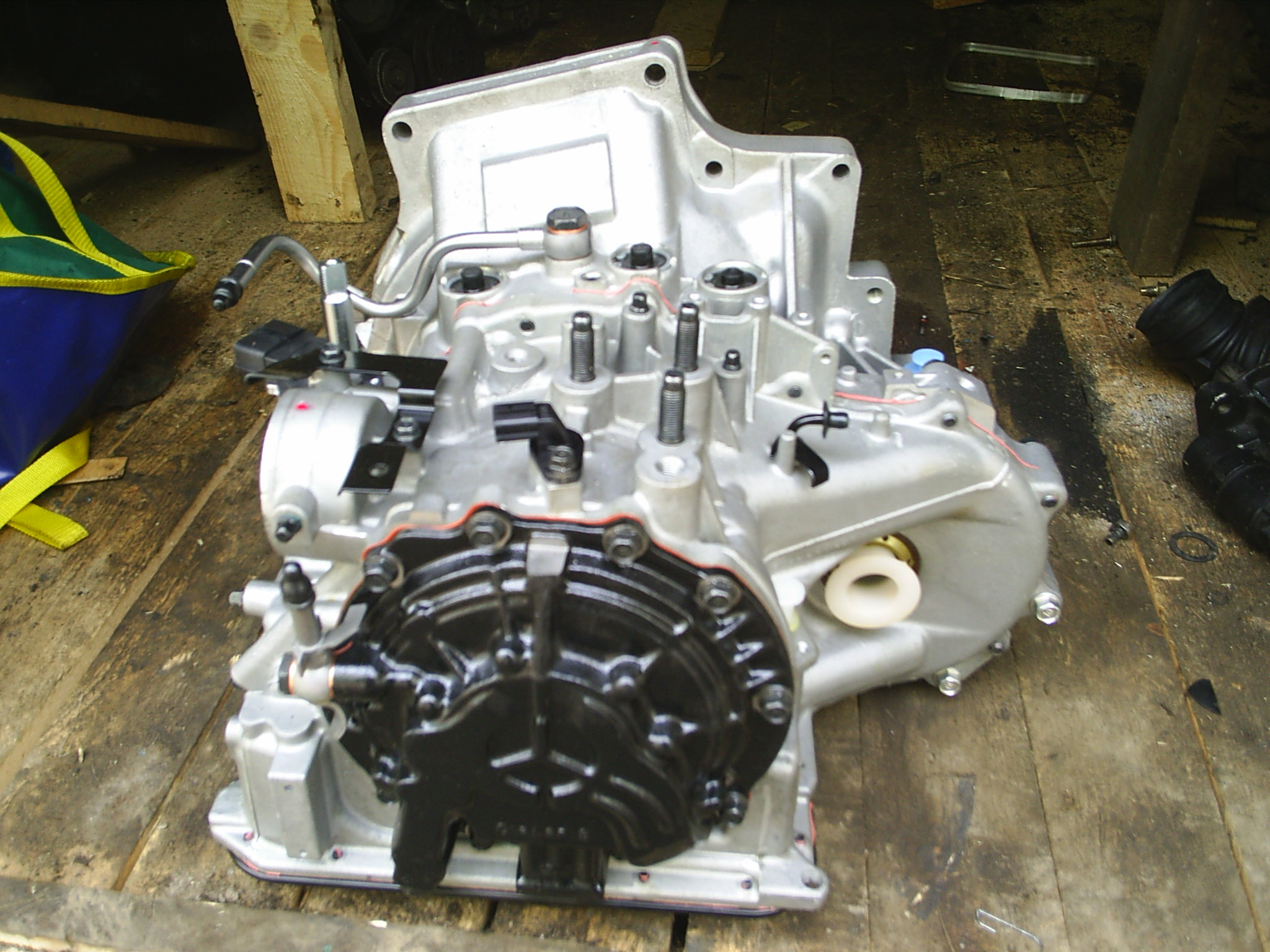

Overview
- Manufacturer: Ford; Mazda; Kia
- Production: 1990–2005

Body and chassis
- Class: 4-speed transverse automatic transaxle

Chronology
- Predecessor: ATX
- Successor: 4F27E

The F-4EAT was a 4-speed, electronically controlled automatic transmission developed by Mazda and JATCO beginning in 1990. It was also later produced by Ford Motor Company from 1991 to 2003, to replace the 3-speed/hydraulic controlled ATX. It is referred to as the "F4A-EL" or "G4A-EL" by both Mazda and Kia, who also used this transmission. This transmission is an updated Mazda F3A transmission, 3-speed hydraulic controlled transmission. The F-4EAT uses electronic, computer controls, a 4th gear overdrive, has a lock-up torque converter and differential. It used a computer-controlled speed sensor for the speedometer.

Gear ratios
1	2	3	4	R
2.80:1	1.54:1	1.00:1	0.70:1	2.33:1

== Applications ==
=== Ford ===
- 1991–1996 Ford Laser (EU AUS & NZ)
- 1991–2002 Ford Escort
- 1998–2003 Ford ZX2
- 1993–1997 Ford Probe
- 1991–1999 Mercury Tracer
- 1991–1994 Mercury Capri

=== Mazda ===
- 1990–2003 Mazda Protege
- 1993 Mazda 626 LX V6/ES V6
- 1990–1994 Mazda 323
- 1992–1995 Mazda MX-3
- 1995–2001 Mazda Millenia (non-Miller cycle engine)
- 1999–2001 Mazda MPV 2.5 Duratec (non-3.0 Duratec)
- 2007–2012 Ford Escape (ZC, ZD series, 2.3 L Duratec)
- also known to be used in Mazda Xedos 6 and Mazda Xedos 9

=== Kia ===
- 1994–2001 Kia Sephia
- 2000–2003 Kia Spectra
- 2000–2005 Kia Rio

== See also ==
- List of Ford transmissions
- List of Mazda transmissions
