= Mazda G4A-EL transmission =

The G4A-EL was a 4-speed automatic transmission from Mazda. It was Mazda's first four-speed transmission on its introduction in 1987.

The original 1987 G4A-EL included three shift solenoids, a lockup solenoid, a vane-type pump, and a throttle cable. It was redesigned for 1988 and used in the Ford Probe the next year under the 4EAT-G name by Ford.

Applications:

- 1987–1992 Mazda 626
- 1989–1992 Mazda MX-6
- 1989–1992 Ford Probe
- 1990–1991 Mazda 323 AWD

== G4A-HL ==
The G4A-HL was a governor controlled lighter-duty version produced in 1988 and 1989.

Applications:

- 1988–1989 Mazda 323

Mazda 323 for year 1989 File:1988_Mazda_323_(BF_Series_2)_Super_Deluxe_sedan_(2015-06-18).jpg

== GF4A-EL ==
The transmission was reworked again for 1993 as the GF4A-EL with seven solenoids, a rotor-type pump, and the removal of the throttle cable, GF4A-EL It is referred to as the F-4EAT by Ford Motor Company

 In 1994, all US-built 4-cylinder 626s and MX-6s began using the locally sourced ZF/Ford designed CD4E transmission, which Mazda given the code LA4A-EL.

== Applications ==
Ford Motor Company

- 1991–1996 Ford Laser (EU AUS & NZ)
- 1991–2002 Ford Escort
- 1998–2003 Ford ZX2
- 1993–1997 Ford Probe
- 1991–1999 Mercury Tracer
- 1991–1994 Mercury Capri

Mazda

- 1990–2003 Mazda Protege
- 1993 Mazda 626 LX V6/ES V6
- 1990–1994 Mazda 323
- 1992–1995 Mazda MX-3
- 1995–2001 Mazda Millenia (non-Miller cycle engine)
- 1999–2001 Mazda MPV 2.5 Duratec (non-3.0 Duratec)
- 2007–2012 Ford Escape (ZC, ZD series, 2.3 L Duratec)
- also known to be used in Mazda Xedos 6 and Mazda Xedos 9

Kia

- 1994–2001 Kia Sephia
- 2000–2003 Kia Spectra
- 2000–2005 Kia Rio

== See also ==
- List of Mazda transmissions
- List of Ford transmissions
