= Mercury Tracer =

American car model

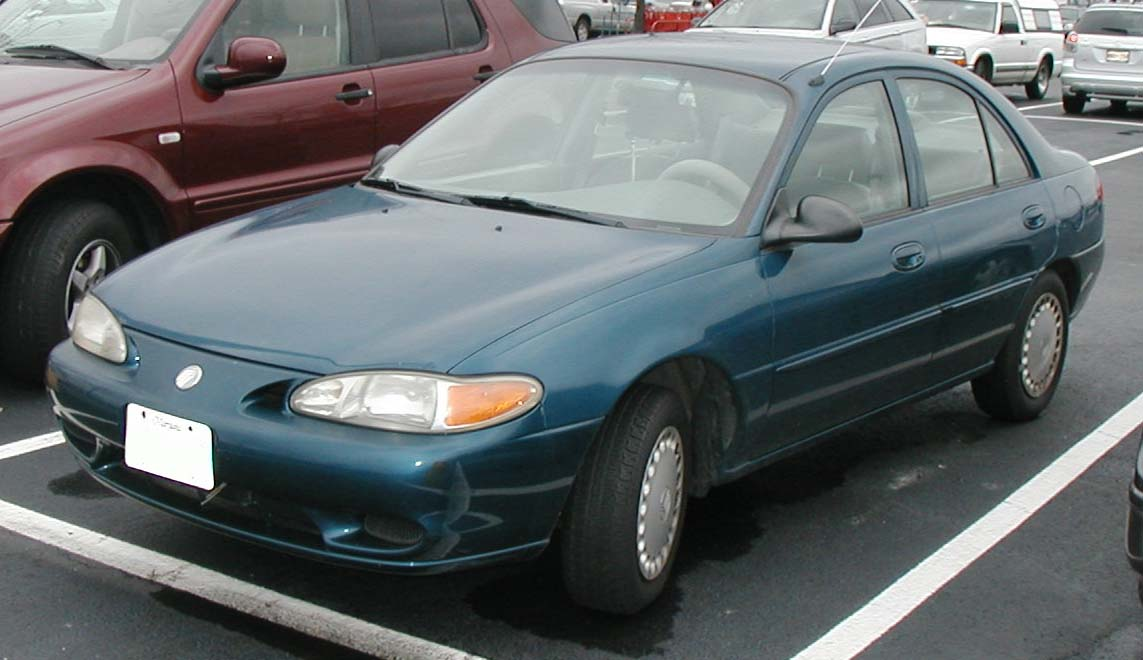
- Tracer sedan (third generation)

Overview
- Manufacturer: Ford Lio Ho (1986–1989); Ford de México SA (1987–1989); Mazda (1987–1989); Mercury (Ford) (1990–1999)
- Production: 1986–1989; 1990–1999
- Model years: 1987–1989; 1991–1999

Body and chassis
- Class: Subcompact car (1988–1989); Compact car (1991–1999)
- Layout: FF layout

Chronology
- Predecessor: Mercury Lynx

The Mercury Tracer is a compact car that was marketed by Mercury from the 1987 to 1999 model years. The replacement for the Mercury Lynx, the Tracer was also sold as a three-door and five-door hatchback and a five-door station wagon; a four-door sedan was introduced for the second generation. Three generations of the model line were produced, with the second two serving as the counterpart of the Ford Escort.

The first Mercury-brand vehicle since 1960 without a direct Ford counterpart in North America, the first-generation Tracer was developed by Mazda. For its entire production, the model line (including two generations of the Escort) was derived from the Mazda 323/Protegé.

Mercury discontinued the Tracer after the 1999 model year, as Ford began phasing out the Escort in favor of the Ford Focus for 2000. Without a Mercury counterpart to the Focus, the brand exited the compact car segment. A fourth-generation Tracer was initially planned for a 2012 release, but the project was abandoned following Mercury's closure in 2010.

== First generation (1987–1989) ==
First generation
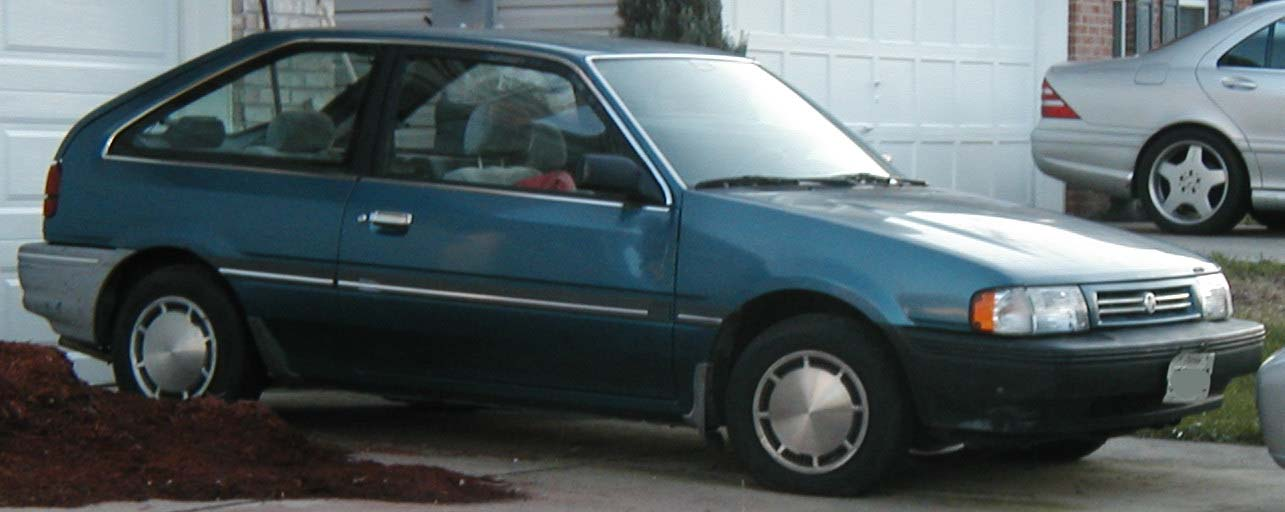

Overview
- Also called: Ford Laser (KC)
- Production: 1986–1989
- Model years: 1987–1989
- Assembly: Hermosillo, Mexico; Taoyuan City, Taiwan

Body and chassis
- Class: Subcompact
- Body style: 3-door hatchback 5-door hatchback 5-door station wagon
- Platform: Mazda BF platform
- Related: Mazda 323; Ford Laser

Powertrain
- Engine: 1.6 L Mazda B6 I4
- Transmission: 5-speed manual 3-speed Mazda F3A automatic

Dimensions
- Wheelbase: 94.7 in (2,410 mm)
- Length: Hatchback: 162.0 in (4,110 mm); Wagon: 169.7 in (4,310 mm)
- Width: 65.2 in (1,660 mm)
- Height: Hatchback: 53.0 in (1,350 mm); Wagon: 53.7 in (1,364 mm)

For 1987, Mercury introduced the Tracer to replace the Mercury Lynx as its subcompact model range. The first Mercury since its 1960 full-size range to not share any commonality with Ford in North America, the Tracer was derived from the Ford Laser (itself, a variant of the Mazda 323); sold in Asia-Pacific markets in place of the Ford Escort, the Laser had been redesigned in 1985. The first Tracers went on sale in Canada in early October 1986. In the United States, the model line went on sale in March 1987 and would be sold alongside the Lynx until the end of the model year.

The first Mercury assembled outside of North America, all Canadian examples of the Tracer (three-door and five-door hatchbacks) were sourced from Ford Lio Ho in Taiwan. Vehicles for the United States (three-door and five-door hatchbacks, along with the station wagon) were sourced from Hermosillo Stamping & Assembly in Mexico. The Tracer had nearly no United States parts content and as such did not count towards lowering Ford's Corporate Average Fuel Economy (CAFE).

The first-generation Tracer was sold through the 1989 model year, coinciding with the model cycle of its Laser counterpart. Mexican assembly ended in August 1989, with late examples sold as "89 1/2" models into calendar year 1990; in spite of the cancellation, Tracer sales in the United States actually picked up in model year 1989. In Canada, Tracer imports ended during 1989, with sales slowing to a trickle by the end of the year. 5,489 Tracers were sold in Canada in calendar year 1988, followed by 1,775 cars in 1989.

=== Chassis ===
The Mercury Tracer is an American counterpart of the Australian-market Ford Laser KE, also sold in Japan, Asia, and South Africa. While sharing a slightly different body, the Laser shared a common chassis with the front-wheel drive Mazda 323, designated the Mazda BF platform.

A 1.6-litre B6 inline-four from the 323 was offered with the Tracer. For Canadian-market examples, a 71-hp carbureted engine was offered, with an 84-hp fuel-injected engine offered in the United States. A 5-speed manual was standard, with a 3-speed automatic offered as an option.

=== Body ===
In line with its Lynx predecessor, the Tracer was offered as in 3-door and 5-door hatchback configurations. For the United States, a five-door station wagon was introduced for 1988.

The Tracer shared its exterior with the Ford Laser, distinguished by a Mercury grille, badging, and wheel covers. Along with the use of clear-lens front marker lights, slight revisions were made to the hatchback and station wagon liftgate (the station wagon, sharing nearly identical sheetmetal with the 323 wagon).

In line with the previous Lynx (along with the larger Topaz, Sable, and Grand Marquis), the Tracer offered GS and LS trims (in addition to a base L trim).

First-generation Mercury Tracer

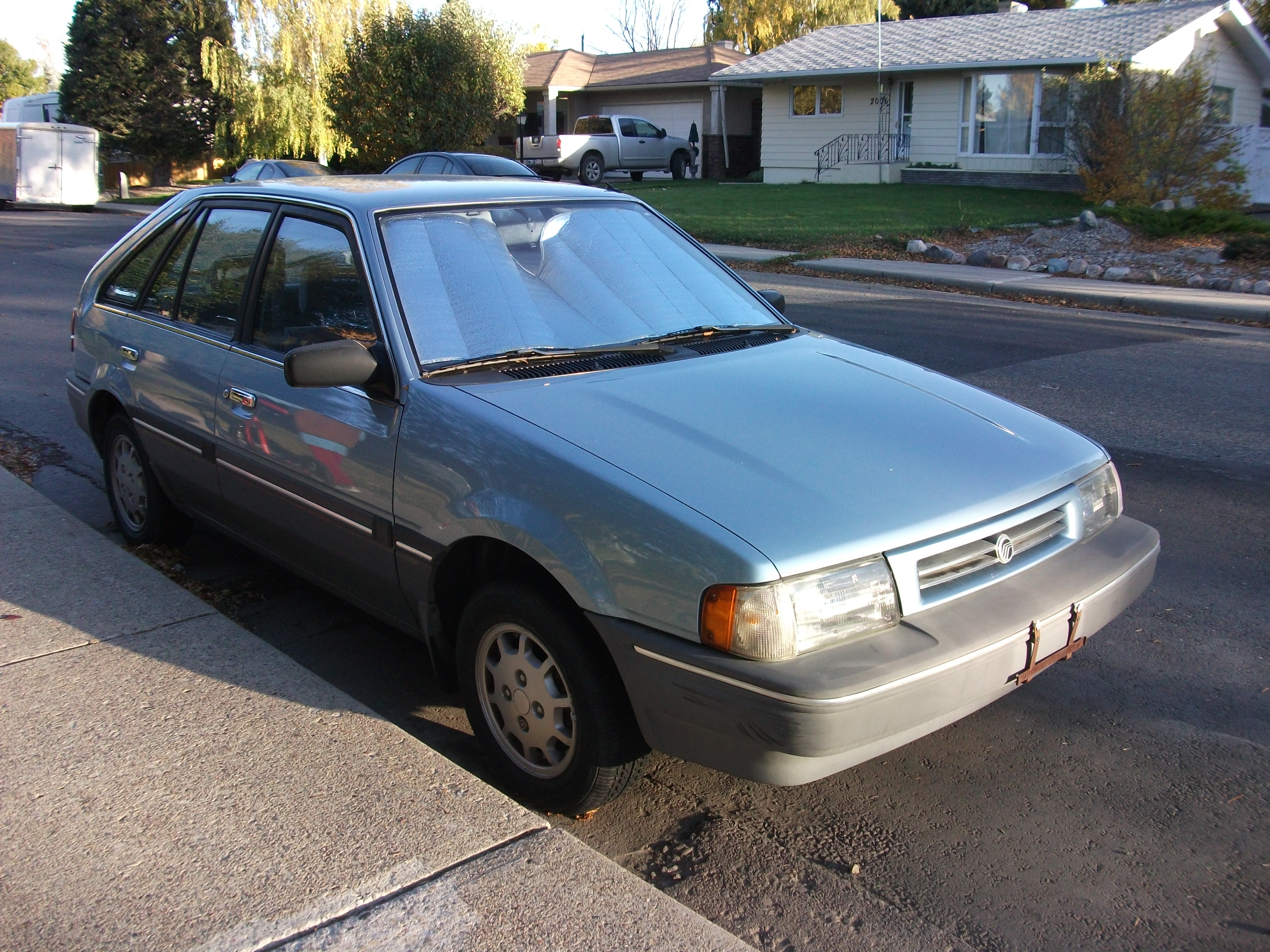
Mercury Tracer five-door

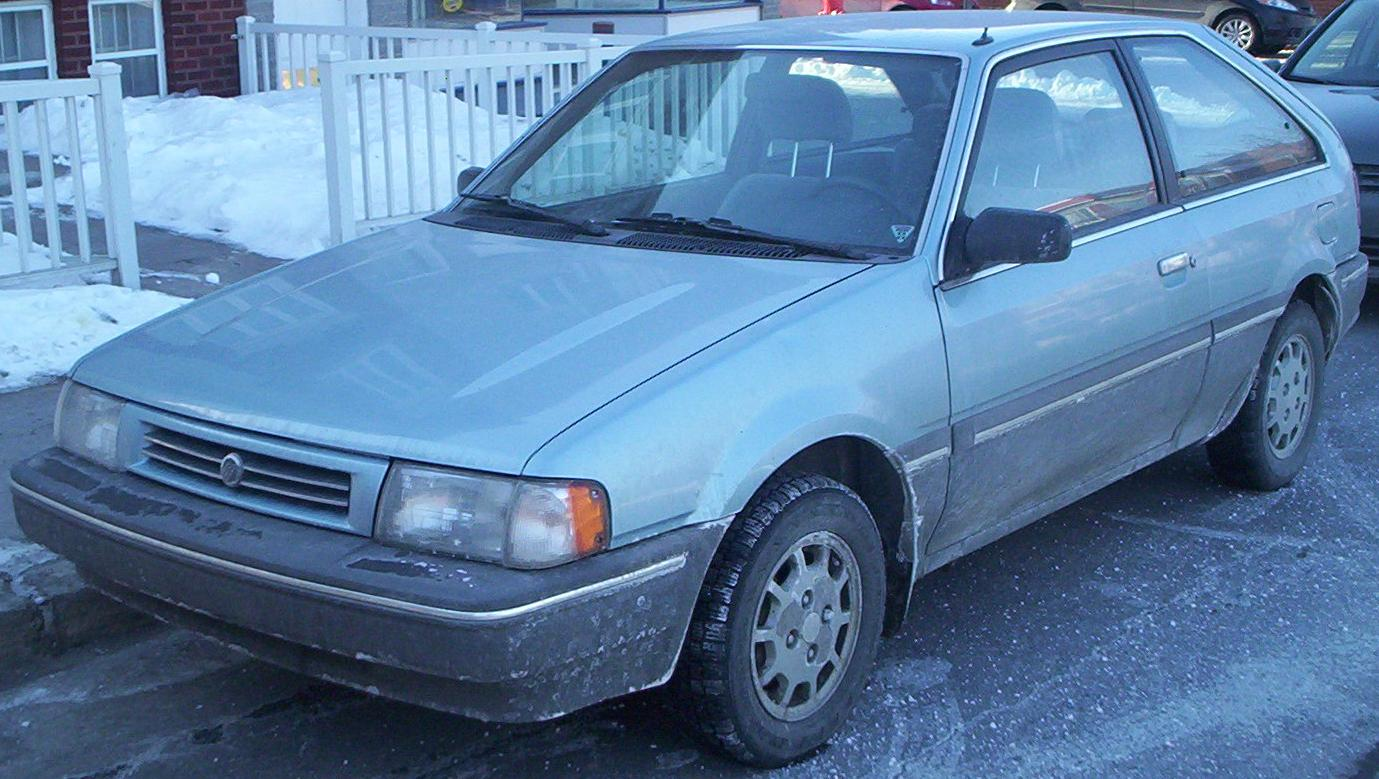
1988–1989 Mercury Tracer three-door

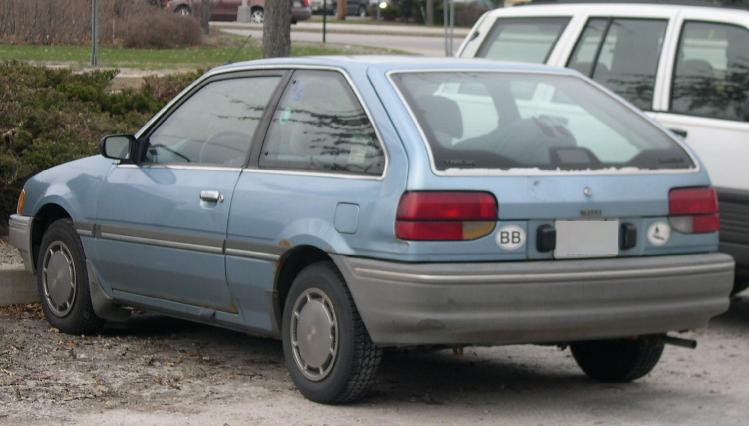
1987 Mercury Tracer hatchback

== Second generation (1991–1996) ==
Second generation
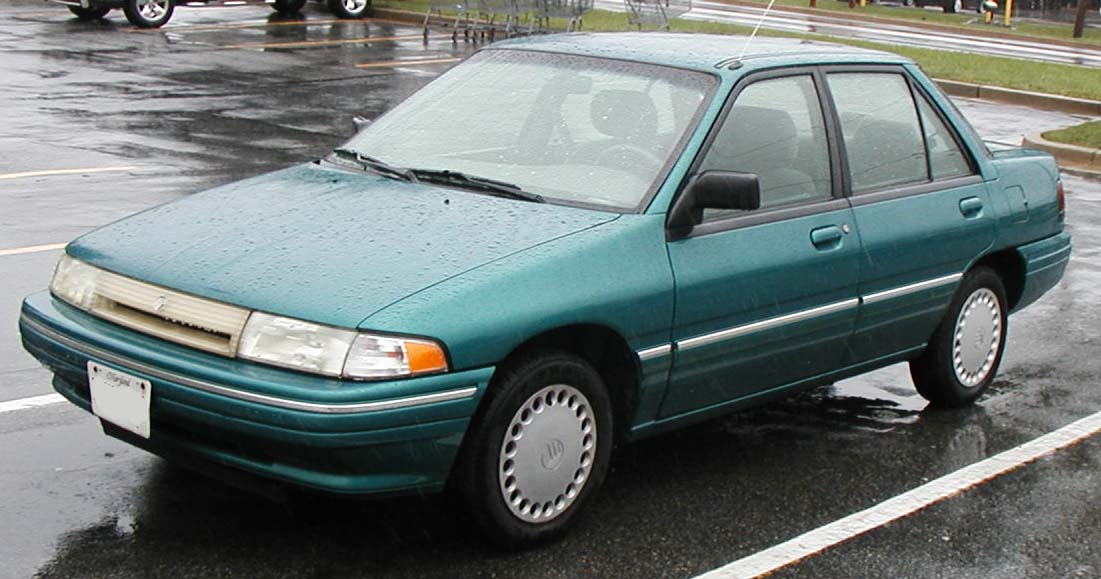
- 1993–1996 Mercury Tracer

Overview
- Production: 1990–1996
- Model years: 1991–1996
- Assembly: Wayne, Michigan, United States; Hermosillo, Mexico

Body and chassis
- Class: Compact
- Body style: 4-door sedan 5-door station wagon
- Related: Ford Escort; Mazda 323; Mazda Protegé; Ford Laser

Powertrain
- Engine: 1.9 L CVH I4; 1.8 L BP DOHC 16v I4
- Transmission: 5-speed M5 manual 4-speed F-4EAT automatic

Dimensions
- Wheelbase: 98.4 in (2500 mm)
- Length: Sedan: 170.9 in (4,341 mm); Wagon: 171.3 in (4,351 mm)
- Width: 66.7 in (1,690 mm)
- Height: Sedan: 52.7 in (1,339 mm); Wagon: 53.6 in (1,361 mm)
- Curb weight: 2498 lb (1133 kg)

After skipping the 1990 model year altogether, Lincoln-Mercury released the second-generation Mercury Tracer in early 1990 as an early 1991 model. In a major change, the American Ford Escort also adopted the design of the Ford Laser alongside the Tracer, with all three model lines now derived from the Mazda 323 and the renamed Mazda Protegé. The new generation grew in size, moving to the compact-car segment.

Again sold in the United States and Canada (the latter, from 1991 to 1993), all assembly of the model line was initially consolidated at Hermosillo Stamping, with Wayne Stamping & Assembly in Michigan added in 1991. North American parts content was considerably higher than for the preceding generation.

The Mercury Tracer LTS was named to Car and Driver magazine's Ten Best list for 1991.

=== Chassis ===
The second-generation Tracer is derived from the front-wheel drive Mazda BG platform (officially designated the Ford CT120 platform), sharing a 98.4-inch wheelbase with the Escort and Protegé.

An 88 hp (66 kW) 1.9-liter CVH inline-four is the standard engine (shared with the Escort). From 1991 to 1994, a 127-hp 1.8-liter Mazda BP inline-four (shared with the Ford Escort GT and Mazda Protegé LX) was offered. A 5-speed manual was standard with both engines, with a 4-speed automatic offered with the 1.9L engine.

=== Body ===
The second-generation Tracer was offered in two configurations: a four-door sedan and a five-door station wagon; though offered by Ford for the Escort, the two hatchbacks were discontinued for the Tracer (a station wagon was not offered by Mazda). Sharing almost no body panels with the Protegé (aside from visibly shared door stampings), the Tracer shared a large degree of commonality with the Laser and Escort, differing primarily in the design of its grille, clear-lens parking lamps, and full-width taillamps (in the style of the Cougar and Grand Marquis).

Throughout the second-generation Tracer's production run, only two trim levels were available: an unnamed base model sedan and wagon, and the LTS (Luxury Touring Sedan), which served as the flagship of the model range. Largely the counterpart of the Ford Escort LX-E (the four-door equivalent to the Ford Escort GT), the LTS was powered by a 127 hp (95 kW) Mazda 1.8-liter engine; the LTS was produced through the 1996 model year. For 1994, a "Trio" package became available on the base Tracer sedan and wagon. The Trio package featured a leather-wrapped steering wheel, 7-spoke aluminum wheels (Shared with the Ford Escort LX Sport) and a "Trio" decal on each fender; Tracer sedans with the Trio package also featured rear decklid spoilers. The package continued to be available through 1996.

During its production, the second-generation Tracer saw few external changes. For 1991, the base model Tracer sedan and wagon were styled with a body-color front grille, while the LTS featured a light-bar grille; the base model received the LTS's grille for 1993. For 1994, the Tracer was given a drivers' side airbag as a passive restraint; for 1995, the passenger airbag was added, requiring a redesign of the dashboard, however, the automatic seat belts retained through 1996.

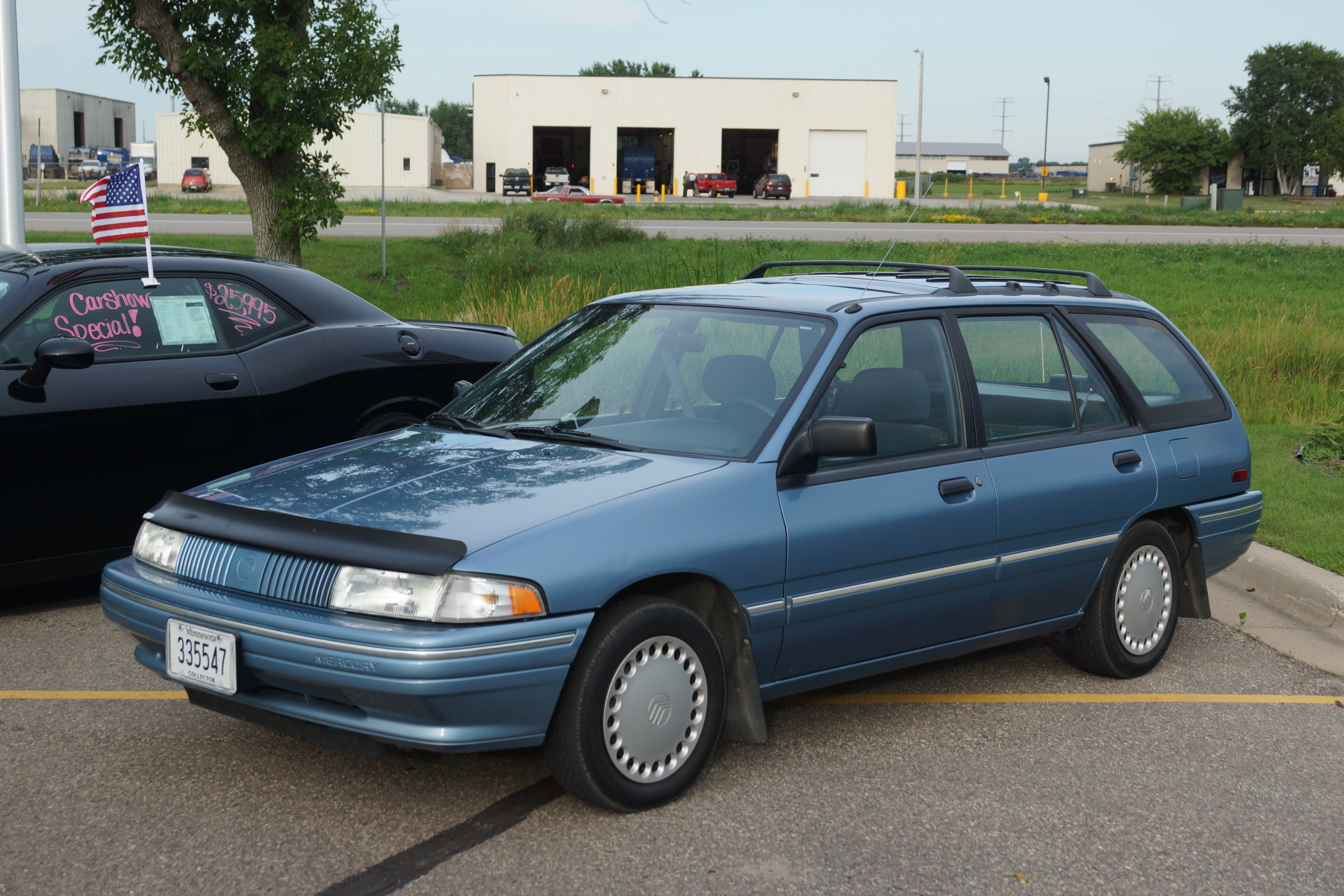
1991 Mercury Tracer wagon

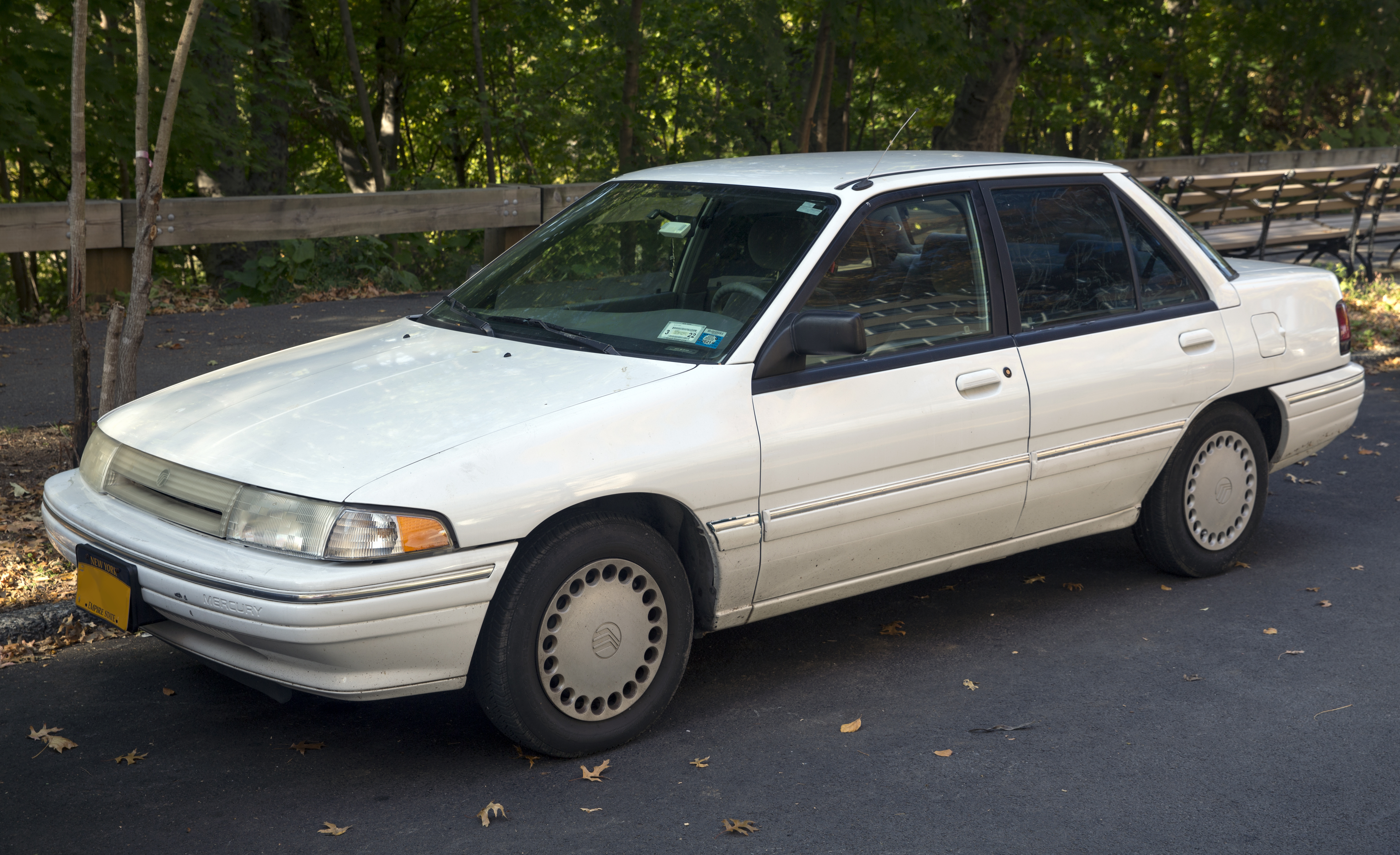
1995 Mercury Tracer sedan

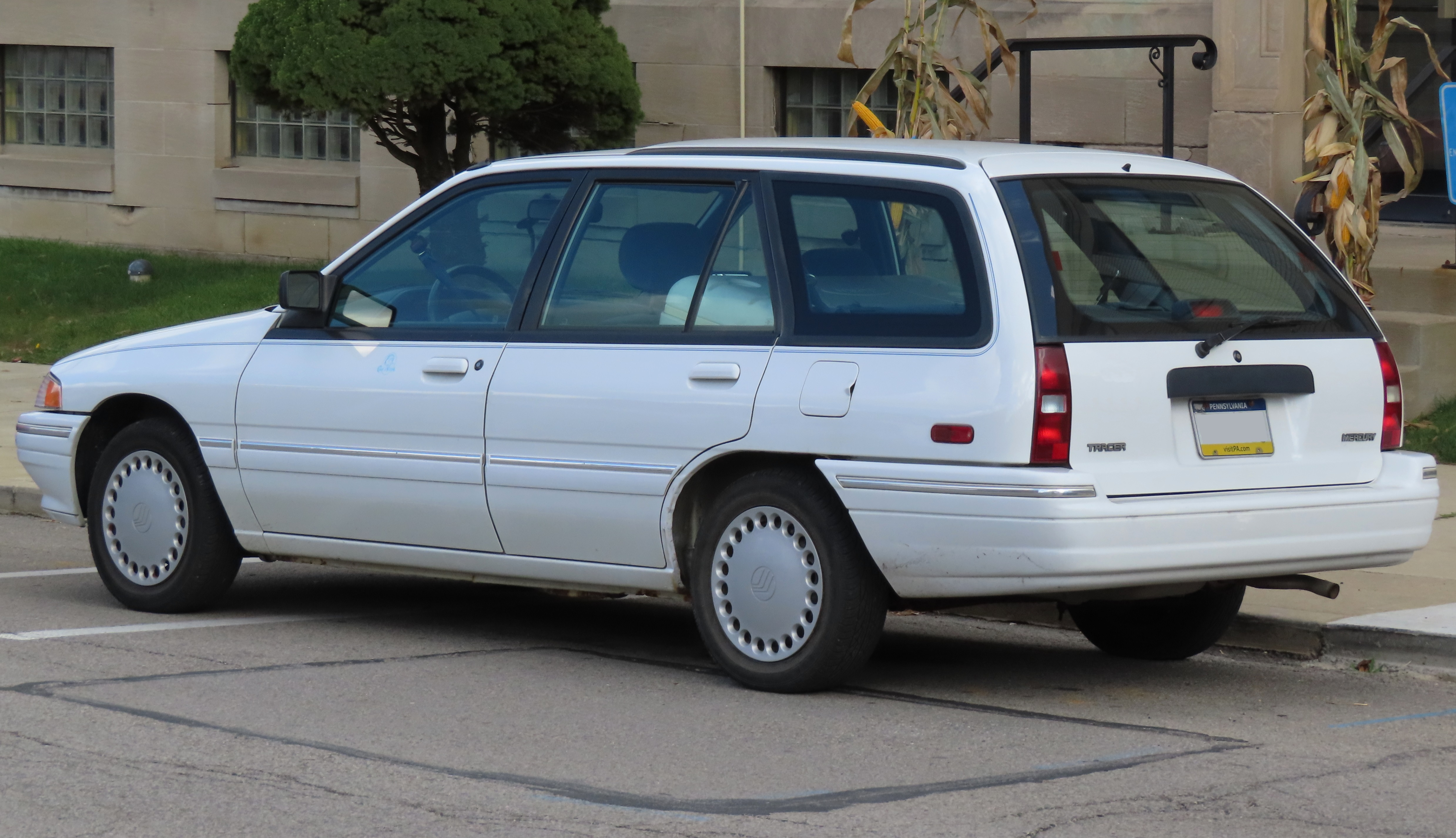
1995 Mercury Tracer wagon

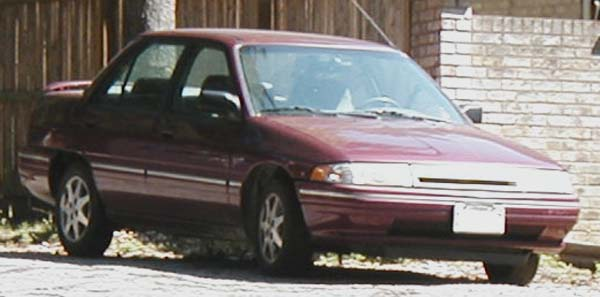
Mercury Tracer sedan with Trio package

== Third generation (1997–1999) ==
Third generation
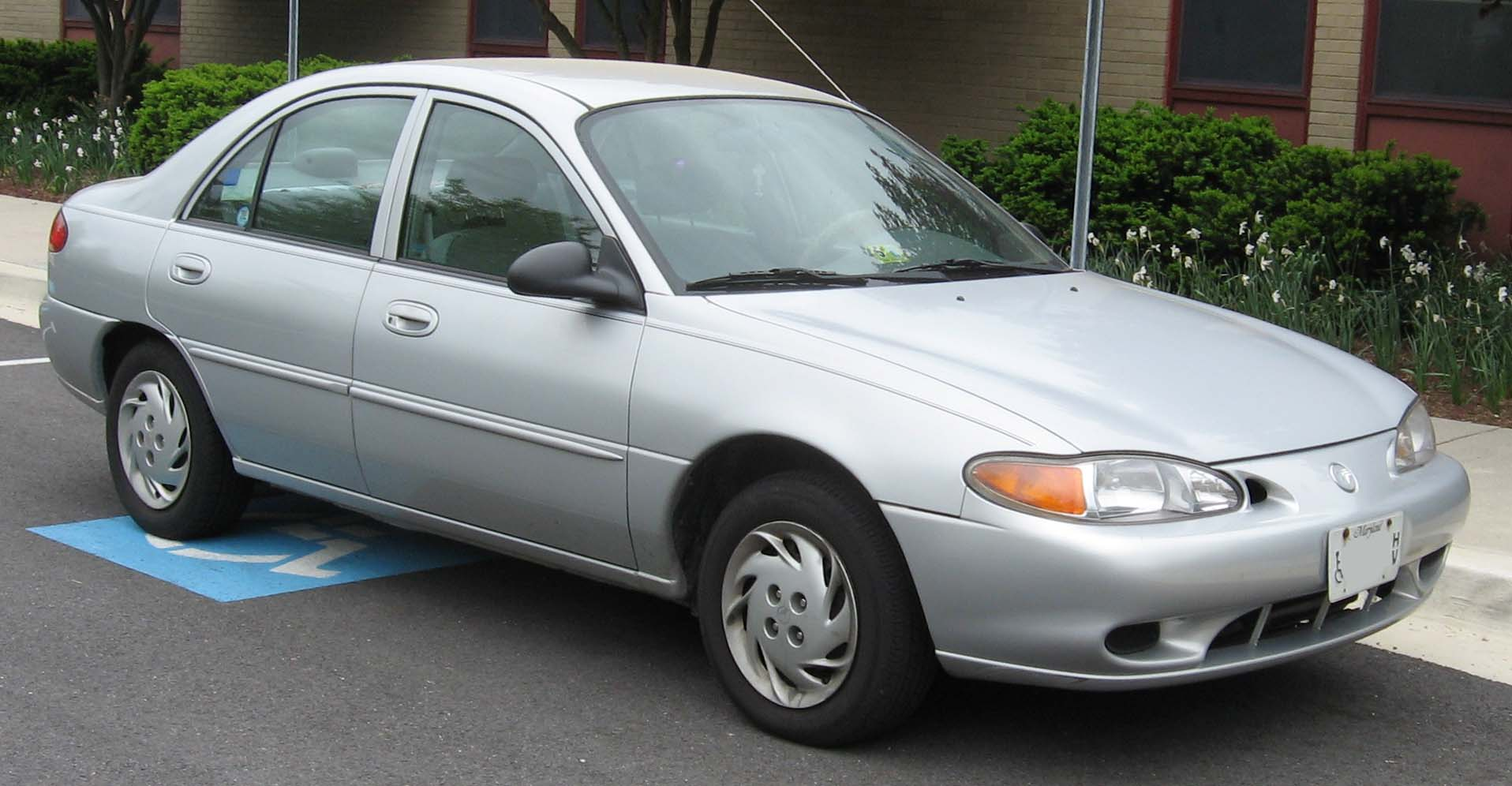

Overview
- Production: 1996–1999
- Model years: 1997–1999
- Assembly: Wayne, Michigan

Body and chassis
- Body style: 4-door sedan 5-door station wagon
- Related: Ford Escort; Mazda Protegé

Powertrain
- Engine: 2.0 L CVH SPI I4
- Transmission: 5-speed IB5 manual 4-speed F-4EAT automatic

Dimensions
- Wheelbase: 98.4 in (2,500 mm)
- Length: Wagon: 172.7 in (4,387 mm); Sedan: 174.7 in (4,440 mm)
- Width: 67.0 in (1,700 mm)
- Height: Sedan: 53.3 in (1,350 mm); Wagon: 53.9 in (1,369 mm)

For 1997, the third-generation Mercury Tracer was released, sharing its redesign alongside the third-generation Ford Escort. Retaining the same Mazda-based chassis underpinnings from the previous generation, the body was all-new with substantial revisions to the powertrain. No longer related to the Ford Laser (which had followed the design updates of the Mazda Protegé since 1994), the third-generation Tracer was derived solely from the Ford Escort.

This generation is the only version to be assembled entirely in the United States, with all assembly consolidated at Wayne Stamping & Assembly in Wayne, Michigan. Following the 1999 model year, the Tracer was withdrawn (along with the Escort station wagon). For 1999, 23,146 examples were sold. The final Mercury Tracer rolled off the assembly line on July 2, 1999.

=== Chassis ===
The third-generation Tracer is derived from the front-wheel drive Ford CT120 platform, used again by Ford, sharing the same 98.4-inch wheelbase as the previous generation. The sole engine is a 110-horsepower (82 kW) 2.0-litre CVH Split-Port Induction (SPI) inline-four, paired with either a 5-speed manual or a 4-speed automatic transmission.

=== Body ===
The third-generation Tracer again was offered in four-door sedan and five-door station wagon configurations; hatchbacks had been withdrawn entirely. The Ford Escort ZX2 two-door coupe bodystyle (sharing the chassis, but no body panels of the sedan/wagon) was not offered as a Mercury Tracer. As with the previous generation, the model line was distinguished from its Ford counterpart by its front fascia design, taillamps, and model-specific wheelcovers. The station wagon shared much of its bodyshell from the previous generation (from the windshield rearward), with updates concentrated on the front fascia, sideview mirrors, door handles, interior dashboard, and exterior badging.

As with previous generations, the third-generation Tracer was sold in GS and LS trims, with Mercury also offering a Trio appearance package for the GS. The LS trim was distinguished by alloy wheels, leather interior, keyless entry, power windows and door locks, and tachometer.

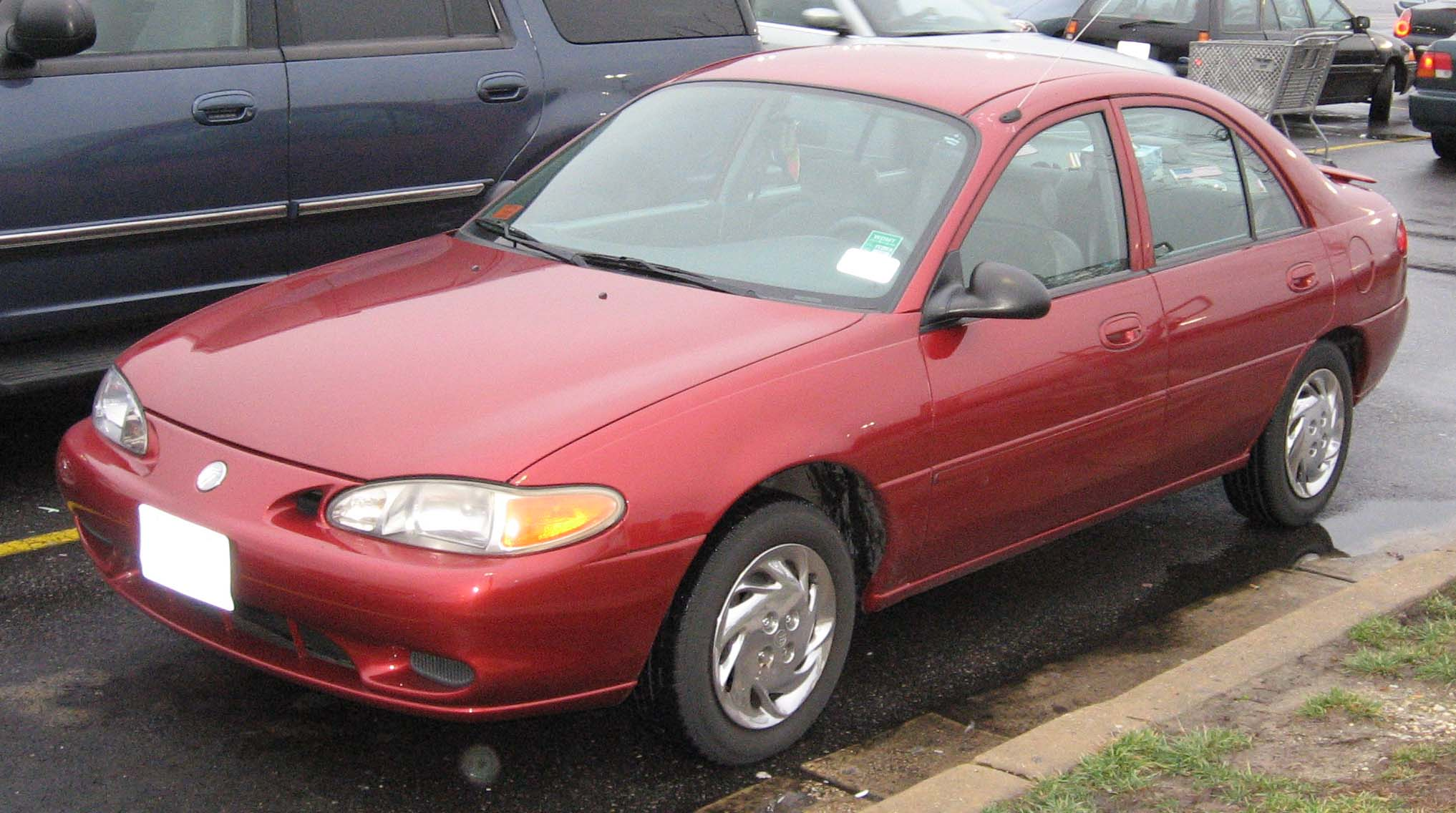
Mercury Tracer GS sedan

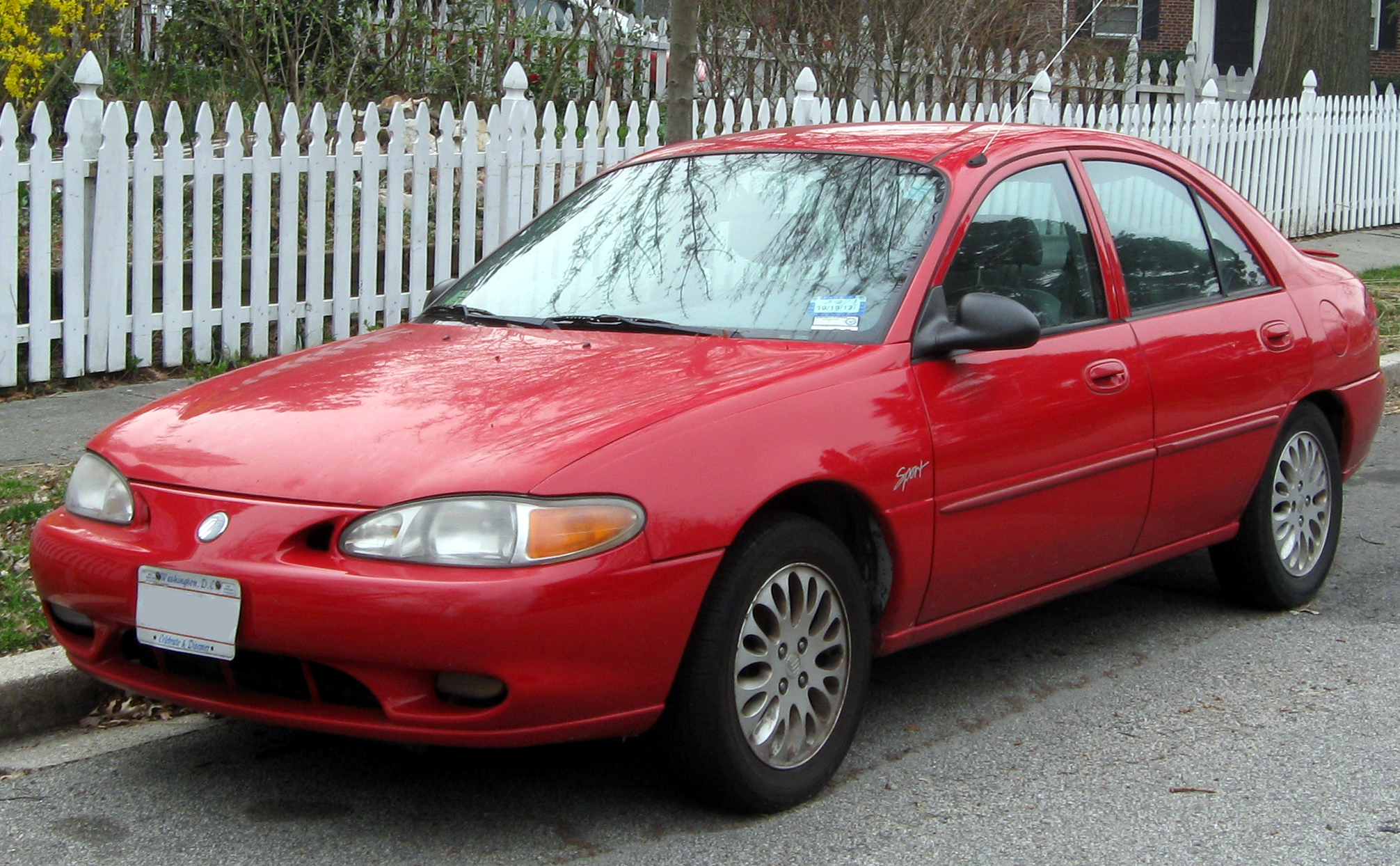
Mercury Tracer LS sedan

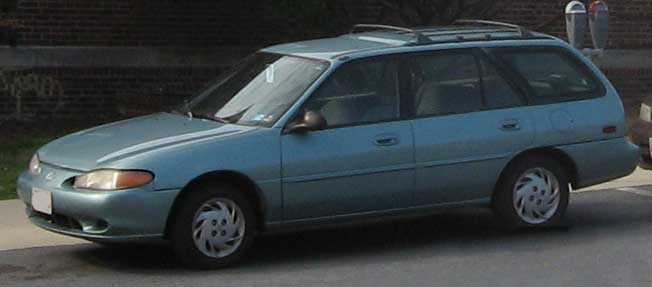
Mercury Tracer GS station wagon

== Proposed 2011 revival ==
Shortly before the closure of the Mercury division, Ford had been working on a revival of the Mercury Tracer model line. In early 2010, Ford confirmed its 2012 model lines with its dealers that year, with Mercury adding a compact sedan derived from the redesigned 2012 Ford Focus. Slotted below the Mercury Milan in size, the Focus-derived Mercury was unofficially confirmed to have the Mercury Tracer nameplate (ending a 13-year hiatus). The new compact would have allowed Mercury to retain two sedan lines for 2012; at the time, the Mercury Grand Marquis was intended for discontinuation after 2011.

In the summer of 2010, the model line development ended as Ford announced the closure of the Mercury division at the end of the calendar year.
