= Mazda M5 transmission =

The M5 is a manual transaxle.

== Applications ==
- Mercury Tracer (1991-1996)
- Ford Escort (1.8 L, 1.9 L, 2.0 L)
- Ford Festiva
- Ford Probe (2.2 L non-turbo & turbo)
