= Ford Tempo =

Car model

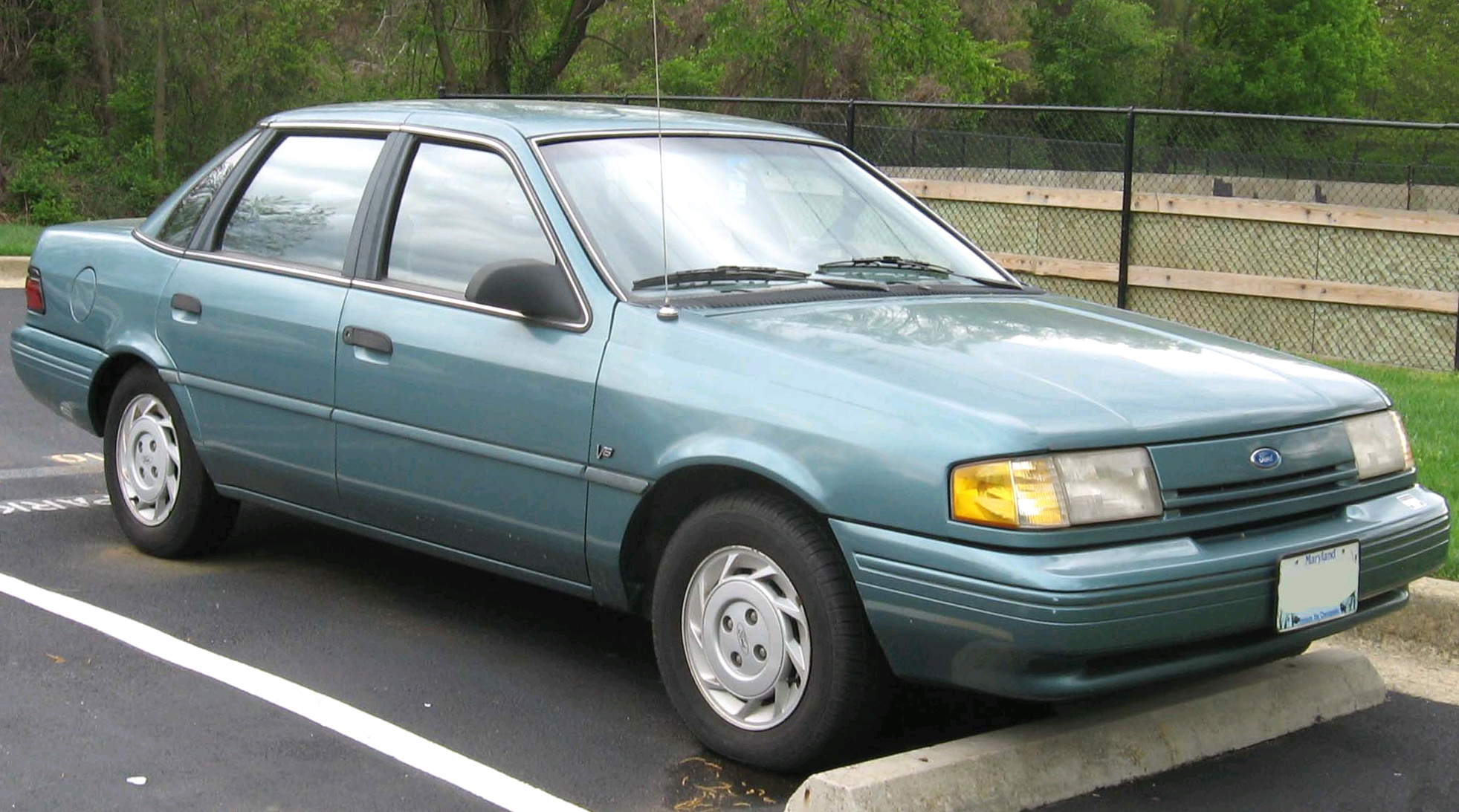
- 1992–1994 Ford Tempo

Overview
- Manufacturer: Ford
- Also called: Ford Ghia; Ford Topaz; Mercury Topaz
- Production: 1983–1994
- Model years: 1984–1994
- Assembly: United States: Claycomo, Missouri (Kansas City Assembly); Canada: Oakville, Ontario (Oakville Assembly); Mexico: Cuautitlán Izcalli (Cuautitlán Assembly)
- Designer: Jack Telnack

Body and chassis
- Class: Compact
- Layout: FF layout AWD layout

Chronology
- Predecessor: Ford Fairmont / Mercury Zephyr
- Successor: Ford Contour / Mercury Mystique

The Ford Tempo is a compact car that was manufactured by Ford from the 1984 to 1994 model years. The successor of the Ford Fairmont, the Tempo is the fourth generation of compact cars sold by Ford in North America, marking both its downsizing and adoption of front-wheel drive. Through its entire production, the Tempo was sold as a two-door coupe and four-door sedan; Lincoln-Mercury marketed the model line as its Mercury Topaz divisional counterpart.

Deriving its chassis underpinnings and powertrain from the Ford Escort, the Tempo marked the introduction of aerodynamic exterior designs for a Ford sedan line. First seen on European Ford Sierra hatchbacks and the 1983 redesign of the Ford Thunderbird coupe, the design language was advanced further with the introduction of the larger Ford Taurus (introduced for 1986). The first Ford car line to offer all-wheel drive as an option, the Tempo was also the first American automobile to offer a driver-side airbag as an option.

Produced across multiple facilities in North America, the Tempo/Topaz was produced in a single generation of two-doors; two generations of four-door sedans were produced. For the 1995 model year, the Tempo/Topaz four-door sedan was replaced by the Ford Contour (and Mercury Mystique), developed from the Ford Mondeo; the two-door Tempo was not directly replaced.

== Development ==
In the late 1970s Ford began planning to replace their compact rear wheel drive Ford Fairmont and Mercury Zephyr models with a new smaller front wheel drive (FWD) car. This new compact was expected to compete in the marketplace with General Motors' X-Body, but wound up more similar to GM's J-cars. Ford's chief development engineer for the new car was Ed Cascardo.

The Tempo and Topaz chassis shared some parts with the front-wheel-drive platform used on the first North American Ford Escort, but with a wheelbase stretched by 5.7 in (145 mm) and distinctive new bodies. There were few common components due to the Tempo and Topaz's larger size. Switching to front-wheel drive freed up interior space that would have otherwise been lost to accommodate a driveshaft and rear differential.

Wind tunnel testing on the Tempo began in December 1978. More than 450 hours of testing resulted in over 950 different design changes. The Tempo and Topaz both featured windshields inclined at a 60° angle and aircraft-inspired door frames, two features that had both appeared on the Thunderbird and Cougar in 1983. The door frames wrapped up into the roofline, which improved sealing, allowed for hidden drip rails, and cleaned up the A-pillar area of the car. The rear track was widened, improving aerodynamic efficiency. The front grille was laid back and the leading edge of the hood was tuned for aerodynamic cleanliness. The wheels were pushed out to the corners of the body, reducing turbulence. The cars' backlights were also laid down at 60°, and the rear deck was raised, reducing drag and resulting in greater fuel efficiency. Viewed from the side, the raised trunk imparted a wedge stance to the car which was especially prominent on the two-door coupes. The aerodynamic work resulted in a coefficient of drag ($\scriptstyle C_\mathrm d\,$) of 0.36 for the two-door Tempo, equal to that of the aero Ford Thunderbird. The four door returned a drag coefficient of 0.37.

The Tempo was designed for a four-cylinder engine, but all production of Ford's 2.3 L Lima OHC four was committed to other product lines. In 1983 Ford had stopped production of their 200 cubic inch Thriftpower inline six, leaving unused capacity at the Lima Engine plant. Ford developed a four-cylinder engine that shared some features of the Thriftpower six, topped with a new cylinder head and using other new technologies, while repurposing as much tooling as possible at the Lima plant.

When the cars were released, a turbocharged version of the new four cylinder was said to be in development, but this engine never became available. At that point, a V6 was not being considered.

Released in 1983 as a 1984 model, more than 107,000 two-door Tempos and more than 295,000 four-door Tempos were sold in its first year.

== Features ==
=== Chassis and suspension ===
The Tempo's chassis is a steel unibody. The structure from the firewall forward is shared with the contemporary Ford Escort.

The Tempo's front suspension on each side comprises a lower lateral link triangulated by the anti-roll bar and a coil over MacPherson strut. The rear "Quadralink" suspension is two parallel lower lateral control links and a radius rod per side, with coil over MacPherson struts. This differed from the Escort's rear suspension, which used a lower lateral arm, radius rod, and non-concentric coil spring and shock absorber. The Tempo was the first ever American built Ford with an independent rear suspension using MacPherson struts.

Brakes are 9.3 in (236 mm) discs in front and 8.0 in × 1.2 in (203 mm × 30 mm) drums in back.

Steering is by power assisted rack and pinion, with three turns lock-to-lock.

Standard tires on base models are 175/80R13, while higher trim levels have 185/70R14, and sportier models are fitted with Michelin TRX 185/65R365 metric tires on aluminum wheels.

=== Powertrain ===
The Tempo's four cylinder gasoline engine is called the "High Swirl Combustion" (HSC) engine and displaces 2.3 L. It has a cast iron block and head, with a single cam-in-block and two overhead valves (OHV) per cylinder with pushrods and rocker arms. The HSC engine was also offered in a "High Specific Output" (HSO) version producing 100 hp (75 kW).

In 1992 the 3.0 L Ford Vulcan V6 engine became an option in the Tempo. Fitting the Vulcan V6 into the Tempo required changes to the water pump, and use of a more restrictive exhaust system that reduced maximum power.

The original base transmission in the gasoline fueled Tempo/Topaz is a four-speed IB4 manual that made up part of what Ford called the "Fuel Saver" powertrain. A five-speed MTX-III manual or a three-speed FLC automatic were optional upgrades.

From 1984 to 1986 a version of Mazda's four-cylinder RF diesel engine was offered in the Tempo and Topaz. The only transmission paired with the diesel engine was the 5-speed manual.

=== All Wheel Drive ===
An optional all-wheel drive (AWD) system became available in the Tempo and Topaz in 1987, and was offered until 1991. Although Ford had a long history with four wheel drive, and had built prototypes based on other car models before, the AWD Tempo was their first production passenger sedan to offer four wheel drive.

This design of part-time system is not meant for serious off-road driving, nor for use on dry streets. It is designed specifically to provide additional traction in slippery road conditions. The system is controlled by a rocker switch in the interior. When activated, the system engages a clutch which sends power to a limited-slip rear differential via a new driveshaft. There is no transfer case.

The all-wheel-drive system adds 105 lb (47.6 kg) to the weight of the car, and increases ride height by just 0.5 in (13 mm). The only engine offered with the AWD option was the HSO four-cylinder, coupled with the 3-speed automatic transmission.

In 1991 Ford started branding the system as "Four Wheel Drive" instead of All Wheel Drive.

== First generation (1984–1987) ==
First generation
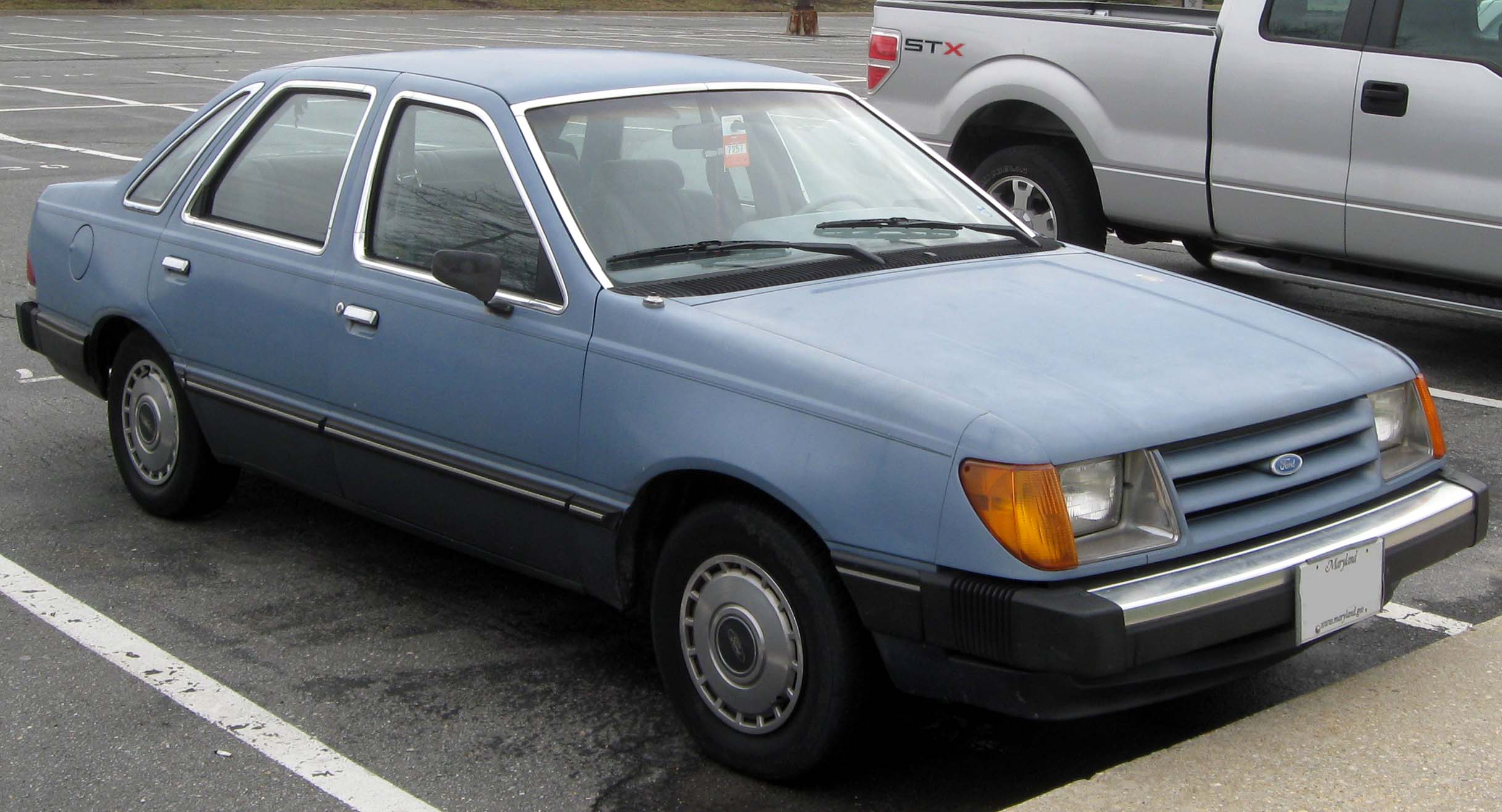
- 1984–1985 Ford Tempo

Overview
- Production: 1983–1987
- Model years: 1984–1987

Body and chassis
- Body style: 2/4-door sedan
- Related: Ford Escort / Mercury Lynx; Ford EXP

Powertrain
- Engine: 2.3 L HSC I4 (gasoline); 2.3 L HSO I4 (gasoline); 2.0 L Mazda RF I4 (diesel)
- Transmission: 3-speed ATX/FLC automatic; 4-speed IB4 manual; 5-speed MTX-III manual

Dimensions
- Wheelbase: 99.9 in (2,537 mm)
- Length: 176.7 in (4,488 mm)
- Width: 68.3 in (1,735 mm)
- Height: 52.7 in (1,339 mm)

The first-generation Ford Tempo was released for sale on May 26, 1983 for the 1984 model model year. Replacing the Ford Fairmont, the Tempo became the fourth line of compact cars offered by Ford and its first compact car designed with a front-wheel drive powertrain layout. Nearly 17 inches shorter in length (six inches shorter in wheelbase) and three inches narrower than the Fairmont, the Tempo have Ford a direct competitor to the GM X-platform compacts and the Chrysler K-car model lines, along with Honda Accord and Toyota Camry sedans. The model line was marketed through Lincoln-Mercury as the Mercury Topaz (replacing the Mercury Zephyr).

For its product release, Ford unveiled the Ford Tempo and Mercury Topaz on the deck of the USS Intrepid, a decommissioned aircraft carrier turned into a floating museum in New York Harbor. An early advertisement for the car featured a Tempo sedan performing a 360 degree loop on a stunt track. The car in the ad was securely attached to a track, and was pulled through the shot rather than operating under its own power.

As with the Ford Sierra, the Tempo sedan derived its six-window roofline profile from the 1981 Ford Probe III concept vehicle, though with a triple-slatted body-color grille. At the time of its release, flush-mounted headlamps were not yet legal for use in North America, necessitating the fitment of recessed sealed-beam headlamps. Two-door Tempo/Topaz coupes were styled with a trapezoidal window profile (with black B-pillars). Sharing its doors with its Ford counterpart, the Mercury Topaz sedan was styled with a four-window roofline, adopting a fully-painted C-pillar with a slightly more upright profile (though far sleeker than larger Mercury sedans). The Tempo was styled with red horizontal taillamps, while the Topaz used red vertical taillamps joined with a red and gray filler panel. The 1984 Topaz also marked the debut of the redesigned Mercury brand emblem, used through the closure of the brand in 2011.

The first generation Tempo/Topaz was offered with two different engines: a 90 hp 2.3 L HSC inline-4 (effectively, ⅔ of the Ford Fairmont inline-6 adapted for front-wheel drive) and a Mazda-sourced 2.0 L RF diesel inline-4. For 1985, the 2.3L engine received a new central fuel injection (CFI) system, although the carbureted version was offered in Canada until 1987. Initially, 4-speed and 5-speed manual transmissions were offered, alongside a 3-speed automatic. Late in the 1985 model year, the 4-speed manual was discontinued in favor of making the 5-speed standard. At the same time, the shift pattern of the latter was revised from a dog-leg pattern to an H-pattern.

Several functional changes were made to the interior for 1985 as the dashboard was redesigned to include side window demisters, a restyled driver's pod (separating the radio), and a passenger-side shelf. The instrument panel featured a new, easier to read gauge layout, with all switches and controls placed within easy reach of the driver.

In early 1985, the Tempo became the first production American automobile to feature a driver's side airbag (optionally) as a supplemental restraint system. In 1984, Ford entered a contract with the General Services Administration and the Department of Transportation to supply 5,000 airbag-equipped Tempos. Half also received a special windshield designed to minimize lacerations to passengers, and all were early recipients of the high-mounted brake lights that became required by law in 1986.

From 1985 to 1987, Ford offered the Sport GL, which included unique interior and exterior styling cues, the 2.3 L HSO engine, alloy wheels, tachometer, and the five-speed manual transaxle with a lower (numerically higher) final drive ratio of 3.73 for quicker acceleration. It was badged simply as "GL", but was recognizable because it lacked the GL's chrome front and rear bumpers, had 14" alloy wheels and charcoal trim accents.

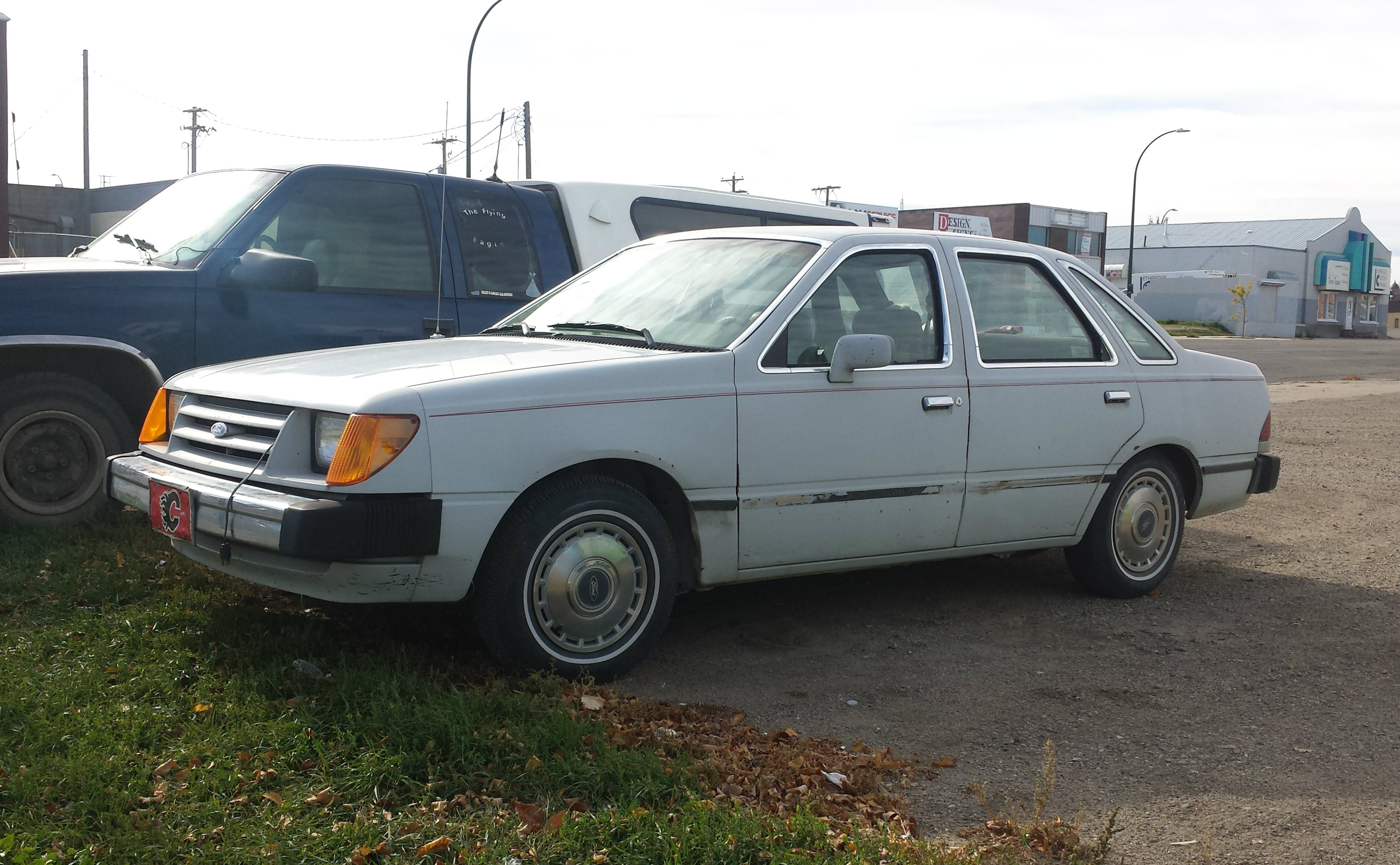
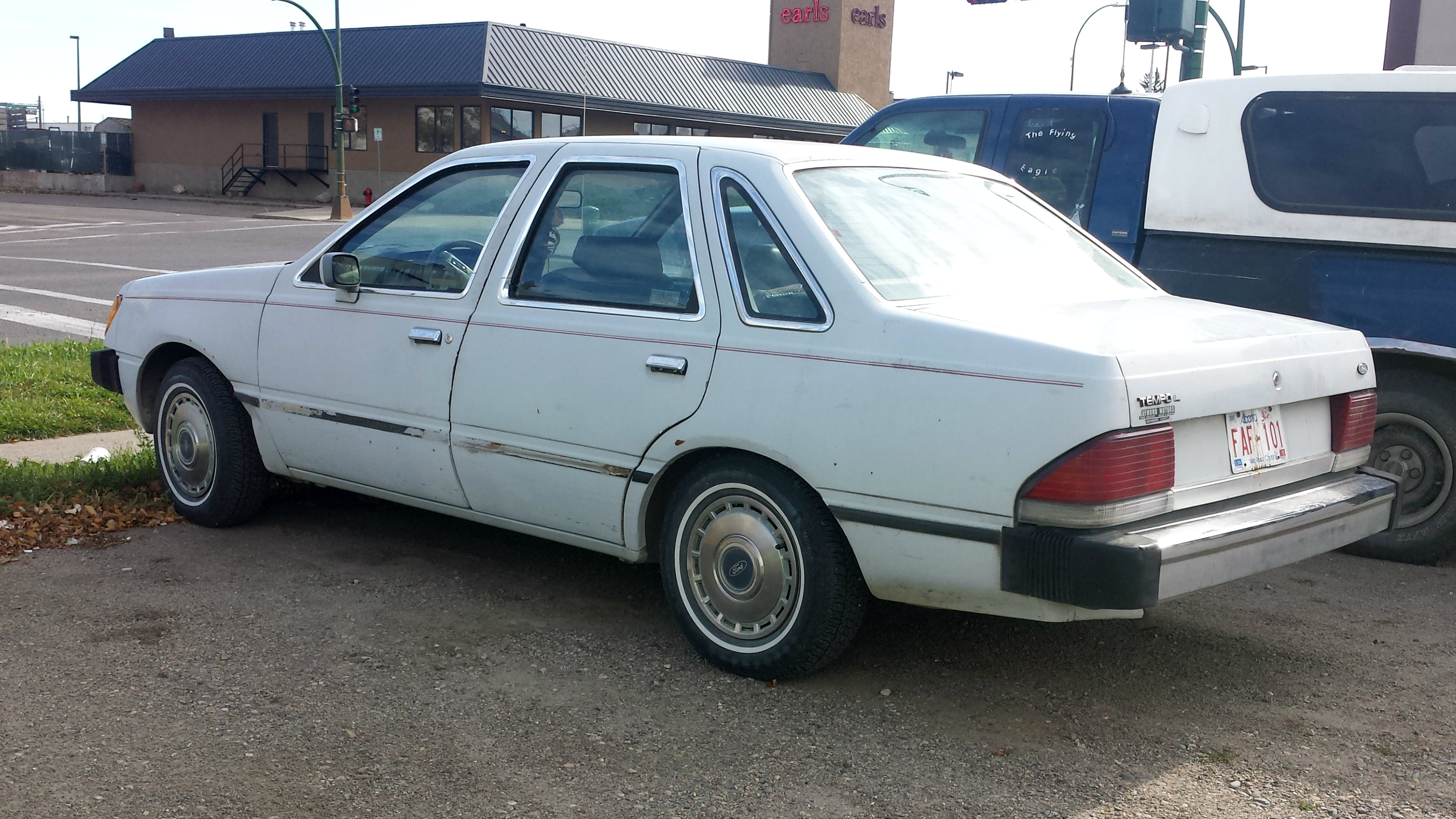
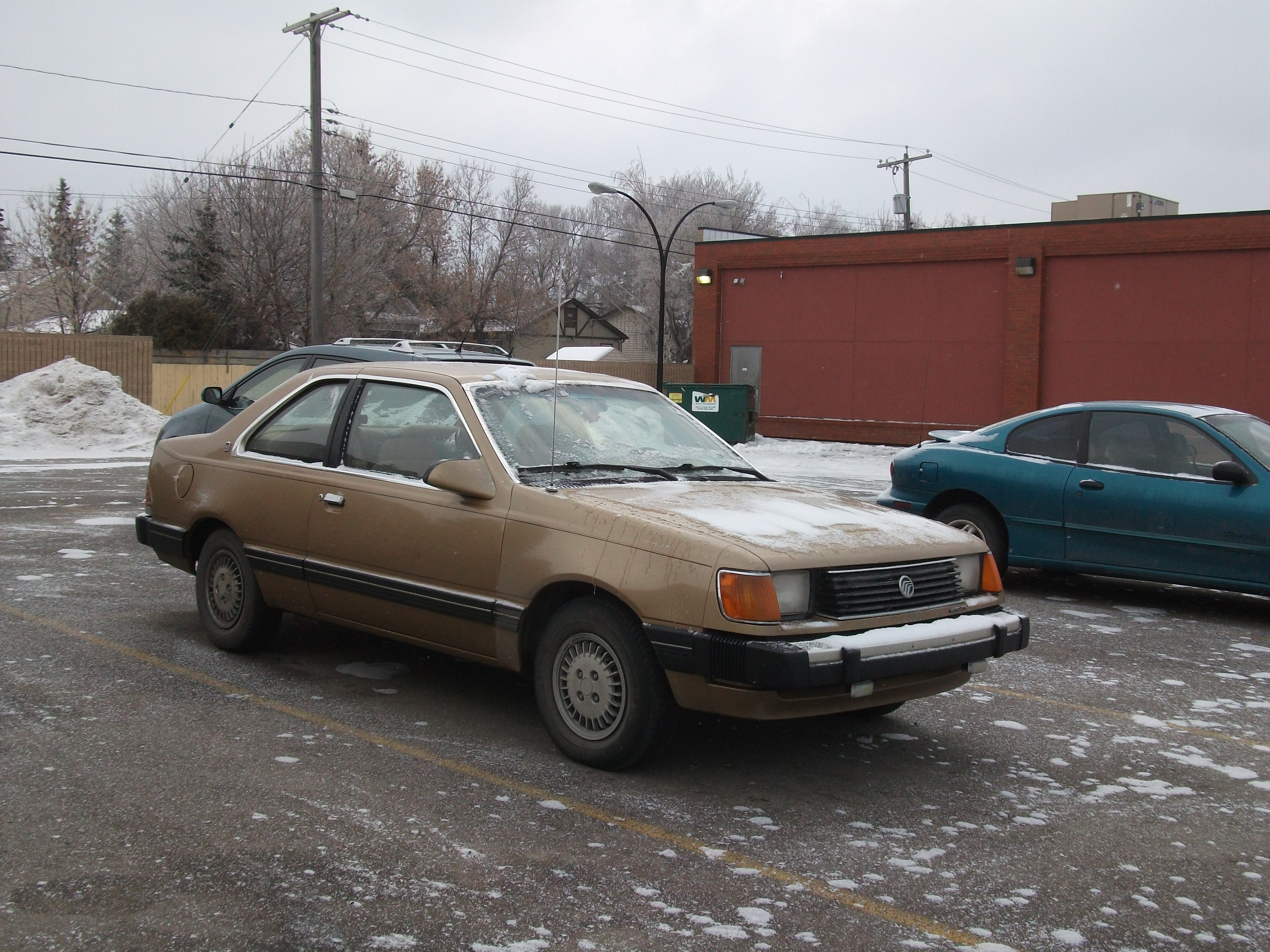
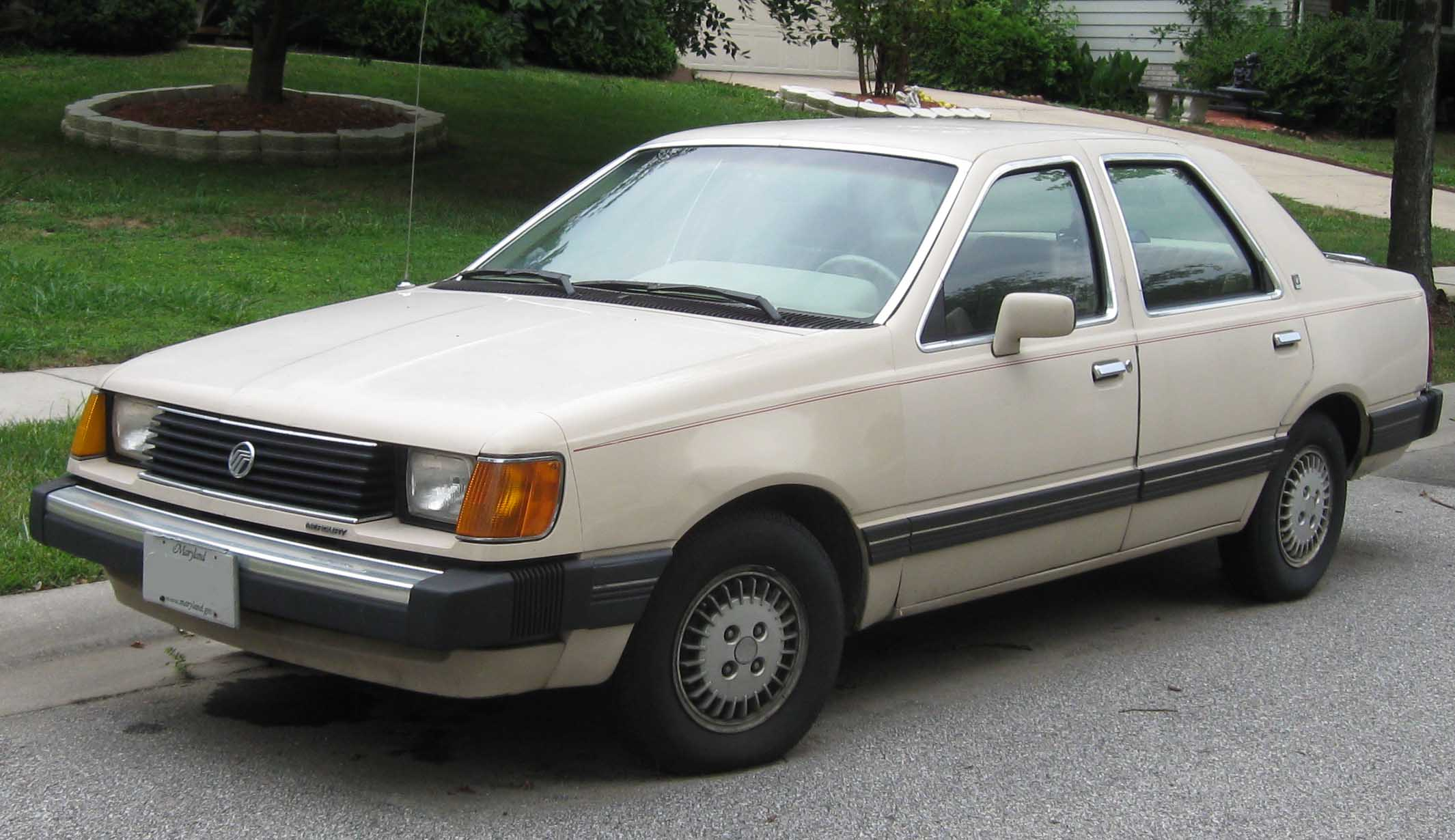
Top row: 1984-1985 Ford Tempo L sedan
Second row: 1984 Mercury Topaz GS coupe, 1984 Mercury Topaz GS sedan

=== 1986 update ===
For the 1986 model year, both the Tempo and Topaz underwent a mid-cycle update of the exterior. Largely intended to bring the exterior closer in line with the design of the 1986 Ford Taurus, the Tempo received composite-style headlamps (with restyled parking lamps), full-width taillamps, and a restyled "bottom-breather" grille. To further update its appearance, the sedan adopted the sideview mirrors of the coupe and the bumpers were redesigned to become further integrated with the body (sharing a gray body molding with the doors). To further distinguish the Topaz from the Tempo, the model was fitted with a lightbar grille (a feature shared with the Sable). In line with other Ford vehicles, the flagship Tempo GLX was renamed, becoming the Tempo LX.

In 1986, the Ford Tempo surpassed the Hyundai Pony to become the best selling new car in Canada.

For 1987, an all-wheel drive option was introduced for both two-door and four-door versions of both the Tempo and Topaz. Serving as a stand-alone trim line, the all-wheel drive version was equipped as an equivalent to a Tempo LX/Topaz LS and was fitted with the more powerful engine of the GL Sport. Fitted only with an automatic transmission, all-wheel drive was a driver-activated system using a pushbutton.

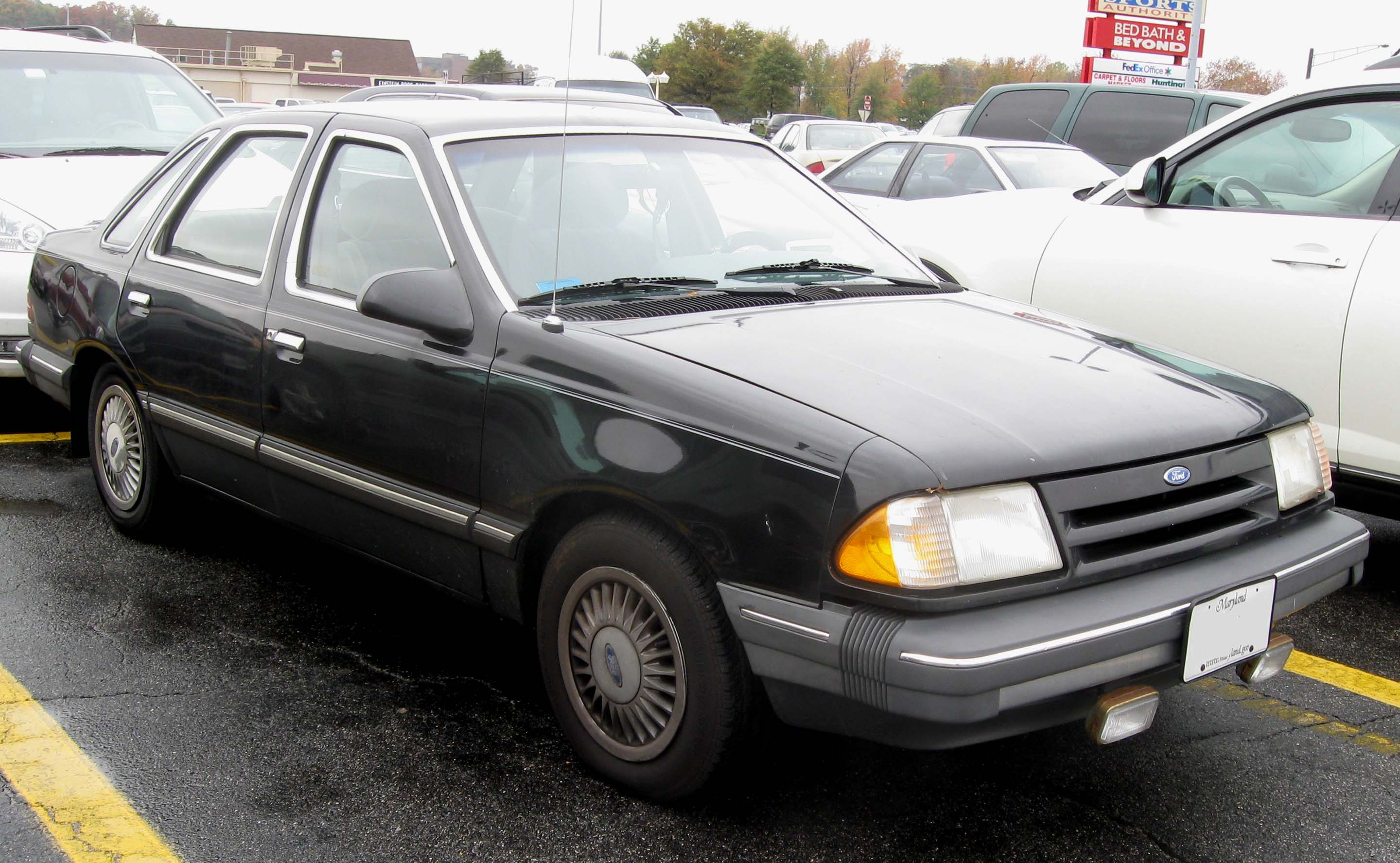
Ford Tempo LX (facelift)

1986 Ford Tempo GL coupe

1986-1987 Mercury Topaz GS

1986-1987 Mercury Topaz GS (rear)

=== Trim levels ===
First generation Tempo trim levels:

- L (Entry level model)
- GL (Mid-range model. Also Sport GL)
- GLX (Luxury model. 1984 and 1985 model years only)
- LX (Luxury model. Introduced for 1986. Replaced the GLX)
- AWD (1987 model year only.)

First generation Topaz trim levels:

- L (Entry level model. 1984 model year only)
- GS (Mid-range model. Equivalent to Tempo GL)
- GS-AWD (1987 model year only)
- LS (Luxury model)
- LS-AWD (1987 model year only)
- XR5 (Sport model. 1987 model year only. Coupe only)

== Second generation (1988–1994) ==
Second generation
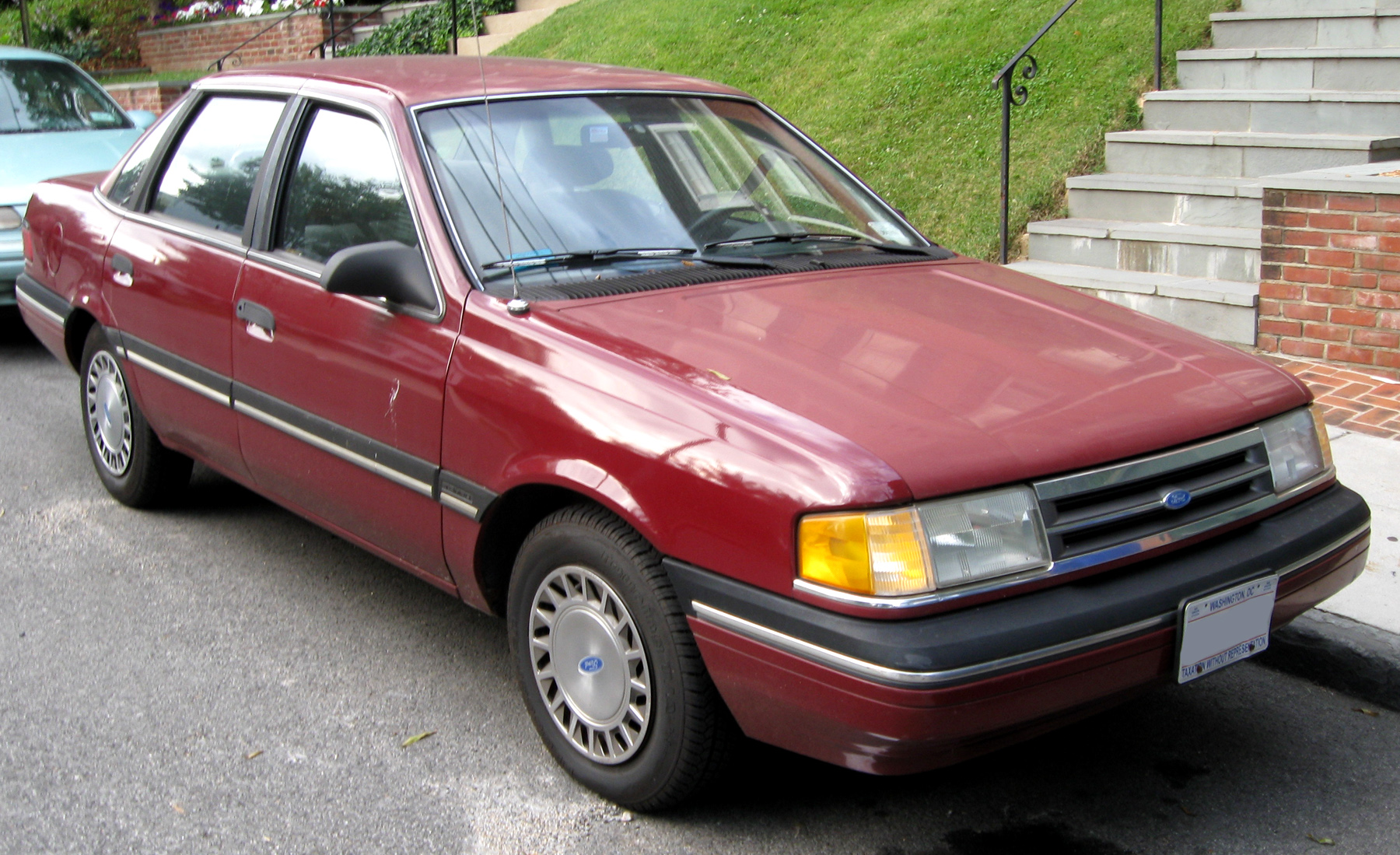
- 1988–1991 Ford Tempo GL

Overview
- Model years: 1988–1994

Body and chassis
- Body style: 2/4-door sedan
- Related: Ford Escort / Mercury Lynx; Ford EXP

Powertrain
- Engine: 2.3 L HSC/HSO I4; 3.0 L Vulcan V6
- Transmission: 3-speed ATX/FLC automatic; 5-speed MTX-III manual; 5-speed MTX-IV manual

Dimensions
- Wheelbase: 99.9 in (2,537 mm)
- Length: 177.0 in (4,496 mm)
- Width: 68.3 in (1,735 mm)
- Height: 52.9 in (1,344 mm)
- Curb weight: 2,723 lb (1,235 kg)

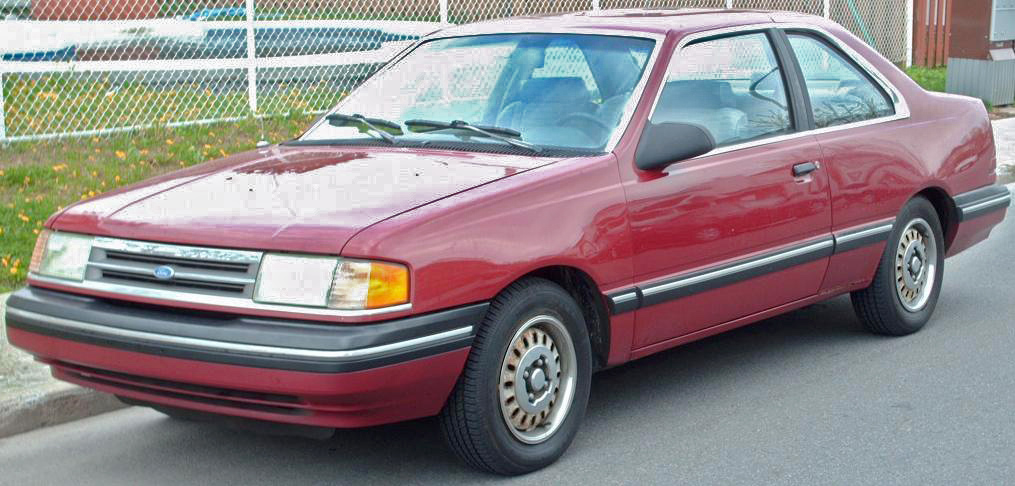
1988–1991 Ford Tempo coupe

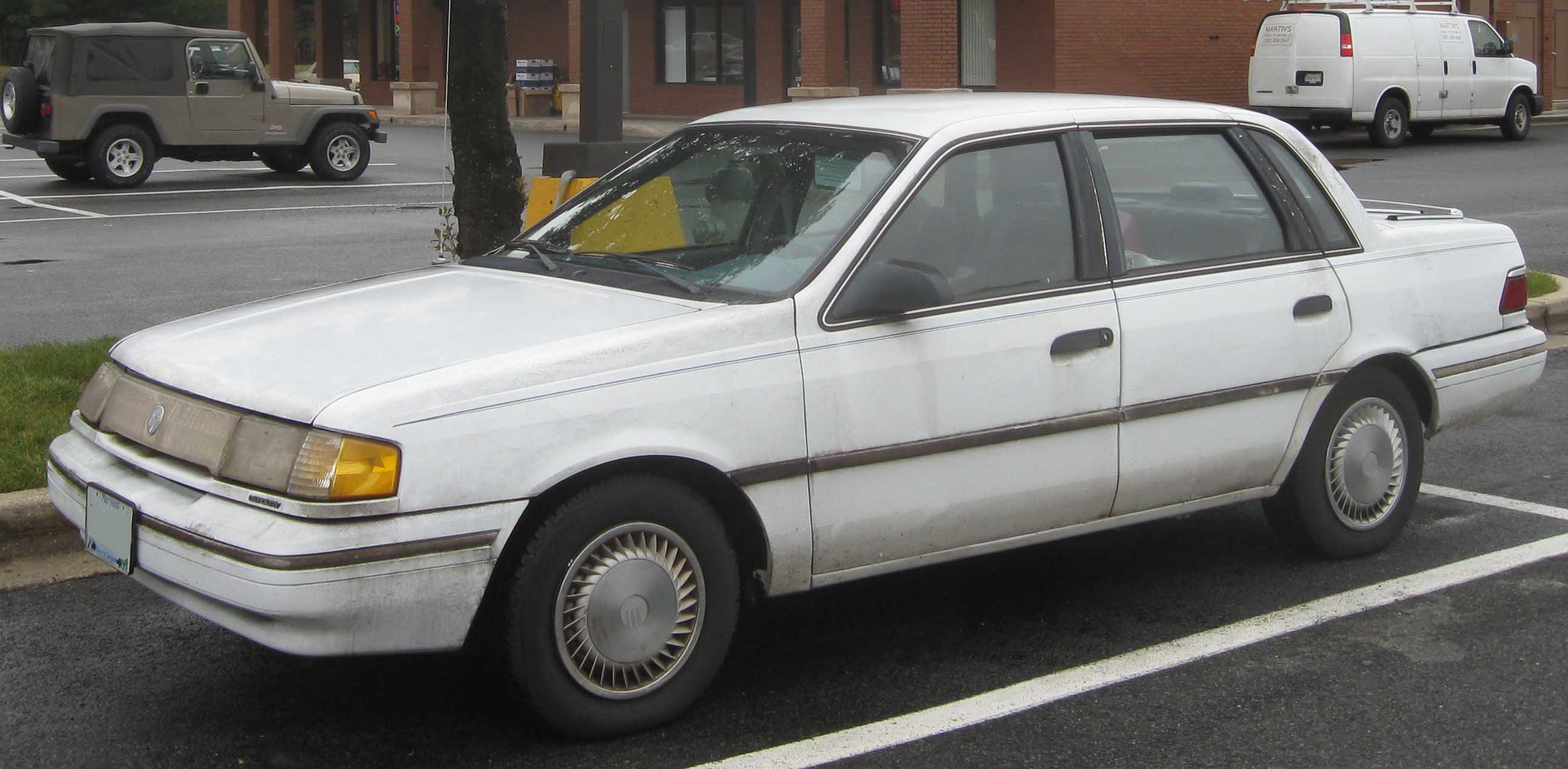
1992–1994 Mercury Topaz GS sedan

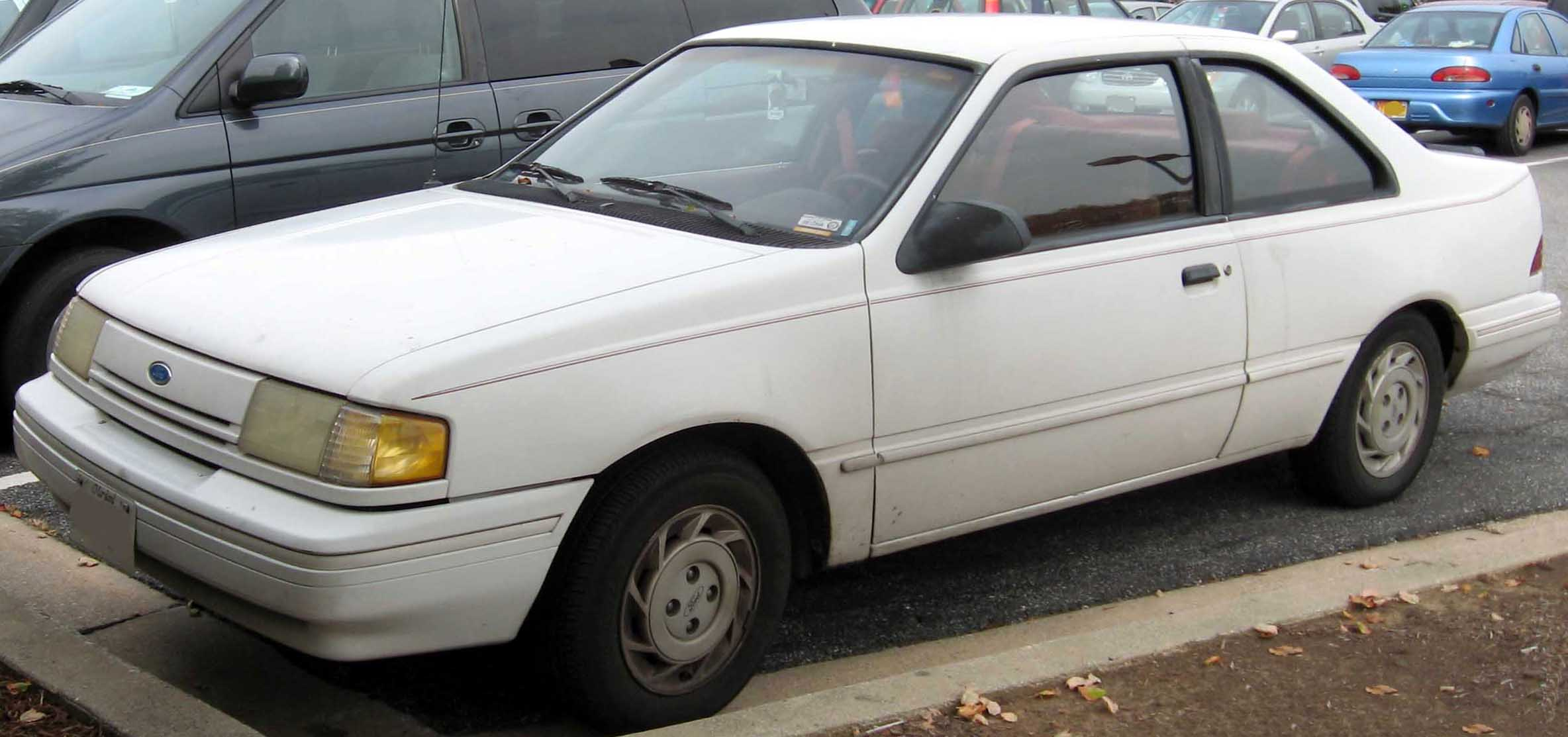
1992–1994 Ford Tempo coupe

For 1988, the Tempo and Topaz sedans were redesigned, while the coupes were facelifted — in each case more resembling their Taurus and Sable counterparts. Both cars arrived in November 1987. The Tempo received a restyled grille with three thin horizontal chrome bars, composite flush-mounted rectangular headlamps and restyled front turn signals. The Tempo GLS, received a black grille and "D" pillar; flush mounted tail lamps and revised rear quarter window. The Topaz received a more formal, more vertical rear window, waterfall grille, more revised wheels, and solid red tail lamps. The HSO engine was standard equipment on the Mercury Topaz XR5 and LTS models.

Both the sedan and coupe received a revised instrument panels with a central gauge cluster that included a standard engine temperature gauge, and ergonomic driver controls. Fan and windshield wiper controls were mounted on rotary-style switches on either side of the instrument panel, and the HVAC controls received a new push-button control layout. Other changes included revised interior door panels. A driver's side airbag continued as an option. LX and AWD models received chrome and wood trim on the dash and doors. Topaz models featured a tachometer-equipped gauge cluster and a front center armrest as standard.

For the 1991 model year the all-wheel drive Tempo and Topaz and the Canadian market exclusive entry-level Tempo L were discontinued. For 1992, the Tempo and Topaz were mildly restyled, with the Tempo gaining body-colored side trim that replaced the black and chrome trim, as well as full body-colored bumpers. The Tempo's three bar chrome grille was replaced with a body-colored monochromatic piece, while the Topaz's chrome grille was replaced with a non-functional light-bar.

Also for 1992, the 3.0 L Vulcan V6 engine from the Taurus and Sable was introduced as an option for the GL and LX models, and as the standard engine on the GLS. The 1992 model year was the last year of the GLS, as it and its Topaz counterpart were discontinued in 1993. This left the Tempo with only two trim level options, GL and LX. 1992 also brought a slightly redesigned gauge cluster, with a tachometer reading up to 7,000 rpm instead of the previous 6,000 rpm. A fuel door indicator was added to the fuel gauge as an arrow pointing to the side of the car where the fuel door was located. 1992 was the only year when a speedometer reading to 120 mph was available in American models, and only in the GLS, XR5 and LTS trim levels; all other model years read to 85 MPH.

A revised body with eight headlamps was previewed late in 1991, and a redesigned Tempo was expected for 1993 or 1998. The Tempo was discontinued in 1994, replaced by the Contour for model year 1995.

=== Trim levels ===
Second generation Tempo trim levels:

- L (Entry level model. Discontinued in 1991)
- GL (Mid-range model)
- LX (Luxury model. Sedan only)
- AWD (Includes LX trim. Sedan only. Discontinued in 1991)
- GLS (Replaced Sport GL as the performance oriented model. Discontinued in 1992)

Second generation Topaz trim levels:

- GS (Mid-range model equivalent to the Tempo GL. Available from November 1987 to 1994)
- GS-AWD (Available from November 1987 to 1991)
- LS (Luxury model. Discontinued after 1992)
- LS-AWD (Sedan only. Available from November 1987 to 1991)
- XR5 (Sport model. Available from November 1987 to 1992. Coupe only. 3.0 L V6 engine was standard for 1992)
- LTS ("Luxury Touring Sedan". Four-door equivalent of the XR5. Available from November 1987 to 1992)

== End of production ==
Although a third-generation Tempo had been spotted testing in 1990, this was eventually scrapped in favor of replacing the car with an adapted version of the European Ford Mondeo, then late in development. By 1993 Ford had been losing money on the Tempo for a decade. While the Tempo had long been a loss leader for Ford, the incoming Contour was based on the Mondeo, one of the most expensive cars in Ford's European lineup. Ford was unsuccessful in drawing a distinction between the Tempo and Contour, and many buyers assumed that the new car would be priced the same as the old, causing some to face a large sticker shock.

For buyers shopping for a compact Ford, moving to the Contour came with a jump in price: the range topping 1994 Tempo LX sedan with V6 cost about $12,900, equivalent to $25,470 in 2022, while a base model 1995 Contour GL with four-cylinder engine and manual transmission was $13,990, equivalent to $27,622 in 2022.

1994 marked the last year for the HSC engine, the 2.5 L having been dropped from the Taurus in 1991. It was also the end for the 3-speed FLC automatic transmission, with the Ford Escort and Mercury Tracer using the Ford F-4EAT transmission.

The last Ford Tempo was built at Oakville Assembly on May 20, 1994. The facility was retooled to build the Ford Windstar. Kansas City Assembly and Cuautitlán Assembly became assembly points for the Ford Contour and Mercury Mystique.

== Production figures ==
The Tempo was a sales success for Ford, staying one of the top ten best selling cars in the US, if not one of the top five, during its entire production run. For the introductory, extended 1984 model year (16 months long), Ford sold a total of 531,468 examples of the Tempo and Topaz combined, but this was also the nameplate's best year. All model year production figures for the Tempo are as follows:

First generation production
	Coupe	Sedan	Yearly total
1984	107,065	295,149	402,214 (Note: Model year 1984 began in 1983; about 35 percent of the 1984s were built during the 1983 model year.)
1985	72,311	266,776	339,087
1986	69,101	208,570	277,671
1987	70,164	212,468	282,632
Total	318,641	982,963	1,301,604

Second generation production
	Coupe	Sedan	Yearly total
1988	49,930	313,262	363,192
1989	23,719	217,185	240,904
1990	8,551	209,875	218,426
1991	4,876	180,969	185,845
1992	35,149	172,191	207,340
1993	52,129	154,762	206,891
1994	32,050	110,399	142,449
Total	206,404	1,358,643	1,565,047

== Other markets ==
=== China ===
During the early 1990s, in an attempt to ease trade tensions with the United States, China agreed to buy millions of dollars' worth of automobiles from each of the Big Three American automakers; the share of the deal for Ford was worth $32 million. Along with reducing Chinese dependence on imports of Japanese automobiles, the arrangement let China keep its favored nation status with the United States (despite political tensions of the late 1980s).

In 1992, Ford began sales operations in China for the first time, introducing the Tempo alongside the Ford Taurus, Ford Crown Victoria, Ford Aerostar, and the Lincoln Town Car. In total, the Chinese government purchased over 8,200 Tempos, with the initial order of 3010 1992 four-door Tempo sedans serving as the largest single fleet order ever received by Ford. In addition of the fitment of metric-unit instrument panels, the Tempo underwent several revisions for the Chinese market, including modifications of the fuel system to accommodate leaded fuel, heavier-duty suspension, and heavier-grade wiring.

The initial government fleet order was originally intended for use as taxis and tourist vehicles; all were white-colored GL-trim four-door sedans. Following their importation, the Tempos remained under government ownership under official use, later sold to private owners.

=== Mexico ===
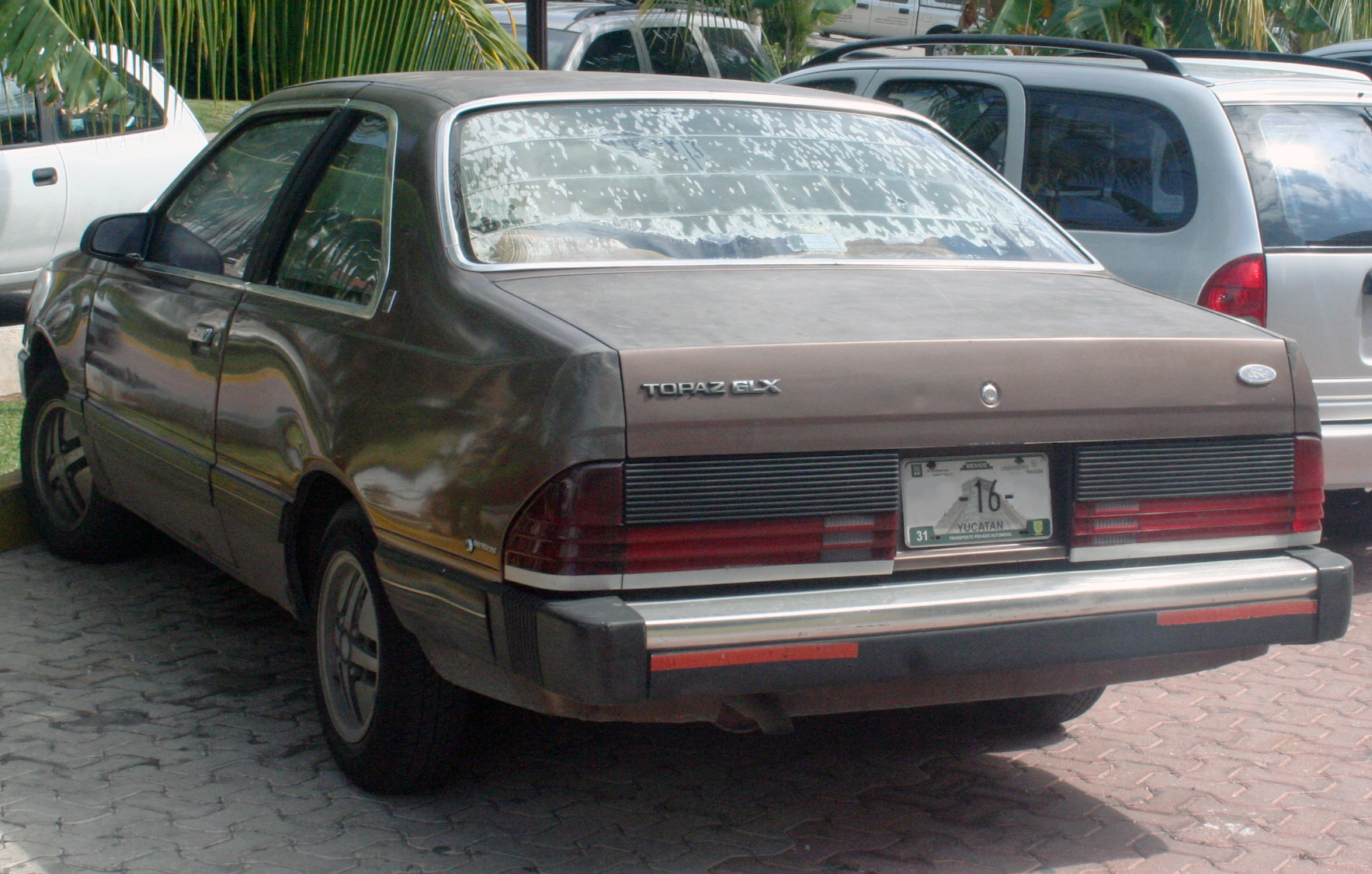
Ford Topaz GLX coupé; rear view

Ford assembled and sold two models based on the American Tempo in Mexico, the Ford Topaz and the Ford Ghia.

The cars were built in Ford's Cuautitlán Assembly plant. The lower level of automation at that plant translated into higher assembly costs, making a Mexican-built Ford Topaz retail for about US$400 more than a more well equipped US model with more effective pollution controls.

The first to hit the Mexican market was the Ford Topaz, debuting in 1984. This car was based on the American Tempo, and was offered in both two- and four-door sedan versions. Like the US model, the Ford Topaz was restyled in 1988.

The Ford Ghia debuted in 1991. Based on the American Mercury Topaz, this model was more luxuriously trimmed, based on the American Topaz LS. The Ghia was equipped with wood grain panel doors, power antenna, five-band stereo graphic equalizer, and 14" alloy wheels similar to BBS models used on the European Ford Fiesta or Volkswagen Golf GTi. A four-cylinder 2.3-liter engine was the only available option. For 1992, only a 3-speed automatic transmission and V6 engine were only available. Also, leather interior.

== T-Drive Tempo ==
In or around 1990, a modified Tempo was used as a rolling testbed for a new powertrain configuration that Ford called "T-Drive". This system used transverse inline engines with the drive for the transmission taken off the center of the crankshaft, rather than the end.

The test Tempo's original transverse straight four engine and transaxle were replaced with a transversely mounted DOHC straight-eight engine and a center-mounted longitudinal transaxle, making the Tempo Rear Wheel Drive. The T-Drive specification allowed for engines of 4, 6, and 8 cylinders of 2.0 L, 3.2 L, and 4.0 L respectively, and the Tempo received the largest engine. Power output was estimated to have been in the range of 215–225 hp (160–168 kW). It is possible that the Tempo was chosen as it could accommodate a drive shaft and rear differential, due to the availability of the AWD model. This 8 cylinder, RWD Tempo with independent rear suspension was shown briefly and never seen again.

In 1991, the T-Drive technology was unveiled to the public as part of two concept cars; the Contour sedan and the Mystique minivan. It did not go into production.
