= Ford ATX transmission =

ATX

Overview
- Manufacturer: Ford Motor Company
- Also called: FLC
- Production: 1981-1994

Body and chassis
- Class: 3-speed transverse automatic transaxle

Chronology
- Successor: F-4EAT; 4F27E

The FLC-"Fluid Link Converter"- ATX was a 3-speed hydraulic automatic transaxle produced by Ford Motor Company from 1981 through 1994, first appearing in the North American Ford Escort and Mercury Lynx, then later the European Escort in 1983. It was Ford's first automatic transmission developed for front wheel drive and transverse engine location. Used in the company's four-cylinder-powered cars ranging from the Escort to the Taurus. The 3.0-powered Tempo/Topaz used a beefed up version of the FLC as well. The transaxle did not have a lockup torque converter, or overdrive. It was controlled by a throttle or "kickdown" linkage, the speedometer drive used a mechanical cable, and had no computer controls.

With the four-cylinder Taurus excised from the lineup after 1991, and with the addition of the new computer-controlled, 4-speed F-4EAT from Mazda, for the Ford Escort/Mercury Tracer, the original FLC continued in production solely for the Tempo and Topaz until those cars were discontinued in 1994.

1	2	3	R
2.84:1	1.54:1	1.00:1	2.33:1

Applications:

- 1981-1987 Mercury Lynx
- 1981-1990 Ford Escort (North America)
- 1983-1990 Ford Escort (Europe) / Ford Orion
- 1982-1988 Ford EXP
- 1982-1983 Mercury LN7
- 1984-1994 Ford Tempo
- 1984-1994 Mercury Topaz
- 1986-1991 Ford Taurus
- 1990-1994 Ford Laser

== See also ==
- List of Ford transmissions
