= Lincoln Z =

Chinese mid-size luxury car

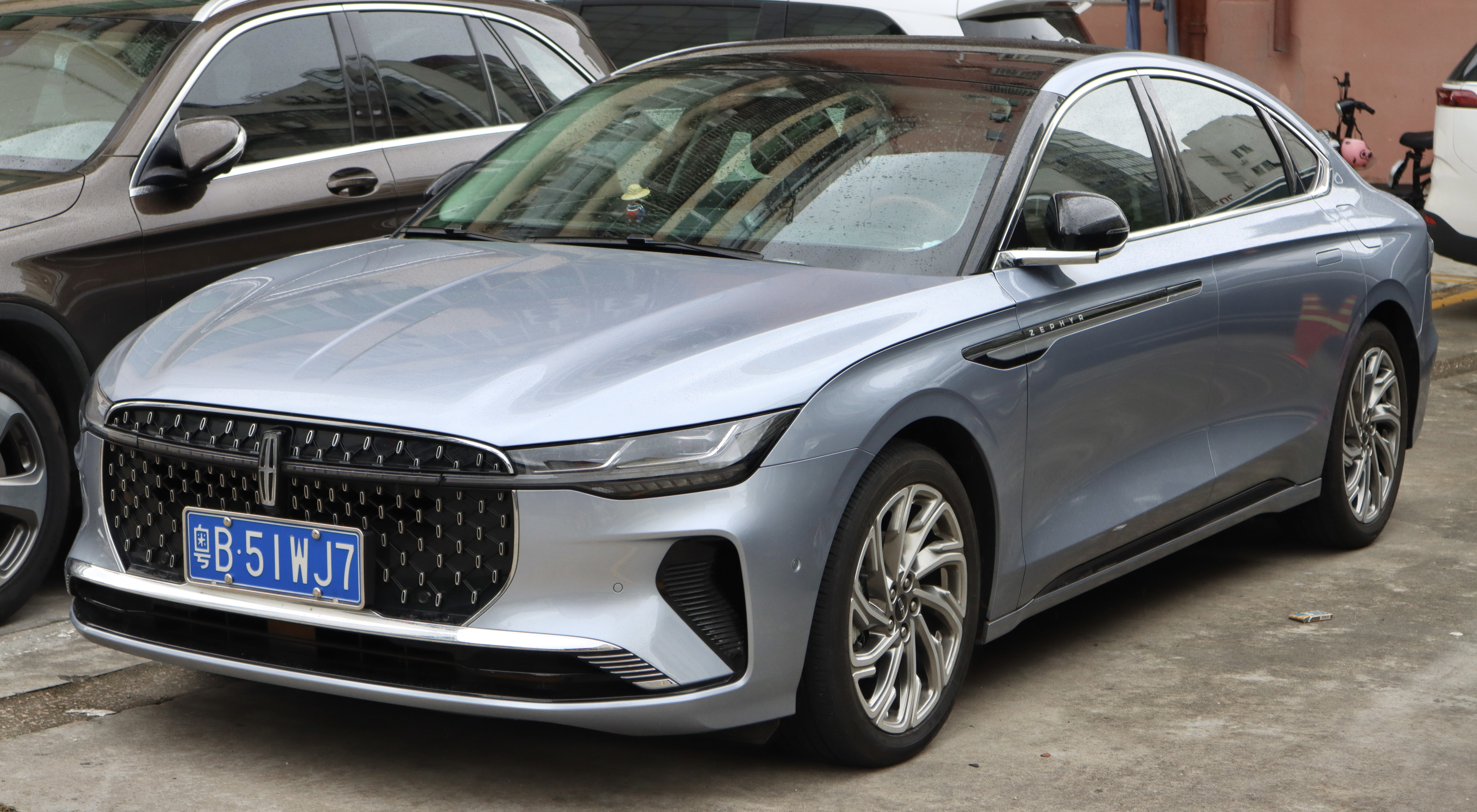

Overview
- Manufacturer: Lincoln
- Also called: Lincoln Zephyr (English name); Lincoln Z (Chinese name)
- Production: 2022–present
- Assembly: China: Chongqing (Changan Ford)
- Designer: Daniel Prochilo

Body and chassis
- Class: Executive car / Full-size car (E)
- Body style: 4-door sedan
- Layout: Transverse FF layout
- Platform: Ford C2
- Related: Ford Mondeo; Ford Mondeo Sport

Powertrain
- Engine: Gasoline: 2.0 L EcoBoost CAF488WQC turbo I4; Gasoline hybrid: 2.0 L CAF484WQH1 turbo I4
- Power output: 243 hp (181 kW; 246 PS)
- Transmission: 8-speed automatic; HF55 eCVT (hybrid)

Dimensions
- Wheelbase: 2,930 mm (115 in)
- Length: 4,982 mm (196.1 in)
- Width: 1,865 mm (73.4 in)
- Height: 1,485 mm (58.5 in)
- Curb weight: 2,054 kg (4,528 lb)

Chronology
- Predecessor: Lincoln MKZ (China); Lincoln Continental (China)

The Lincoln Z, previously known as the Lincoln Zephyr, is a mid-size luxury sedan produced since 2022 by Changan Ford, a joint venture between Chinese automaker Changan Automobile and American automaker Ford Motor Company, and sold by Lincoln Motor Company, a subsidiary of Ford.

== Overview ==
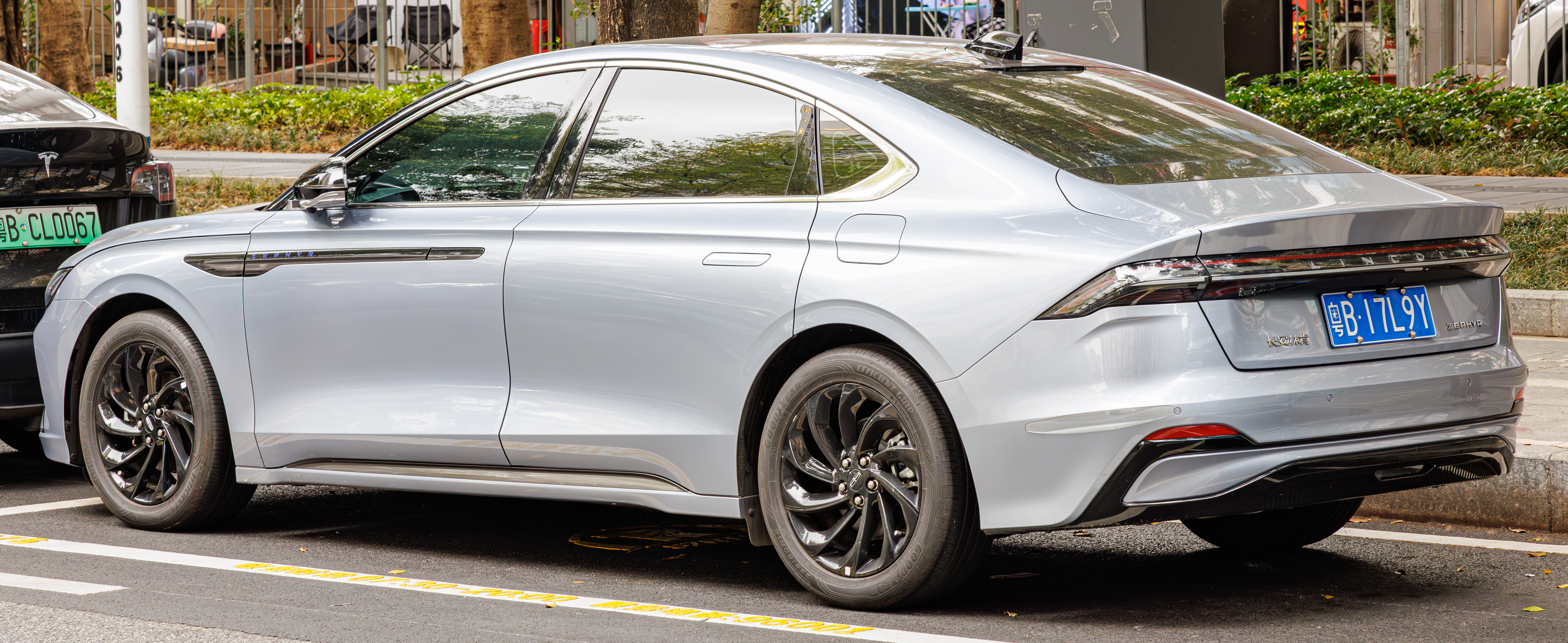
Lincoln Z rear

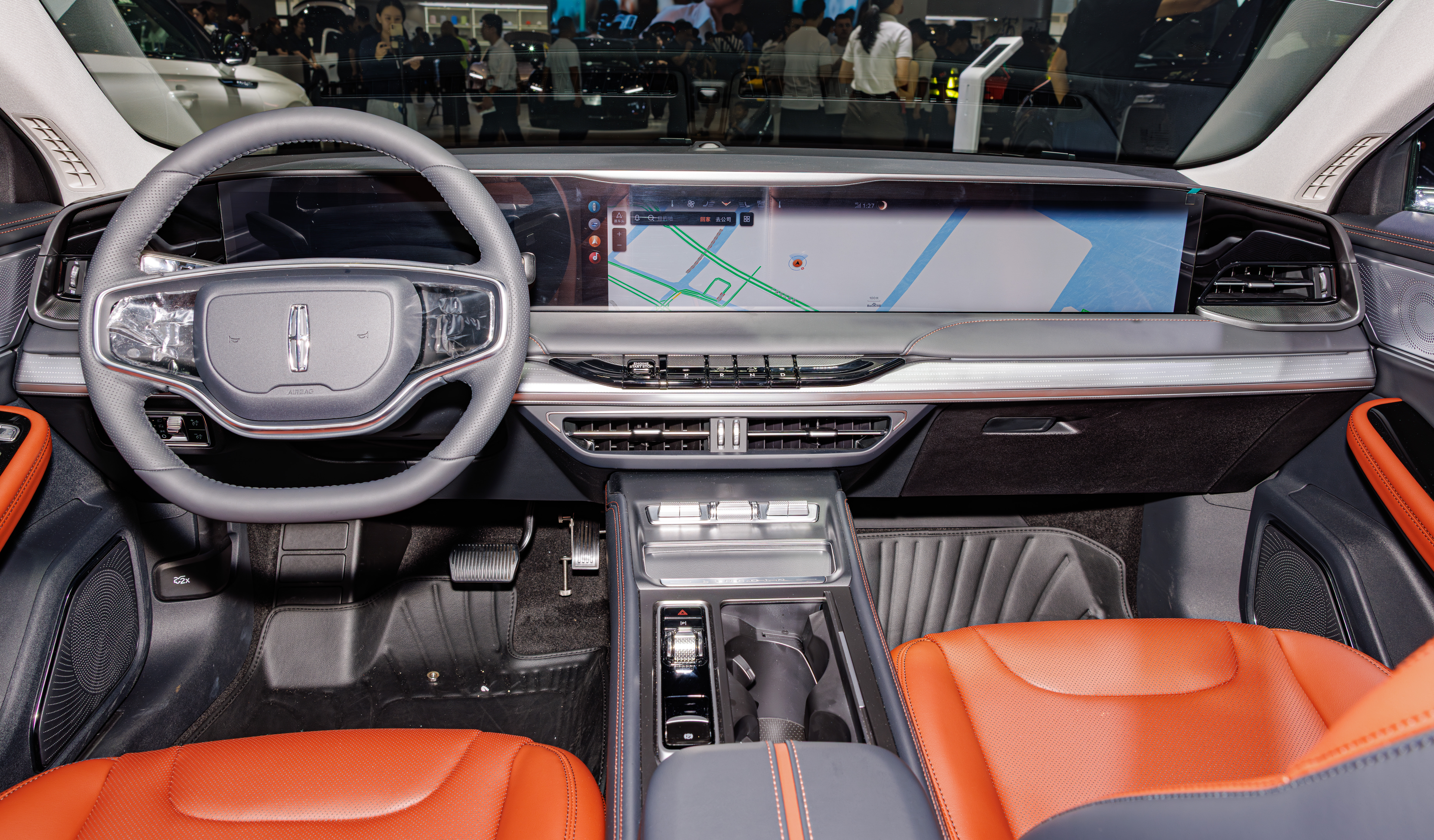
Interior

On April 21, 2021 at Auto Shanghai, Lincoln revealed the Zephyr Reflection Concept, which previewed an upcoming China-built vehicle designed to replace both the discontinued North American Lincoln MKZ and Lincoln Continental that were previously imported to the Chinese market. The production Chinese Lincoln Zephyr was revealed on November 19, 2021 at Auto Guangzhou.

The Lincoln Zephyr went on sale in China as the Lincoln Z in March 2022.

== Specifications ==
The Lincoln Z is powered by Changan Ford's CAF488WQC 2.0-liter turbocharged gasoline engine, with an output of 243 hp (181 kW; 246 PS) and 376 N⋅m (277 lb⋅ft) of torque, giving the car a top speed of 225 km/h (140 mph). The Z uses an 8-speed automatic transmission. Unlike other large discontinued Lincolns and Ford sedan in North America that were all-wheel drive, the Chinese-made Lincoln sedan powertrain wheels only available in front-wheel drive.

Early in 2024, the engine of the 2024MY Lincoln Z was upgraded to CAF484WQC1 to improve the vehicle's efficiency, and the Lincoln Z hybrid version equipped with the CAF484WQH1 engine and HF55 hybrid transmission were introduced.

== Sales ==
Calendar year	China
2022	14,062
2023	13,839
2024	12,400
2025	12,420
