= Ford Mondeo (fourth generation) =

Fourth generation of Ford Mondeo (2014–2022)

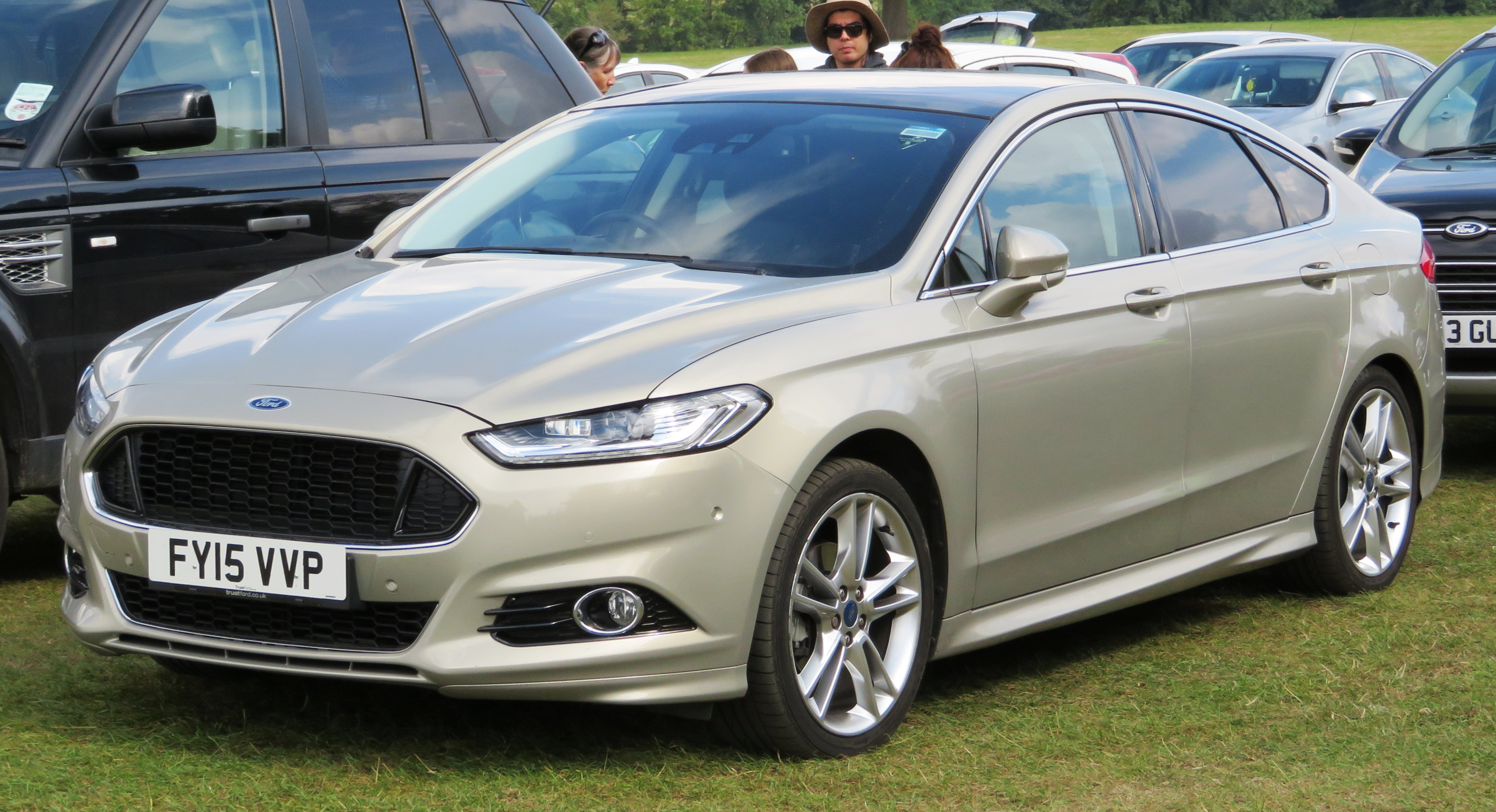

Overview
- Manufacturer: Ford
- Also called: Ford Fusion (Americas)
- Production: June 2013 – December 2021 (China); August 2014 – March 2022 (Spain)
- Model years: 2014–2022
- Assembly: Spain: Almussafes, Valencia (Valencia Body & Assembly); China: Chongqing (Changan Ford)
- Designer: Chris Hamilton, Kemal Curić, David Dillon

Body and chassis
- Class: Large family car
- Body style: 4-door saloon 5-door liftback 5-door estate
- Layout: Front engine, front-wheel-drive/four-wheel-drive
- Platform: Ford CD4 platform
- Related: Ford Fusion Energi; Ford S-Max; Ford Galaxy; Lincoln MKZ; Lincoln Continental; Ford Taurus (seventh generation)

Powertrain
- Engine: Petrol: 1.0 L EcoBoost I3; 1.5 L EcoBoost I4; 2.0 L EcoBoost I4; Petrol hybrid: 2.0 L Duratec I4; Diesel: 1.5 L Duratorq I4; 1.6 L Duratorq I4; 2.0 L Duratorq I4; 2.0 L EcoBlue I4; 2.0 L EcoBlue twin-turbo I4
- Transmission: 6-speed Durashift manual 6-speed 6F35 automatic 6-speed 6DCT450 dual-clutch 8-speed Ford 8F40 automatic

Dimensions
- Wheelbase: 2,850 mm (112.2 in)
- Length: 4,869 mm (191.7 in)
- Width: 1,852 mm (72.9 in)
- Height: 1,476 mm (58.1 in)
- Curb weight: 1,454–1,852 kg (3,206–4,083 lb)

Chronology
- Predecessor: Ford Mondeo (third generation); Ford Falcon (Australia)
- Successor: Ford Mondeo (fifth generation) (China)

The fourth generation of the Ford Mondeo, (Mk 5 in the UK, codenamed MD in Australia) is a range of mid-size cars produced by Ford from 2013 to 2022. Developed under the model code CD391, it is a rebadged variant of the American-market Fusion sold in Europe, Latin America, China and Australia. Revealed at the 2012 North American International Auto Show in Detroit, Michigan, the Mondeo is based on a new iteration of Ford's C/D platform, which it shares with the Galaxy and S-Max large MPVs. The Fusion had started production in 2012, which was about one year before the Mondeo had. At its launch, it served as the flagship model for Ford's lineup in China, and was tested on Chinese roads in 2013.

At the 2012 Paris Motor Show, Ford confirmed product details, and delayed the European launch from early summer 2013 to late autumn 2014 to address quality issues in ramping up production of the fourth-generation Mondeo receiving updates. It was later explained that European sales of the latest Mondeo would be delayed by "at least a year" because of the closure in 2013 of the Ford plant at Genk, which is where previous generations of the car had been produced for the European markets. In October 2014, the fourth-generation Mondeo finally appeared in Europe, manufactured in Valencia, powered by a range of four-cylinder engines.

The facelifted Mondeo was revealed on 18 January 2019 as a 2020 model, making its public debut at the Brussels Motor Show in Belgium. The Mondeo was discontinued in Australia in 2020. Ford had retired the Mondeo nameplate in Europe in March 2022 after 30 years of production. As of late 2023, the Mk5 Mondeo is exclusively sold in China and the Middle East, due to Ford Europe's decision to move towards the crossover SUV market.

== History of development ==
The Mondeo/Fusion was revealed on 9 January 2012 at the 2012 North American International Auto Show. Assistant vehicle line director for C/D vehicles Steve Pintar had stated that the clean-sheet architecture, of which the Mondeo is based on, is flexible enough to accommodate the brand's large passenger car and SUV when the Australian Falcon and Territory were replaced in 2016. With the Mondeo/Fusion based on the C/D platform's transverse engine and front-wheel-drive or all-wheel-drive configuration would mean the end of Ford Australia's straight-six longitudinal engine and rear-wheel-drive architecture of the Falcon and related Territory. "We haven't designed (the C/D platform) for a RWD configuration," Pintar stated. According to Pintar, the Mondeo/Fusion would initially be produced in Belgium, the US, Mexico, Russia and China, however the Mondeo was produced only in Spain and China, while the Fusion was produced only in North America. Darren Palmer had stated, "CD4 platform will eventually underpin 10 models, with an expected combined annual volume of 1.2 million."

Mike Rogers, Ford's Engineering Launch Manager, had played a significant role in the European market receiving the Mondeo. As the Mondeo was derived from the Fusion, Rogers and his team of developers had to integrate new petrol and diesel powertrains, two new body styles (liftback and station wagon), right-hand drive, and a completely restyled interior to differentiate it from its American sister model. Rogers and his team additionally had to switch from the now-closed Genk, Belgium plant to the assembly area in Valencia, Spain. Rogers had also stated that "because the car was developed initially as a global vehicle, Ford teams in North America, Europe and Asia were all involved in setting up the program." The Mondeo features an available 1.0-litre engine. While a 1.0 engine is unlikely for car of its size, Rogers and his team of engineers have promised an adequate level of noise, vibration, and harshness (NVH) and low CO_{2} emissions. The launch team was initially composed of 150 engineers at the Valencia assembly plant, however Rogers had emphasised that there was also backup if necessary from Ford's technology and engineering facilities in Cologne, Dunton, and Dearborn to ensure the car and each of its body styles (sedan, liftback and estate) would meet all criteria. In October 2012, Ford had announced that they would move production to the Valencia plant, following their announcement to shut the Genk plant down after 50 years and 14 million vehicles produced there. Rogers states that the move of plants "necessitated a very significant development and re-investment in the Valencia plant". The model was launched under the company's new "One Ford" strategy, which called for single models to be manufactured and sold globally to achieve efficiency and economies of scale, instead of making regional models.

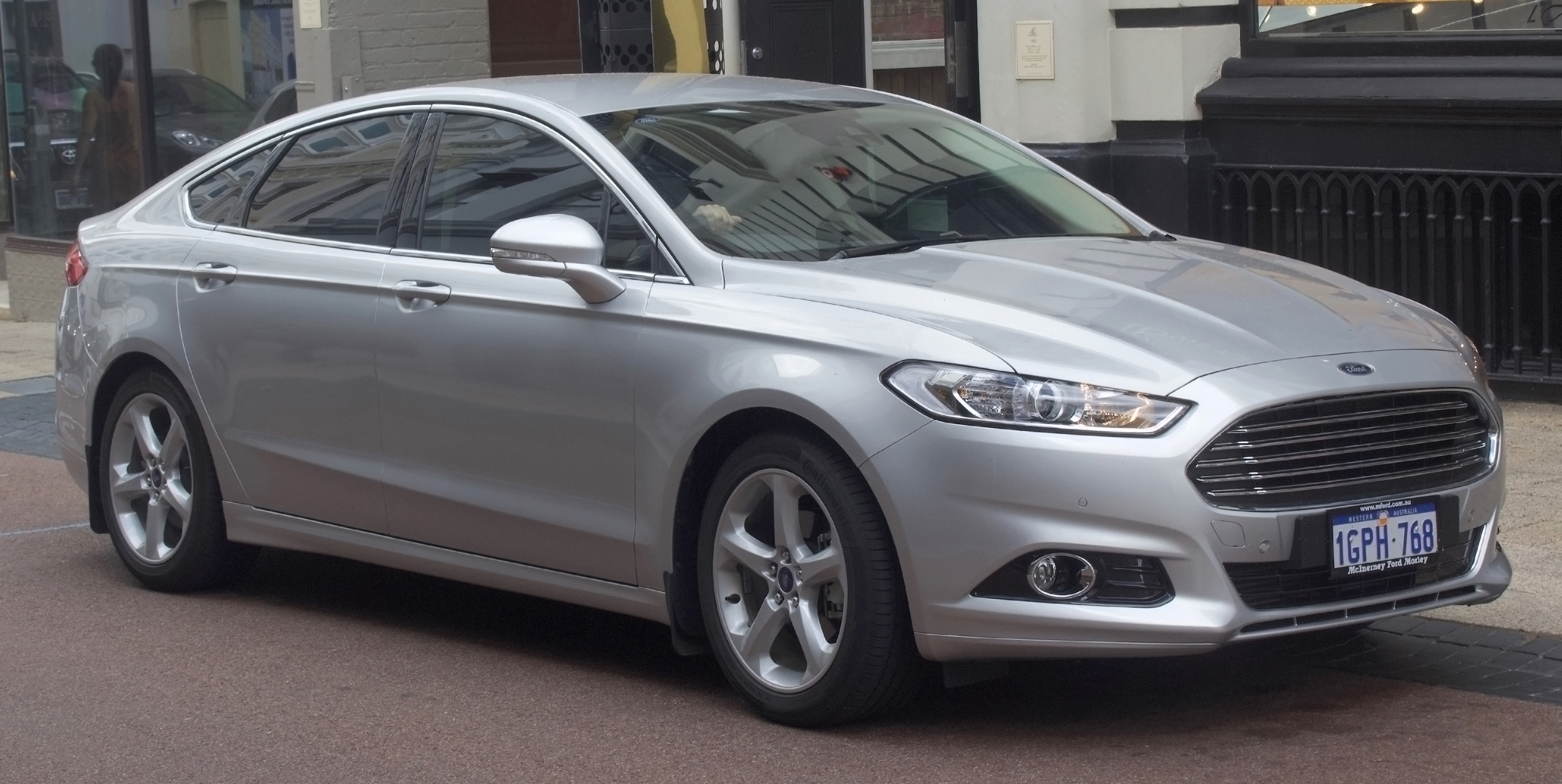
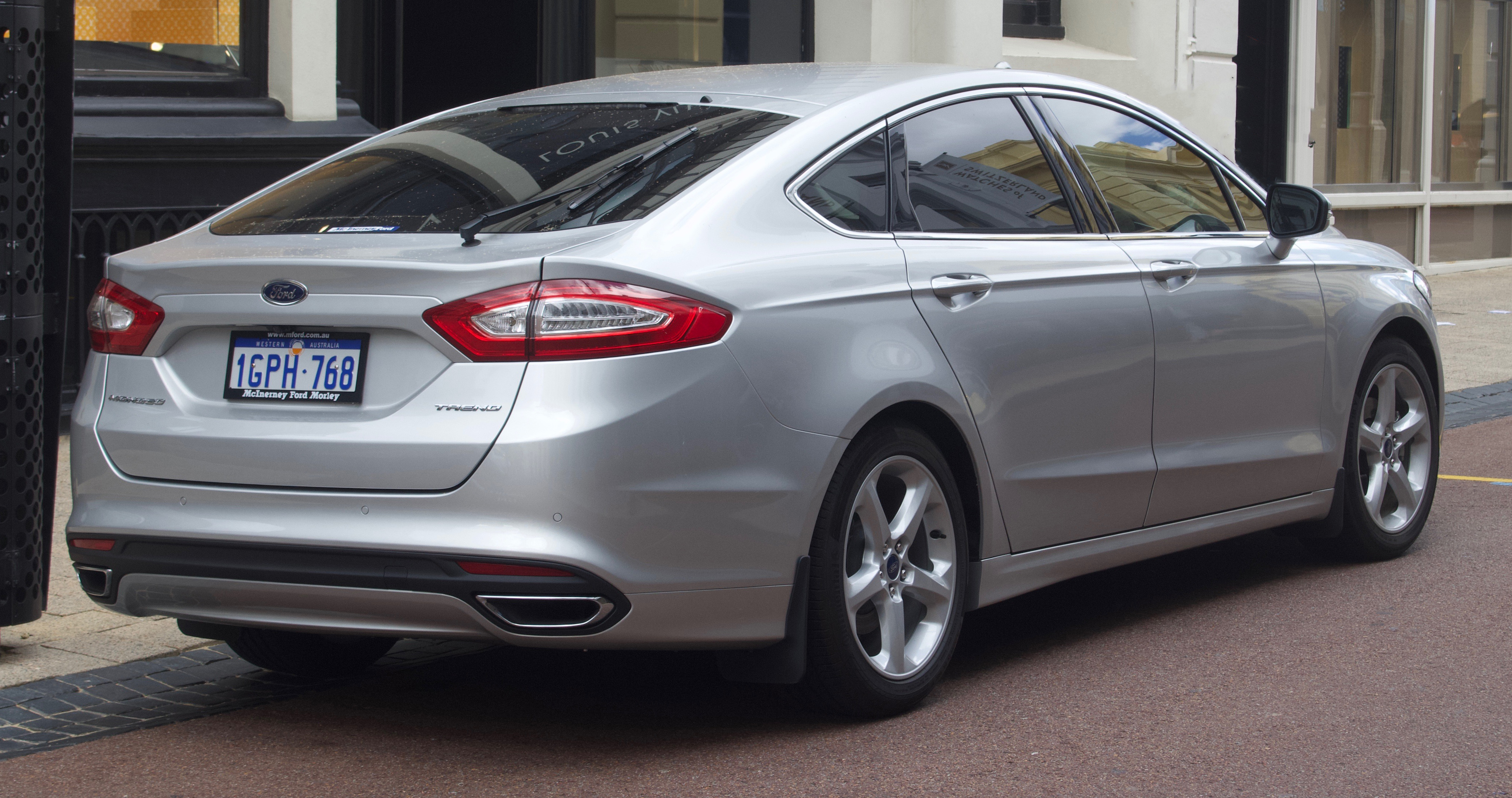
2018 Ford Mondeo Trend liftback (Australia)

As with the previous generation, the Mondeo incorporates Ford's Kinetic global design language, which is additionally featured on the Mk3 Focus and the Mk3 Escape/Kuga. The Mondeo was spied as a development mule in 2011, and had started production in June 2013 for China, while starting in August 2014 for Spain. Furthermore, the Mondeo was introduced to Australia and New Zealand in April 2015 and May 2015, respectively, while it was introduced to the Chinese vehicle market in August 2013. This model is 15 mm (0.59 in) longer, 34 mm (1.3 in) narrower, 24 mm (0.94 in) lower, and it retains its 2,850 mm (112 in) wheelbase.

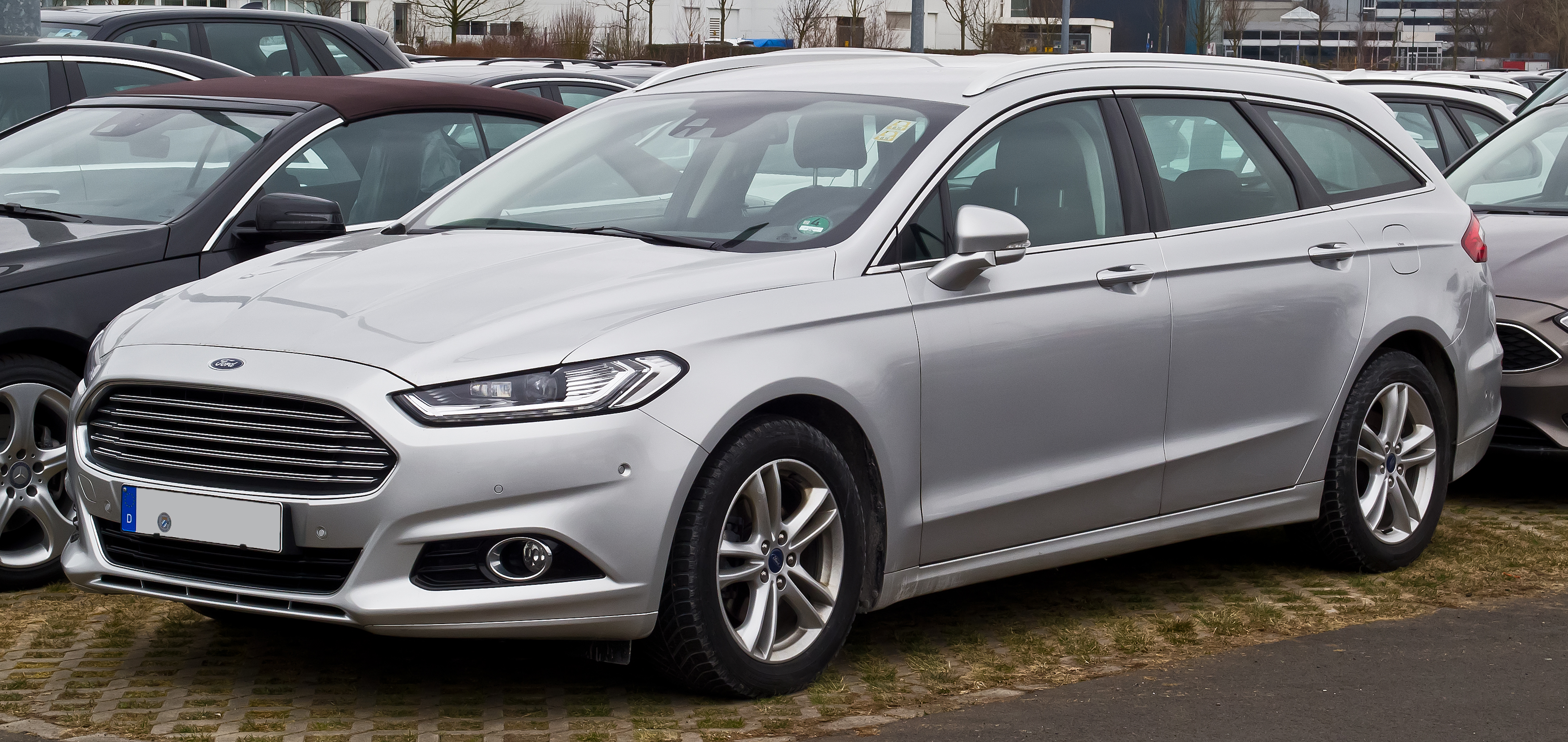
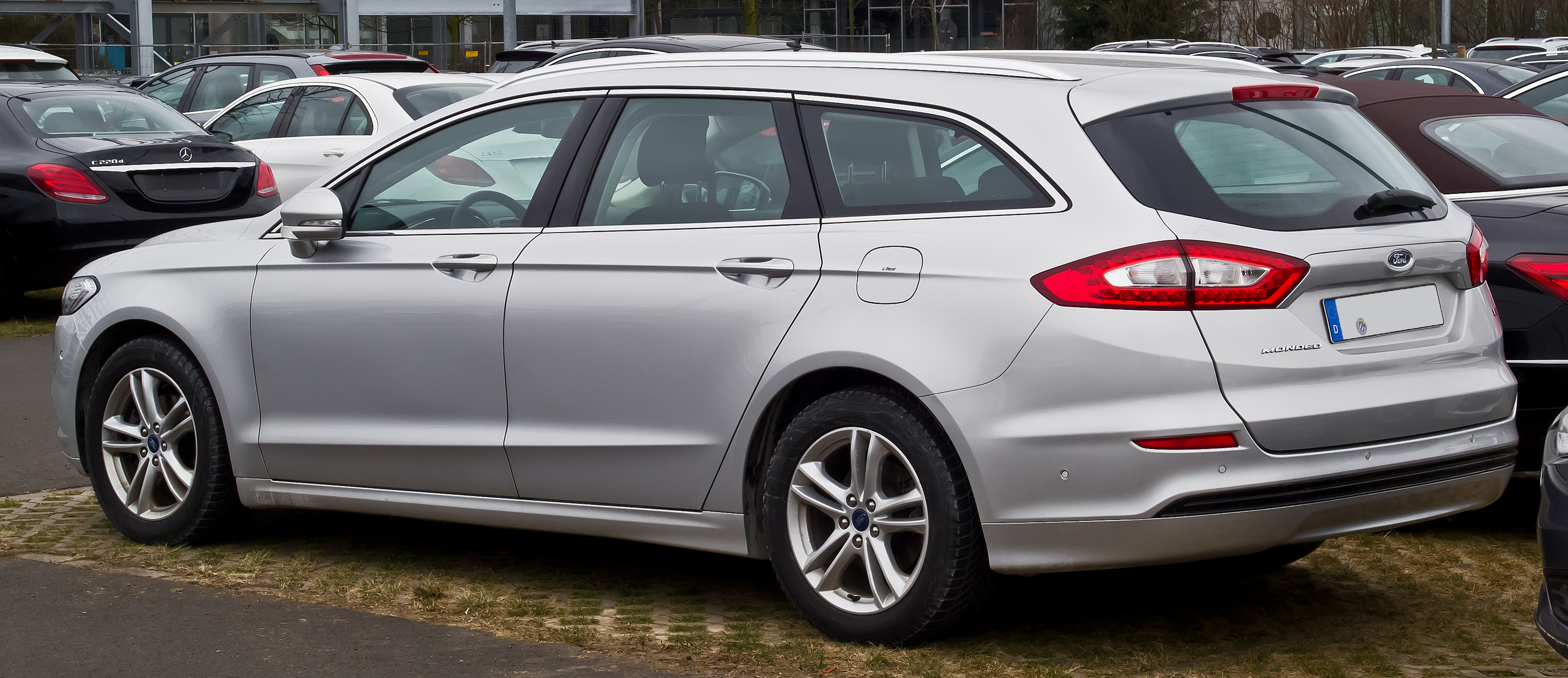
2016 Ford Mondeo Turnier estate (Germany)

According the brand, the Mondeo was the first automobile to benefit from hydro-formed high strength steel, with this steel being used for the A-pillars, B-pillars and roof rails. The hydro-forming uses high-pressure hydraulic fluid to press metal into more complex shapes, which was seen as more efficient than using traditional stamping methods, while providing improved strength-to-weight ratios and bending rigidity. About 61 per cent of the CD391 Mondeo's body structure consisted these high strength steels. Because of this, the Mondeo's overall body is 115 kg (254 lb) lighter than the previous model. The Mondeo's architecture features front MacPherson struts, while multi-link suspension at the rear, and additionally, the Mondeo features electric power steering. With the Mondeo's overall weight saving at only 25 kg (55 lb), Ford states that 90 kg (200 lb) has been put into improving safety, comfort and convenience. The model was designed by British Chief Exterior Designer Chris Hamilton, Bosnian-German designer Kemal Curić, and David Dillon. Hamilton was the designer of the vehicle's primary parts, which was designed to the tastes of Aston Martin's shape and body sculpting, while detailing was inspired by the concept Evos, which was revealed at Frankfurt Motor Show in 2011. Hamilton's design was said to incorporate significant engineering changes to the vehicle's platform, like a lower seating position to accommodate the low roofline, a lower boot floor for an appropriate amount of luggage, and narrower A-pillars to improve front visibility.

== Design and specifications ==
=== Bodywork ===
This model adds Ford's new integral link rear suspension configuration. Ford states the platform and body structure is 10 per cent stiffer, and additionally adds electric power-assisted steering for the first time. A torque-vectoring system is featured for better handling, and new anti-roll bars. This model features a revised lower grille design finished in gloss black, a newly styled Ford badge, countersunk into the nose of the car placed above the upper grille, a highly sculpted bonnet with a striking power dome, slimmer headlamps, lower roofline, side mirrors, which are aerodynamically optimised to maximise visibility, a new bumper fascia with a more pronounced lower lip spoiler, and two-piece wrap-around LED tail lamps. For the first time on a mid-size car, the Mondeo introduces sequentially-illuminated turn signals. Like the Fusion, the Mondeo's claimed drag coefficient is rated at 0.27 C_{d}.

=== Interior ===
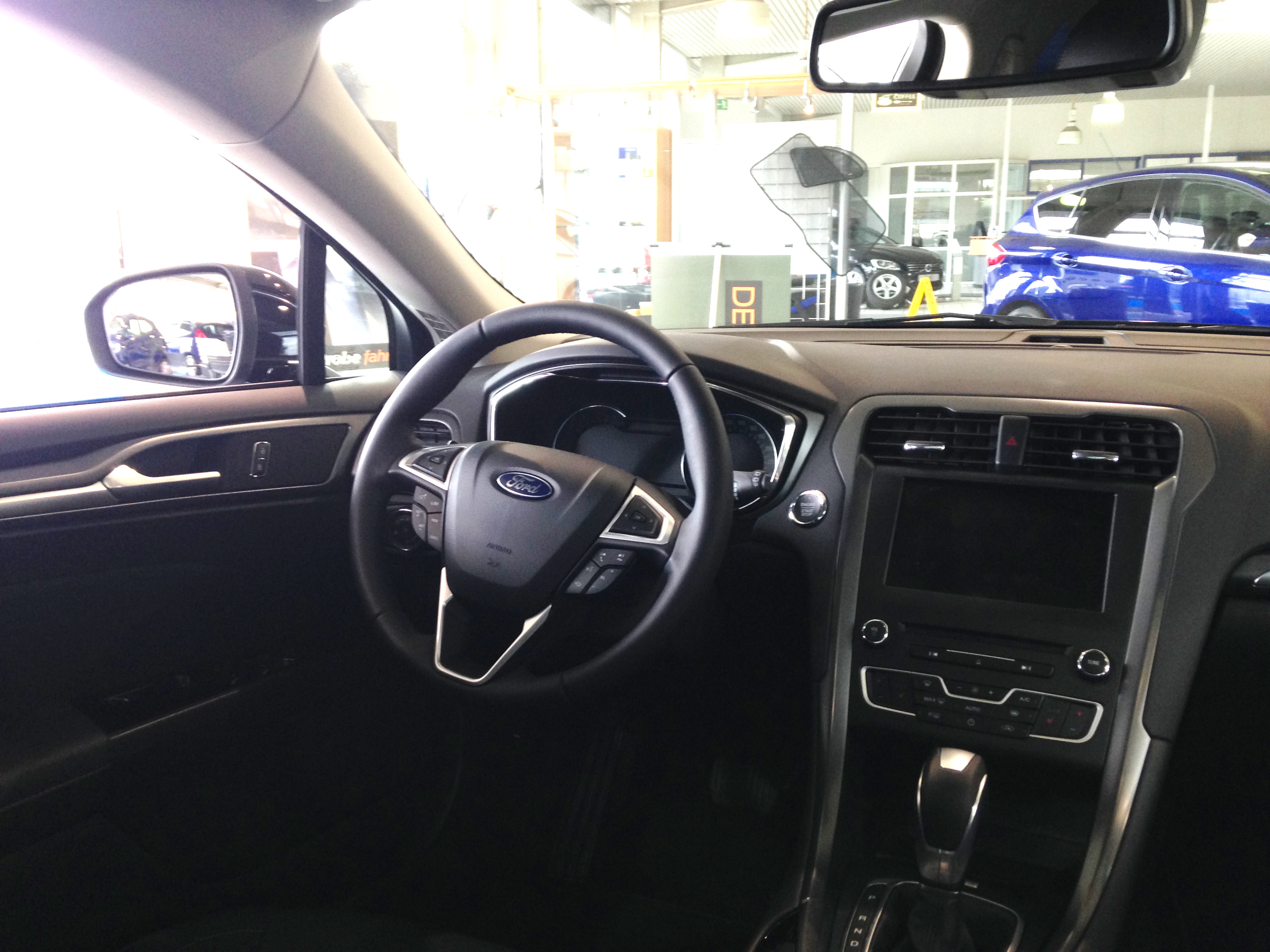
Interior (pre-facelift)

The liftback's boot stands at 541 litres (19.1 cu ft) with seats up, which expands to 1,437 litres (50.7 cu ft) with seats down. The station wagon and sedan model offer slightly less room at 500 litres (18 cu ft) with seats up, while the station wagon has a capacity of 1,605 litres (56.7 cu ft) with seats down, which is about 170 litres more than the liftback. The hybrid liftback model offers significantly less boot space than the base liftback at 383 litres (13.5 cu ft). Due to its battery pack, the hybrid's rear seats are not available to be folded. While the diesel Mondeos and the hybrid estate model feature a hatchback tailgate, the hybrid sedan's boot opening hinges from below the rear window. Because of this, it has a narrower boot opening than the liftback and estate versions, which makes it harder to fit larger objects. Mat Watson from British magazine carwow has stated that "quality is good but the infotainment can't match a VW Passat". The Mondeo's seats fold in a 60:40 split.

Initially, the SYNC2 infotainment setup was available, which had offered navigation, traffic alert, in-car climate controls were available, allowing the driver and passenger to select temperature and heated seat level, and an in-car Wi-Fi hotspot that was available by setup. The Ford SYNC3 infotainment system was fitted onto all Mondeo models after Q2 2017. This setup includes Apple CarPlay, Android Auto and Applink connectivity, meaning it allows smartphones can hook into it via the USB socket. It allows buyers to control the smartphone via the 8.0-inch touchscreen without having to pick the device up. The Vignale trim, available in specific countries, allows an active noise-cancelling technology system.

=== Safety equipment ===
Euro NCAP test results* 5-door LHD large family estate (2014)
Test	Points	%
Overall:	5 /5 stars	
Adult occupant:	33.0	81%
Child occupant:	40.5	82%
Pedestrian:	23.9	66%
Safety assist:	8.7	66%

Euro NCAP test results* 5-door LHD large family estate (2019)
Test	Points	%
Overall:	5 /5 stars	
Adult occupant:	36.8	96%
Child occupant:	43	87%
Pedestrian:	34	70%
Safety assist:	9.6	73%

The Mondeo has been rated as one of the safest family vehicles by European New Car Assessment Programme, receiving a maximum five-star rating. In 2014, the variant tested by Euro NCAP was a 1,634 kg (3,602 lb), 2.0-litre diesel "Trend" estate model. This model they had tested had featured driver, passenger, and rear airbags, belt pretensioners and load limiters for the driver and front passenger, knee airbags for the driver and rear, side head and chest airbags, as well as a seatbelt reminder. The facelifted model was tested in 2019, as a 1,852 kg (4,083 lb), 2.0-litre diesel "Titanium" estate model. This model featured front airbags for driver and passenger, belt load limiters and pretensioners for driver, passenger and rear, knee airbags for the driver, side head airbags for driver, passenger and rear, side chest airbags for driver and passenger, as well as a seatbelt reminder. Both models tested had received a five out of five-star rating. On the pre-facelift model, the Titanium trim level had offered active systems such as lane departure warning and traffic sign recognition, which would show the current speed limit on the digital display. With the facelift, these features are standard across the range, as well as a mandatory kit like tyre pressure monitors, cruise control, additional airbags, and electronic stability control. Front and rear parking sensors are also added to all models. Ford additionally adds an option pack which adds electronic hand control system on the shoulder. The Driver Assistance Pack adds an automatic parking aid that will autonomously park, blind spot monitors, and a rear-view camera. All models feature Ford's Auto Start-Stop system, which will automatically turn the engine off while the car is stationary to save fuel and reduce CO_{2} emissions.

ANCAP test results* Ford Mondeo all variants (2015)
Test	Score
Overall	5 /5 stars
Frontal offset	15.64/16
Side impact	15.43/16
Pole	2/2
Seat belt reminders	3/3
Whiplash protection	Good
Pedestrian protection	Adequate
Electronic stability control	Standard

== Models ==
=== United Kingdom ===
The Mondeo is available in six trim levels for the UK. The Style model features an 8-inch colour touchscreen, 16-inch alloy wheels, DAB radio, dual-zone climate control air-conditioning and cruise control. The Zetec model adds power-folding door mirrors, a heated front windscreen and height and lumbar adjustment for the driver's seat. Satellite navigation is available. The sporty ST-Line trim adds a sporty body kit, a black honeycomb grille, a black beltline positioned below the windows, and a choice of 18 or 19-inch alloys. The ST-Line model also features leather seats with red stitching, a leather steering wheel and black interior trims. Titanium models add 17-inch alloy wheels, sporty seats, standard satellite navigation, automatic headlights and wipers, as well as safety systems consisting of traffic-sign recognition and lane-keeping assistance. Active parking assistance is available. The Titanium X trim adds LED headlights, leather trim, electrically adjustable heated front seats, and tinted glass. Memory function for the steering wheel is available. Ford had introduced the Vignale, to compete with the Audi A4, BMW 3 Series, and the Mercedes-Benz C-Class. It features large alloy wheels, chrome door handles, a new grille, a redesigned front bumper and new fog lamps. Inside, it features quilted leather seats, luxurious floor mats and leather on the dashboard and steering wheel. The Mondeo is available in ten colours.

=== Australia ===
In Australia and New Zealand, the Mondeo is offered in three grades: the Ambiente, Trend and Titanium. The Mondeo is exclusively available in liftback and station wagon body styles. The Ambiente model features 17-inch alloy wheels, privacy glass, heated mirrors, front and rear parking sensors, 8-inch colour touchscreen, satellite navigation, and Bluetooth with audio streaming. Upgrading from the Ambiente model, the mid-range Trend model adds dual exhausts, automatically folding exterior mirrors, keyless entry and start, adaptive cruise control, memory driver seats, heated front seats, automatic headlamps and high beams, rain sensing wipers, multi-colour ambient lighting, rear-view camera, blind spot detection, and Pre-Collision Assist with Pedestrian Detection. Adding to both the Ambiente and the Trend models, the range-topping Titanium adds 18-inch alloy wheels, a body kit (front and rear side skirts), a power tailgate for the station wagon, adaptive suspension and adaptive LED headlamps, panoramic sunroof, an interior dedicated to sportiness, and a choice of eight vibrant exterior colours.

Due to its upcoming discontinuation in mid-2020 for the Australasian market, the Mondeo line-up for 2020 has been reduced to only the base Ambiente, with added active safety features from prior high-grade variants, and larger alloy wheels.

== Hybrid ==
Sales in Europe and Asia were planned to start in 2013. Ford began taking orders of the Mondeo Hybrid in Germany in August 2014. Production of the Mondeo Hybrid began at Ford's Valencia, Spain, plant in November 2014. The first hybrid Ford vehicle to be built and sold in Europe, the model features the same 1.4 kWh lithium-ion battery found in the Ford Fusion Hybrid. The Mondeo features a 2.0-litre Atkinson-cycle engine producing 143 PS (105 kW) and 173 N⋅m (128 lbf⋅ft), paired with a permanent-magnet AC synchronous electric motor developing 35 kW (47 hp), for an overall output of 187 PS (138 kW) and 300 N⋅m (220 lbf⋅ft). The Mondeo's regenerative braking recaptures wasted energy, used when brakes are applied, which it uses to charge the battery. 90 per cent of the which would have been lost during braking, is instead used to charge its battery. The electric system additionally features an engine-powered generator that sends energy back to battery. This allows the Mondeo to switch to electric power when efficiency is highly necessary.

The Hybrid model features an electronically controlled continuously variable transmission (eCVT). The model features Ford's SmartGauge system with EcoGuide, Ford's technology to assist the driver with driving efficiently. The high-quality LCD screen on the dashboard displays the Mondeo's real-time driving information, which includes fuel and battery power levels. Additionally, an on-screen animation lets the driver know when they're driving most efficiently. CO_{2} emissions and combined fuel economy are rated at 103g/km and 50.4mpg (49.6mpg for the estate) respectively. Sedan models offer a 383 litres (13.5 cu ft) boot, 133 litres (4.7 cu ft) smaller than the ICE models due to the battery pack, while estate models offer a 403 litres (14.2 cu ft), 97 litres (3.4 cu ft) smaller than the ICE model.

After its facelift, the only petrol Mondeo was exclusively available in a hybrid configuration. The hybrid estate Mondeo was also introduced in 2020.

== Drivetrain ==
Ford Mondeo specifications
Type	Engine type	Displacement	Power	Torque	Top speed	0–100 km/h (0–62 mph)	Transmission	Layout	CO_{2} emissions	Cal. years (Note: Based on Spanish production)
Petrol	Ecoboost	999 cc (1.0 L) I3 12v	92 kW (123 hp; 125 PS) @ 6,000 rpm	170 N⋅m (17.3 kg⋅m; 125 lb⋅ft) @ 1,400-4,500 rpm	200 km/h (120 mph)	12 sec	6-speed manual	FWD	119 g/km	
Petrol	Ecoboost	999 cc (1.0 L) I3 12v	92 kW (123 hp; 125 PS) @ 6,000 rpm	170 N⋅m (17.3 kg⋅m; 125 lb⋅ft) @ 1,400-4,500 rpm	200 km/h (120 mph)	12 sec	6-speed manual	FWD	119 g/km	2015–2018
Petrol	Ecoboost	1,498 cc (1.5 L) I4 16v	118 kW (158 hp; 160 PS) @ 6,000 rpm	240 N⋅m (24.5 kg⋅m; 177 lb⋅ft) @ 1,500-4,500 rpm	214 km/h (133 mph)	9.1 sec	6-speed manual 6-speed automatic	FWD	134-146 g/km	
Petrol	Ecoboost	1,498 cc (1.5 L) I4 16v	118 kW (158 hp; 160 PS) @ 6,000 rpm	240 N⋅m (24.5 kg⋅m; 177 lb⋅ft) @ 1,500-4,500 rpm	214 km/h (133 mph)	9.1 sec	6-speed manual 6-speed automatic	FWD	134-146 g/km	2014–2018
Petrol	Ecoboost	1,498 cc (1.5 L) I4 16v	121 kW (162 hp; 165 PS) @ 5,700 rpm	240 N⋅m (24.5 kg⋅m; 177 lb⋅ft) @ 1,600 rpm	222 km/h (138 mph)	9.2 sec	6-speed manual	FWD	150 g/km	
Petrol	Ecoboost	1,498 cc (1.5 L) I4 16v	121 kW (162 hp; 165 PS) @ 5,700 rpm	240 N⋅m (24.5 kg⋅m; 177 lb⋅ft) @ 1,600 rpm	222 km/h (138 mph)	9.2 sec	6-speed manual	FWD	150 g/km	2018
Petrol	Ecoboost	1,999 cc (2.0 L) I4 16v	177 kW (237 hp; 241 PS) @ 5,400 rpm	345 N⋅m (35.2 kg⋅m; 254 lb⋅ft) @ 2,300-4,900 rpm	240 km/h (150 mph)	7.4 sec	6-speed automatic	FWD	169 g/km	
Petrol	Ecoboost	1,999 cc (2.0 L) I4 16v	177 kW (237 hp; 241 PS) @ 5,400 rpm	345 N⋅m (35.2 kg⋅m; 254 lb⋅ft) @ 2,300-4,900 rpm	240 km/h (150 mph)	7.4 sec	6-speed automatic	FWD	169 g/km	2014–2018
Petrol hybrid	Duratec	1,999 cc (2.0 L) I4 16v	138 kW (185 hp; 188 PS) (combined)	300 N⋅m (30.6 kg⋅m; 221 lb⋅ft) (combined)	187 km/h (116 mph)	9.4 sec	eCVT	FWD	98-127 g/km	
Petrol hybrid	Duratec	1,999 cc (2.0 L) I4 16v	138 kW (185 hp; 188 PS) (combined)	300 N⋅m (30.6 kg⋅m; 221 lb⋅ft) (combined)	187 km/h (116 mph)	9.4 sec	eCVT	FWD	98-127 g/km	2014–2022
Diesel	Duratorq	1,560 cc (1.6 L) I4 8v	84 kW (113 hp; 114 PS) @ 3,600 rpm	285 N⋅m (29.1 kg⋅m; 210 lb⋅ft) @ 1,750-2,500 rpm	N/A	N/A	6-speed manual	FWD	114 g/km	
Diesel	Duratorq	1,560 cc (1.6 L) I4 8v	84 kW (113 hp; 114 PS) @ 3,600 rpm	285 N⋅m (29.1 kg⋅m; 210 lb⋅ft) @ 1,750-2,500 rpm	N/A	N/A	6-speed manual	FWD	114 g/km	2014–2015
Diesel	Duratorq	1,498 cc (1.5 L) I4 8v	88 kW (118 hp; 120 PS) @ 3,600 rpm	270 N⋅m (27.5 kg⋅m; 199 lb⋅ft) @ 1,750-2,500 rpm	192 km/h (119 mph)	11.5 sec	6-speed manual	FWD	104 g/km	
Diesel	Duratorq	1,498 cc (1.5 L) I4 8v	88 kW (118 hp; 120 PS) @ 3,600 rpm	270 N⋅m (27.5 kg⋅m; 199 lb⋅ft) @ 1,750-2,500 rpm	192 km/h (119 mph)	11.5 sec	6-speed manual	FWD	104 g/km	2015–2018
Diesel	Duratorq	1,997 cc (2.0 L) I4 16v	110 kW (148 hp; 150 PS) @ 3,500 rpm	350 N⋅m (35.7 kg⋅m; 258 lb⋅ft) @ 2,000-2,500 rpm	215 km/h (134 mph)	9.3 sec (FWD; m.); 10.3 sec (AWD; m.); 9.9 sec (FWD; a.)	6-speed manual 6-speed automatic	FWD; AWD	115-125 g/km	
Diesel	Duratorq	1,997 cc (2.0 L) I4 16v	110 kW (148 hp; 150 PS) @ 3,500 rpm	350 N⋅m (35.7 kg⋅m; 258 lb⋅ft) @ 2,000-2,500 rpm	215 km/h (134 mph)	9.3 sec (FWD; m.); 10.3 sec (AWD; m.); 9.9 sec (FWD; a.)	6-speed manual 6-speed automatic	FWD; AWD	115-125 g/km	2014–2018
Diesel	Duratorq	1,997 cc (2.0 L) I4 16v	132 kW (177 hp; 179 PS) @ 3,500 rpm	400 N⋅m (40.8 kg⋅m; 295 lb⋅ft) @ 2,000-2,500 rpm	225 km/h (140 mph)	8.3 sec (FWD; m.); 8.6 sec (FWD; a.); 9.3 sec (AWD; a.)	6-speed manual 6-speed automatic	FWD; AWD	107-124 g/km	
Diesel	Duratorq	1,997 cc (2.0 L) I4 16v	132 kW (177 hp; 179 PS) @ 3,500 rpm	400 N⋅m (40.8 kg⋅m; 295 lb⋅ft) @ 2,000-2,500 rpm	225 km/h (140 mph)	8.3 sec (FWD; m.); 8.6 sec (FWD; a.); 9.3 sec (AWD; a.)	6-speed manual 6-speed automatic	FWD; AWD	107-124 g/km	2015–2018
Diesel	Duratorq	1,997 cc (2.0 L) I4 twin-turbo 16v	154 kW (207 hp; 209 PS) @ 3,750 rpm	450 N⋅m (45.9 kg⋅m; 332 lb⋅ft) @ 2,000-2,500 rpm	215 km/h (134 mph)	8.1 sec	6-speed automatic	FWD	134 g/km	
Diesel	Duratorq	1,997 cc (2.0 L) I4 twin-turbo 16v	154 kW (207 hp; 209 PS) @ 3,750 rpm	450 N⋅m (45.9 kg⋅m; 332 lb⋅ft) @ 2,000-2,500 rpm	215 km/h (134 mph)	8.1 sec	6-speed automatic	FWD	134 g/km	2019–2022
Diesel	EcoBlue	1,997 cc (2.0 L) I4 16v	142 kW (190 hp; 193 PS) @ 3,500 rpm	400 N⋅m (40.8 kg⋅m; 295 lb⋅ft) @ 2,000-3,000 rpm	223 km/h (139 mph)	8.9 sec	8-speed sequential automatic	FWD	130-133 g/km	
Diesel	EcoBlue	1,997 cc (2.0 L) I4 16v	142 kW (190 hp; 193 PS) @ 3,500 rpm	400 N⋅m (40.8 kg⋅m; 295 lb⋅ft) @ 2,000-3,000 rpm	223 km/h (139 mph)	8.9 sec	8-speed sequential automatic	FWD	130-133 g/km	2019–2022
Diesel	EcoBlue	1,997 cc (2.0 L) I4 16v	110 kW (148 hp; 150 PS) @ 3,500 rpm	370 N⋅m (37.7 kg⋅m; 273 lb⋅ft) @ 2,000 rpm	215 km/h (134 mph)	9.7 sec	6-speed manual 8-speed sequential automatic	FWD	120-130 g/km	
Diesel	EcoBlue	1,997 cc (2.0 L) I4 16v	110 kW (148 hp; 150 PS) @ 3,500 rpm	370 N⋅m (37.7 kg⋅m; 273 lb⋅ft) @ 2,000 rpm	215 km/h (134 mph)	9.7 sec	6-speed manual 8-speed sequential automatic	FWD	120-130 g/km	2019–2022

== Facelifts ==
=== China ===
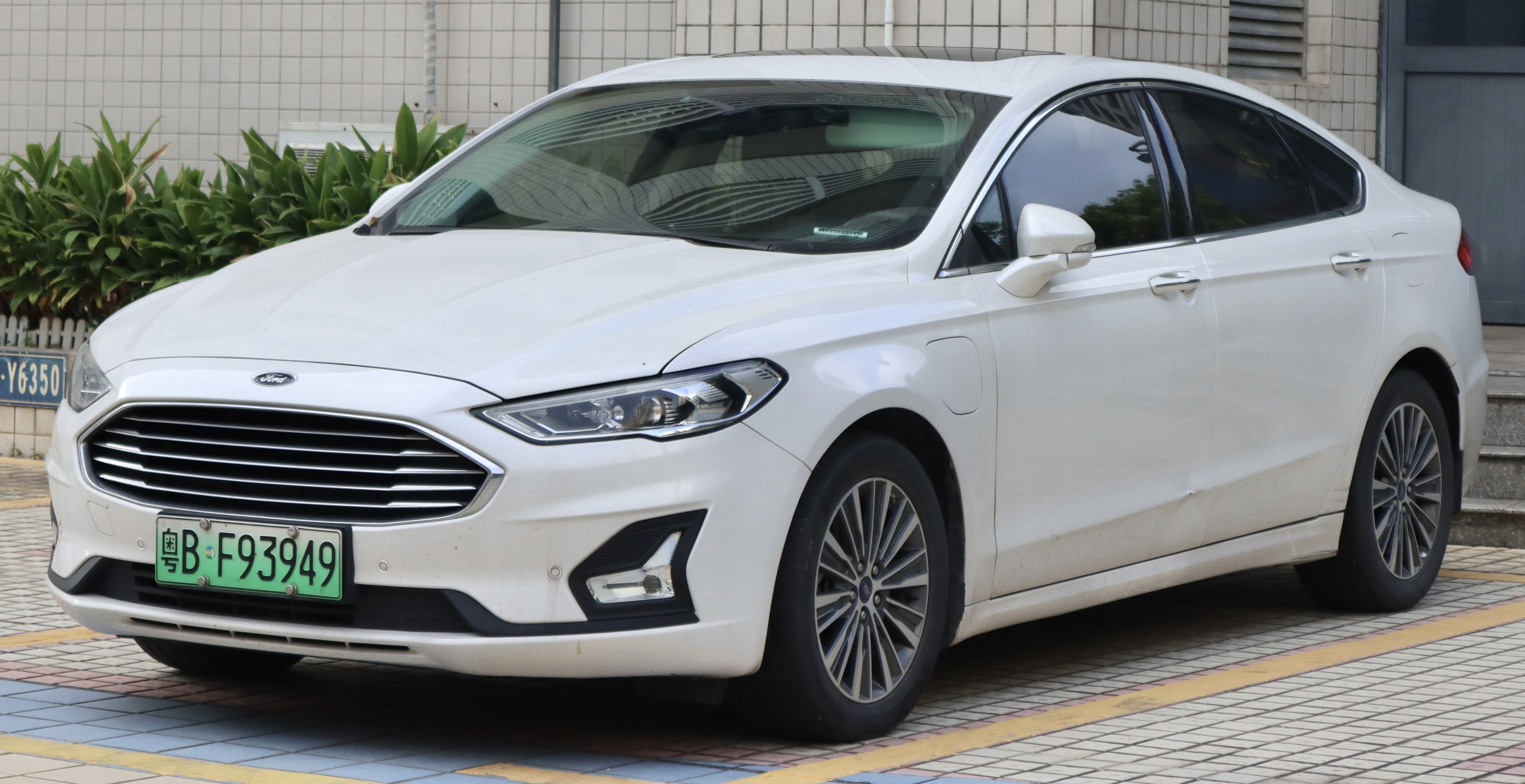
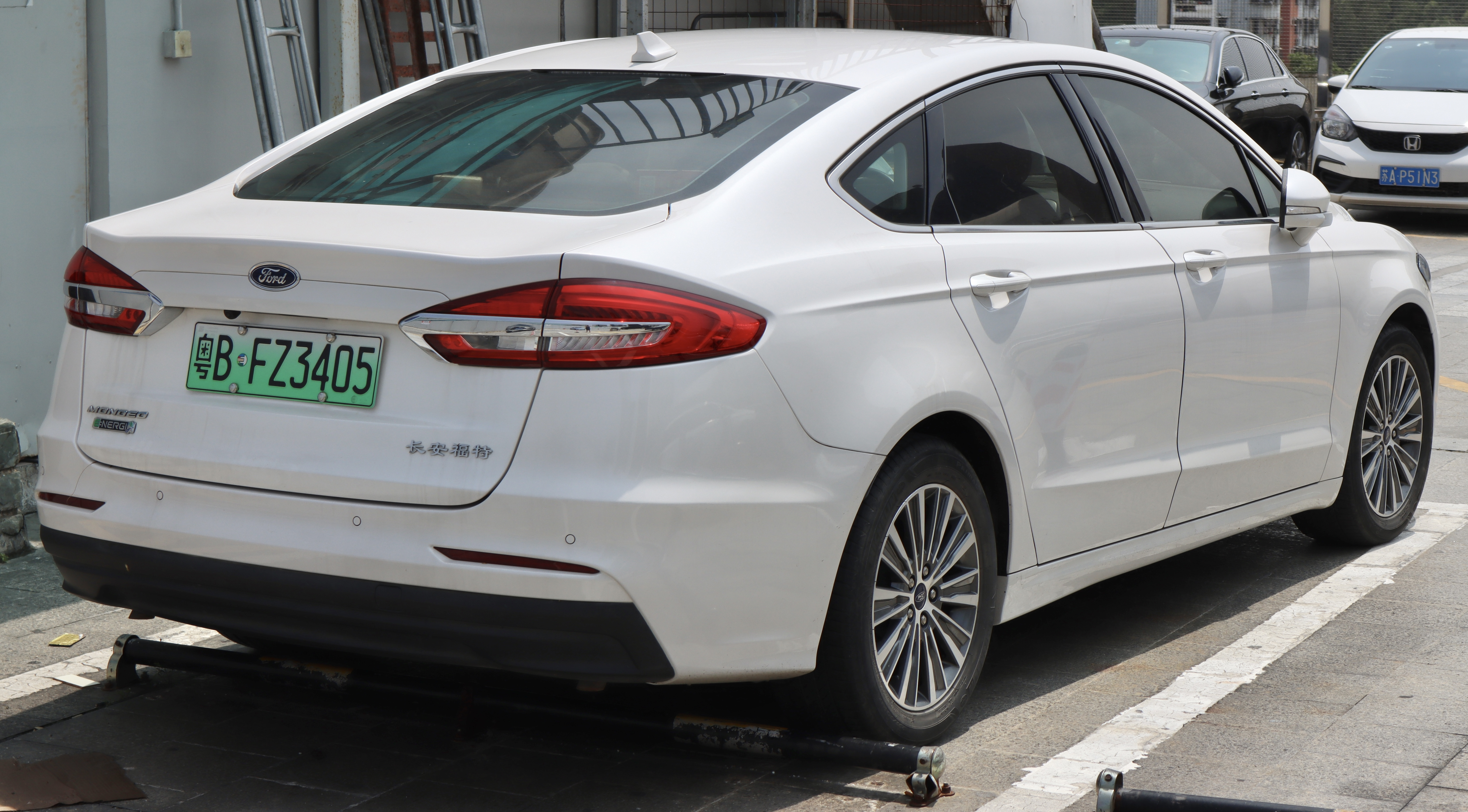
Facelift Chang'an Mondeo

In 2016, Ford had previewed some of the facelifted Mondeo's exterior and interior for the 2017 model year. The facelift's exterior is identical to the facelifted Fusion, meaning it features a 6-point grille, restyled LED headlamps and taillamps, as well as a revised front bumper. The side profile remains the same. Additionally, the Chinese-market facelifted Mondeo adds Ford's SYNC 3 infotainment system with Android Auto and Apple CarPlay compatibility. This model was later discontinued for China in 2021, due to the fifth generation model releasing exclusively for the market.

=== Europe ===
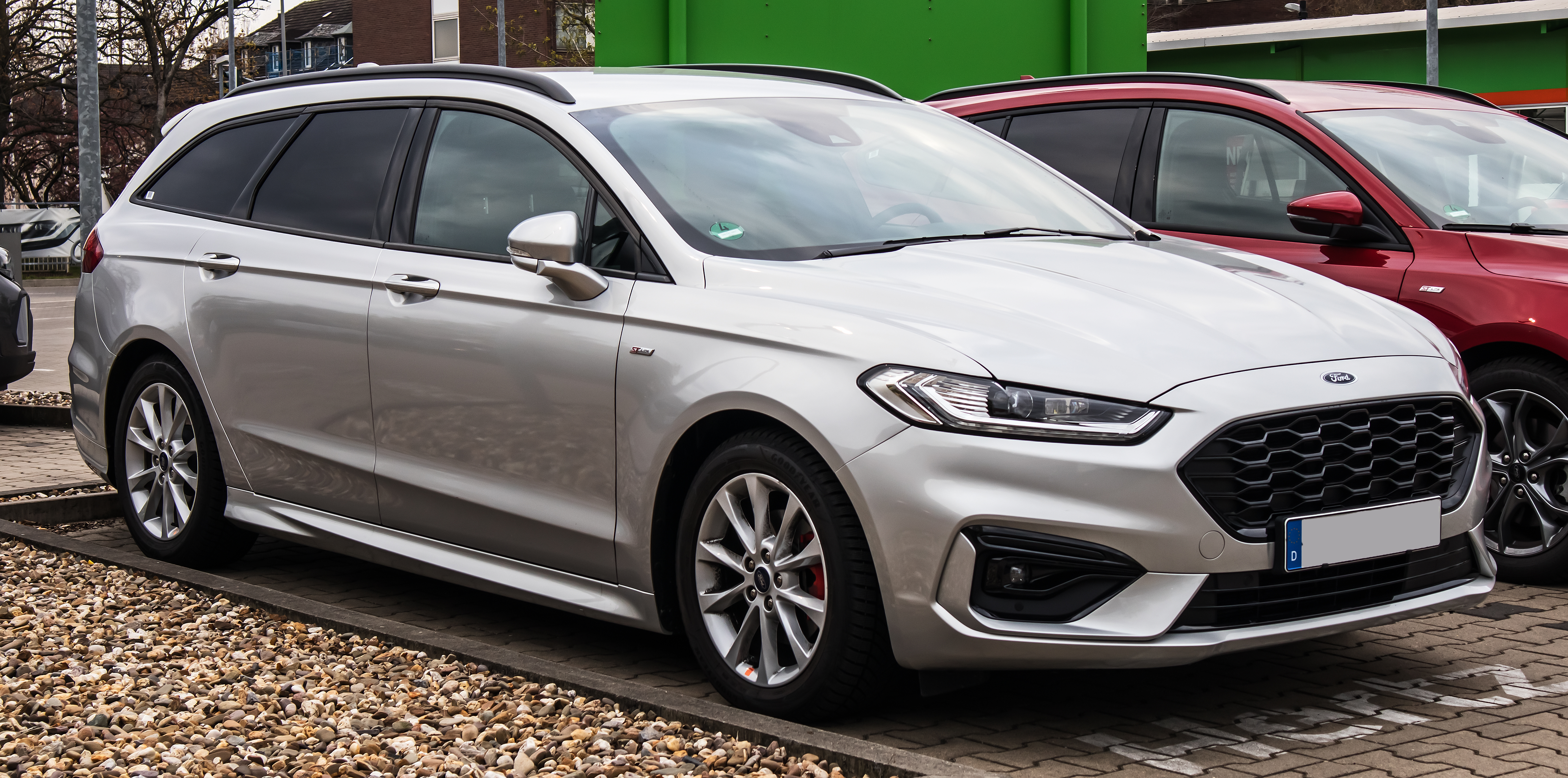
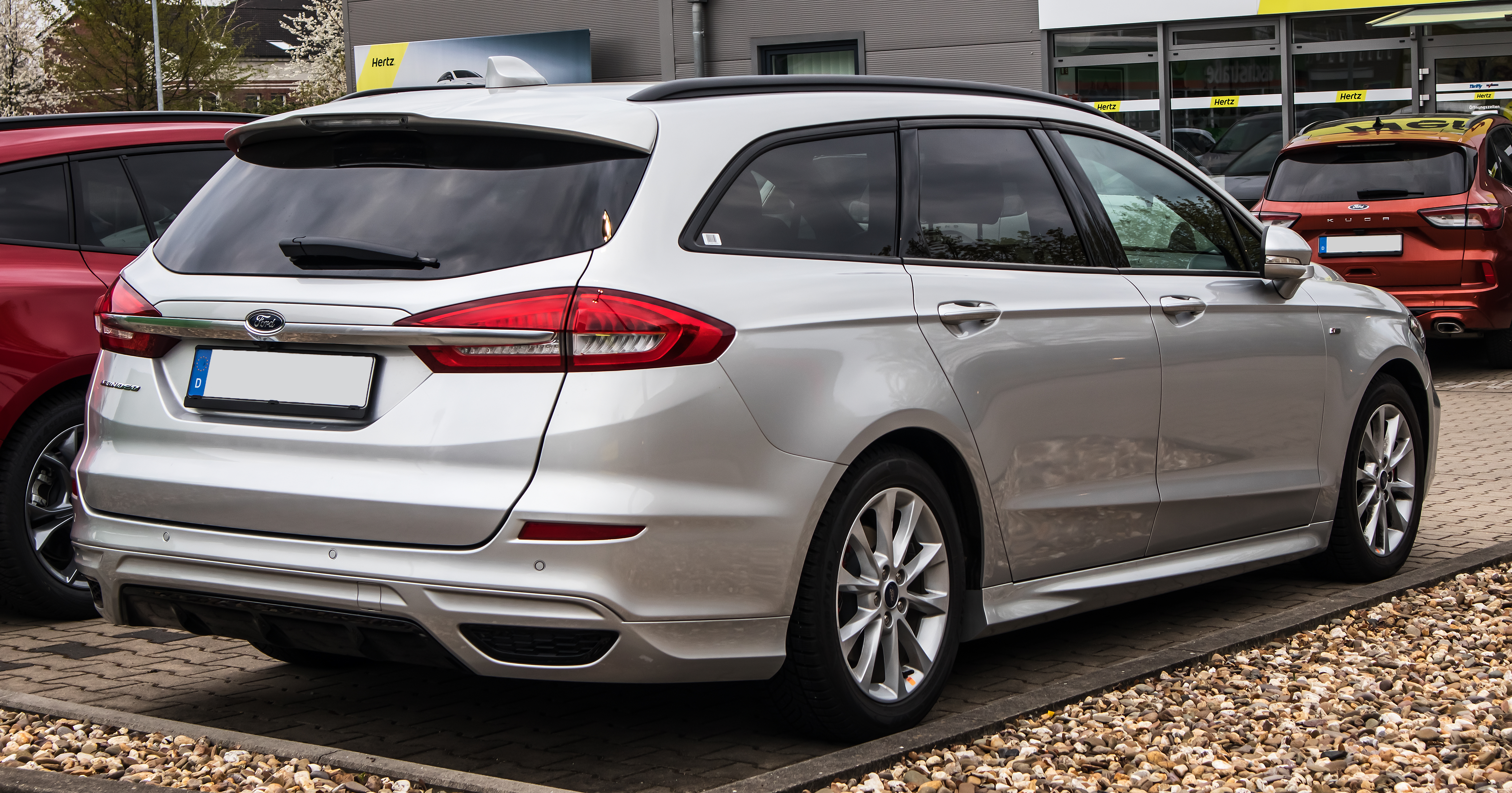
Facelift Mondeo Turnier ST-Line (estate)

The facelifted Mondeo was revealed on 18 January 2019 as a 2020 model, making its public debut at the Brussels Motor Show in Belgium. Along with a slightly reshaped and deeper grille, all models receive a revised front bumper, which visually joins the lower air intake and fog light pods for a sportier exterior look. Depending on the trim, the Mondeo adds new grille inserts and alloy wheel designs. All body styles receive a chrome bar linking and bisecting the pair of taillamps. The Mondeo now features the company's in-house developed 8-speed sequential automatic transmission, known as the Ford 8F40. Unlike the Fusion, the Mondeo retains its headlight design from the previous model. Now, the Mondeo features adaptive cruise control with a start-stop system functionality, as well as a traffic sign reader system. Ford has dropped conventional petrol models from the lineup, leaving the full-hybrid model as its only gasoline model. Ford had introduced a hybrid variant of the estate model to expand the Mondeo's lineup, brand was expecting these models to account for about 50 per cent of its sales. Ford has also introduced their EcoBlue engines onto their Mondeos, allowing for 150 PS (110 kW), 190 PS (140 kW), and 210 PS (154 kW) configurations. The model went on sale for the European market in March 2019, and was planned to come to Australia in the second half of 2020, however these plans were cancelled due to the discontinuation of the Ford Mondeo in 2020.

== Reviews and faults ==
=== Reception ===
The Mondeo had received primarily positive reviews, praising its driving experience, exterior, interior design, with some sources comparing it to luxury vehicles such as the Audi A4 and BMW 3 Series. Mat Watson from British magazine Carwow states that the Mondeo is "good to drive and cheap to run" and is additionally "a great purchase". Watson also states that "the Mondeo is a very practical car, and whether you're carting around kids or carpet samples, it'll do the job", and he additionally recommends the 2.0-litre diesel for its driving experience, while advising going for the 1.5-litre diesel for its relatively high fuel economy of 70.6mpg. Australian magazine Which Car? rates the Mondeo an 8.8 out of 10 score, praising its good handling, comfort, value, and space, while criticizing its interior finish and the significant use of petrol. Which Car? states that the mid-sized Ford Mondeo steers very nicely, rides very comfortably, and makes a superbly accomplished touring car. British magazine Top Gear rates the a six out of ten score, rivaling it with the Vauxhall Insignia, Mazda6, and the Volkswagen Passat, which all have a similar rating. Top Gear states that the Mondeo "looks a bit like the old one but brings solid gains in comfort and tech." They additionally state that the Mondeo is "very well insulated from big and small bumps, and the tyres' passage is quiet." Pete Gibson from British magazine Auto Express states "I'm a bit disappointed with some of the build quality, too. The parcel shelf, for example, is already broken – poor on a car of this price." They also state that "while the panoramic roof makes the cabin feel wonderfully airy, it also means so much light streams in that the touchscreen displays every single fingermark. It's horribly unsightly.". Auto Express rates the Mondeo a three out of five stars.

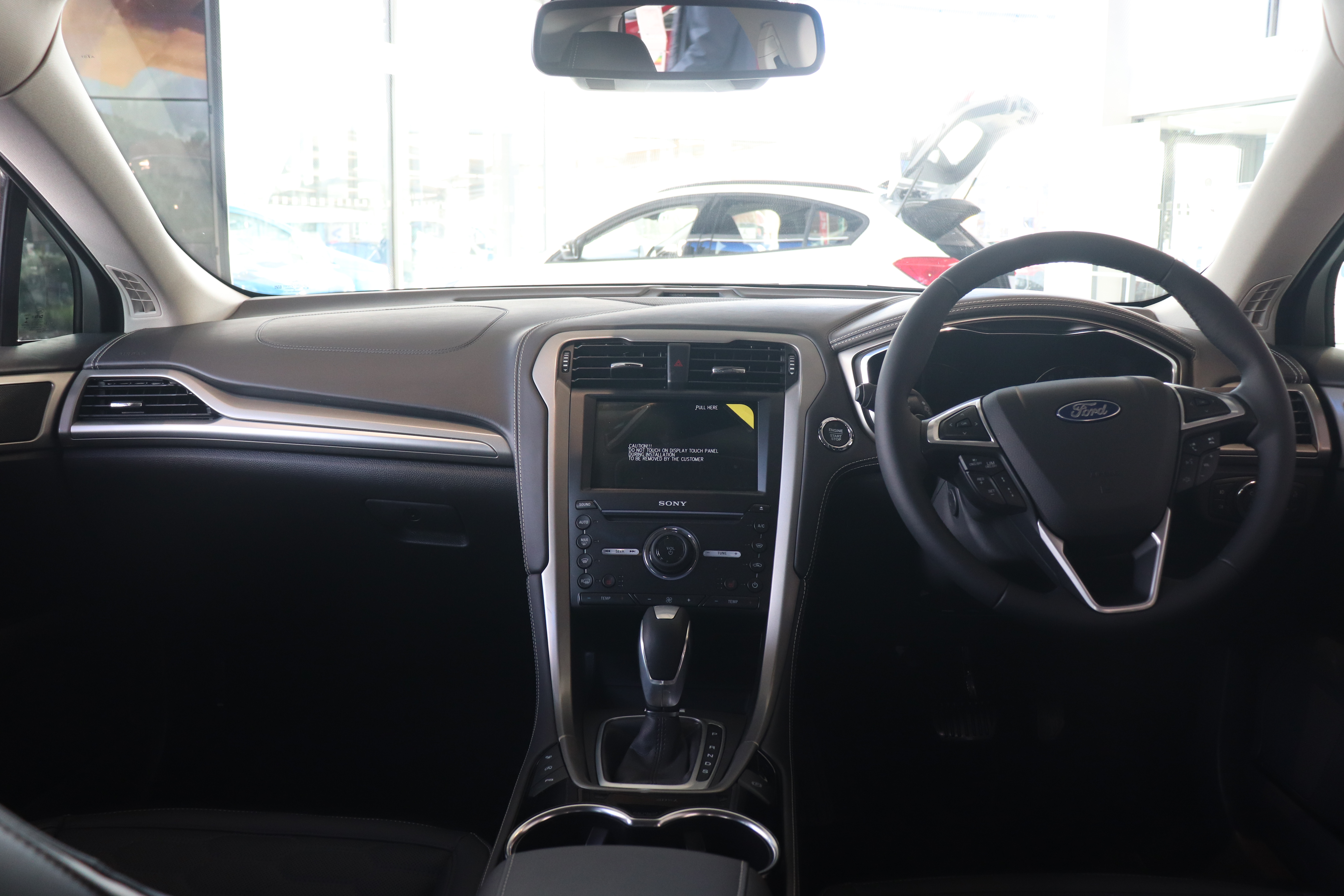
Facelifted Mondeo interior pictured. The Mondeo's interior has been positively criticised since its launch.

=== Recalls ===
In October 2016, a recall was issued for Mondeos manufactured between 16 October 2014 to 22 December 2015. This was because of an error in the Headlight Control Module, which could possibly cause vehicles with Adaptive LED headlamps to experience an incident which would cause the headlamps to abruptly switch off. If this had happened, the ignition would have to be cycled on and off to enable the headlamps to reactivate. In Australia, 582 units were affected, while in the United Kingdom, 9,705 vehicles were affected. In October 2018, a recall was issued for Mondeos manufactured between 6 October 2014 and 21 March 2017. The driver's side front airbag inflator in these vehicles had contained propellant wafers that could absorb moisture over time. When the airbags activate, excessive internal pressure would cause the metal airbag inflator housing to explode/rupture and send the metal fragments through the airbag and into the cabin; the fragments created a risk of serious injury or death. In the UK, 219,738 units were affected. In late 2019, a recall was issued for Mondeos for sale in between 6 October 2014 and 6 September 2018. In these vehicles, battery acid could possibly leak around the negative battery terminal. If copper sulphate accumulated over time, this would provide a low-resistance conductive layer below the Battery Monitoring Sensor, which would cause the surround to overheat and ignite. In the UK, 56,154 Mondeos were affected by this. The Mondeo had received a number of other faults, such as the oil sump cracking due to the engine overheating, clutch pressure plate fracturing, and numerous other recalls.

=== Awards ===
In January 2015, after being on sale for only a month, the Mondeo was given the 2015 What Car? Award in January 2015. The Mondeo was later crowned Car Of The Year and Most Popular Large Family Car at the 2015 Honest John awards. The Mondeo was named 'Best Family Car' at the UK Car of the Year Awards, two months after being on sale. This model had won due to its advanced technologies such as Active Park Assist and the Dynamic LED headlights. The Mondeo was awarded Continental Irish Car of the Year on 20 November 2016.

== Discontinuation ==
Ford initially denied rumours of ending production of the Mondeo and the closely related S-Max and Galaxy MPVs in Europe, but in March 2021 the company announced that it will discontinue the production of the Mondeo in Europe and Argentina with no direct successor. Production of the Mondeo ended in Europe with the final car that was completed on 30 March 2022. The car was painted grey and it rolled off the production line at the Valencia plant on 4 April 2022. This model represented the final Mondeo ever produced in Europe.
