= Ford Mondeo Sport =

Mid-size crossover SUV

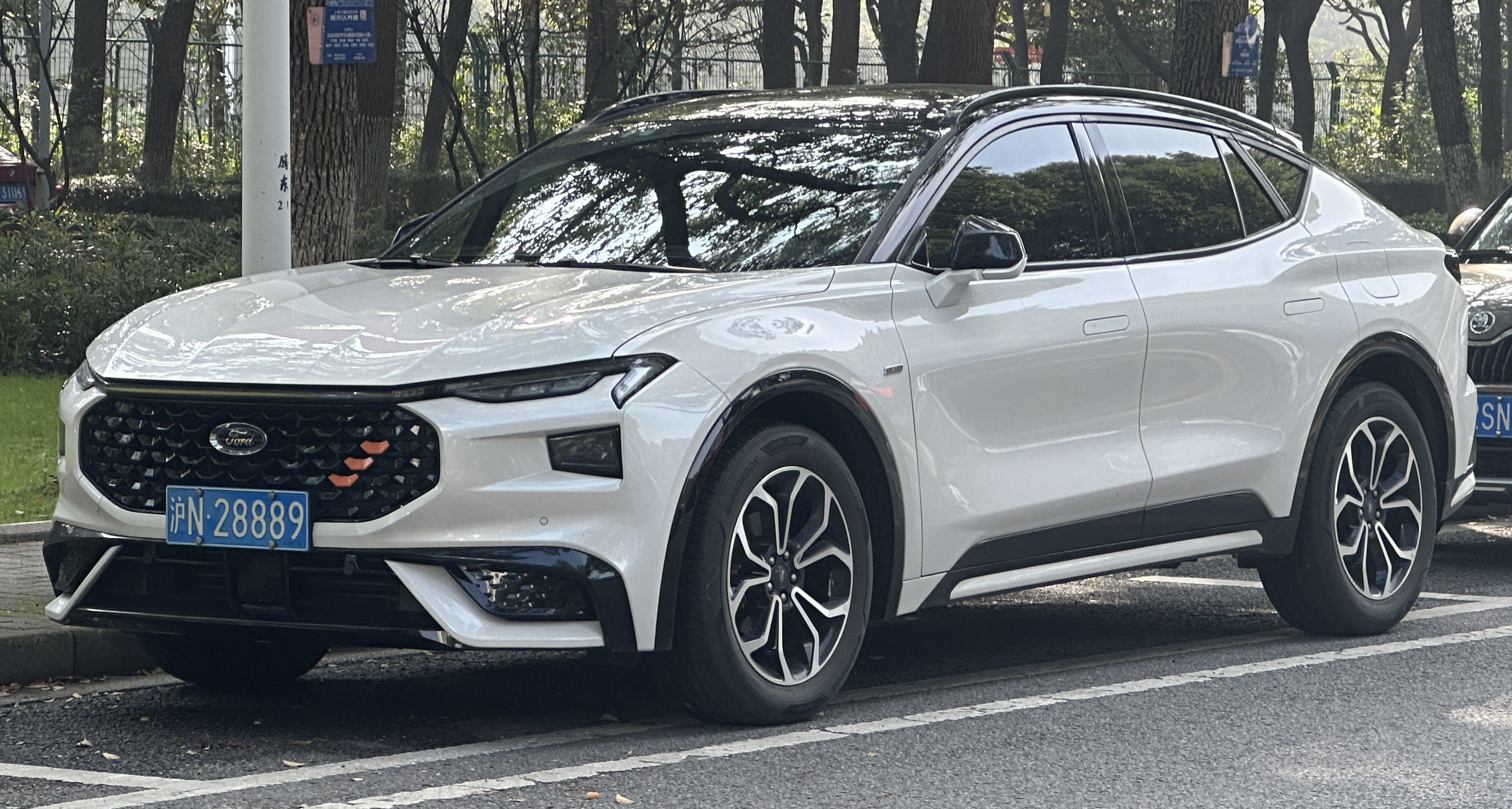

Overview
- Manufacturer: Ford
- Also called: Ford Evos (2021–2024)
- Production: 2021–present
- Assembly: China: Chongqing (Changan Ford)
- Designer: Nathan Kongsarai; Siddhartha Kazami (ST Line)

Body and chassis
- Class: Mid-size crossover SUV
- Body style: 5-door coupe SUV
- Layout: Front-engine, front-wheel-drive
- Platform: Ford C2 platform
- Related: Ford Mondeo (fifth generation); Lincoln Z

Powertrain
- Engine: Gasoline: 2.0 L CAF488WQC EcoBoost I4 turbo; Gasoline hybrid: 2.0 L CAF484WQH1 Ecoboost I4 turbo
- Electric motor: Permanent-magnet AC-synchronous
- Power output: 175 kW (235 hp; 238 PS) (Evos; 2021–2024); 227 kW (304 hp; 309 PS) (Mondeo Sport; 2024+)
- Transmission: 8-speed automatic; e-CVT (full hybrid)
- Hybrid drivetrain: Full-hybrid
- Battery: Li-NMC BYD

Dimensions
- Wheelbase: 2,945 mm (115.9 in)
- Length: 4,920 mm (193.7 in)
- Width: 1,920 mm (75.6 in)
- Height: 1,600 mm (63.0 in)
- Curb weight: 1,626–1,736 kg (3,585–3,827 lb)

The Ford Mondeo Sport (Chinese: 福特蒙迪欧 运动; pinyin: Fútè méngdí'ōu yùndòng), previously the Ford Evos (stylized: EVOS) until 2024, is a mid-size crossover coupe SUV produced by Ford through Changan Ford joint venture in China since 2021. The vehicle debuted at Auto Shanghai in China in April 2021.

== History ==
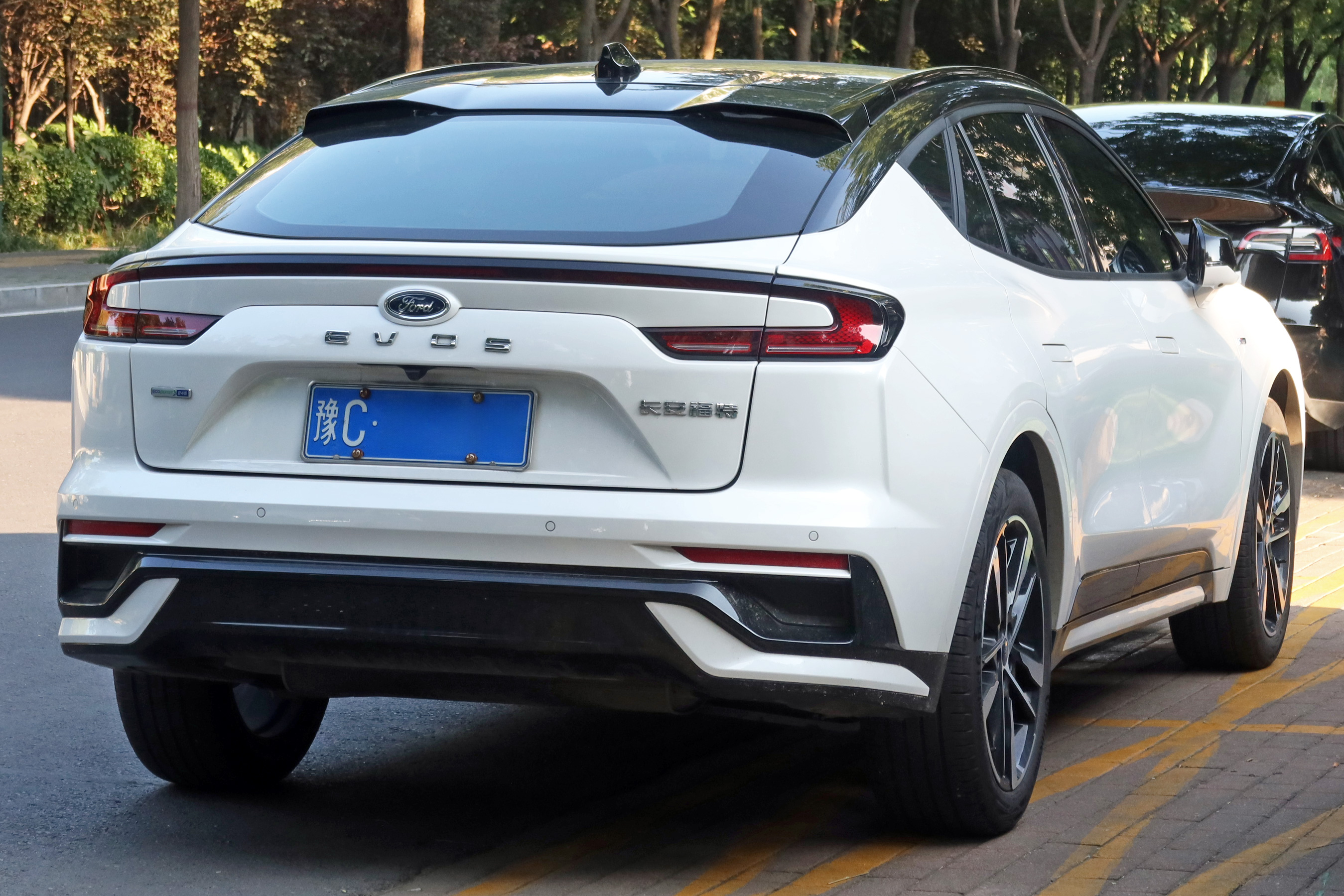
Rear view

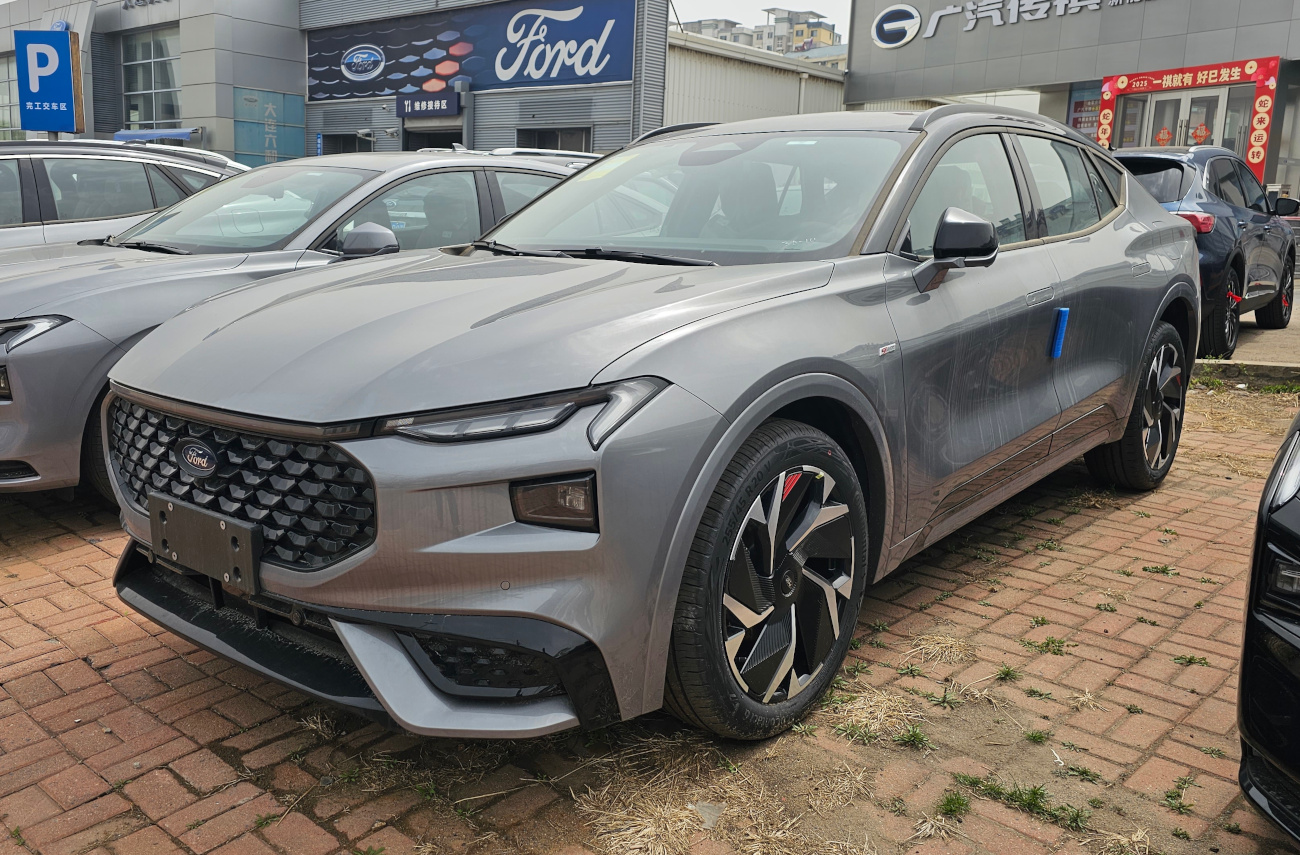
Ford Mondeo Sport Hybrid ST-Line

Developed largely by a China-based team of Ford, the Evos has been described as a mix between a crossover and a fastback or station wagon due to its low-slung proportion.

The interior of the Evos features a large touchscreen panel spanning 1.1 m (3.6 feet) which consists of two displays, which are 12.3-inch digital instrument cluster and second is a 27-inch 4K infotainment display that runs on Ford Sync+ 2.0. The Evos also features BlueCruise, Ford's new Level 2 driver-assist technology. Other features include a "co-pilot" mode which allows the front passenger to take over their half of the huge display and relay pertinent information to the driver.

Journalists have speculated that the Evos will be a successor to the Fusion/Mondeo for North America and Europe due to low sales of the sedans and station wagons markets. However, it was confirmed that the Evos would not be available in North America.

In September 2024, the Evos was renamed to Mondeo Sport, which is exclusively available with a hybrid powertrain.

=== Powertrain ===
The Evos is exclusively available with a 2.0-liter turbocharged inline-4 outputting 235 hp (175 kW; 238 PS) at 5,500 rpm and 376 N⋅m (277 lb⋅ft) of torque at 2,500–3,750 rpm and paired with an 8-speed automatic transmission.

The Mondeo Sport is exclusively available with a 304 hp (227 kW; 308 PS) hybrid system in late 2024. It uses a 2.0-liter turbocharged inline-4 outputting 284 hp (212 kW; 288 PS) at 5,500 rpm and 403 N⋅m (297 lb⋅ft) of torque at 3,000–4,500 rpm and uses port and direct injection and has a compression ratio of 9.5:1. It is paired with a 140 kW (188 hp; 190 PS) electric motor outputting 320 N⋅m (236 lb⋅ft) of torque in a planetary e-CVT transmission, which is powered by a BYD-supplied Li-NMC battery pack. It is rated for fuel consumption of 5.99 L/100 km (39 mpg_{‑US}; 47 mpg_{‑imp}) on the WLTC cycle.

== Sales ==
Year	China
2022	6,094
2023	2,211
2024	892
2025	5,525
