= Ford Mondeo (fifth generation) =

Chinese full-size sedan

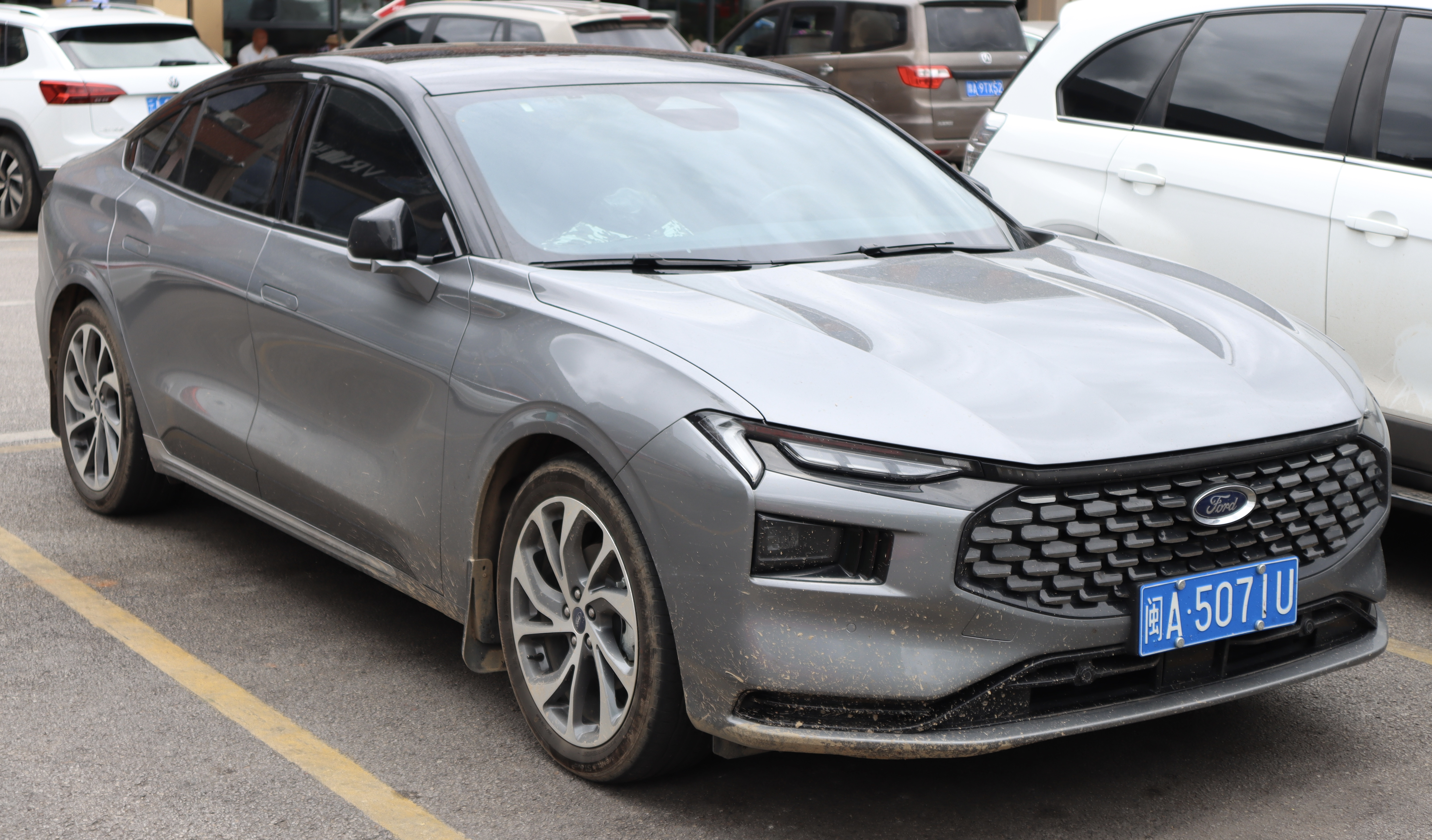

Overview
- Manufacturer: Ford
- Also called: Ford Taurus (Middle East, Cambodia)
- Production: 2022–present
- Assembly: China: Chongqing (Changan Ford)
- Designer: Nathan Kongsarai

Body and chassis
- Class: Full-size car (E)
- Body style: 4-door sedan
- Layout: Front-engine, front-wheel drive
- Platform: Ford C2
- Related: Ford Evos / Mondeo Sport; Lincoln Z

Powertrain
- Engine: Gasoline: 1.5 L Ecoboost turbo I4; 2.0 L CAF488WQC Ecoboost turbo I4; 2.0 L CAF484WQC1 Ecoboost turbo I4; Petrol hybrid: 1.5 L E Hybrid turbo I4
- Electric motor: 96 kW (129 hp; 131 PS) Permanent magnet synchronous motor (hybrid)
- Power output: 140 kW (188 hp; 190 PS) (1.5L); 187 kW (251 hp; 254 PS) (2.0L); 153 kW (205 hp; 208 PS) (Hybrid)
- Transmission: 8-speed 8F-Series automatic; Planetary eCVT
- Battery: Low nickel lithium-ion
- Range: 920–1,080 km (572–671 mi)

Dimensions
- Wheelbase: 2,945 mm (115.9 in)
- Length: 4,935 mm (194.3 in)
- Width: 1,875 mm (73.8 in)
- Height: 1,498 mm (59.0 in)
- Curb weight: 1,503–1,642 kg (3,314–3,620 lb)

Chronology
- Predecessor: Ford Mondeo (fourth generation); Ford Taurus (China)

The fifth-generation Ford Mondeo is a sedan manufactured by Ford through its joint venture Changan Ford in China since 2022. It is the replacement for the outgoing fourth-generation Mondeo and the Chinese market Taurus. The car is the sedan counterpart of the Mondeo Sport crossover, and shares the same platform as the mid-size luxury Lincoln Z. It is also marketed in the Middle East as the Ford Taurus.

== Overview ==
The fifth-generation Ford Mondeo was first spied testing in Belgium in June 2021, then again in Michigan, United States later in October 2021. It is exclusively produced and sold in China, as Ford now exclusively focuses on pickup trucks, SUVs, vans, and the Mustang in North American markets.

The Mondeo features updated exterior styling that fits in with the contemporary Ford lineup, including the Evos crossover. The LED headlights now have a lightbar styling feature, and the grille has a 'breathing' feature in which the elements slowly oscillate for visual effect along with patterns displayed by the lightbar LED strip. Some models come with a black painted roof, which is also available with a dual panel panoramic sunroof. The rear features a fastback design and Mustang inspired LED taillights.

The interior features an assortment of screens on the dashboard. Lower end models come with an 8-inch digital gauge cluster along with a 13.2-inch touchscreen infotainment system running SYNC 4 with climate controls integrated. Higher end models come with a 13.2-inch gauge cluster and a 27-inch 4K touchscreen that spans the dashboard. Physical button controls are limited to the steering wheel, lighting controls, a volume scroll wheel and limited shortcut buttons. A rotary knob is used to select transmission gear, with an electronic parking brake toggle located underneath.

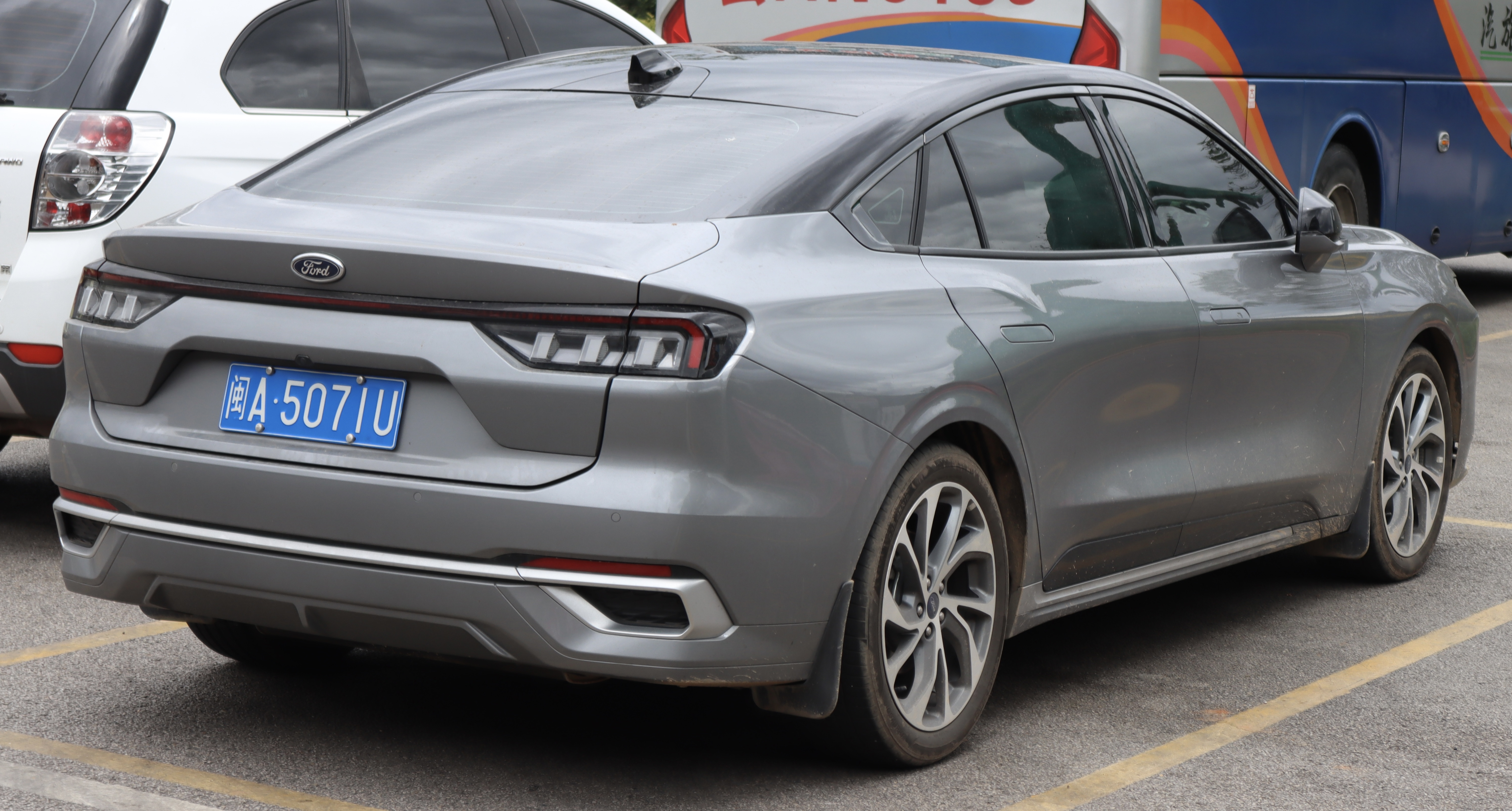
Rear view

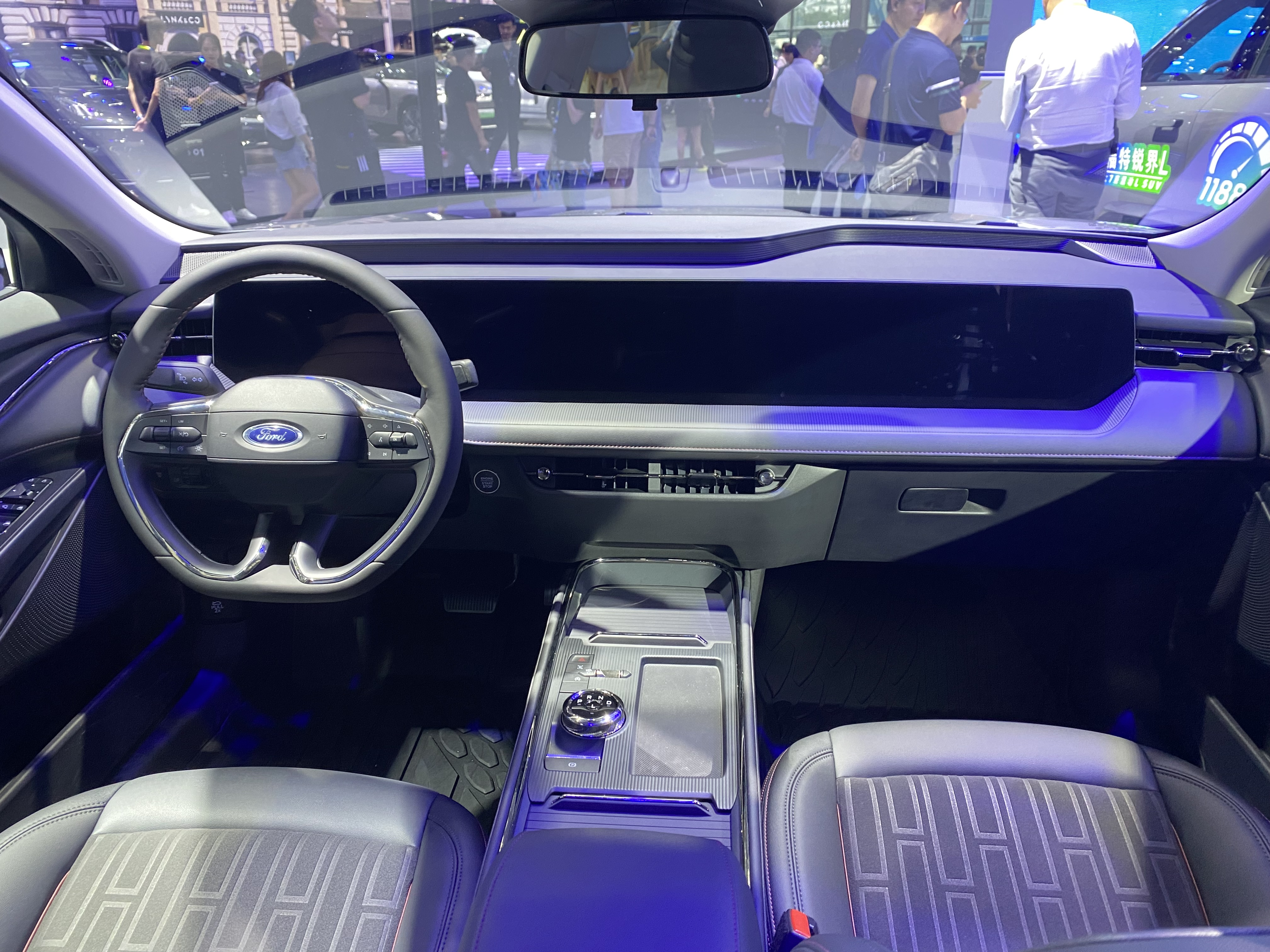
Interior

=== ST-Line ===
The Mondeo ST-Line was unveiled on 24 February 2022 as a sporty variant exclusive to China.

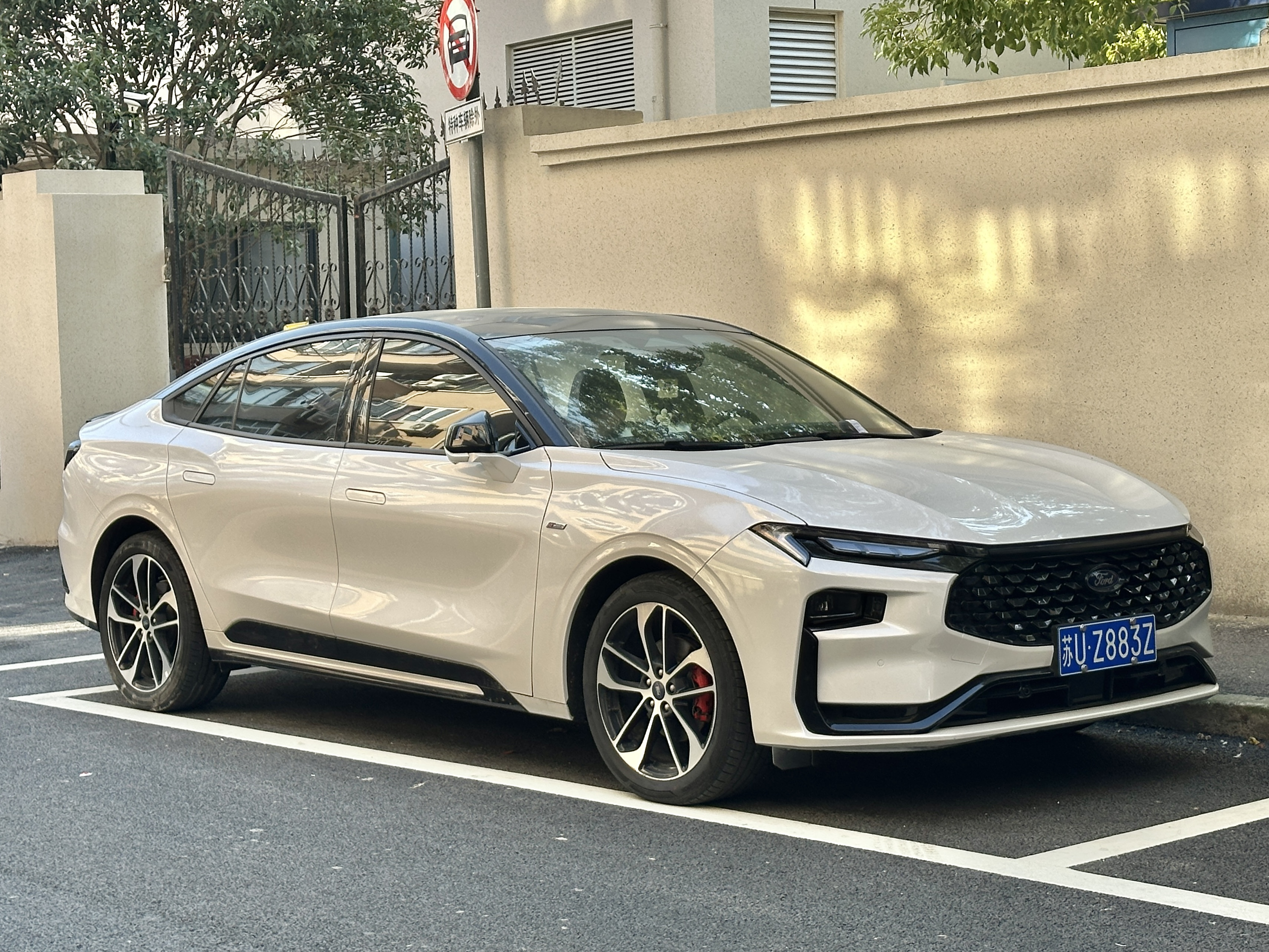
Mondeo ST-Line (front)

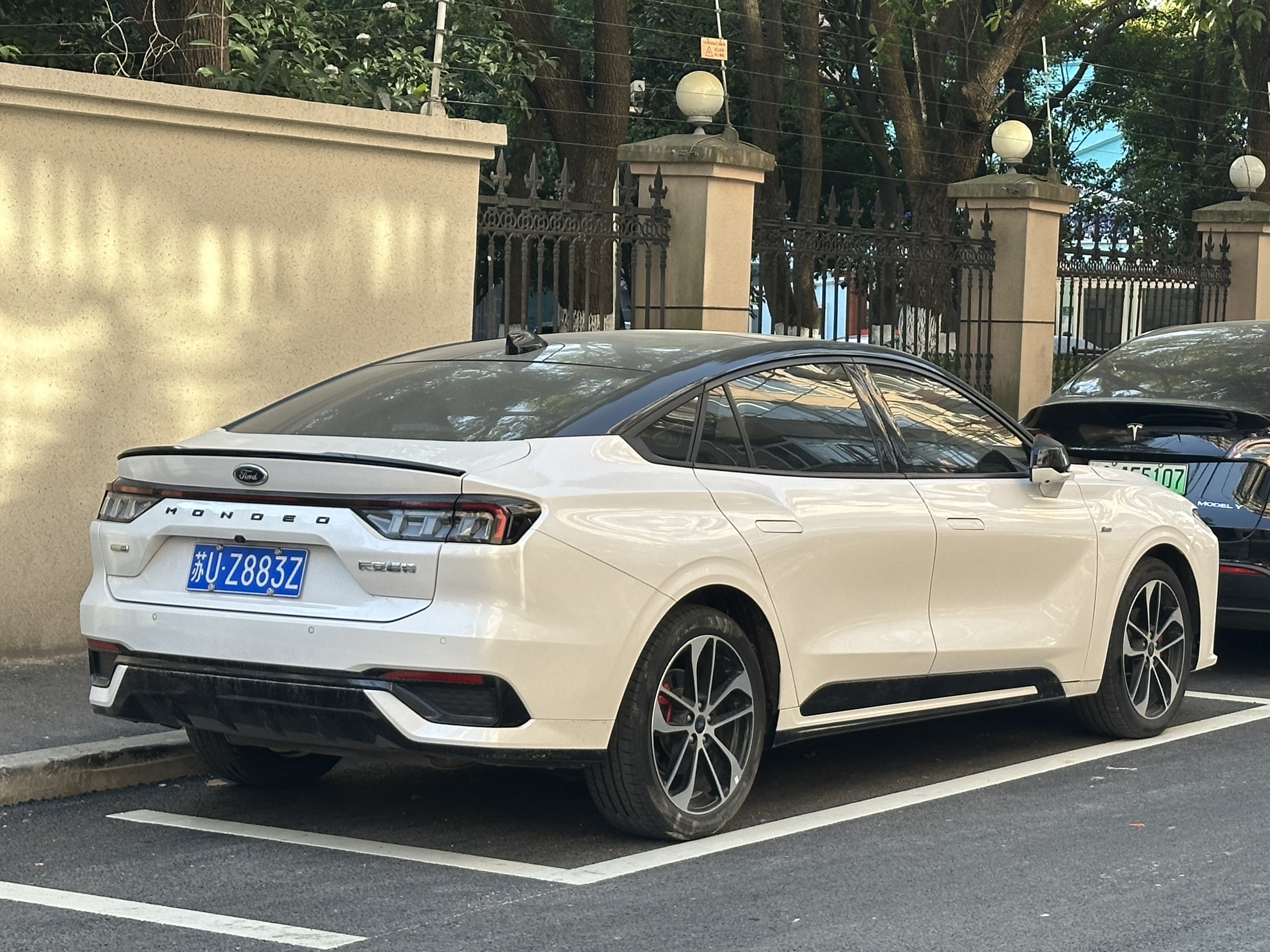
Mondeo ST-Line (rear)

== Facelift (2026) ==
The Mondeo facelift was unveiled in China in November 2025.

The facelift features refreshed styling with a bolder octagonal grille, integrated LED headlights resembling a four-door Mustang, redesigned taillights, and new wheel options up to 19 inches.

Inside, it retains a 27-inch 4K infotainment screen but upgrades to SYNC+ software on a Snapdragon 8155 chip, adds dual wireless charging, and repositions controls for better ergonomics.

The Taurus facelift was also unveiled in the Middle East in December 2025.

Mondeo 2026 facelift front

Mondeo 2026 facelift rear

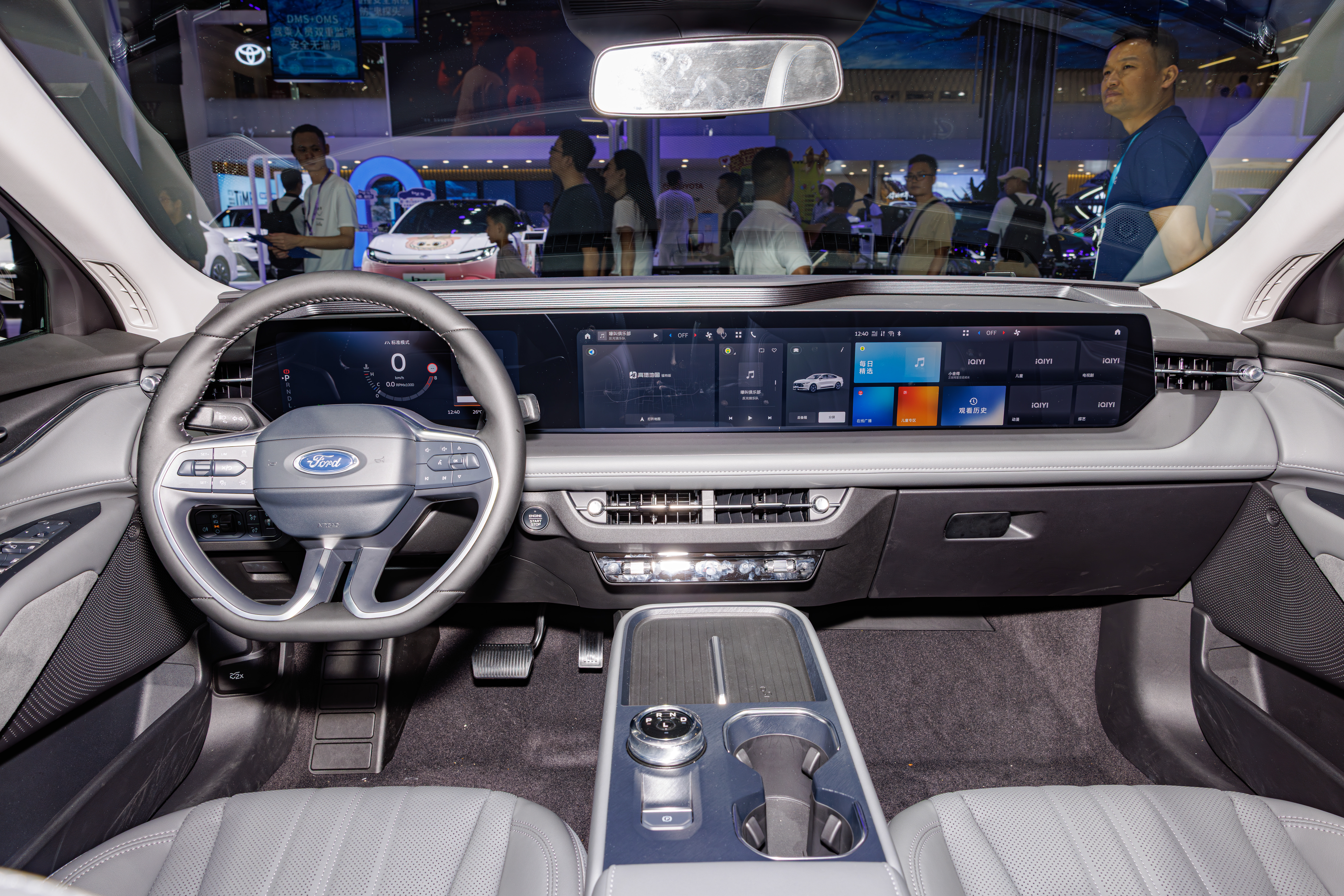
2026 facelift interior

== Markets ==
=== Cambodia ===
In 2026, The fifth-generation Mondeo is marketed in the Cambodian market as the Taurus, launched with only the 1.5 L Ecoboost hybrid powertrain available in only one trim: Taurus Hybrid.

=== China ===
In 2022, the Mondeo launched with only the 2.0 L Ecoboost 245 engine available, with the Fashion, Sport, and ST-Line trims.

In 2024, the Mondeo is available in 6 trim levels. The Fashion and Comfort trims are only available with the base 1.5 L Ecoboost 180 engine, while the Deluxe and Extreme trims can optionally upgrade to the 2.0 L Ecoboost 245 engine. The Luxury trim comes exclusively with the 1.5 L E Hybrid powertrain, and the range-topping ST-Line is available with either Ecoboost 245 or E Hybrid powertrains.

=== GCC ===
The fifth-generation Mondeo is marketed in GCC countries as the Ford Taurus, replacing the Chinese-sourced Taurus which itself replaced the Fusion and the sixth-generation Taurus models. Three trim levels are available, the Ambiente, Trend, and Titanium.

All models include six airbags, come exclusively with the 13.2-inch touch screen with an eight-inch digital gauge cluster, and a rear-view camera as standard.

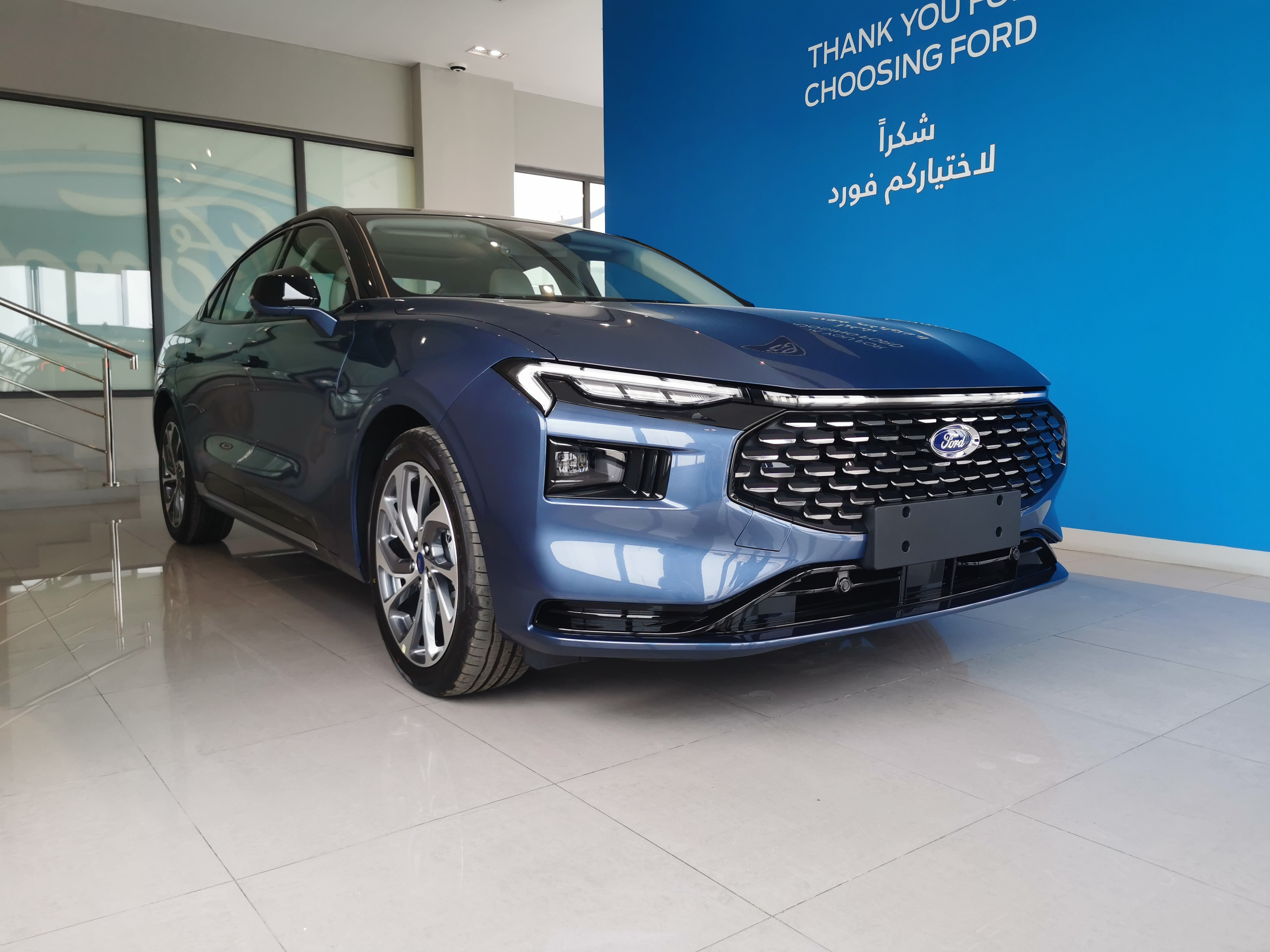
Taurus 2023 GCC front

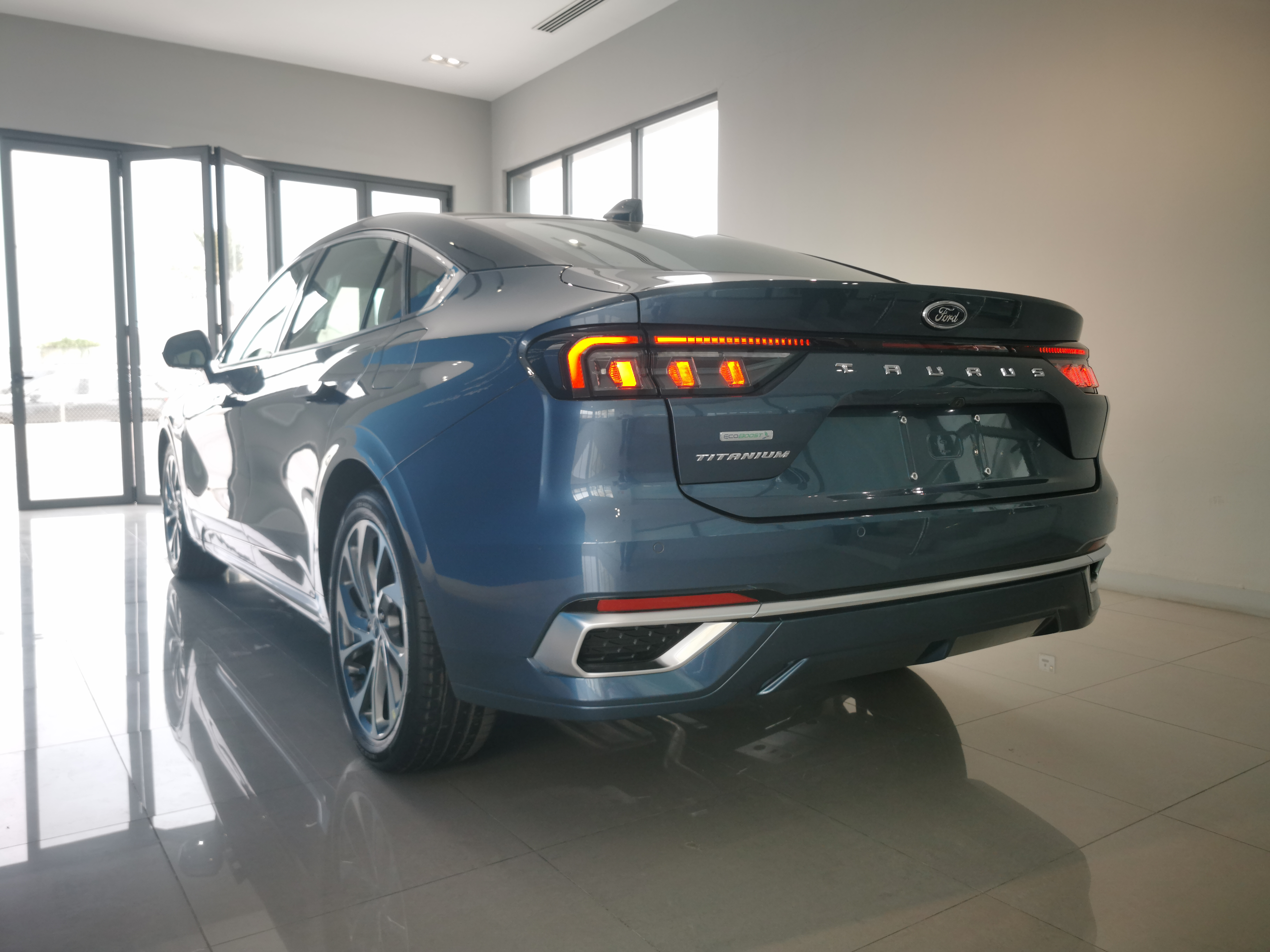
Taurus 2023 GCC rear

== Powertrain ==
As of 2024, the Mondeo is offered with three different powertrains in China, two petrol and one petrol-electric hybrid. Unlike other large discontinued Lincolns and Ford sedan in North America that were all-wheel drive, the Chinese-made Mondeo sedan powertrain wheels only available in front-wheel drive. The base engine is a 1.5 L turbocharged inline-4 cylinder that makes 140 kW (188 hp; 190 PS) and 258 N⋅m (190 lb⋅ft) of torque. The top engine is Changan Ford's CAF488WQC 2.0 L turbocharged inline-4 cylinder with an output of 187 kW (251 hp; 254 PS) and 393 N⋅m (290 lb⋅ft) of torque.

The Middle East Taurus makes 238 hp (177 kW; 241 PS) and 382 N⋅m (282 lb⋅ft). Both are petrol only engines, paired with an 8-speed automatic transmission.

The final available powertrain is a hybrid version of the 1.5 L engine which is paired with a 96-kilowatt (129 hp; 131 PS) permanent magnet synchronous motor, which makes a peak combined output of 153 kW (205 hp; 208 PS). The hybrid's 60-cell lithium-ion battery occupies 16 litres (0.565 cu ft) out of the total 520 litres (18.4 cu ft) of trunk space. It is paired with a planetary eCVT gearbox, and achieves about 33% lower fuel consumption than the standard 1.5 L engine.

Engine Specifications (China)
Engine	Power	Torque	Fuel Economy (China WLTP)	Top Speed	Fuel Tank
1.5L Ecoboost 180	140 kW (188 hp; 190 PS) @6,000 rpm	258 N⋅m (26.3 kg⋅m; 190 lb⋅ft) @1,750-4,500 rpm	6.76 L/100 km (14.8 km/L; 34.8 mpg_{‑US}; 41.8 mpg_{‑imp})	208 km/h (129 mph)	66 litres (17.4 US gal; 14.5 imp gal)
2.0L Ecoboost 245 CAF488WQC (2022–2024)	187 kW (251 hp; 254 PS) @5,500 rpm	393 N⋅m (40.1 kg⋅m; 290 lb⋅ft) @2,000-4,000 rpm	7.15 L/100 km (14.0 km/L; 32.9 mpg_{‑US}; 39.5 mpg_{‑imp})	220 km/h (137 mph)	66 litres (17.4 US gal; 14.5 imp gal)
2.0L Ecoboost CAF484WQC1 MY 2025 (2024–present)	187 kW (251 hp; 254 PS) @5,000 rpm	390 N⋅m (39.8 kg⋅m; 288 lb⋅ft)@2,000-4,000rpm	6.94-7.15 L/100 km	220 km/h (137 mph)	66 litres (17.4 US gal; 14.5 imp gal)
1.5L E Hybrid Ecoboost	ICE: 140 kW (188 hp; 190 PS) Combined: 153 kW (205 hp; 208 PS)	ICE: 222 N⋅m (22.6 kg⋅m; 164 lb⋅ft) @1,750-6,000 rpm Motor: 235 N⋅m (24.0 kg⋅m; 173 lb⋅ft)	4.86 L/100 km (20.6 km/L; 48.4 mpg_{‑US}; 58.1 mpg_{‑imp})	175 km/h (109 mph)	52.6 litres (13.9 US gal; 11.6 imp gal)

== Sales ==
Year	China	Saudi Arabia
2022	60,883 (Note: This figure may include previous generation sales)	
2023	59,904	16,928
2024	61,822	16,190
2025	40,122	23,084
