= Ford CD2 platform =

CD2
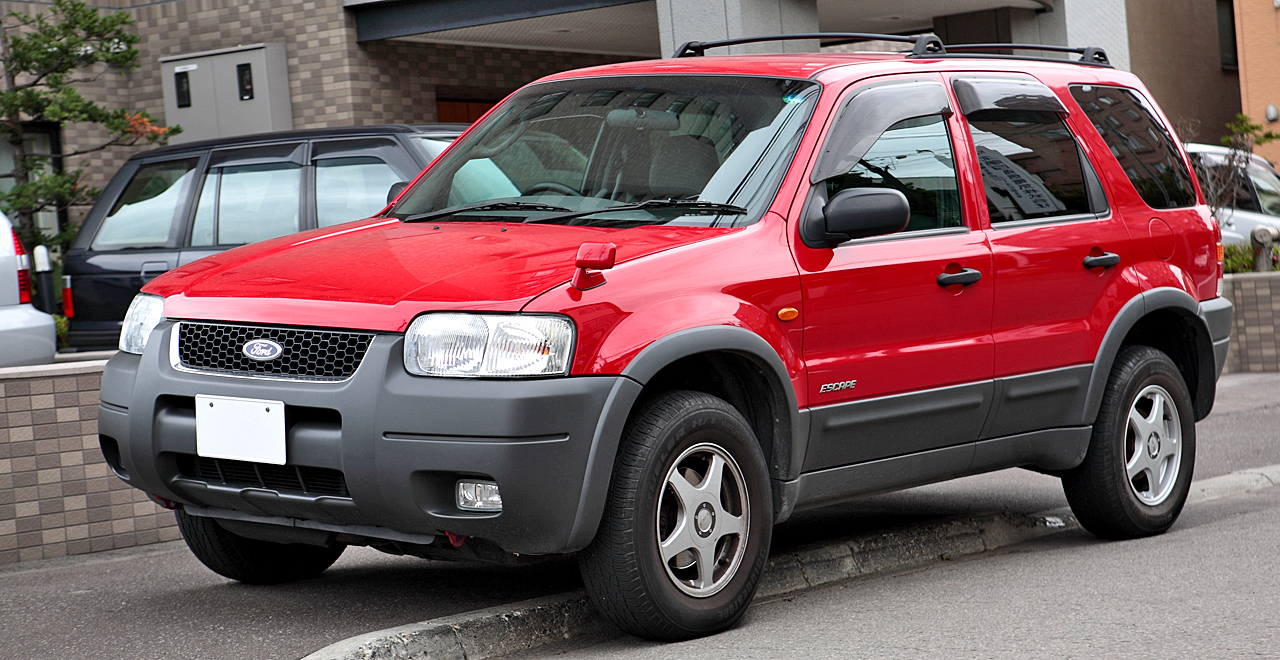

Overview
- Manufacturer: Ford Motor Company
- Production: 2001–2012

Body and chassis
- Class: Compact SUV
- Vehicles: Ford Escape; Mazda Tribute; Mercury Mariner
- Related: Mazda GF

Chronology
- Successor: Ford CD3 platform

The Ford CD2 platform (for "C/D-class" and called U204 internally) is an automobile platform for crossover SUVs. It is the basis for the Mazda Tribute, Ford Escape, and Mercury Mariner, and was jointly developed by Mazda and Ford. The design is based on Mazda's GF platform, used by the Mazda Capella/626.

CD2 is a front wheel drive platform with an all wheel drive option. Tributes and Escapes are manufactured at Mazda's Hofu Plant and Ford's Kansas City Assembly in Claycomo, Missouri. A Mercury Mariner version was briefly produced at the Ohio Assembly in Avon Lake, Ohio, but this line was halted in mid-2005 to allow the plant to convert to Ford Econoline production. The Mariner was subsequently produced at the Kansas City Assembly plant.

The CD2 vehicles were updated for the 2008 model year with a new exterior and interior, but the chassis and powertrain are mainly carried over. The 2008 models debuted in early 2007. A shortened 2007 production run caused Mazda to halt construction of the 2007 model year Tribute for North America. For the 2009 model year, the vehicles received new powertrain options designed to increase power and fuel economy over the previous models.

- 2001–2011– Mazda Tribute
- 2001–2012– Ford Escape
- 2005–2011– Mercury Mariner
- 2004 Ford Bronco concept car
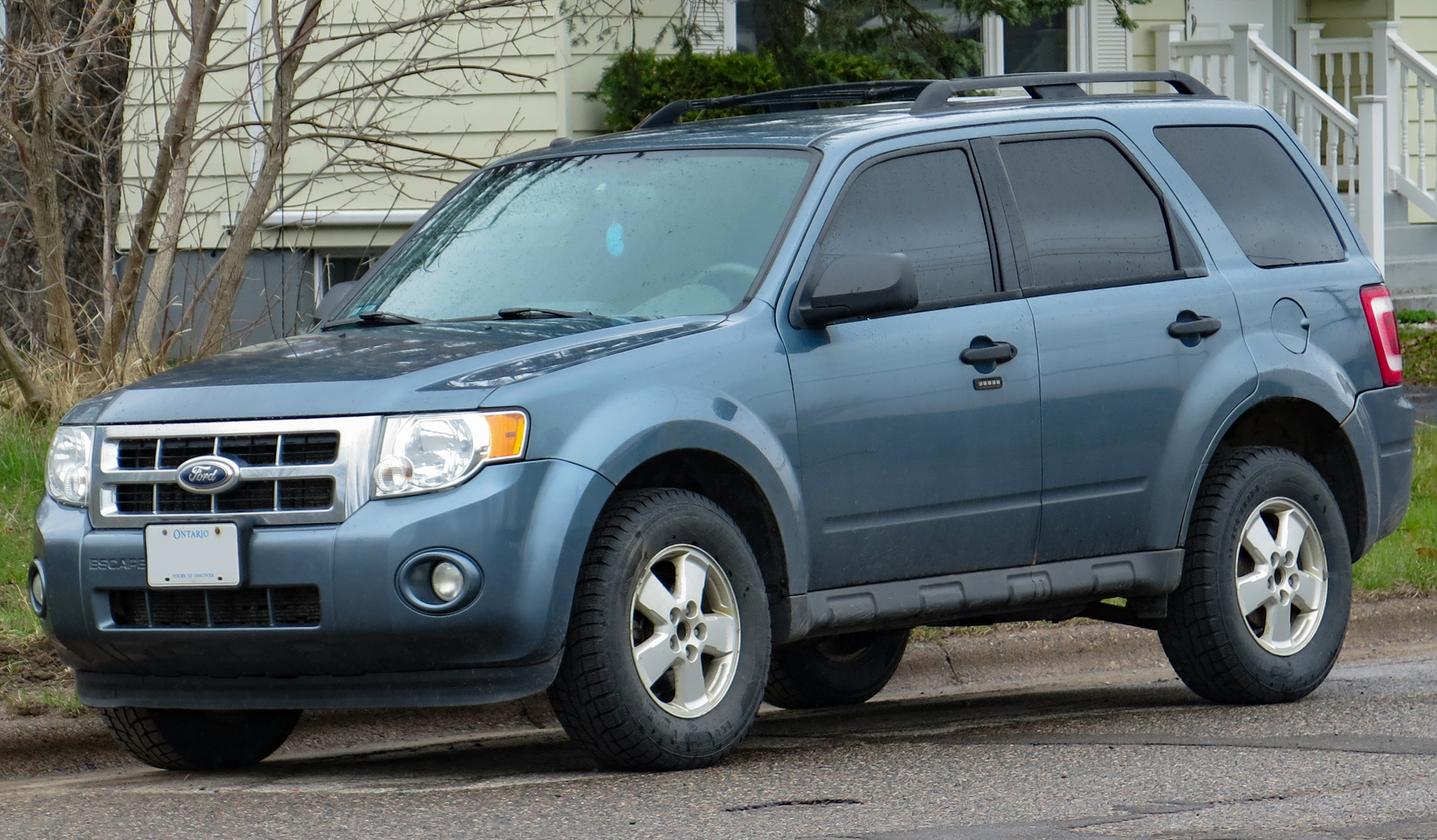
Ford Escape

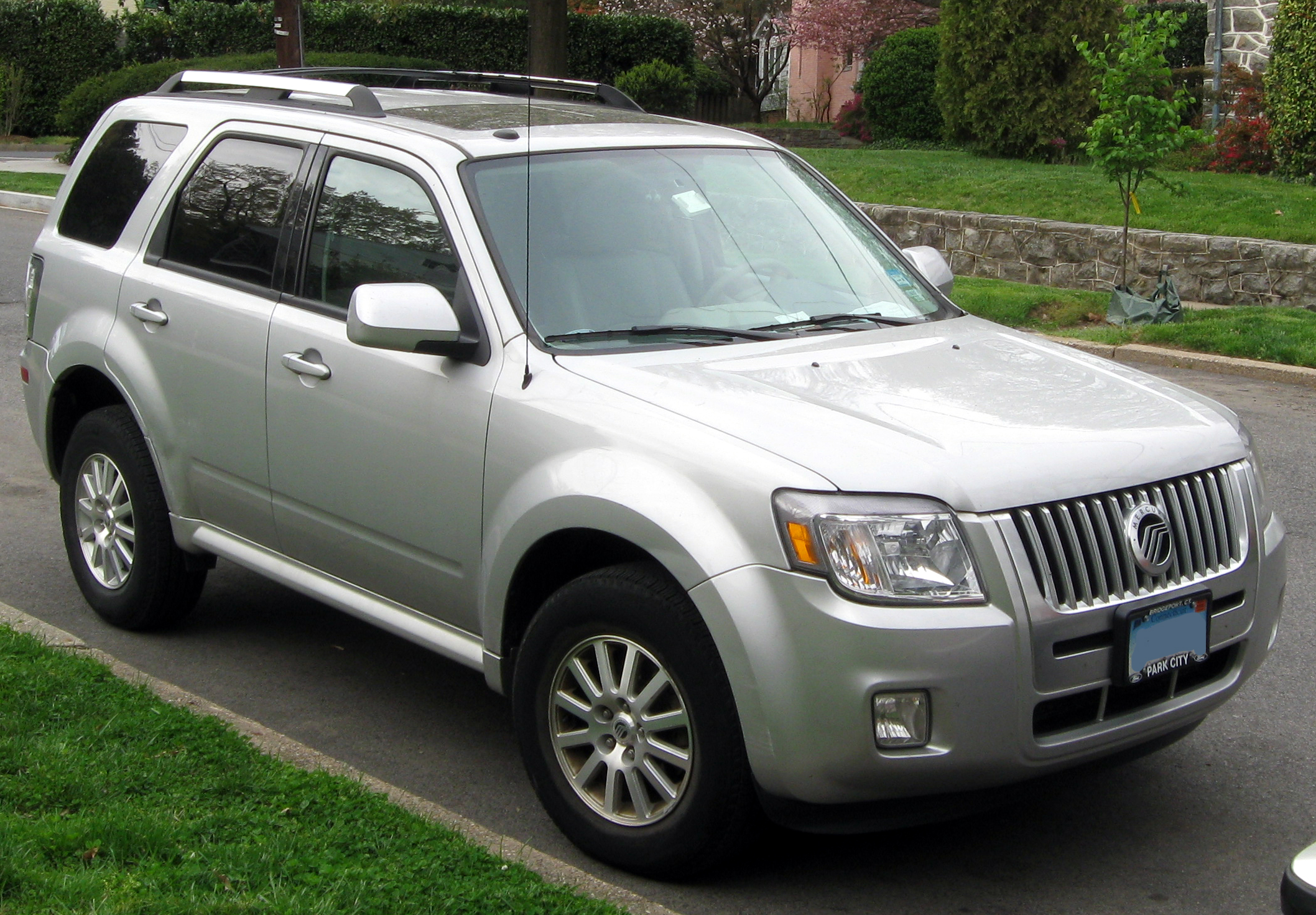
Mercury Mariner

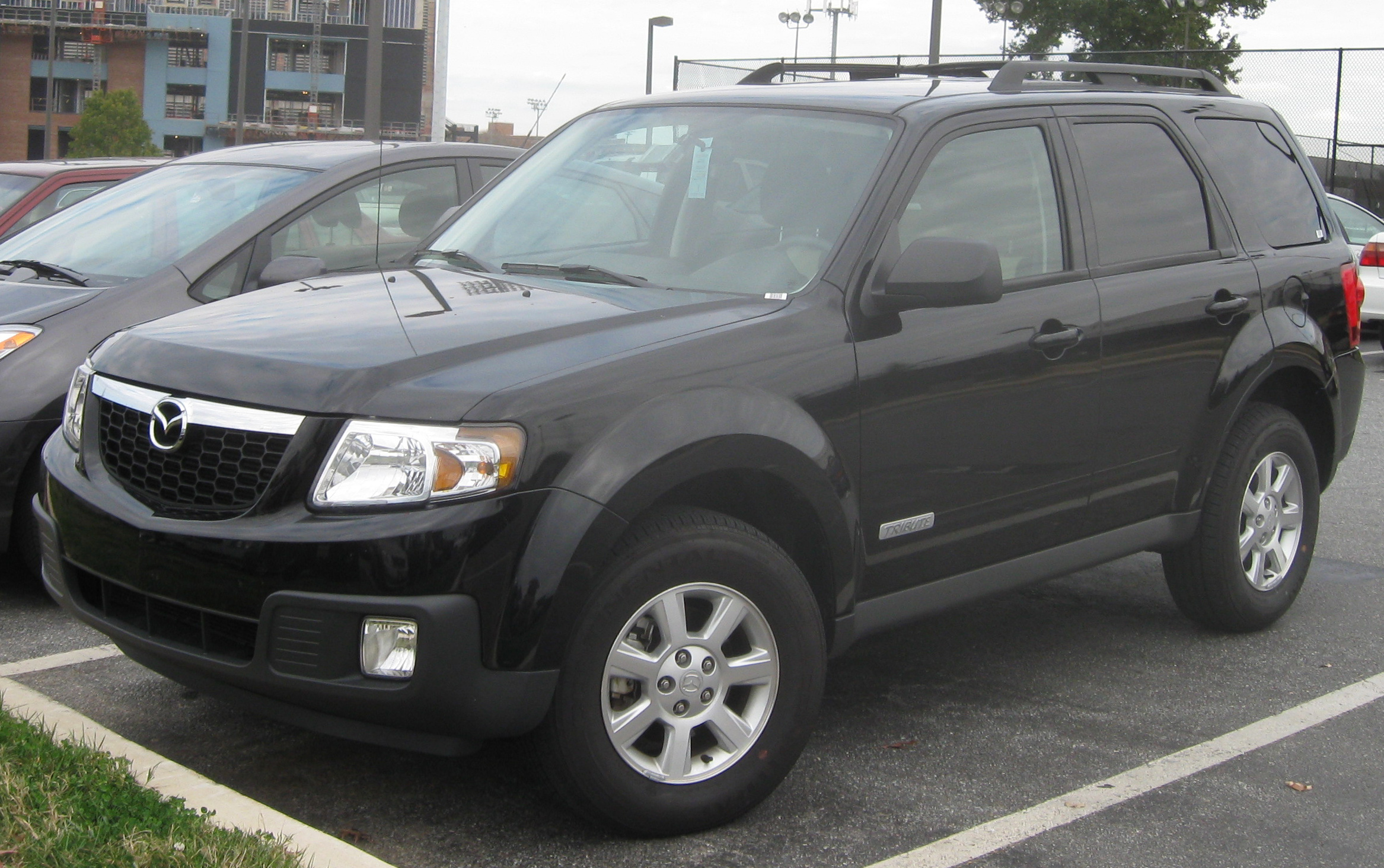
Mazda Tribute

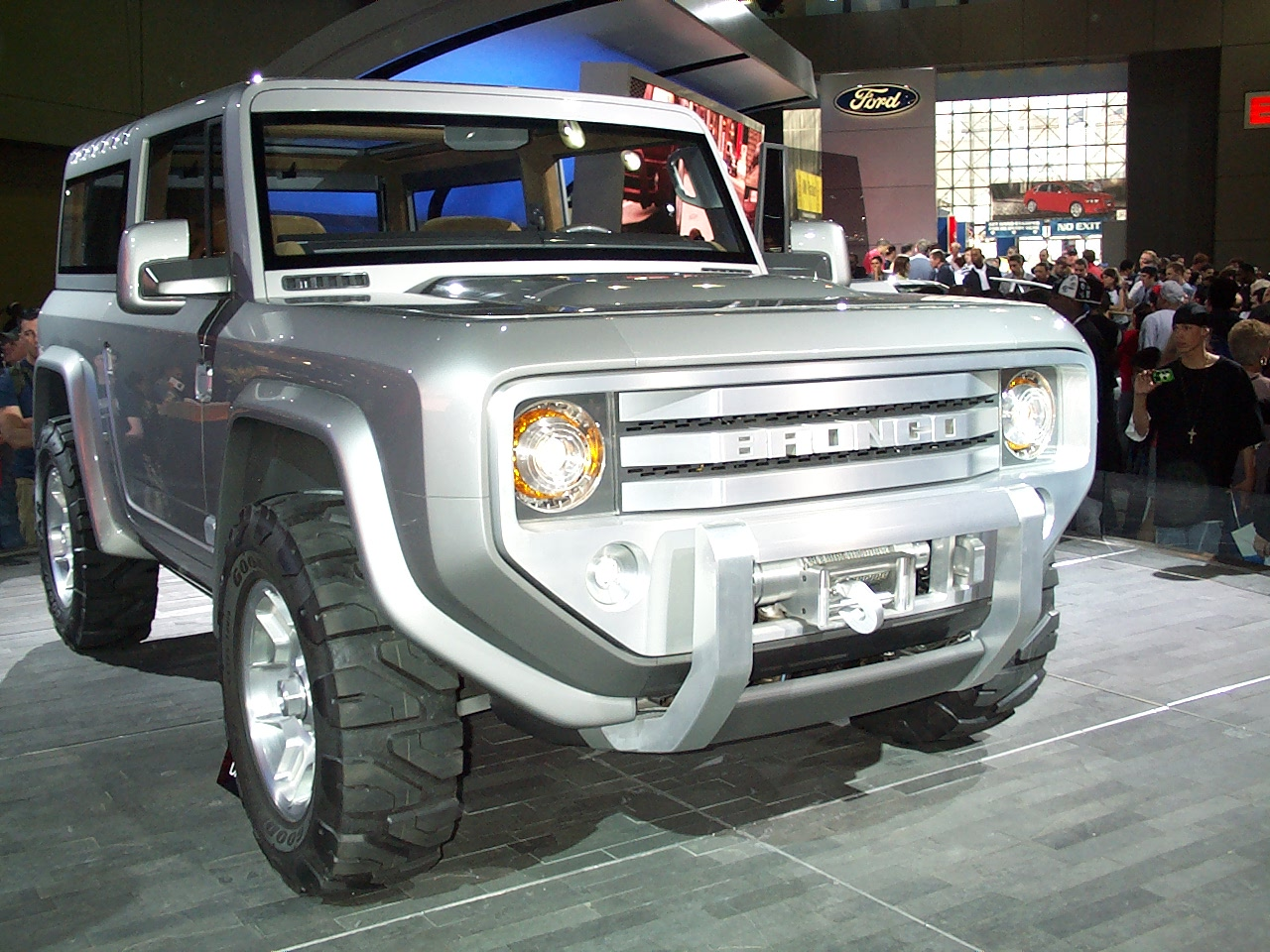
Ford Bronco concept car

from the Mazda GF platform

== See also ==
- Ford U36 platform
- List of Mazda model codes
- List of Ford platforms
