= Mazda Tribute =

Compact SUV

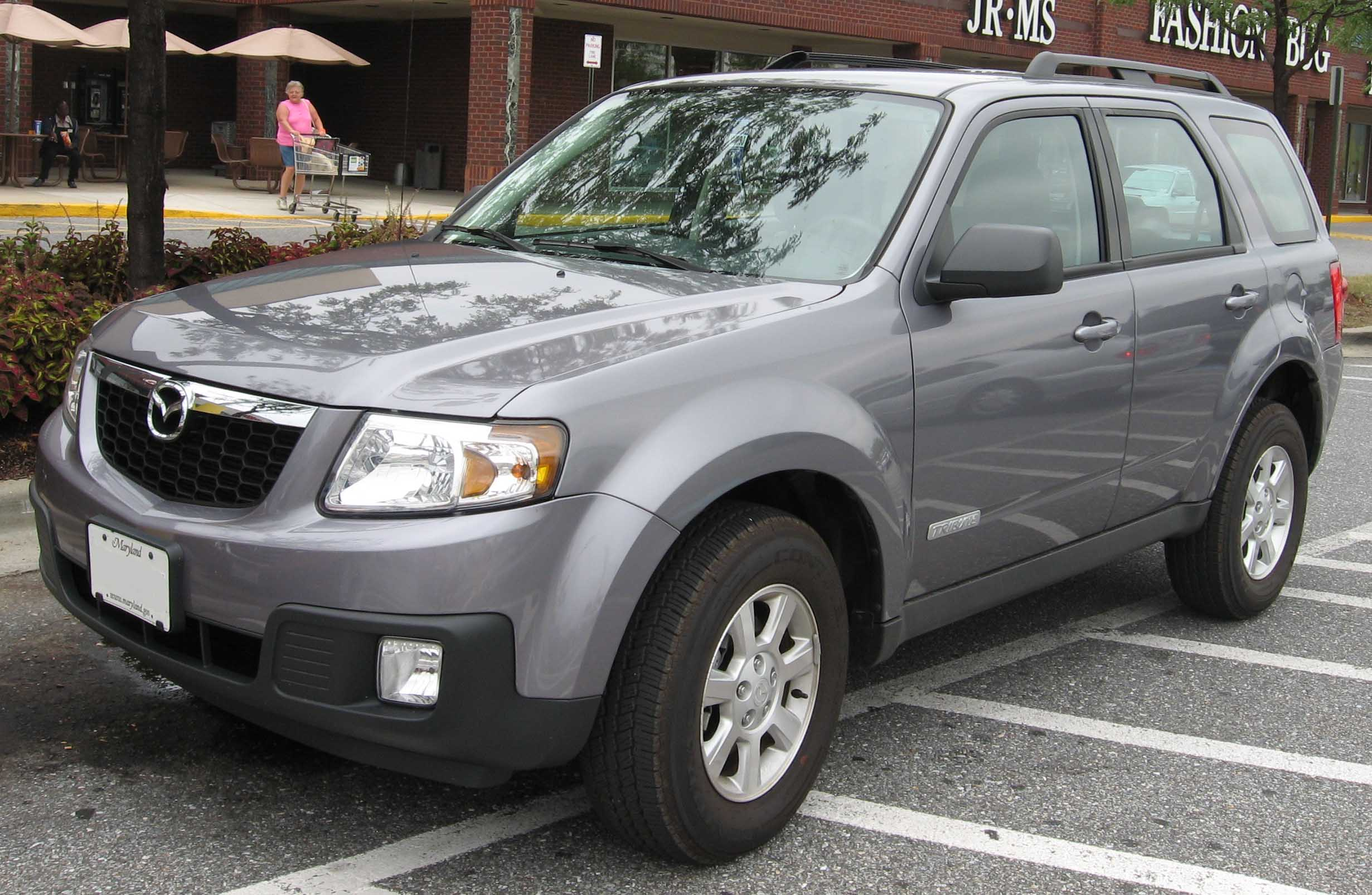

Overview
- Manufacturer: Mazda; Ford Motor Company
- Production: 2000–2011

Body and chassis
- Class: Compact crossover SUV
- Body style: 5-door SUV
- Layout: Front-engine, front-wheel-drive / four-wheel-drive
- Platform: Ford CD2 platform
- Related: Ford Escape; Mercury Mariner

Dimensions
- Wheelbase: 2620 mm (103.1 in)

Chronology
- Predecessor: Mazda Navajo (United States & Mexico); Mazda Proceed Levante (Japan)
- Successor: Mazda CX-7 (Asia); Mazda CX-5 (Americas); Mazda CX-4 (China)

The Mazda Tribute (Japanese: マツダ・トリビュート, Hepburn: Matsuda Toribyūto) (Code J14) is a compact SUV made by Japanese automaker Mazda from 2000 to 2011. It was jointly developed with Ford Motor Company and based on the front-wheel drive Mazda 626 platform, which was in turn the basis for the similar Ford Escape on the CD2 platform. The Tribute was priced below the Ford Escape and Mercury Mariner in Ford's CD2 SUV lineup.

The Tribute and Escape debuted in 2000, offering front- or all-wheel drive and a choice of a transversely mounted 2.0 L Ford Zetec four-cylinder engine or 3.0 L Ford Duratec V6. The Ford Escape was also sold as the Ford Maverick in Europe with a Ford 2.0 L Zeta four-cylinder engine with manual transmission, or 3.0 L Duratec coupled to automatic transmission.

One main difference between the Tribute and the Ford Escape/Maverick is that the Tribute's suspension is tuned for a firmer ride than the Escape/Maverick, in order to correspond with Mazda's sporty image. As Mazda had offered "spiced up" models in other segments such as the Mazda3 and CX-7, the utilitarian Tribute was replaced by the more aggressively styled and in-house-designed Mazda CX-5 in North America.

== First generation (EP; 2000) ==
=== 2000 ===
First generation
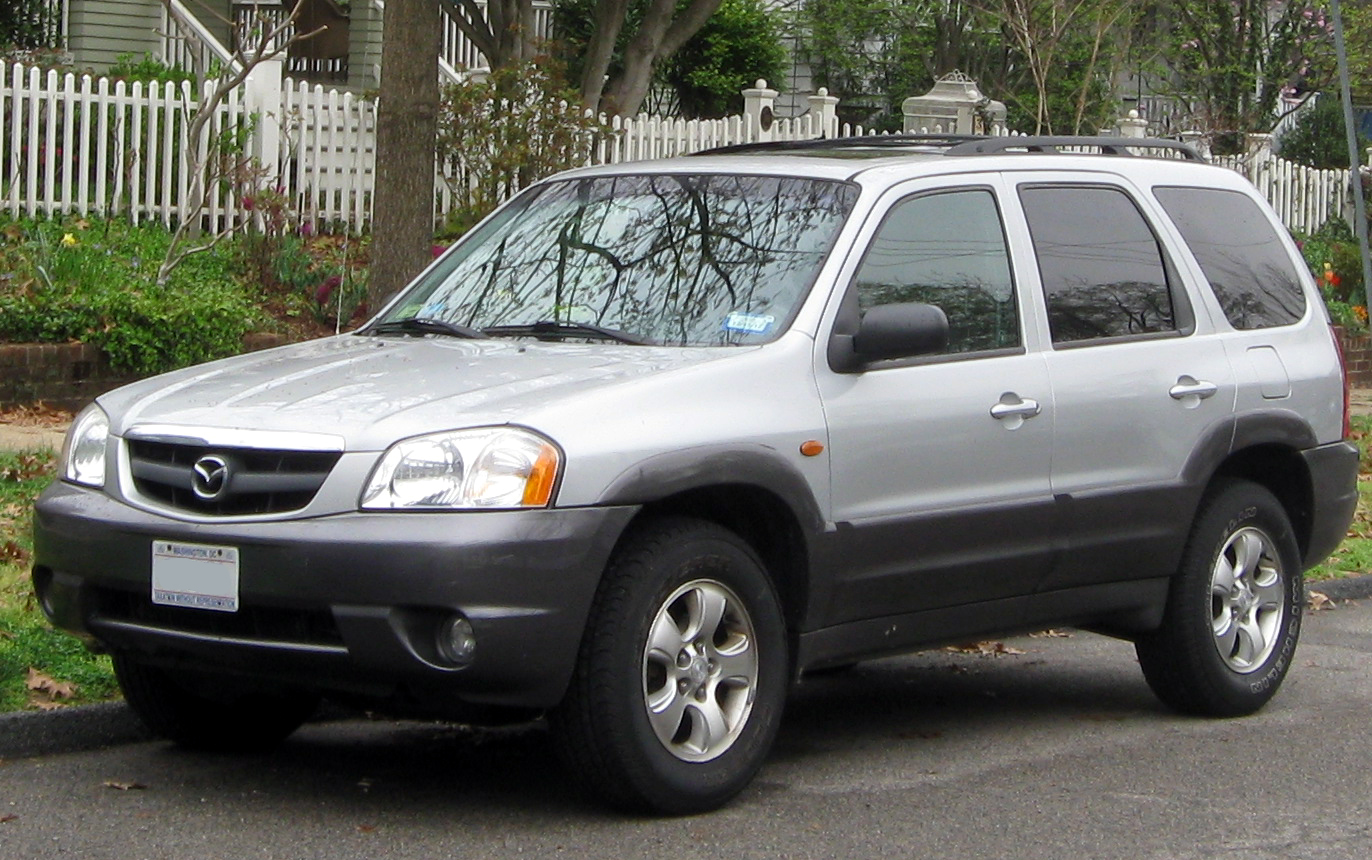

Overview
- Model code: EP
- Production: April 2000 – December 2006; Taiwan until 2010
- Model years: 2001–2006
- Assembly: Hofu, Japan (Hofu Plant); Claycomo, Missouri, United States (KCAP); Jhongli, Taiwan (Ford Lio Ho); Santa Rosa, Laguna, Philippines (Ford Philippines); Kairouan, Tunisia (IMM)

Powertrain
- Engine: Gasoline: 2.0 L YF I4 (EPE); 2.3 L L3 I4 (EP3); 3.0 L AJ V6 (EPF)

Dimensions
- Length: 2001–04: 4,394 mm (173.0 in); 2005–06: 4,430 mm (174.4 in)
- Width: 2001–04 DX: 1,798 mm (70.8 in); 2001–04 LX & ES: 1,826 mm (71.9 in); 2005–06: 1,829 mm (72.0 in)
- Height: 2001–04 DX: 1,760 mm (69.3 in); 2001–04 LX & ES: 1,775 mm (69.9 in); 2005–06: 1,778 mm (70.0 in)

The Tribute made its debut at the 2000 Los Angeles Auto Show as a compact crossover SUV, a segment pioneered by the Toyota RAV4 in 1994. Its conservative styling resembled the Mazda Navajo, a rebadged two-door Ford Explorer which was retired in 1994. In Japan, Mazda had already been selling an SUV called the Mazda Proceed Levante, a rebadged Suzuki Escudo by 1995, but the Tribute was Mazda's first original SUV. The Tribute made its European debut in October 2000, at the Paris Salon. The Ford plant in Claycomo, Missouri assembled the Tribute for the North American market, alongside the Ford Escape. The Mazda plant in Hofu, Japan and the Ford Lio Ho plant in Taiwan also assembled the Tribute for their respective markets.

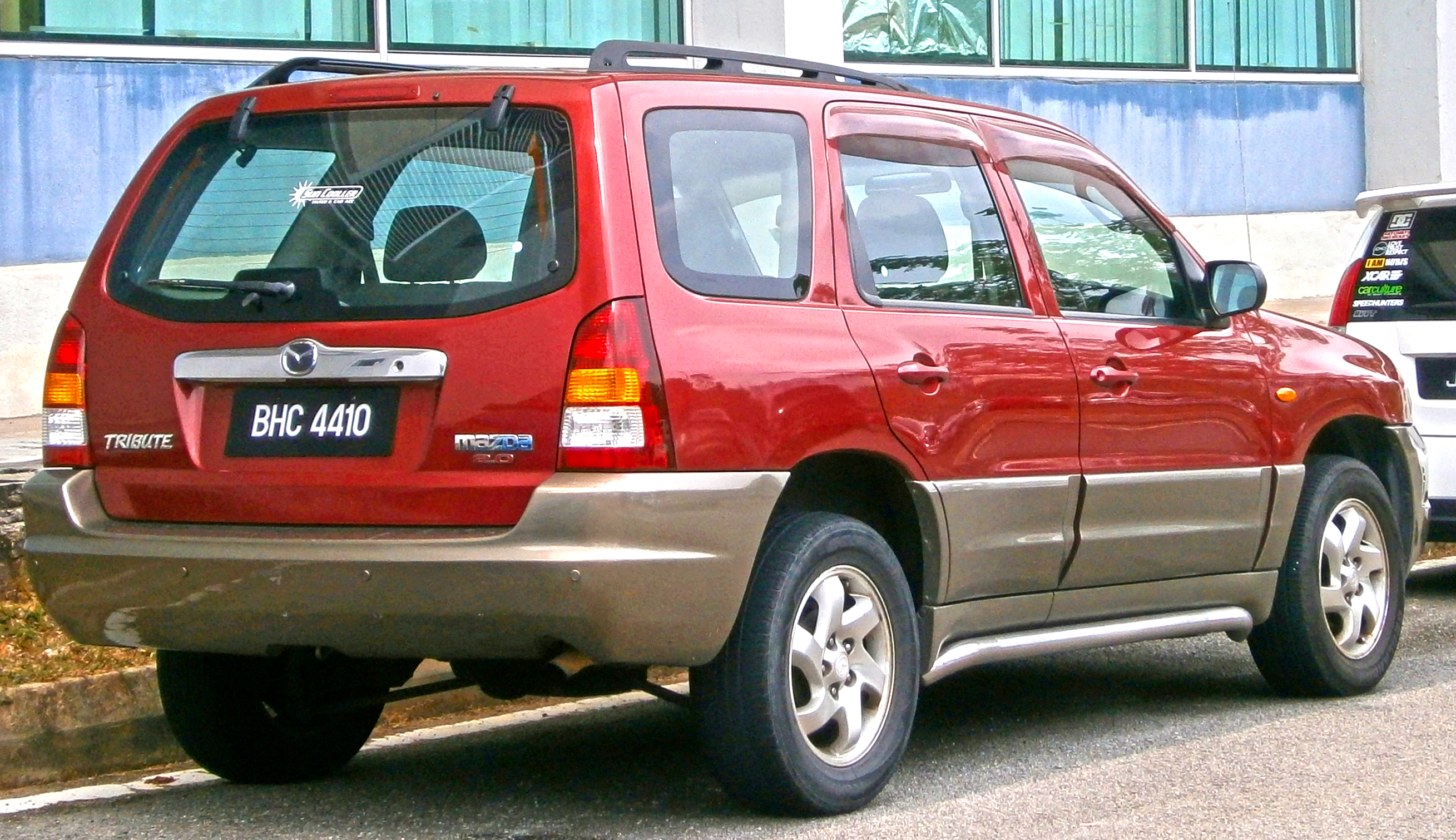
2004 Mazda Tribute 2.0 (Malaysia; pre-facelift)

Japanese sales commenced in November 2001. The Japanese lineup was only available with a column-shifted four-speed automatic transmission. The lineup included the 2-liter LX with two- or four-wheel drive, and the four-wheel drive 3.0 V6 either as the LX or the well equipped GL-X. LX models were also available with a "G package": this included aluminum wheels, side airbags, and tinted glass amongst other extras. In May 2001 a front-wheel drive V6 LX model was added, as was the option of an "L package" (with leather seats and more) on the GL-X version. In October 2001 the "Field Break" special edition was introduced; this leisure oriented model had seats with water-repellant fabric, a front pushbar, and other amenities aimed people with "active" lifestyles.

Engine options:

- 2.0 L YF I4, 130 PS (96 kW; 128 hp)/183 N⋅m (135 lb⋅ft)
- 3.0 L AJ V6, 200 PS (147 kW; 197 hp)/265 N⋅m (195 lb⋅ft)

The 2.0-liter four-cylinder engine had timing belt-driven Camshafts, while the 3.0 L Duratec V6 featured a maintenance-free timing chain.

=== 2004 facelift ===
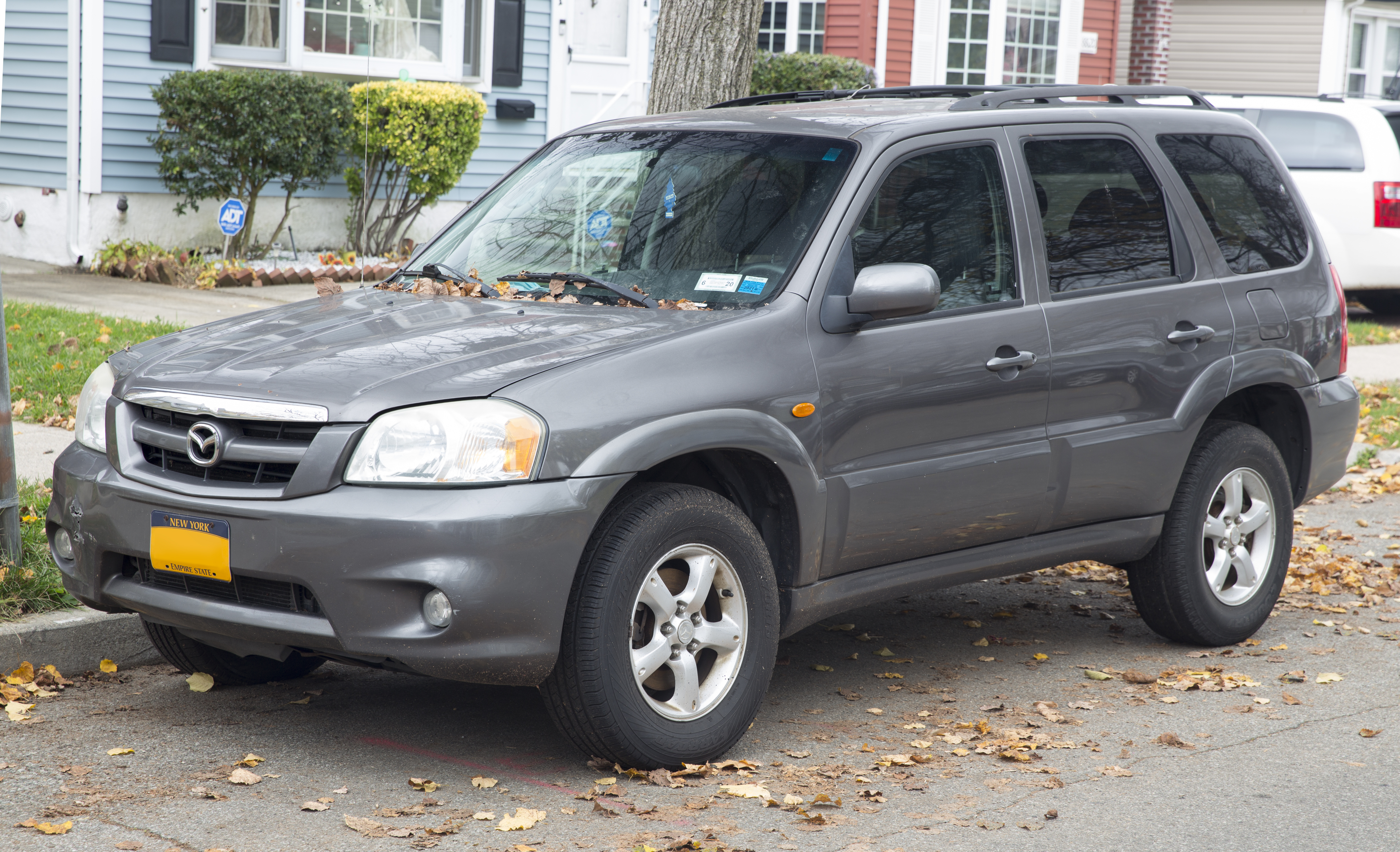

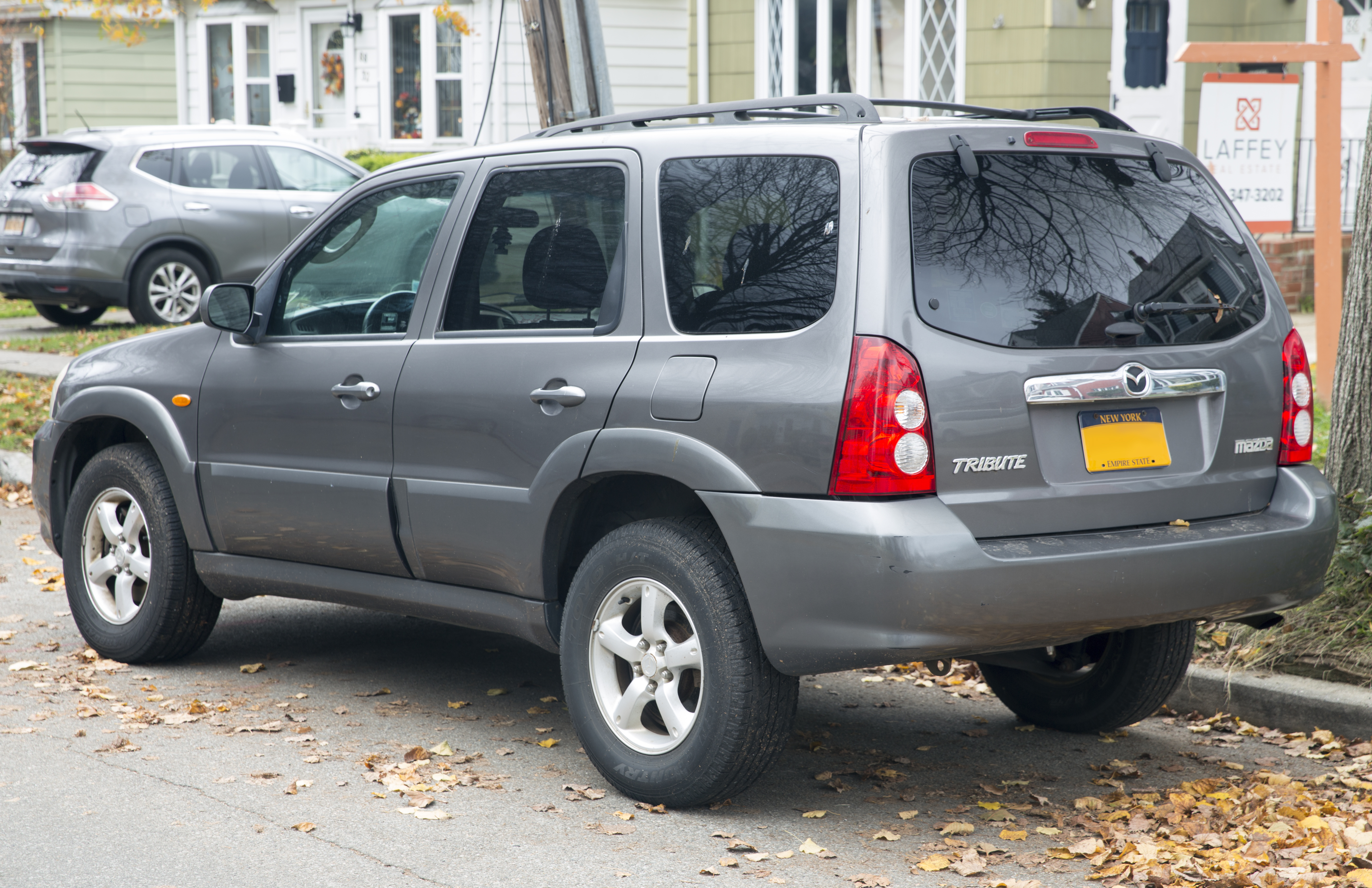
2005 Mazda Tribute (US; facelift)

Both the Escape and Tribute were refreshed in 2004 for the 2005 model year. In Japan, this change took place in December 2003. The base engine became the Mazda 2.3 L MZR inline-four, while the optional V6 remained the 3.0 L Duratec. In North American-built models, a floor-mounted automatic transmission shifter replaced the column shifter; However, Japanese-built models continued with a column shifter. The earlier DX, LX, and ES models were replaced with the Tribute i (four-cylinder) and Tribute s (V6). Also new was the availability of an automatic transmission coupled to the four-cylinder engine.

Japanese buyers only received a single V6-engined model, as the more powerful four-cylinder engine made the thirsty V6 somewhat superfluous. The V6 came only as a four-wheel drive "Field Break" model. The inline-four was available as an LX (also with front-wheel drive), FB-X, or Field Break. This lineup continued until Japanese sales ended in March 2006 and it was replaced with the similarly sized CX-7.

Engine options:

- 2.3 L L3 I4, 153 hp (114 kW)/206 N·m (152 lb·ft)
- 3.0 L AJ V6, 200 hp (149 kW)/261 N·m (193 lb·ft)

=== 2006 (Asia-Pacific) ===
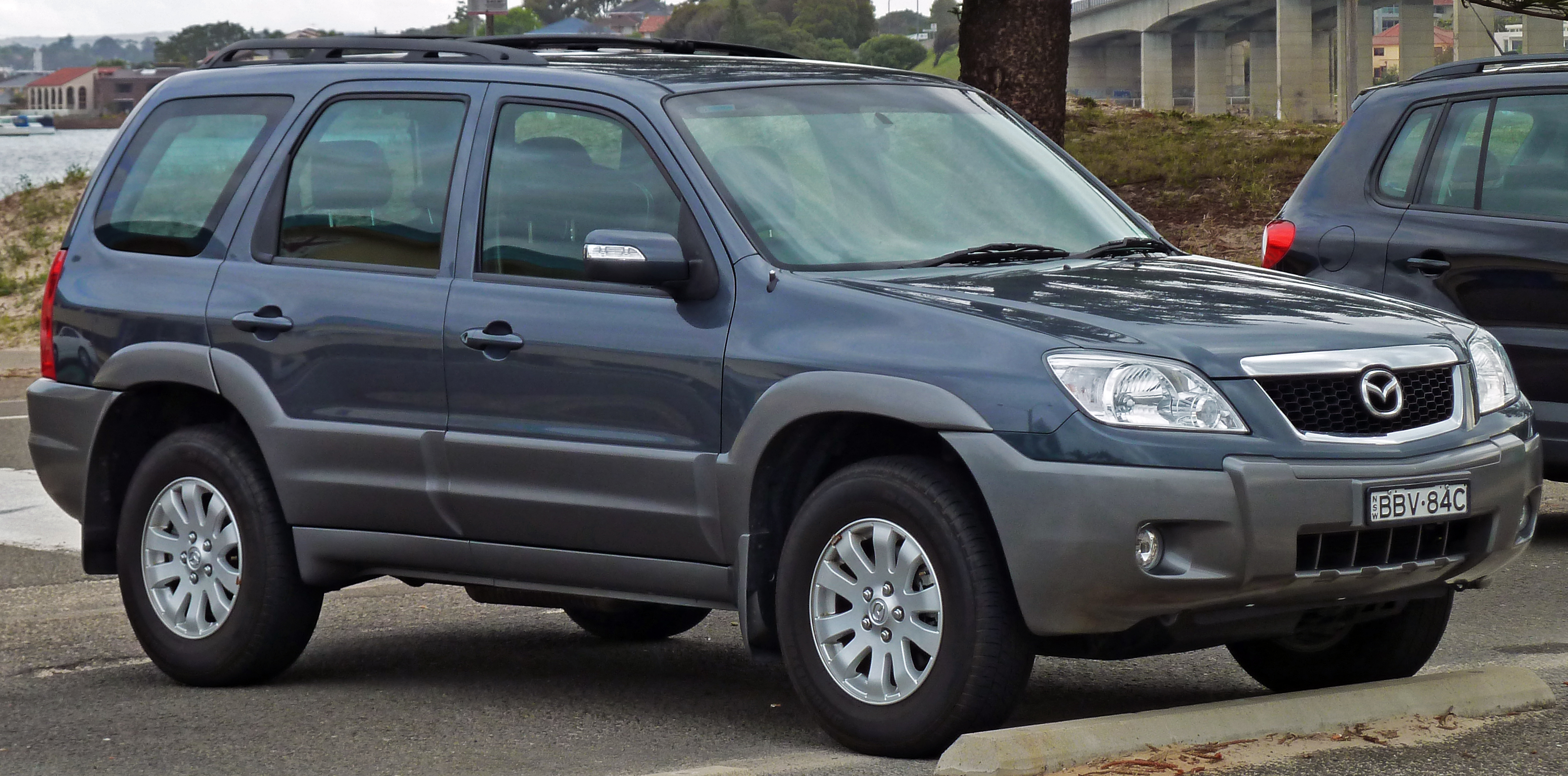
2006–2008 Mazda Tribute (Australia)

A significantly facelifted version of the Tribute was released in the second half of 2006 for Asia Pacific markets. The updated Tribute featured a larger, bolder grille, with an enlarged Mazda emblem, as well as restyled front bumper and headlights. Side mirrors featured integrated indicators.

On the inside, changes included a new floor-mounted automatic transmission shifter, in place of the old column shifter (Asia-Pacific model only; US-built Tribute gained the floor shifter in 2005). The dashboard was updated with a new radio, and automatic electronic climate control on certain models. Mechanically, the rear drum brakes were replaced by disc brakes. Engines remain the same, but the V6 has been modified to reduce fuel consumption by over 10%, while the 4-cylinder has improved mid-range torque and an electronic throttle. Both engines had been certified to meet Euro III emission regulations.

In 2008, Mazda Australia also discontinued the Tribute, its absence filled by the CX-7 introduced in the previous year. For other Asia-Pacific markets, production was shifted to the Ford Lio Ho plant in Jhongli, Taiwan, which also produces Tribute's Ford Escape twin for Asia-Pacific markets. This arrangement continued until early 2010, when the Tribute for the Asia-Pacific markets ceased production, being fully replaced by the CX-7 imported from Japan.

=== Safety ===
ANCAP test results Mazda Tribute variants with dual frontal airbags (2001)
| Test | Score |
|---|---|
| Overall | 4 /5 stars |
| Frontal offset | 8.67/16 |
| Side impact | 16/16 |
| Pole | Not Assessed |
| Seat belt reminders | 0/3 |
| Whiplash protection | Not Assessed |
| Pedestrian protection | Poor |
| Electronic stability control | Not Available |

ANCAP test results Mazda Tribute variants with side airbags (2004)
| Test | Score |
|---|---|
| Overall | 4 /5 stars |
| Frontal offset | 8.67/16 |
| Side impact | 16/16 |
| Pole | 0/2 |
| Seat belt reminders | 0/3 |
| Whiplash protection | Not Assessed |
| Pedestrian protection | Poor |
| Electronic stability control | Not Available |

== Second generation (2007) ==
Second generation
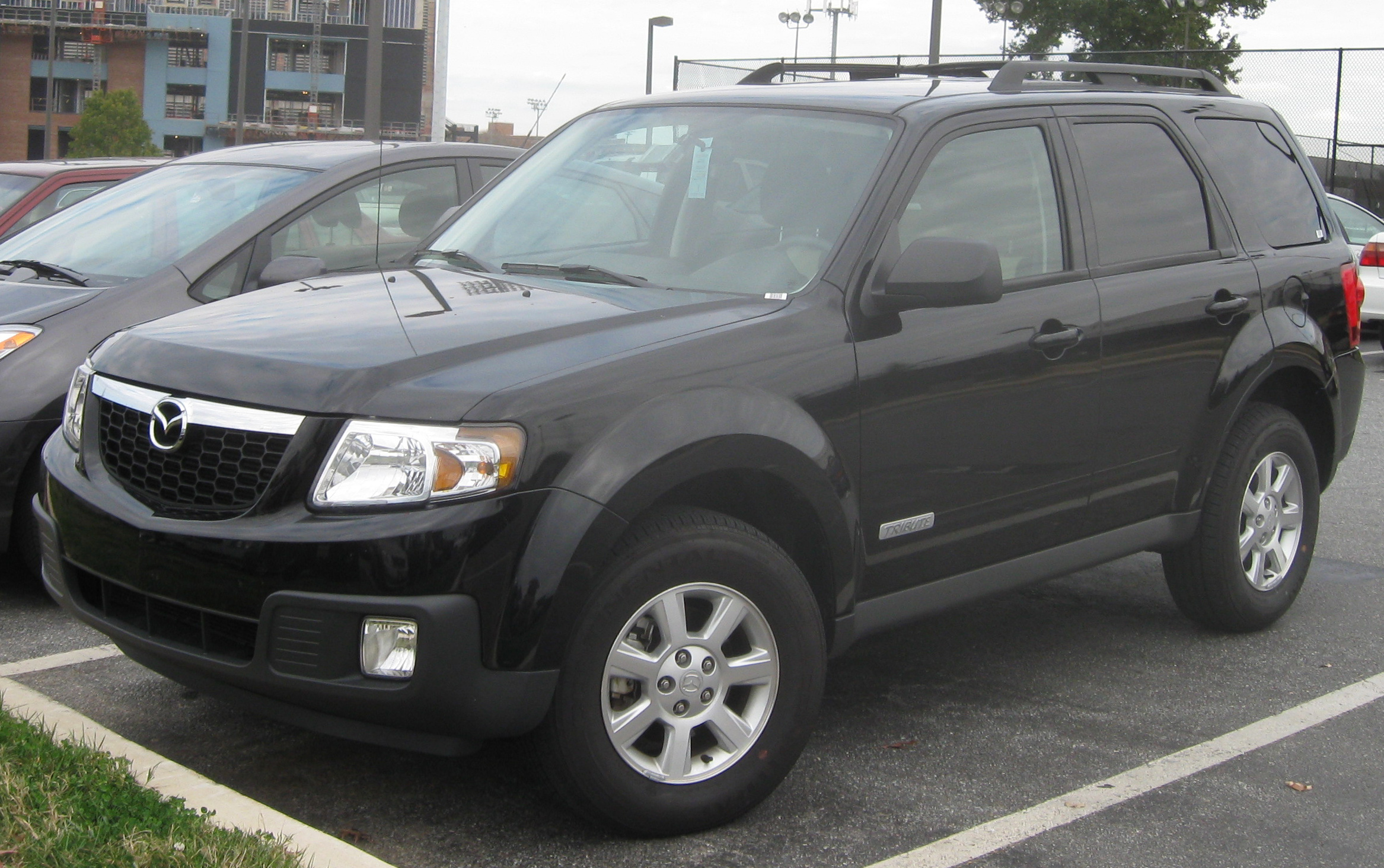

Overview
- Production: January 2007 – November 2011
- Model years: 2008–2011
- Assembly: Claycomo, Missouri, United States

Powertrain
- Engine: Gasoline: 2.3 L L3-VE I4; 2.5 L L5-VE I4; 3.0 L AJ V6; Gasoline Hybrid: 2.5 L Atkinson cycle I4
- Transmission: 5-speed manual; 4-speed automatic; 6-speed automatic (from MY2009)

Dimensions
- Length: 174.9 in (4,442 mm)
- Width: 71.1 in (1,806 mm)
- Height: 70.2 in (1,783 mm); Hybrid: 70.0 in (1,778 mm); 2008-09 FWD: 67.7 in (1,720 mm); 2010-12 FWD: 67.9 in (1,725 mm)

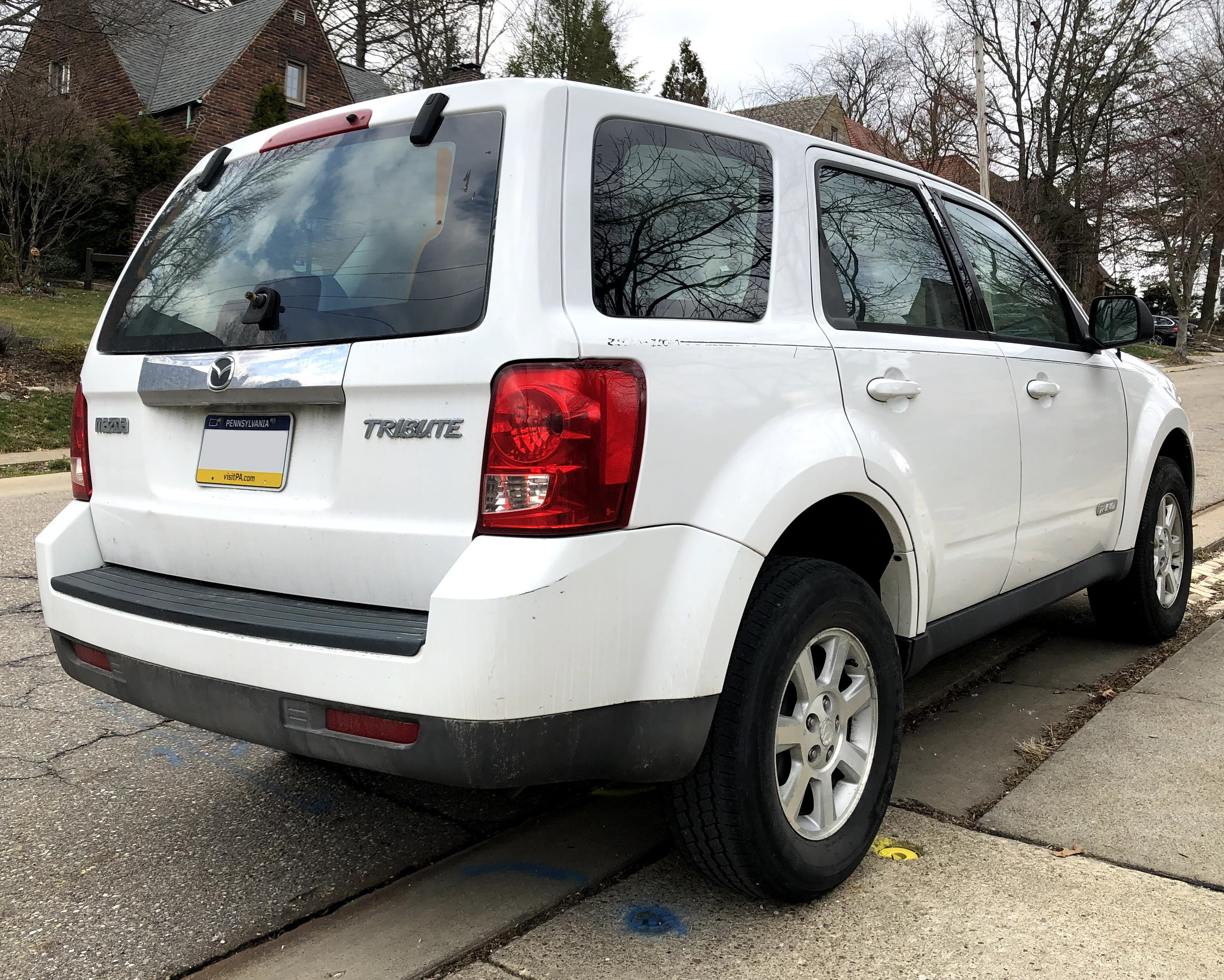
Rear view

In 2007 for the 2008 model year, the Tribute was significantly revamped, like its Ford Escape and Mercury Mariner siblings. Originally set to be renamed the Mazda CX-5, the vehicle kept the Tribute name. The changes were significant, but fell short of a "clean sheet" redesign, as the vehicles remained on the CD2 platform, and kept the existing 2.3 L L5-VE inline-four and 3.0 L AJ V6 engines. Visible changes included all new sheet metal and interior. The interior was significantly upgraded using all new components and higher quality materials, and was generally praised by automotive journalists. However, unlike the first generation of the Tribute, which had unique exterior and interior from its siblings, the new model only differs from its siblings in the "nose" (front fenders, hood, and front fascia), tail lights and detailing. Notable changes to the exterior include a higher belt line and more pronounced wheel arches. Overall the car was designed to look larger and more substantial than the previous model. As a cost-saving measure, rear drum brakes, replaced the previous discs, to criticism from the automotive press.

The 2008 Tribute (non-hybrid) was first unveiled at the 2007 Montreal International Auto Show and went on sale in March 2007.

A new addition was the Hybrid model which was previously only available on the Ford Escape and Mercury Mariner.

The Tribute received additional major changes to improve performance for the 2009 model year, mostly by way of mechanical upgrades. Most significant were all new engines; Mazda's new 2.5 L L5-VE I4 replaced the 2.3, boosting horsepower to 171 bhp (128 kW; 173 PS) and 171 lb⋅ft (232 N⋅m) of torque at 4000 rpm. Despite increased horsepower, fuel economy also increased by 1 mpg_{‑US} (240 L/100 km; 1.2 mpg_{‑imp}) on both urban and extra-urban cycles. The optional 3.0 L (AJ) V6 was updated, resulting in a 40 hp (30 kW) increase, bringing output to 240 hp (180 kW) and 233 lb⋅ft (316 N⋅m) of torque. It also brought a 1 mpg improvement in fuel economy.

Another significant change was the switch to Ford's new 6F 6-speed automatic, which became standard on all V6 equipped models and optional on the four-cylinder versions. As well, new front and 18.5 mm (0.73 in) rear stabilizer bars were added for 2009 to improve ride handling after complaints about diminished performance following the 2008 changes. Others changes included redesigned seats, daytime running lamps, optional steering-mounted audio controls, and other additional features. The Tribute was discontinued at the end of the 2011 model year, replaced by the Mazda CX-5 in 2012.

== Sales ==
Within Australia, the Tribute was initially a popular choice of SUV, where it only trailed the likes of the Toyota RAV4, Honda CR-V, Nissan X-Trail, and the Subaru Forester. Whilst other territories around the world saw the Ford variant stand dominant, it was Mazda's Tribute that was victorious in Australia by a factor of nearly 2 to 1, consistent with Mazda being a stronger brand in Australia relative to other Western markets.

| Year | Australian Sales | Australian Rank |
|---|---|---|
| 2001 | 6,638 | 30 |
| 2002 | 6,828 | 30 |
| 2003 | 6,394 | 36 |
| 2004 | 5,426 | 46 |
| 2005 | N/A | N/A |
| 2006 | N/A | N/A |
| 2007 | N/A | N/A |
| 2008 | 9 | 262 |
