= Mercury Mariner =

Compact crossover SUV

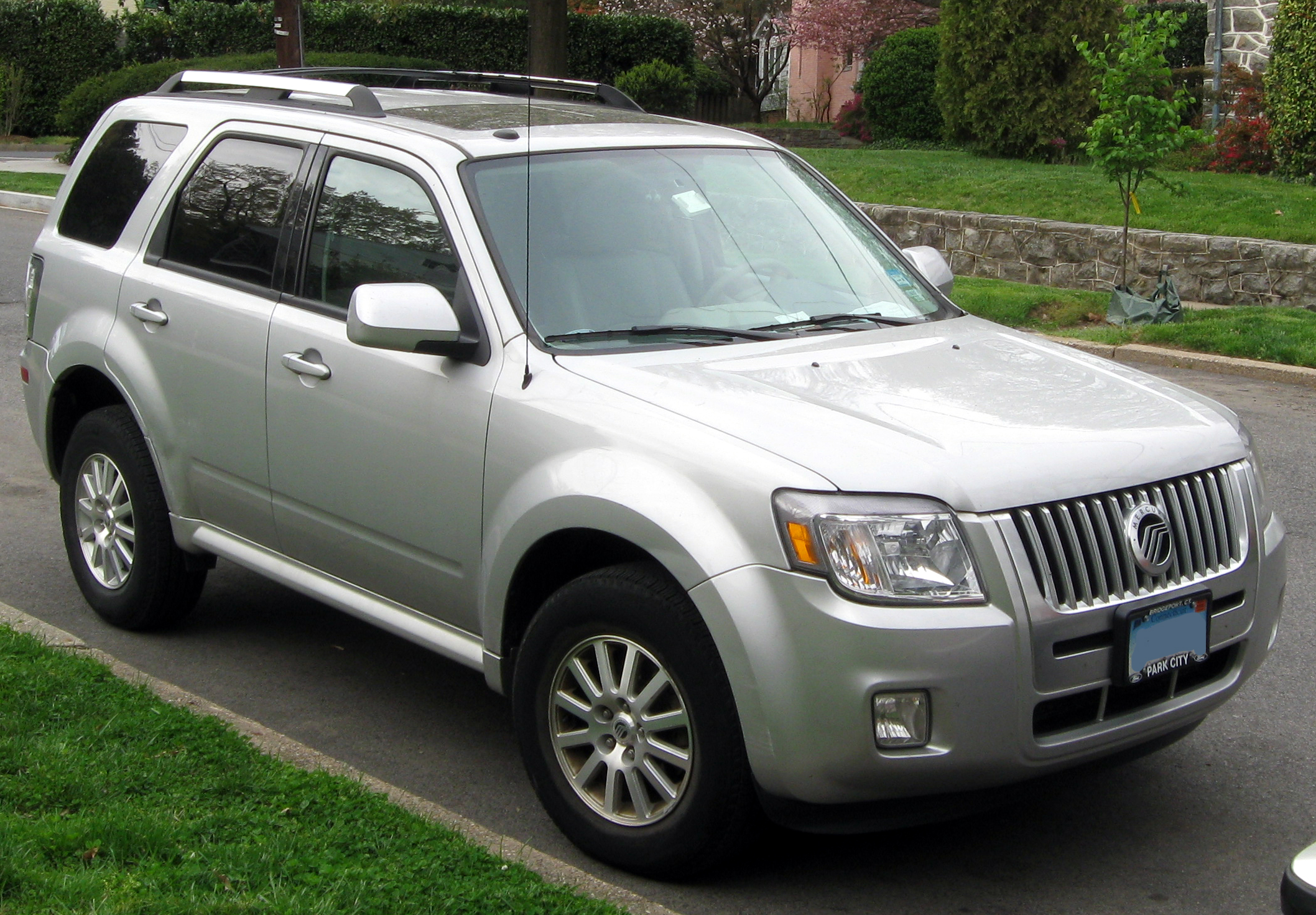

Overview
- Manufacturer: Mercury (Ford)
- Production: 2004–2010
- Model years: 2005–2011

Body and chassis
- Class: Compact crossover SUV
- Body style: 5-door SUV
- Layout: Front engine, front-wheel drive / four-wheel drive
- Platform: Ford CD2 platform
- Related: Mazda Tribute; Ford Escape

Powertrain
- Engine: Gasoline: 2.3 L I4; 3.0 L V6; Gasoline Hybrid: 2.5 L Atkinson cycle I4
- Transmission: 4-speed automatic 6-speed automatic

Dimensions
- Wheelbase: 103.1 in (2,619 mm)

Chronology
- Successor: Lincoln MKC

The Mercury Mariner is a compact crossover SUV that was introduced for the 2005 model year. It is a sibling of the Mazda Tribute and Ford Escape, although it is more upmarket than the other two. The Mariner is Mercury's first car-based SUV, and is slotted below the Mountaineer in the lineup. When Ford eliminated the Mercury brand, the Mariner ended production in October 2010.

The Mariner was officially offered in the United States, Mexico, Saudi Arabia, Kuwait, and the United Arab Emirates.

== First generation (2005–2007) ==
First generation
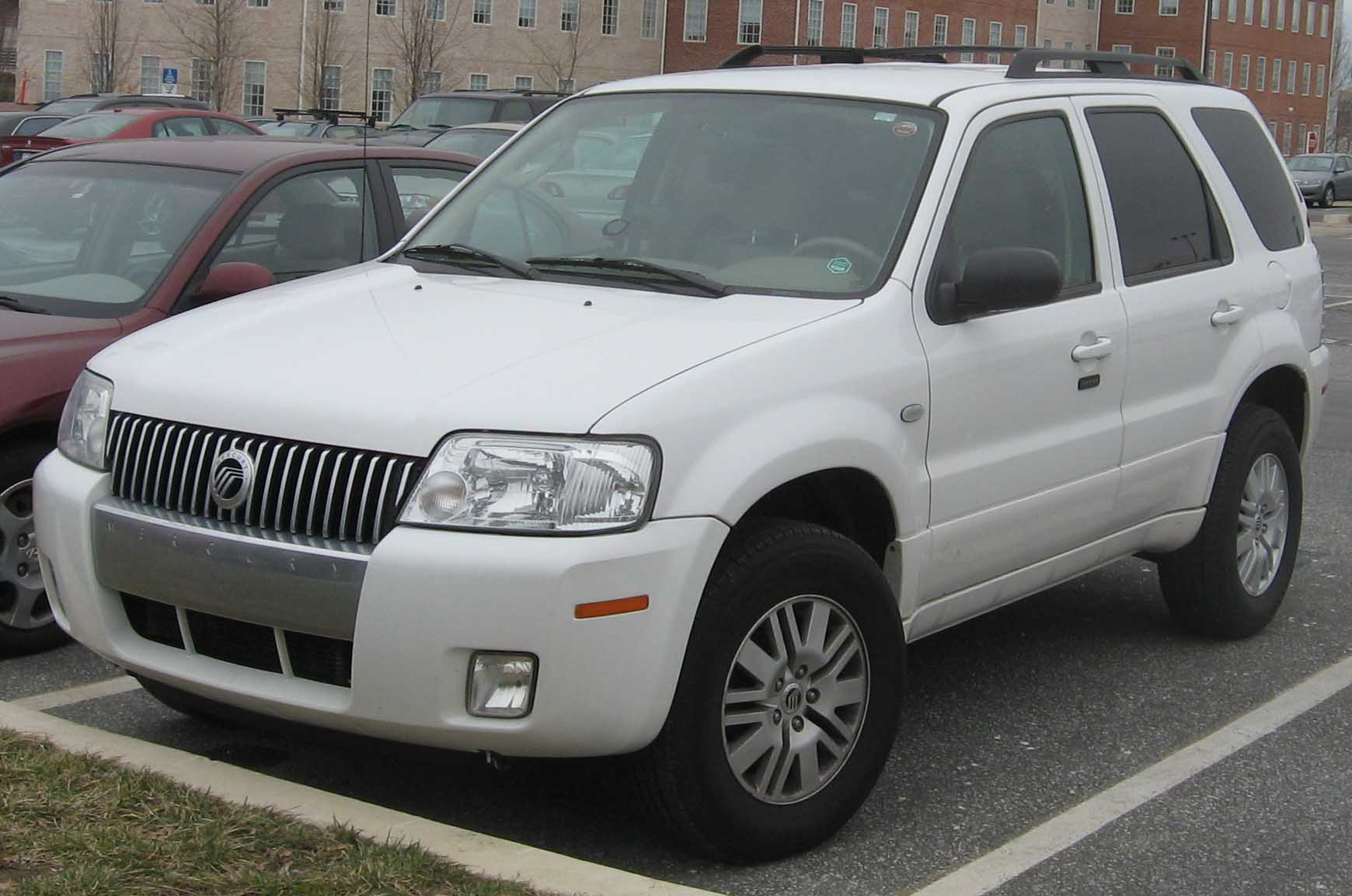

Overview
- Production: August 2004 – December 2006
- Model years: 2005–2007
- Assembly: Claycomo, Missouri; Avon Lake, Ohio

Dimensions
- Length: 174.9 in (4,442 mm)
- Width: 70.1 in (1,781 mm)
- Height: 69.7 in (1,770 mm); Hybrid: 70.4 in (1,788 mm)

Introduced during the 2005 refresh of the Ford Escape, the Mercury Mariner was positioned above both it and the Mazda Tribute in the compact sport utility vehicle group. It also includes stylistic differences, such as a two-tone interior, turn signal repeaters borrowed from the European-market Ford Maverick, monotone cladding, and the signature Mercury "waterfall" front grille. Unlike its counterparts, a manual transmission was not part of the powertrain lineup. The Mariner was the first Mercury with a four-cylinder since the Mercury Cougar was dropped in 2002. For 2006, the lineup was expanded with the introduction of the Mariner Hybrid.

== Second generation (2008–2011) ==
Second generation
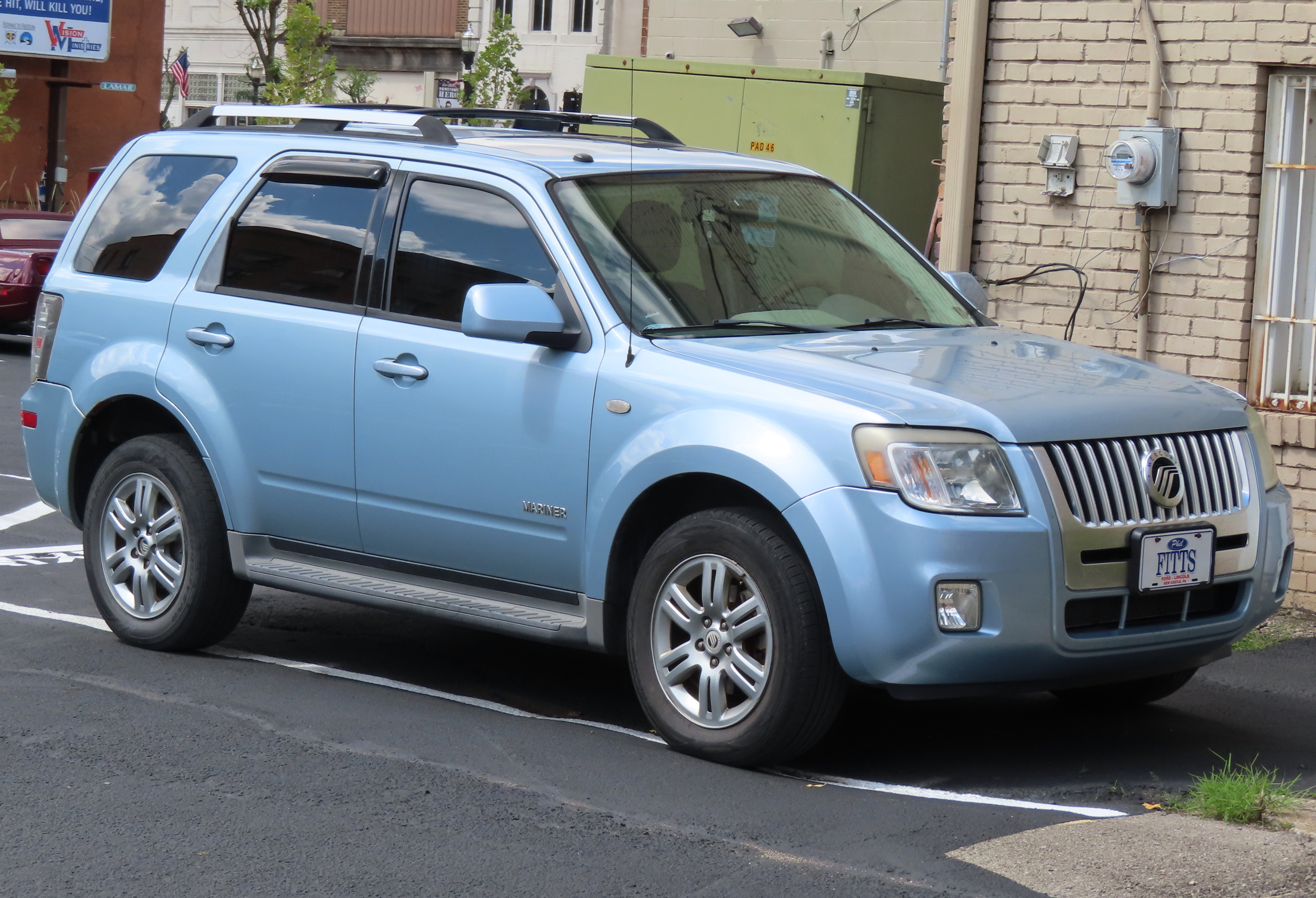

Overview
- Production: November 2006 – October 2010
- Model years: 2008–2011
- Assembly: Claycomo, Missouri (KCAP)

Dimensions
- Length: 2008: 175.2 in (4,450 mm); 2009: 174.7 in (4,437 mm); 2010: 175.1 in (4,448 mm)
- Width: 71.1 in (1,806 mm)
- Height: 68.8 in (1,748 mm); Premier: 70.0 in (1,778 mm); Hybrid: 67.7 in (1,720 mm)

For the second generation for the Mariner, the 2008 model year boasted a thorough redesign, despite remaining on the Ford CD2 platform used by the outgoing generation.

The exterior changes included new seats, headlights, taillights, a new liftgate, a higher beltline, new doors, and new wheels. The interior was also significantly updated with higher quality materials and included more features. The engines remained the same but the 3.0 L Duratec V6 has been modified to reduce fuel consumption by 10%.

Mariner and its Ford Escape sibling were the first vehicles to feature Ford's pull-drift steering compensation, an enhancement made possible by applying software control to the Electric Power Steering (EPS) system.

The first 2008 Mercury Mariner was unveiled at the South Florida International Auto Show on October 6, 2006, and was touted as a new direction for the Mercury brand.

=== 2009 changes ===
The 2009 Ford Escape and Mercury Mariner were unveiled at the 2008 Washington Auto Show. Sporting a 2.5-liter engine and 6-speed automatic transmission that replaced the four-speed automatic transmission, the new powertrain improved the EPA fuel economy by 1 mile per gallon and increased power by 11% to 170 horsepower (130 kW). The existing 3.0-liter Duratec V6 was bumped from 200 hp (150 kW) to 240 hp (180 kW).

The new 4-cylinder engine was also used in Ford's Escape Hybrid and Mercury Mariner Hybrid. “For every eight Escape and Mariner vehicles we sell, one of them is a hybrid, and the appeal is growing,” says Sue Ciscke, Ford senior vice president, Sustainability, Environment and Safety Engineering.

=== 2010 changes ===
For the 2010 model year, the Mariner added Ford's MyKey and trailer sway controls as standard on all trim levels. The Mariner also saw the addition of Flex-Fuel, the ability to run using E85 fuel or regular unleaded gasoline with the V6 engine. Mercury removed the Euro-style turn signal repeaters for this model year.

=== 2011 changes ===
For the 2011 model year, the Mariner featured HD Radio as a standard, but continued with the same features as the 2010 models. This version of the Mariner was its last, as Ford discontinued the Mercury brand due to declining sales. Ford ended production of the Mariner in October 2010.

The last Mariner was assembled on October 5, 2010.

== Variants ==
=== Hybrid ===
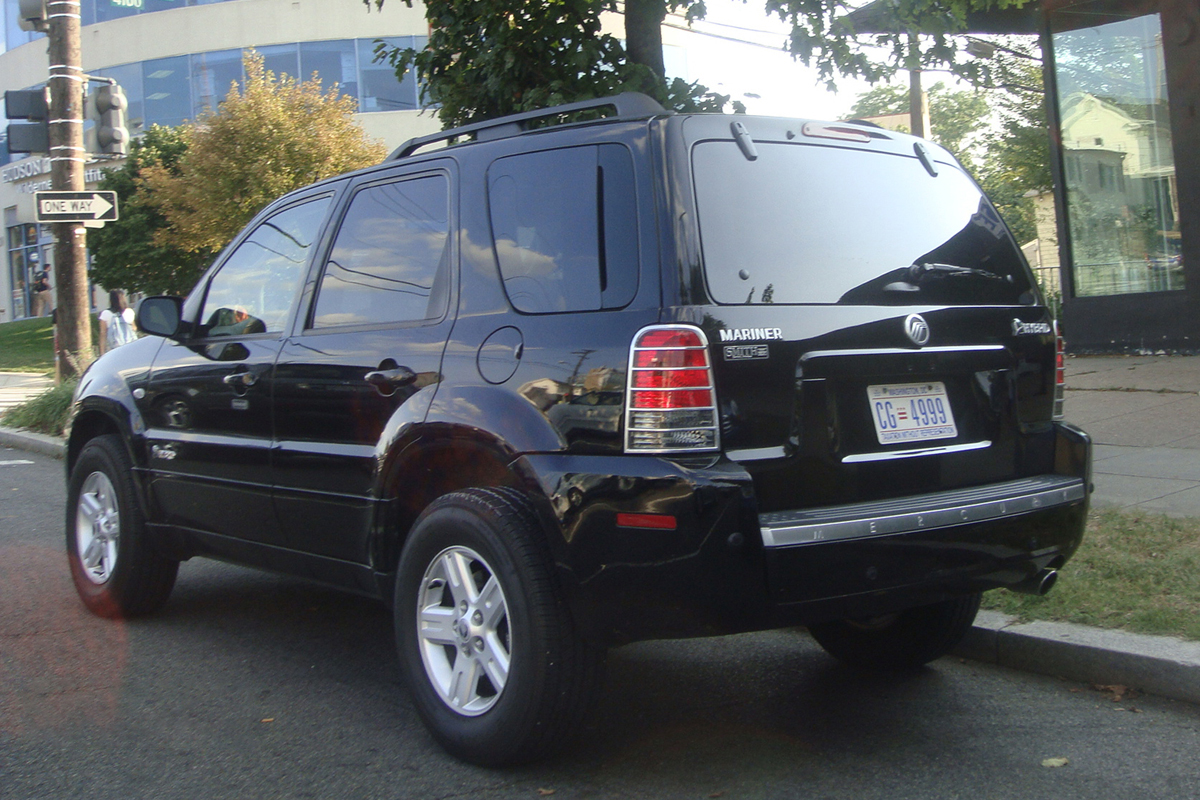
Mercury Mariner Hybrid

The Mariner Hybrid powertrain was identical to its sibling, the Ford Escape Hybrid. It was launched to the U.S. market in 2006 and was discontinued in 2010 with the rest of the brand. The Mariner hybrid sold a total of 12,300 units.

Like the Ford Escape Hybrid, the Mariner Hybrid is a "full" hybrid electric system, meaning the system can switch automatically between pure electric power, pure gasoline engine power, or a combination of electric battery and gasoline engine operating together, for maximum performance and efficiency at all speeds and loads. When braking or decelerating, the Mariner's hybrid system uses regenerative braking, where the electric drive motor becomes a generator, converting the vehicle's momentum back to electricity for storage in the batteries. With 155 hp (116 kW), the Mariner Hybrid has nearly the same acceleration performance as the conventional 200 hp (150 kW) V6 Mariner. Again, just like the Escape Hybrid, it gets a respectable average of 34 miles per US gallon (6.9 L/100 km; 41 mpg_{‑imp}) and is sometimes said to be the most fuel efficient sport utility vehicle on the road.

=== Presidential Edition ===
On September 7, 2006, Ford delivered a special "Presidential Edition" Mercury Mariner Hybrid to former President Bill Clinton. Its custom features include:

- LED lighting
- A 120 V outlet
- Rear bucket seats
- Center console & rear seat fold-out writing desks
- Personal DVD players for each seat
- Refrigerator
- Increased rear seat legroom

There have also been several undisclosed security modifications made to the vehicle.

== Awards ==
- Consumers Digest best buy for 2005, 2006, 2007.
- Mercury Mariner Hybrid was awarded 2006 Green Car of the Year.

== Sales ==
Calendar Year	American sales
2004	7,171
2005	34,099
2006	33,941
2007	34,844
2008	32,306
2009	28,688
2010	29,912

== See also ==
List of hybrid vehicles
