= Kansas City Assembly Plant =

Ford Motor Company factory in Missouri, US

Coordinates: 39.202329°N 94.480534°W

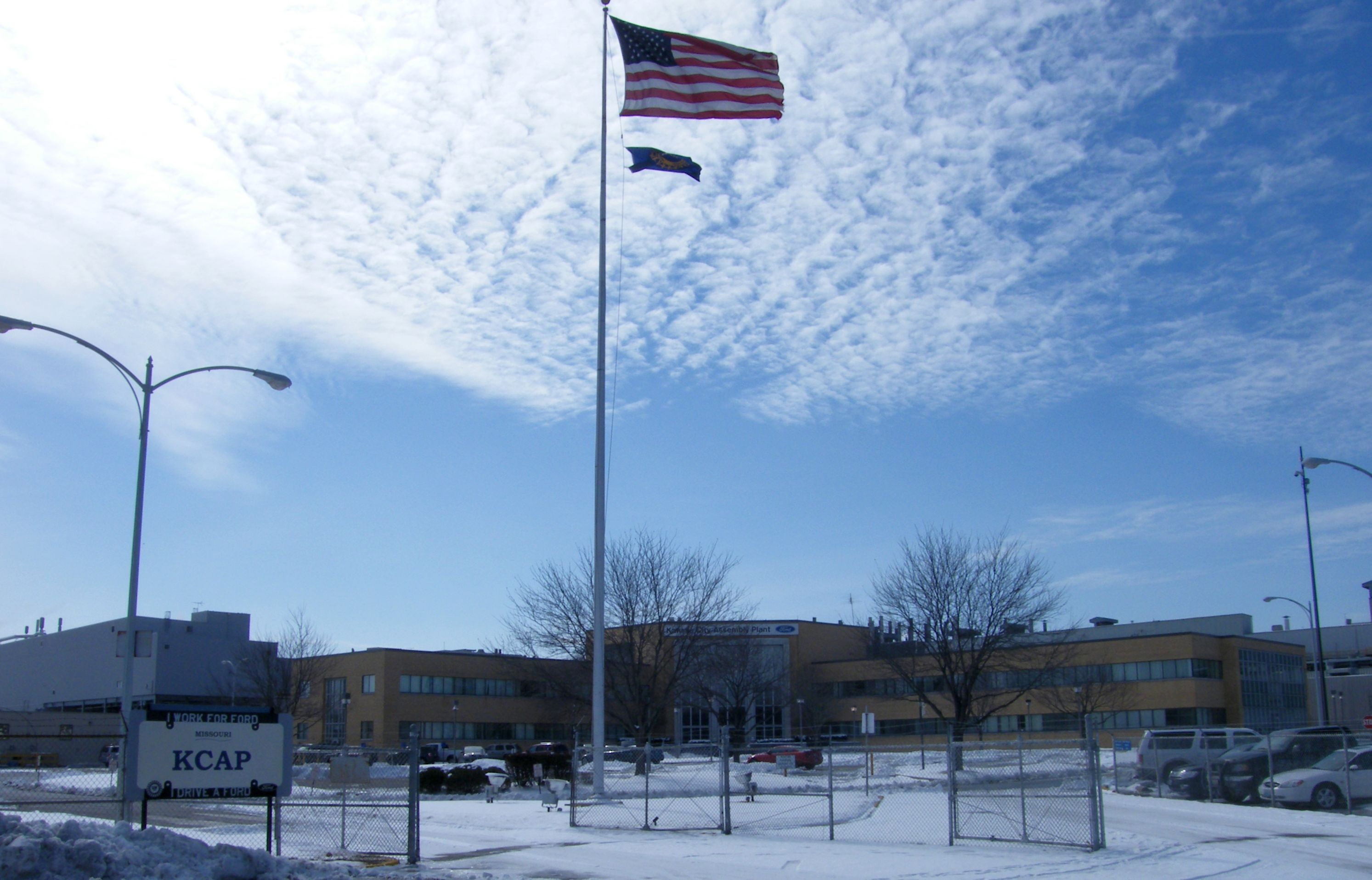

- Location within Missouri
- Built: 1951–1953
- Operated: 1953–present
- Location: 8121 U.S. 69; Claycomo, Missouri, United States
- Industry: Automotive
- Products: Ford F-Series; Ford Transit
- Employees: 9,456
- Area: 1,269 acres (514 ha)
- Volume: 4,700,000 square feet (440,000 m^{2})
- Owner: Ford Motor Company
- Website: KCAP at Ford.com

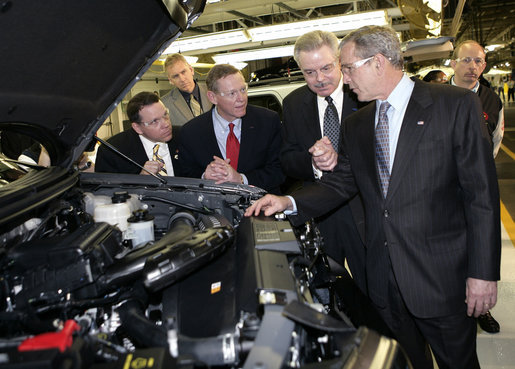
US President George W. Bush visited the plant on March 20, 2007, to tout new hybrid cars and his energy policy.

Kansas City Assembly Plant (KCAP) is a Ford Motor Company automobile assembly facility which produces the Ford F-150 and the Ford Transit. It is located in Claycomo, Missouri, United States, about 10 miles (16 km) northeast of downtown Kansas City, Missouri. It consists of 4.7 million square feet (440,000 m^{2}) of production space and employs approximately 9,456 hourly workers represented by the United Auto Workers Local 249.

== History ==
The plant was opened on February 18, 1953 (after the ground was broken on January 9, 1951) to manufacture wings for the B-47 Stratojet military bomber, and was later converted for mass-market automotive assembly on August 1, 1956. The first F-Series trucks rolled off the assembly line on January 7, 1957, after the company closed its older Winchester Avenue assembly plant in December 1956.

The 4,700,000-square-foot (440,000 m^{2}) on 1,270 acres (5.1 km^{2}) facility employs 9,021 people as of April, 2024. In addition to the main final assembly plant, KCAP also includes a stamping plant for the Ford Transit, a separate body shop and a separate paint shop for the Ford F-150.

In December 2010, Ford announced moving production of the Ford Escape and Ford Escape Hybrid to the Louisville Assembly Plant, which underwent US$600 million in renovations. The move stirred fears that it could result in the loss of half the jobs at the 3,700-person plant.

The Government of Missouri had been anticipating changes at the plant. In 2010, the state passed the Missouri Manufacturing Jobs Act providing tax incentives for companies that invest in plants in the state by allowing them to keep employee withholding taxes. While the bill would benefit all industrial businesses it was specifically targeting the plant and was introduced by Missouri State Representative Jerry Nolte, whose district includes the plant. The bill could enable Ford to save $150 million across ten years by investing in the plant. The bill had been the subject of a filibuster by Missouri State Senator Chuck Purgason who objected to the favoritism extended to Ford and read aloud sections of Allan W. Eckert's The Frontiersman into the record.

In 2011, Ford said it would spend $1.1 billion on additions and upgrades, including a new stamping plant. In 2012, it was announced that the plant would be the North American lead production site for the new Ford Transit, which replaced the discontinued Ford E-Series vans.

== Products made ==
=== Current ===
- Ford Transit (2014–present)
- Ford F-Series (1957–present)

=== Former ===
These are discontinued from this plant.

- Mercury Mariner (2005–2011)
- Lincoln Blackwood (2002)
- Ford Escape (2001–2012)
- Mazda Tribute (2001–2011)
- Mercury Mystique (1995–2000)
- Ford Contour (1995–2000)
- Mercury Topaz (1984–1994)
- Ford Tempo (1984–1994)
- Mercury Zephyr (1978–1983)
- Ford Fairmont (1978–1983)
- Ford Maverick (1970–1977)
- Mercury Meteor (1961–1963)
- Mercury Comet (1960–1977)
- Ford Falcon (1960–1970)
- Ford Fairlane (1955–1961)
