= Claycomo, Missouri =

- Village
- Location of Claycomo, Missouri
- Coordinates: 39°11′55″N 94°28′44″W
- Country: United States
- State: Missouri
- County: Clay
- Incorporated: 1946

Area
  - Total: 2.60 sq mi (6.74 km^{2})
  - Land: 2.60 sq mi (6.74 km^{2})
  - Water: 0 sq mi (0.00 km^{2})
- Elevation: 807 ft (246 m)

Population (2020)
  - Total: 1,343
  - Density: 516.4/sq mi (199.37/km^{2})
- Time zone: UTC-6 (Central (CST))
  - Summer (DST): UTC-5 (CDT)
- ZIP code: 64119
- Area code: 816
- FIPS code: 29-14554
- GNIS feature ID: 2397638
- Website: www.claycomo.org

Claycomo is a village in Clay County, Missouri, United States, as part of the Kansas City metropolitan area. Its name is a portmanteau of "Clay County, MO". The population was 1,343 at the 2020 census. Ford Motor Company owns the Kansas City Assembly Plant (KCAP) in Claycomo.

== Geography ==
According to the United States Census Bureau, the village has a total area of 2.55 square miles (6.60 km^{2}), all land.

== Demographics ==
Historical population
Census	Pop.	Note	%±
1950	808		—
1960	1,423		76.1%
1970	1,841		29.4%
1980	1,671		−9.2%
1990	1,668		−0.2%
2000	1,267		−24.0%
2010	1,430		12.9%
2020	1,343		−6.1%
U.S. Decennial Census

=== Racial and ethnic composition ===
Claycomo village, Missouri – Racial and ethnic composition Note: the US Census treats Hispanic/Latino as an ethnic category. This table excludes Latinos from the racial categories and assigns them to a separate category. Hispanics/Latinos may be of any race.
Race / Ethnicity (NH = Non-Hispanic)	Pop 2000	Pop 2010	Pop 2020	% 2000	% 2010	% 2020
White alone (NH)	1,177	1,319	1,045	92.90%	92.24%	77.81%
Black or African American alone (NH)	28	12	46	2.21%	0.84%	3.43%
Native American or Alaska Native alone (NH)	5	5	5	0.39%	0.35%	0.37%
Asian alone (NH)	8	8	16	0.63%	0.56%	1.19%
Native Hawaiian or Pacific Islander alone (NH)	0	1	5	0.00%	0.07%	0.37%
Other race alone (NH)	0	0	2	0.00%	0.00%	0.15%
Mixed race or Multiracial (NH)	19	14	108	1.50%	0.98%	8.04%
Hispanic or Latino (any race)	30	71	116	2.37%	4.97%	8.64%
Total	1,267	1,430	1,343	100.00%	100.00%	100.00%

=== 2010 census ===
As of the census of 2010, 1,430 people, 672 households, and 369 families resided in the village. The population density was 560.8 inhabitants per square mile (216.5/km^{2}). The 759 housing units averaged 297.6 per square mile (114.9/km^{2}). The racial makeup of the village was 95.1% White, 0.8% African American, 0.4% Native American, 0.6% Asian, 0.1% Pacific Islander, 1.7% from other races, and 1.3% from two or more races. Hispanics or Latinos of any race were 5.0% of the population.

Of the 672 households, 21.1% had children under the age of 18 living with them, 35.7% were married couples living together, 12.4% had a female householder with no husband present, 6.8% had a male householder with no wife present, and 45.1% were not families. About 38.2% of all households were made up of individuals, and 13.1% had someone living alone who was 65 years of age or older. The average household size was 2.13 and the average family size was 2.75.

The median age in the village was 45 years. Around 16.6% of residents were under the age of 18, 8.2% were between the ages of 18 and 24, 25.1% were from 25 to 44, 32.6% were from 45 to 64, and 17.6% were 65 years of age or older. The gender makeup of the village was 52.0% male and 48.0% female.

=== 2000 census ===
As of the census of 2000, 1,267 people, 596 households, and 345 families resided in the village. The population density was 506.0 inhabitants per square mile (195.4/km^{2}). The median income for a household in the village was $39,271, and for a family was $44,861. Males had a median income of $29,531 versus $23,990 for females. The per capita income for the village was $20,000. About 4.3% of families and 4.7% of the population were below the poverty line, including 10.6% of those under age 18 and 5.7% of those age 65 or over.

== Education ==
North Kansas City School District is the area school district. Gracemore, Maplewood, and Ravenwood elementaries include sections of Claycomo. All of Claycomo is zoned to Maple Park Middle School, and Winnetonka High School.

Metropolitan Community College has the North Kansas City school district in its taxation area.

Claycomo has a public library, a branch of the Mid-Continent Public Library.
