= Ford Fiesta =

Series of subcompact automobiles (1976–2023)

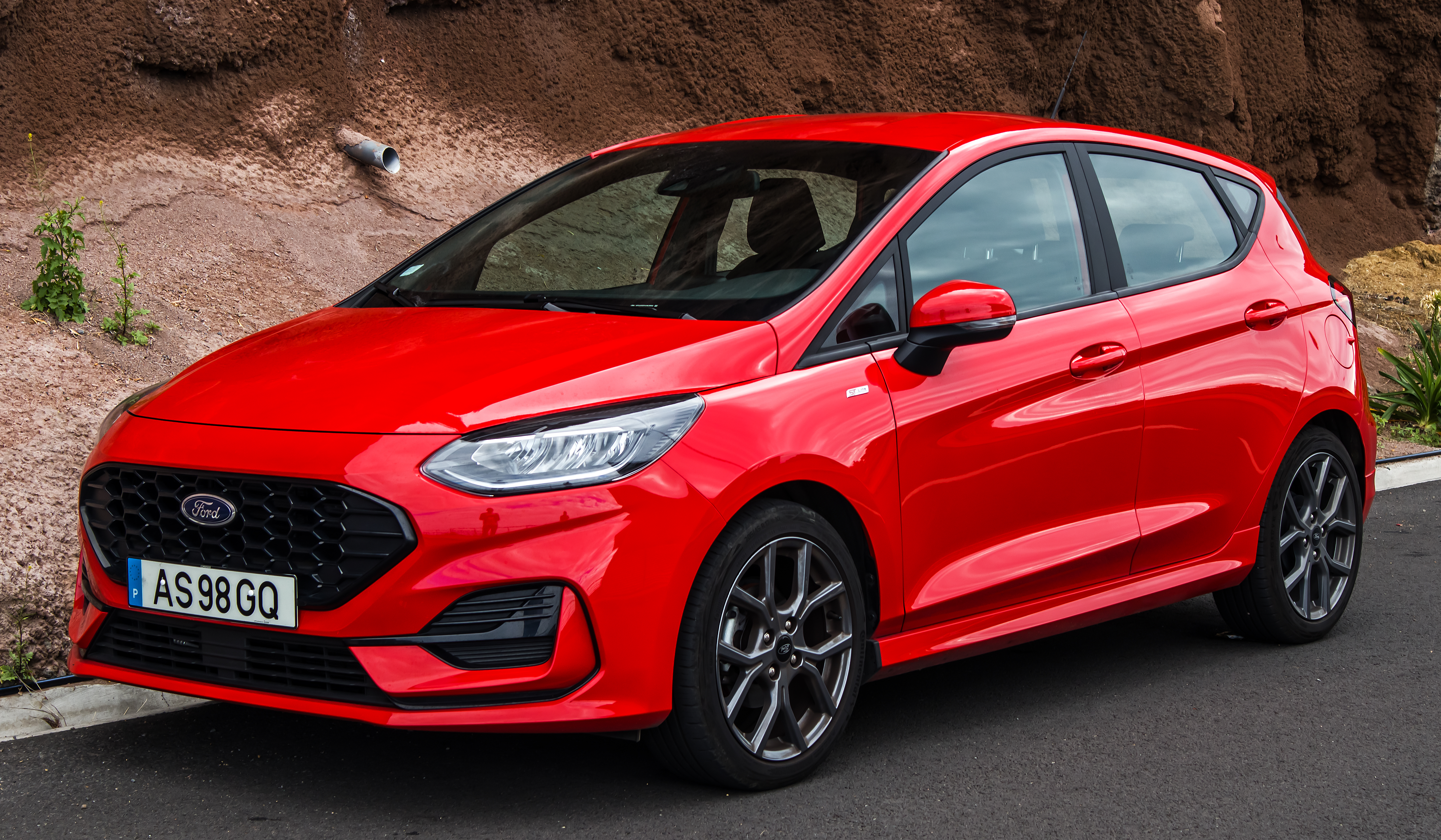

Overview
- Manufacturer: Ford
- Production: June 1976 – July 2023
- Model years: 1978–1980, 2011–2019 (North America)

Body and chassis
- Class: Supermini (B)
- Body style: 3- and 5-door hatchback 4-door sedan/saloon (some countries, Mk4–Mk6 only); 3-door van (Europe only)
- Layout: Front-engine, front-wheel drive

Chronology
- Successor: Ford Puma (electric; indirectly)

The Ford Fiesta is a supermini car that was marketed by Ford from 1976 to 2023 over seven generations. Over the years, the Fiesta has mainly been developed and manufactured by Ford's European operations, and had been positioned below the Escort (later the Focus).

Ford sold over 15 million Fiestas from 1976 to July 2011, making it one of the best-selling Ford nameplates behind the Escort and the F-Series. It has been manufactured in the United Kingdom, Germany, Spain, Brazil, Argentina, Venezuela, Mexico, Taiwan, China, India, Thailand, and South Africa.

By its discontinuation in 2023, Ford had already sold over 22 million units worldwide, making it one of the best-selling automobiles of all time. The final Ford Fiesta rolled off the production line on 7 July 2023. On 10 December 2025, Ford announced a return of the Fiesta in 2028 as an EV in partnership with Renault.

== Development ==
The Fiesta was originally designed by the project "Bobcat" team headed by Trevor Erskine (not to be confused with the badge-engineered Mercury variant of the Ford Pinto) and approved for development by Henry Ford II in September 1972, shortly after the launch of two comparable cars – the Fiat 127 and Renault 5. More than a decade earlier, Ford had decided against producing a new small car to rival BMC's Mini, as the production cost was deemed too high, but the 1973 oil crisis caused a rise in the already growing demand for smaller cars, and the runaway success of the Fiat 127 and Renault 5 was what ultimately convinced Ford to enter the B-segment. In Europe, Ford's arch rival General Motors attempted to address the market need by developing a small hatchback version of its "T-car", which emerged as the 1975 Opel Kadett City and Vauxhall Chevette, but being rear wheel drive, these were not true "superminis" in that they could not deliver the required space efficiency that a transverse engined, front wheel drive package could achieve, this therefore would be template followed by the Fiesta.

The Fiesta was an all new car in the supermini segment, and was the smallest car yet made by Ford. Development targets indicated a production cost US$100 less than the current Escort. The car was to have a wheelbase longer than that of the Fiat 127, but with overall length shorter than that of Ford's Escort. The final proposal was developed by Tom Tjaarda at Ghia, overseen by Ford of Europe's then chief stylist Uwe Bahnsen. The project was approved for production in late 1973, with Ford's engineering centres in Cologne and Dunton (Essex) collaborating.

Ford estimated that 500,000 Fiestas a year would be produced, and built a new factory near Valencia, Spain; factory extensions for the assembly plants in Dagenham, UK. Final assembly also took place in Valencia. As the Fiesta would be Ford's first transverse engined car, a new transaxle was required and a factory near Bordeaux, France was built for this purpose. Since it was known by 1975 that this transmission unit would also be used in the larger Escort when it switched to front wheel drive for its third generation in 1980, enough upward capacity was built into the Bordeaux plant to meet this need.

After years of speculation by the motoring press about Ford's new car, it was subject to a succession of carefully crafted press leaks from the end of 1975. A Fiesta was on display at the Le Mans 24 Hour Race in June 1976, and the car went on sale in France and Germany in September 1976; to the frustration of UK dealerships, right-hand drive versions only began to appear in January 1977. Its initial competitors in Europe, apart from the Fiat 127 and Renault 5, included the Volkswagen Polo and Vauxhall Chevette. Chrysler UK were also about to launch the Sunbeam by this stage, and British Leyland was working on a new supermini, which was launched as the Austin Metro in 1980.

The name "Fiesta" (meaning "party" in Spanish) belonged to General Motors when the car was designed, used as a trim level on Oldsmobile station wagons, and was freely given for Ford to use on their new B-class car. Ford's marketing team had preferred the name "Bravo", but Henry Ford II chose "Fiesta". Ford did end up using the "Bravo" name on a limited edition of the Fiesta Mark I in the early 1980s.

== First generation (1976) ==
First generation
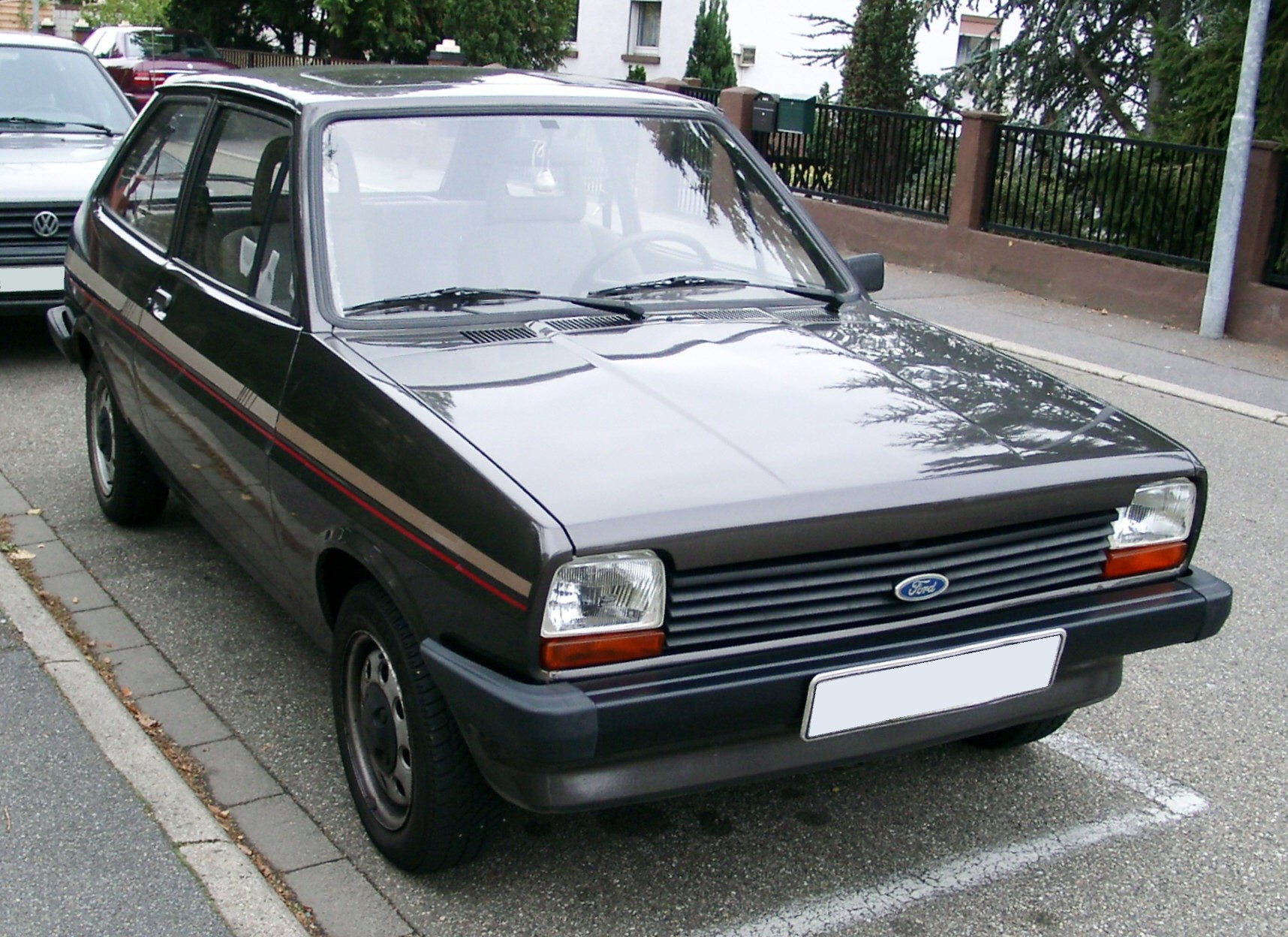

Overview
- Production: 1976–1983

Body and chassis
- Body style: 3-door hatchback 3-door panel van
- Platform: Ford B platform

Dimensions
- Length: 3,565–3,718 mm (140.4–146.4 in)
- Width: 1,567–1,580 mm (61.7–62.2 in)
- Kerb weight: 715–800 kg (1,576–1,764 lb)

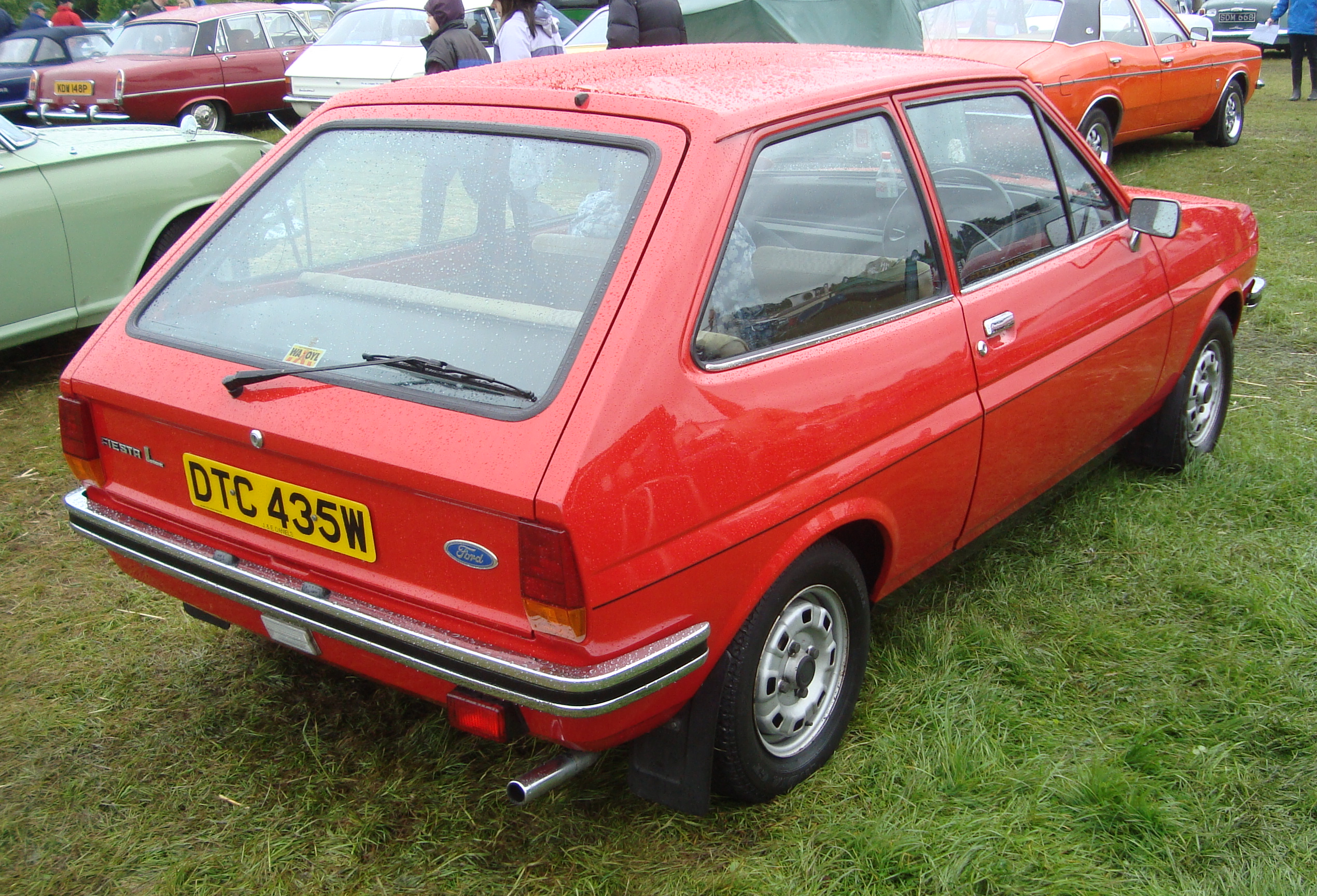
MK1 rear

The Fiesta was initially available in Europe with the Valencia 957 cc (58.4 cu in) Straight-four engine (I4) with high- and low-compression options, and 1,117 cc (68.2 cu in) engines and in Base, Popular, Popular Plus, L, GL (1978 onward), Ghia, and S trim levels, as well as a van. The US Mark I Fiesta was built to slightly different specifications, for model years 1978 through 1980. All US models featured the more powerful 1,596 cc (97.4 cu in) engine, fitted with a catalytic converter and air pump to satisfy strict emission regulations, energy-absorbing bumpers, side-marker lamps, round sealed-beam headlamps, and improved passive safety, as well as optional air conditioning (which was not available in Europe). In the US market, the North American Ford Escort replaced both the Fiesta and the compact Pinto in 1981.

A sporting derivative (1.3 L Supersport) was offered in Europe for the 1980 model year, using the 1.3 L (79 cu in) Kent Crossflow engine, effectively to test the market for the similar XR2 introduced a year later, which featured a 1.6-litre version of the same engine. Black plastic trim was added to the exterior and interior. The small, square headlights were replaced with larger circular ones, with the front indicators being moved into the bumper to accommodate the change.

Minor revisions appeared across the range in late 1981, with larger bumpers to meet crash-worthiness regulations and other small improvements in a bid to maintain showroom appeal ahead of the forthcoming second generation.

== Second generation (1983) ==
Second generation
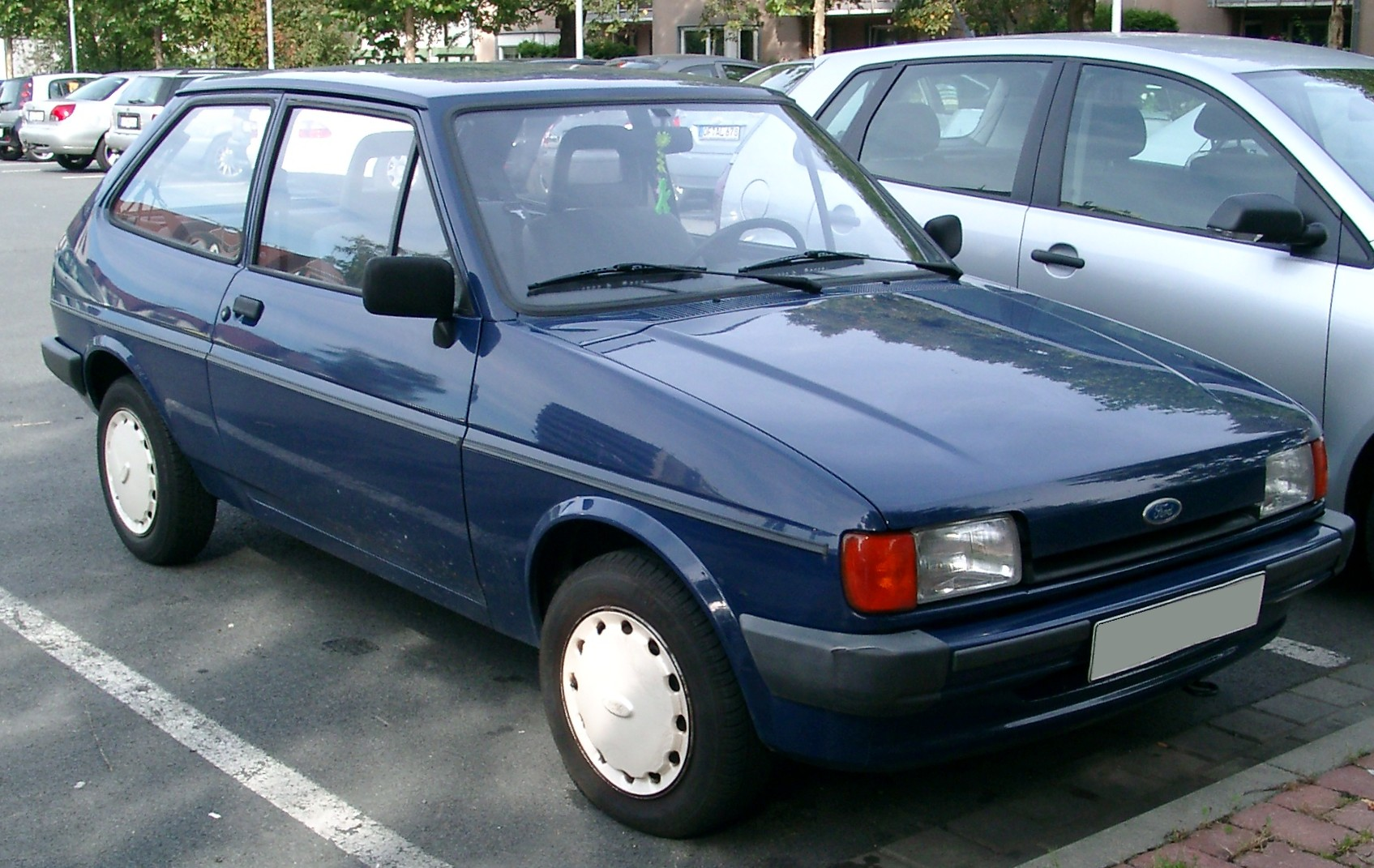

Overview
- Production: 1983–1989

Body and chassis
- Body style: 3-door hatchback; 3-door panel van
- Platform: Ford B platform

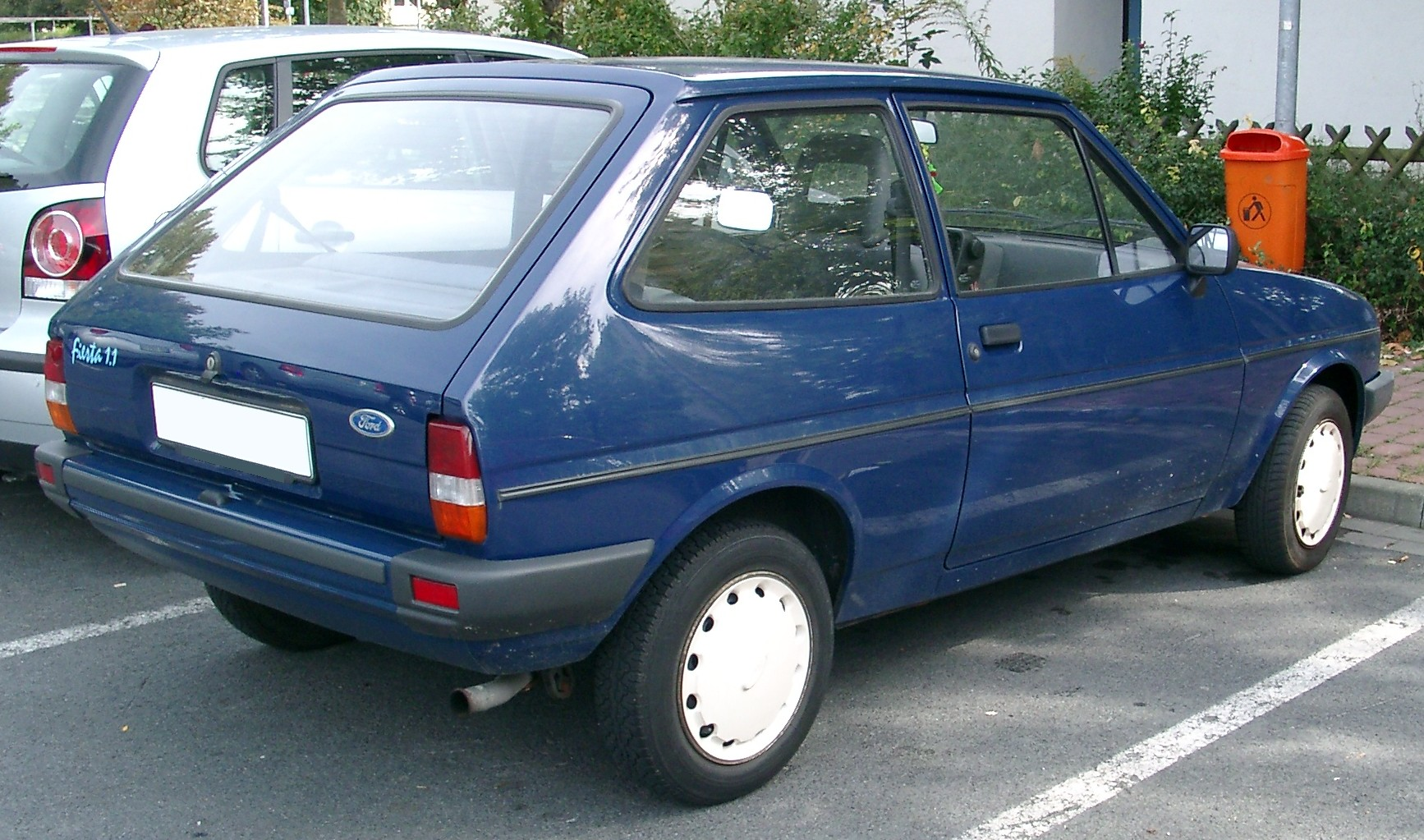
Ford Fiesta Mk2 rear

The Fiesta Mark II appeared in August 1983 with a revised front end and interior, and a bootlid mirroring the swage lines from the sides of the car. The 1.3 L OHV engine was dropped, being replaced in 1984 by a compound valve-angle hemispherical combustion chamber (CVH) powerplant of similar capacity, itself superseded by the lean burn 1.4 L two years later. The 957 and 1,117 cc Kent/Valencia engines continued with only slight alterations and for the first time a Fiesta diesel was produced with a 1,600 cc engine adapted from the Escort.

The new CTX continuously variable transmission, also fitted in the Fiat Uno, eventually appeared early in 1987 on 1.1 L models only.

The Mk2 Fiesta core range (excluding special editions) was made up of these model variants; Popular, Popular Plus, L, Ghia, 1.4S (1986 onwards), and finally, the XR2.

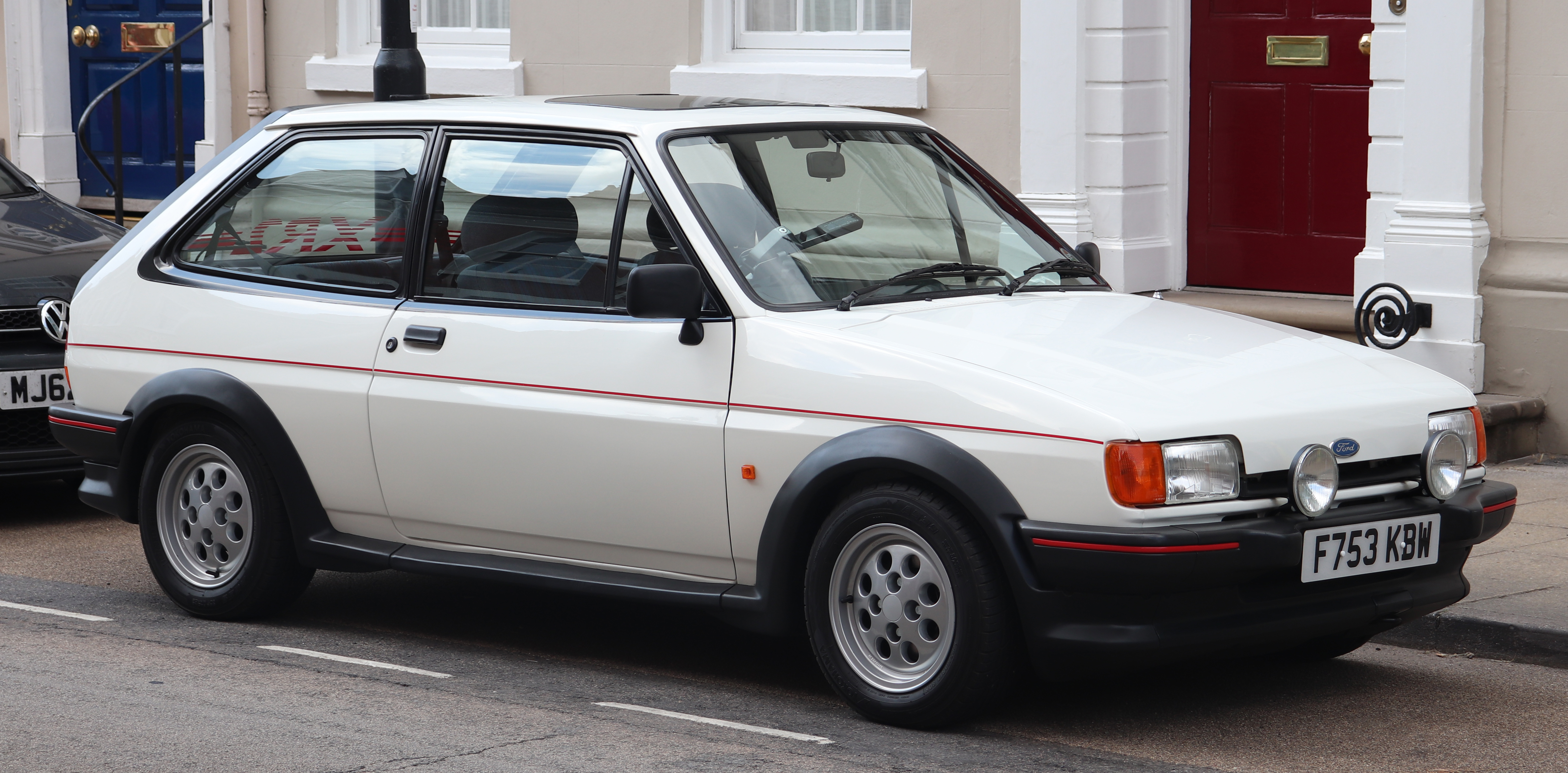

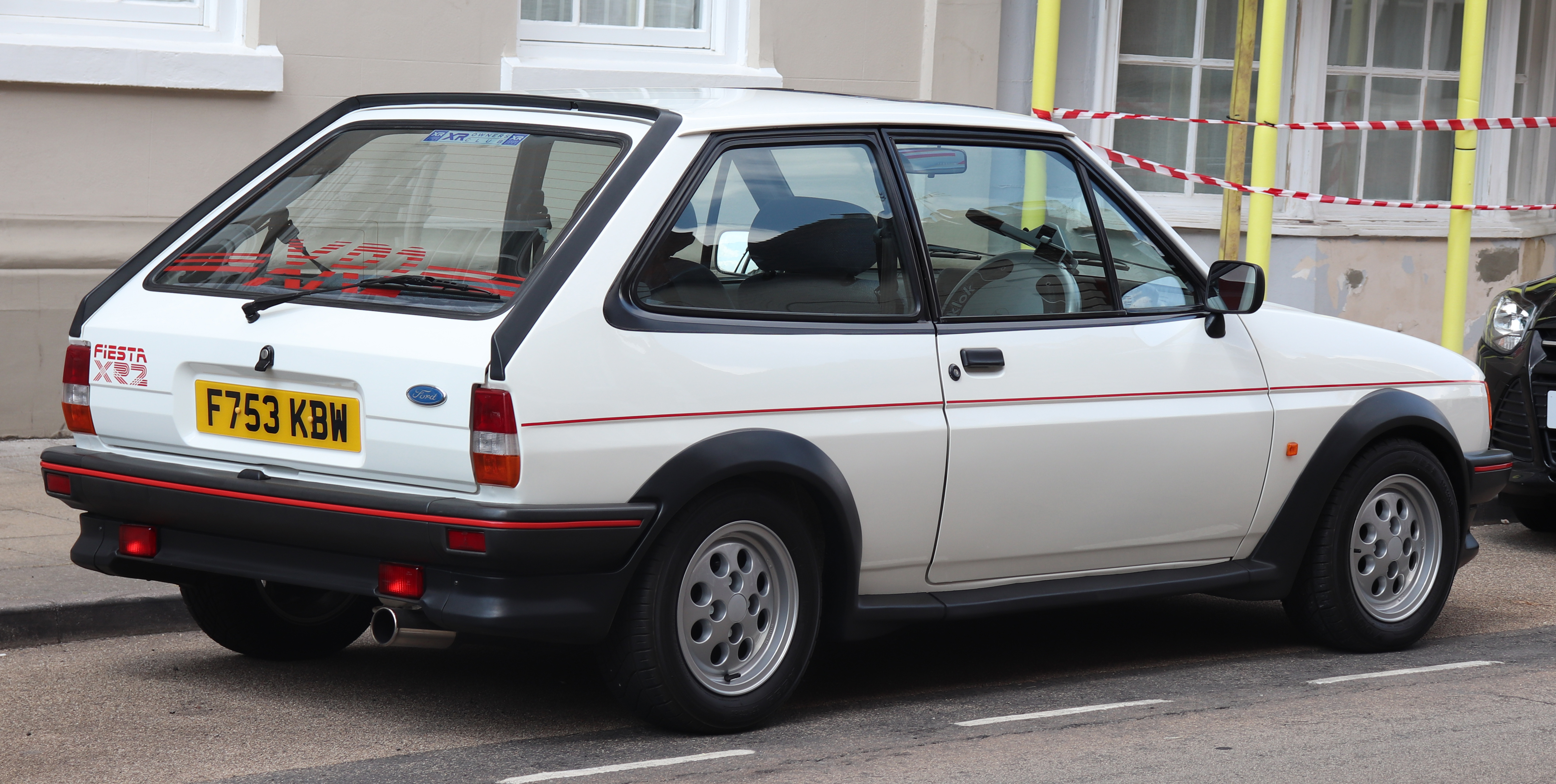
Ford Fiesta XR2

The second-generation Fiesta featured a different dashboard on the lower-series trim levels compared to the more expensive variants.

The XR2 model was thoroughly updated with a larger body kit. It also featured a 96 bhp (72 kW) 1.6 L CVH engine as previously seen in the Ford Escort XR3, and five-speed gearbox (also standard on the 1.3 L CVH models), rather than the four-speed gearbox, which had been used on the previous XR2 and on the rest of the Fiesta range. The engine was replaced by a lean-burn variant in 1986, which featured a revised cylinder head and carburettor; it was significantly cleaner from an environmental viewpoint, but was slightly less powerful as a result (.008 bhp (0.0060 kW)).

A truly "hot" Fiesta was never produced by the factory to avoid impacting sales of performance Ford Escort variants, but many aftermarket conversions were available, such as that by the English firm Turbo Technics boosting power to 125 bhp (93 kW). Ford appreciated the high quality of this conversion, and was keen to look after its customers; the installation was undertaken by approved fitting centres and all the warranties remained valid after.

The facelifted Fiesta, facing competition from the Austin Metro, Fiat Uno, Nissan Micra, Peugeot 205, Toyota Starlet, Vauxhall Nova, and Volkswagen Polo, was one of the UK's top superminis. In its best-ever year, 1987, over 150,000 Fiesta models were sold in the UK, though it finished second in the sales charts to the Ford Escort. It was available in Japan, sold at Ford/Mazda dealerships called Autorama; it complied with Japanese government dimension regulations, and the engine displacement was in the more favourable Japanese road tax bracket, which helped sales.

== Third generation (BE13; 1989) ==
Third generation
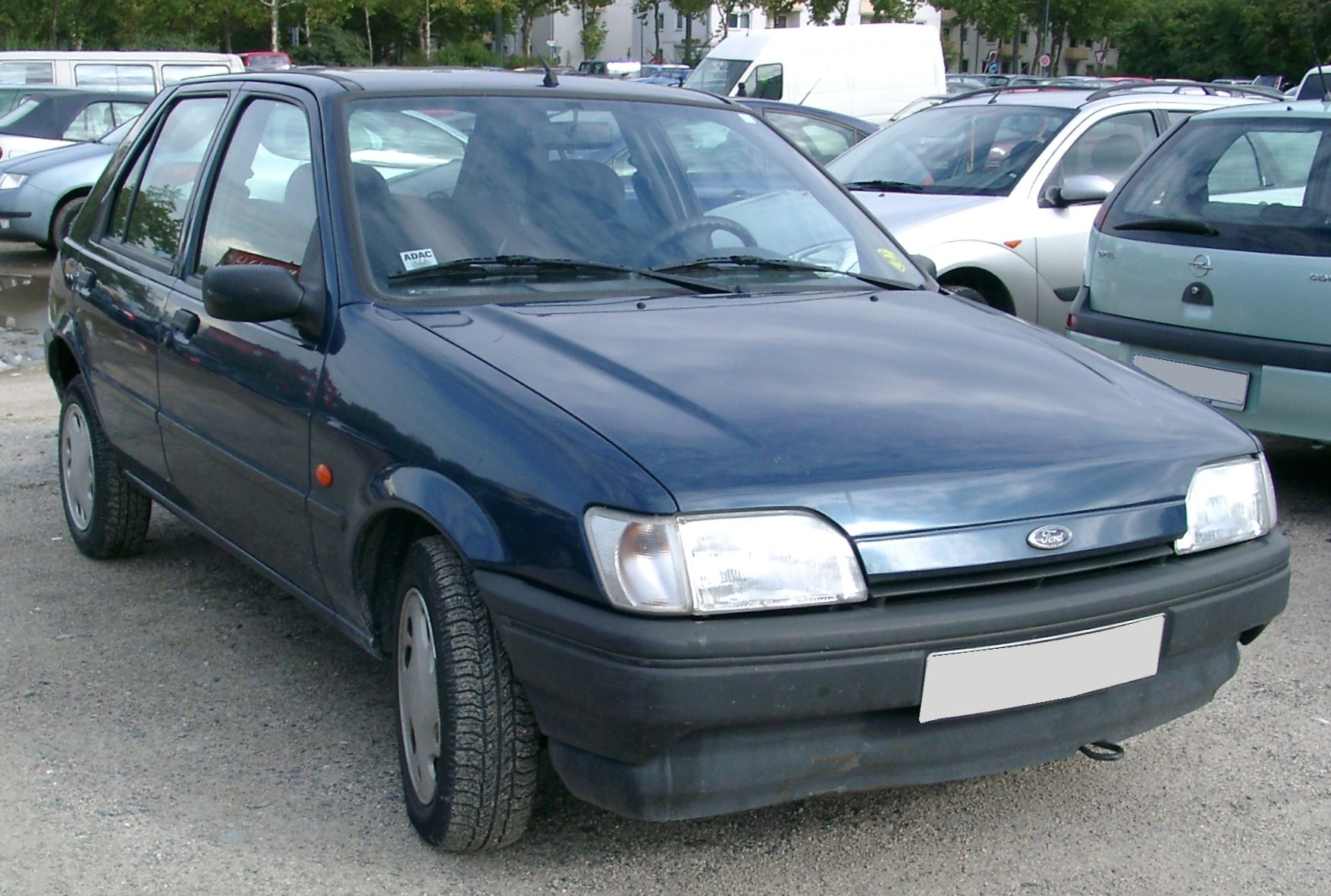

Overview
- Model code: BE13
- Production: 1989–1997

Body and chassis
- Body style: 3/5-door hatchback 3-door panel van 3-door high cube panel van
- Platform: Ford B platform

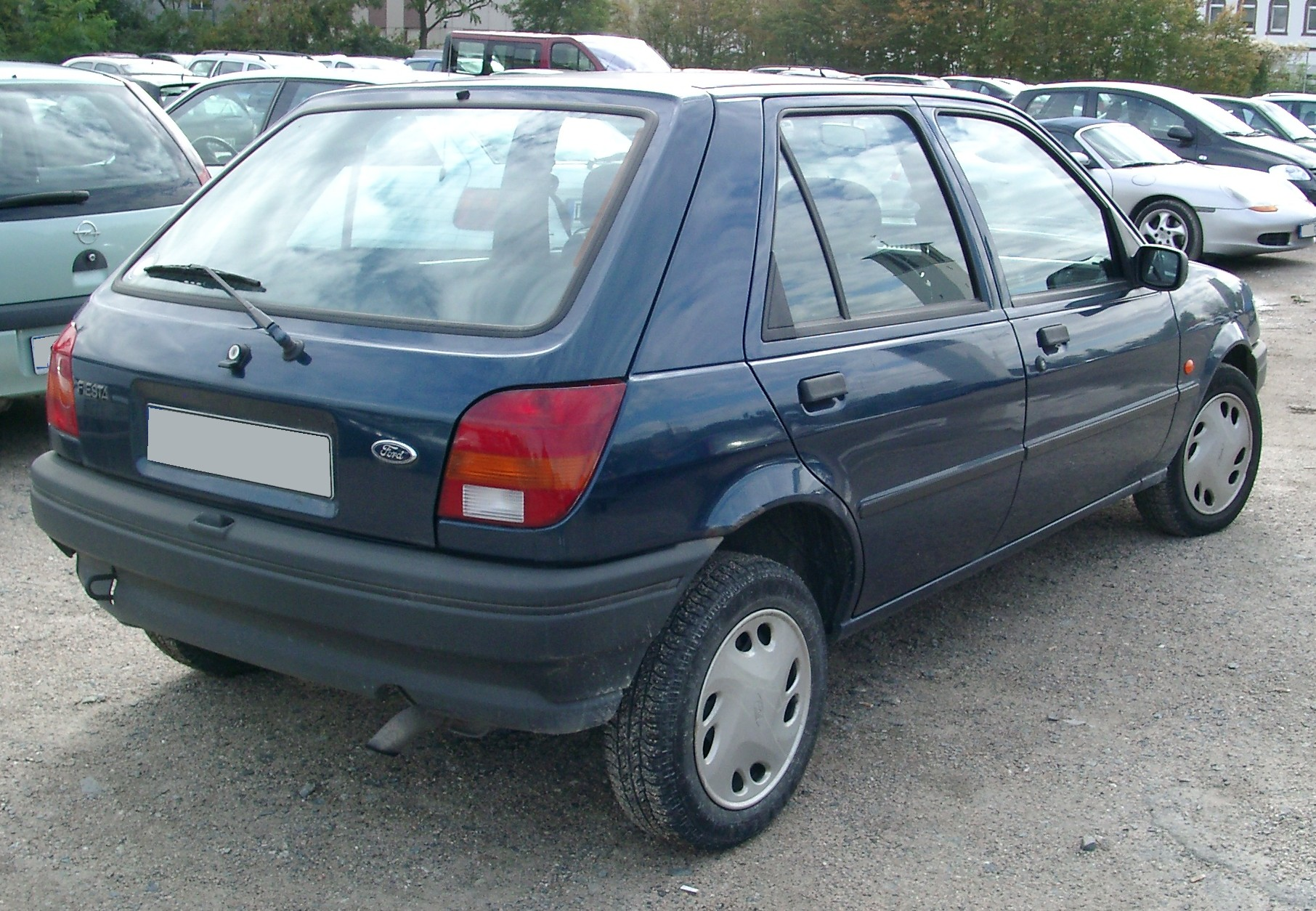
Ford Fiesta MK3 rear

The third-generation Fiesta Mark III, codenamed BE-13, was unveiled at the end of 1988 and officially went on sale in February 1989. The car was based on a new platform, ditching the old car's rear beam axle for a semi-independent torsion beam arrangement, and looked radically different, addressing the principal weakness of the previous generation – the lack of a five-door version, which was by then available in its major rivals such as the Fiat Uno, Peugeot 205 and 106, and Opel Corsa/Vauxhall Nova. The other main change was to the running gear – the improved high-compression swirl version of the Kent/Valencia powerplant. The CVH units from the second generation were carried over largely unmodified. The diesel engine was enlarged to a 1.8 L capacity.

The first sports model was the 1.6S CVH 90BHP which had a twin choke Weber carburettor with no CAT and was still on sale until August 1991. It was replaced by the fuel injection XR2i.

The sports-model XR2i was launched in August 1989 with an eight-valve CVH engine with 104 PS (76 kW). This was the first Fiesta to have a fuel-injected engine. This was then replaced by a Zetec 16-valve version in 1992, which also had the RS Turbo being supplanted by the RS1800, as the CVH engine was being phased out. The RS1800 shared its 1.8-litre Zetec fuel-injected engine with the 130 PS (96 kW; 130 bhp) version of the then-current Ford Escort XR3i, and had a top speed of 125 mph (201 km/h). The XR2i name was also dropped in early 1994, and the insurance-friendly "Si" badge appeared in its place on a slightly less sporty-looking model with either the 1.4 L PTE (a development of the CVH) or the 1.6 L Zetec engine.

With the introduction of the successor Mark IV, the Mark III was built and sold at the same time. To distinguish the car, trim levels were revised, and it was marketed as the "Fiesta Classic". This version continued for a year and a half, with production ceasing in February 1997.

== Fourth generation (BE91; 1995) ==
Fourth generation
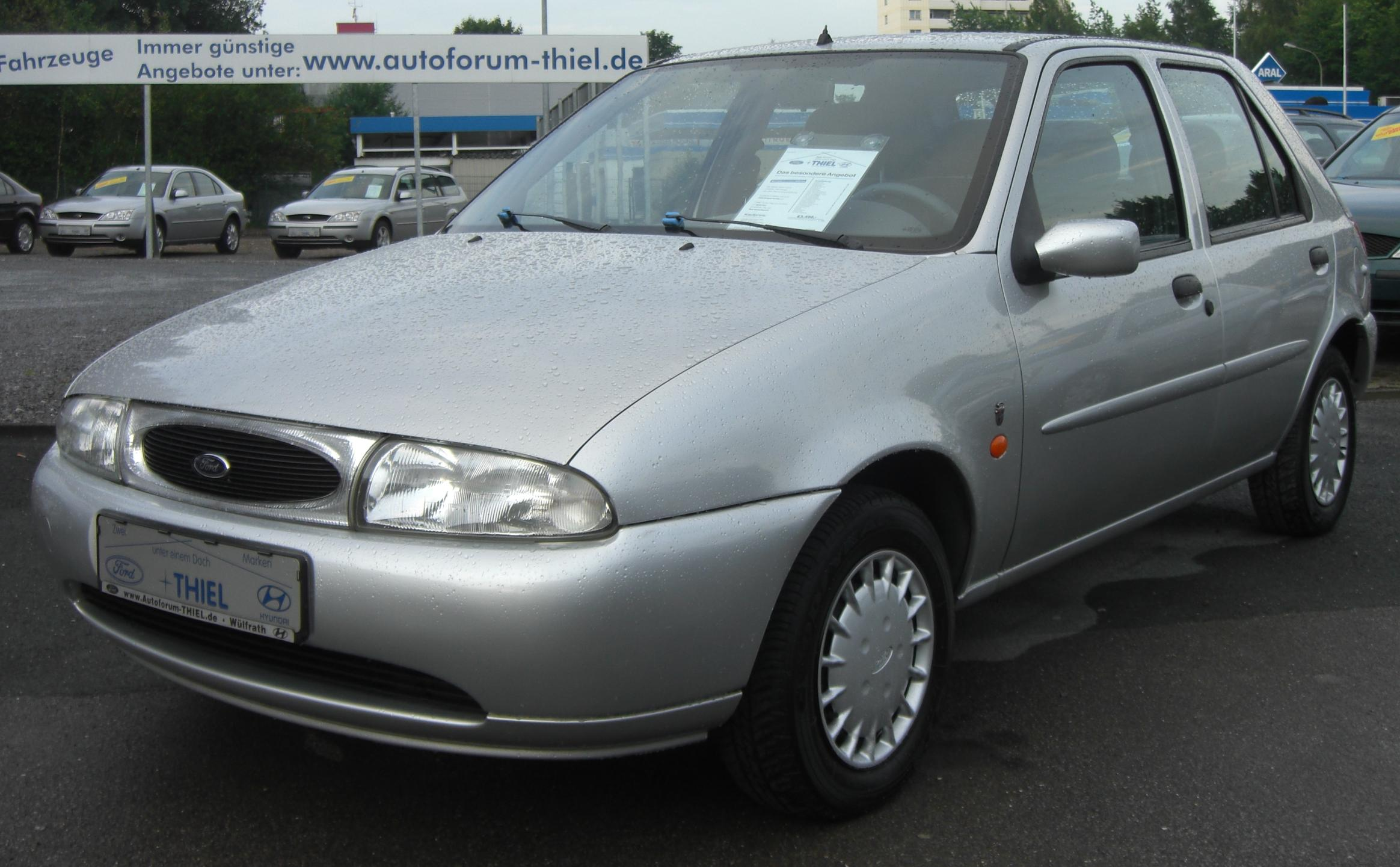

Overview
- Model code: BE91
- Production: October 1995 – December 2002 (Europe); 1996–2006 (Brazil)

Body and chassis
- Body style: 3/5-door hatchback 3-door panel van 4-door sedan 3-door high cube panel van (Courier); 2 door coupé utility (Courier)
- Platform: Ford B platform

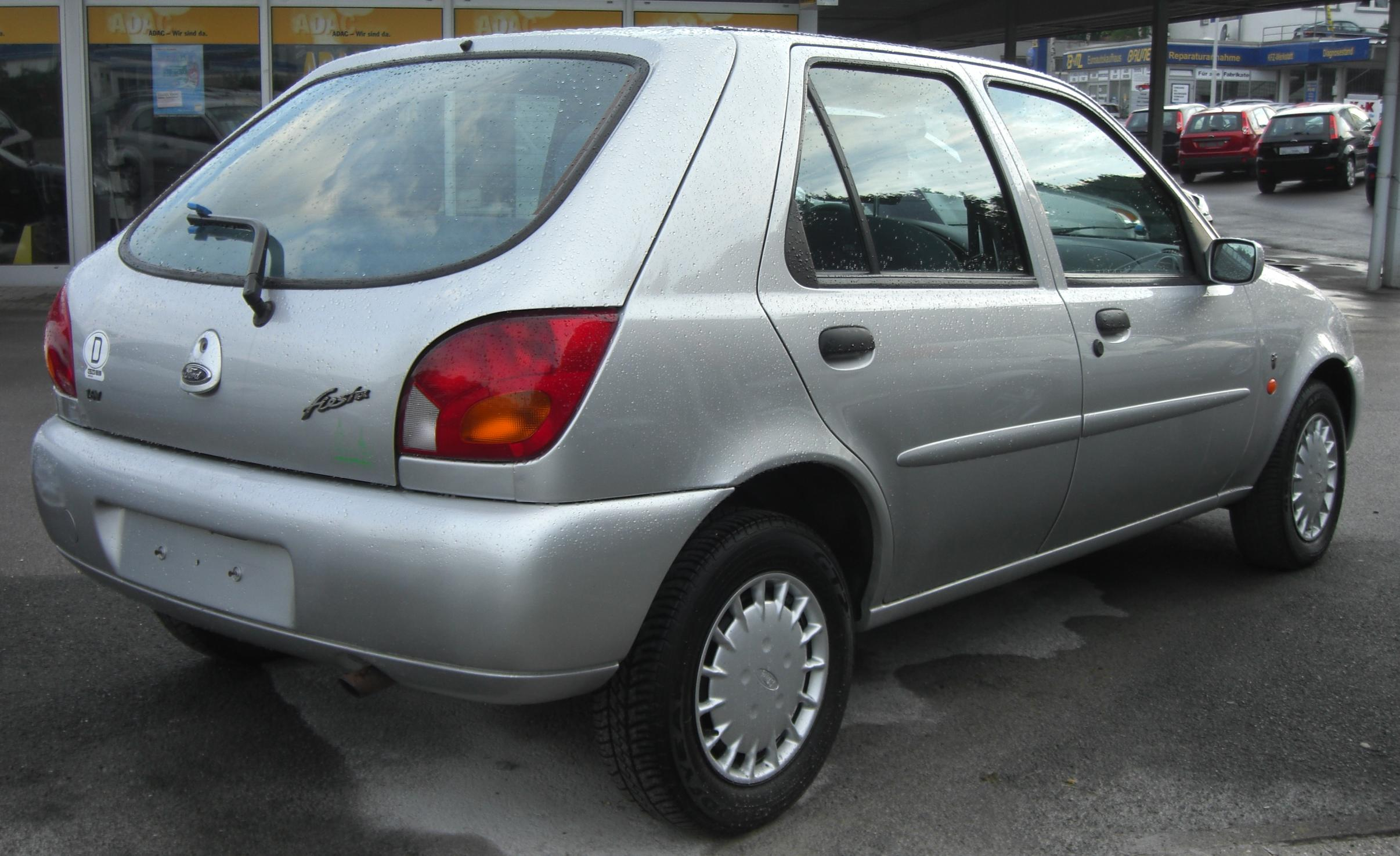
Hatchback (pre-facelift)

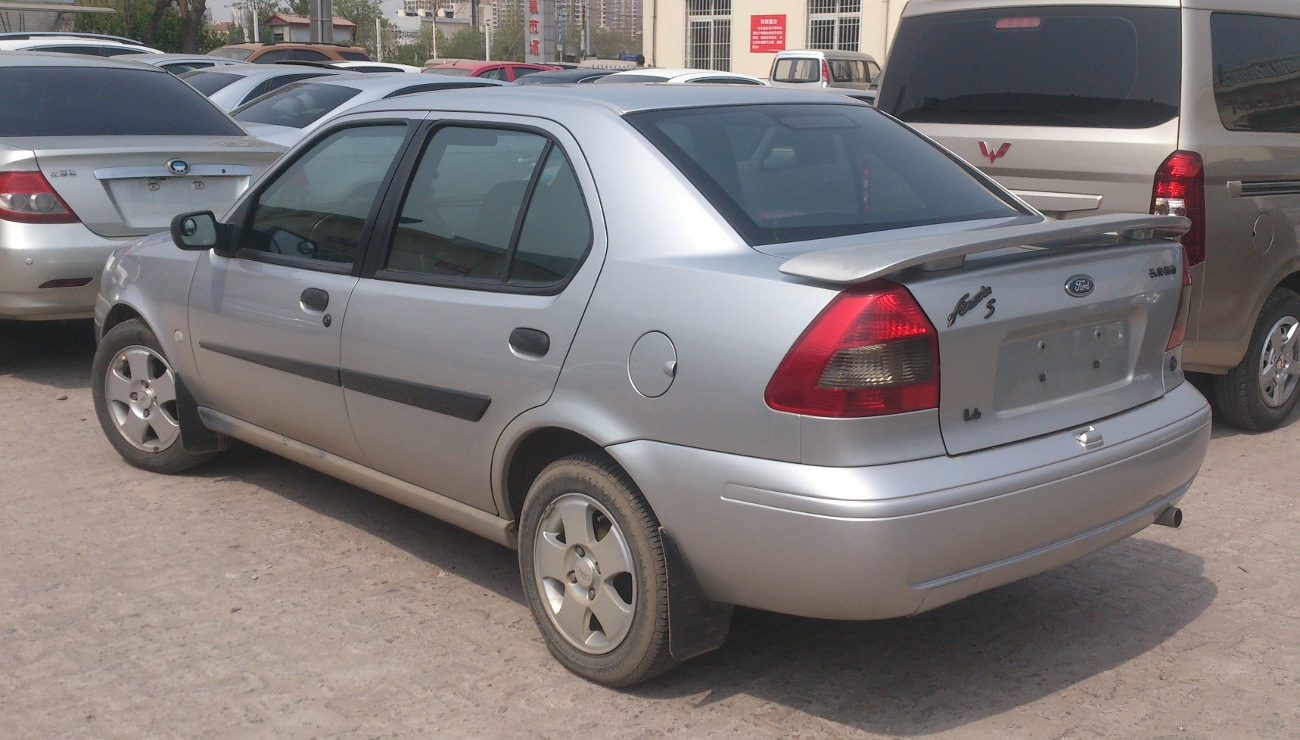
Sedan

The Fiesta Mark IV (internal code name was BE91) was launched in October 1995 and became Britain's best-selling car from 1996 to 1998, when it was overtaken by the all-new Ford Focus, a replacement for the Escort.

The Mark IV benefited from new interior and exterior styling. It maintained similar dimensions to the Mark III, along with the platform and the basic body structure, most noticeably the side door openings. The RS1800 and RS Turbo models were not carried over to the updated Fiesta range.

The model featured a range of new Zetec-SE engines, available in 1.25 L and 1.4 L forms, the 1.8-litre Diesel engine was slightly modified for the Mark IV, now marketed as the "Endura DE". Lower-specification models remained available with what was the final edition of the Kent 1.3 L OHV engine, now known as Endura-E.

As an exercise in badge engineering, the Mazda 121 and Ford Fiesta Mark IV shared their design, were built on the same production lines, and used almost all the same parts. In the JD Power reliability surveys at the time, the Mazda was reported to be significantly more reliable and attracted higher levels of customer satisfaction, despite it being a slower seller than the Fiesta.

== Fifth generation (BE256; 2002) ==
Fifth generation
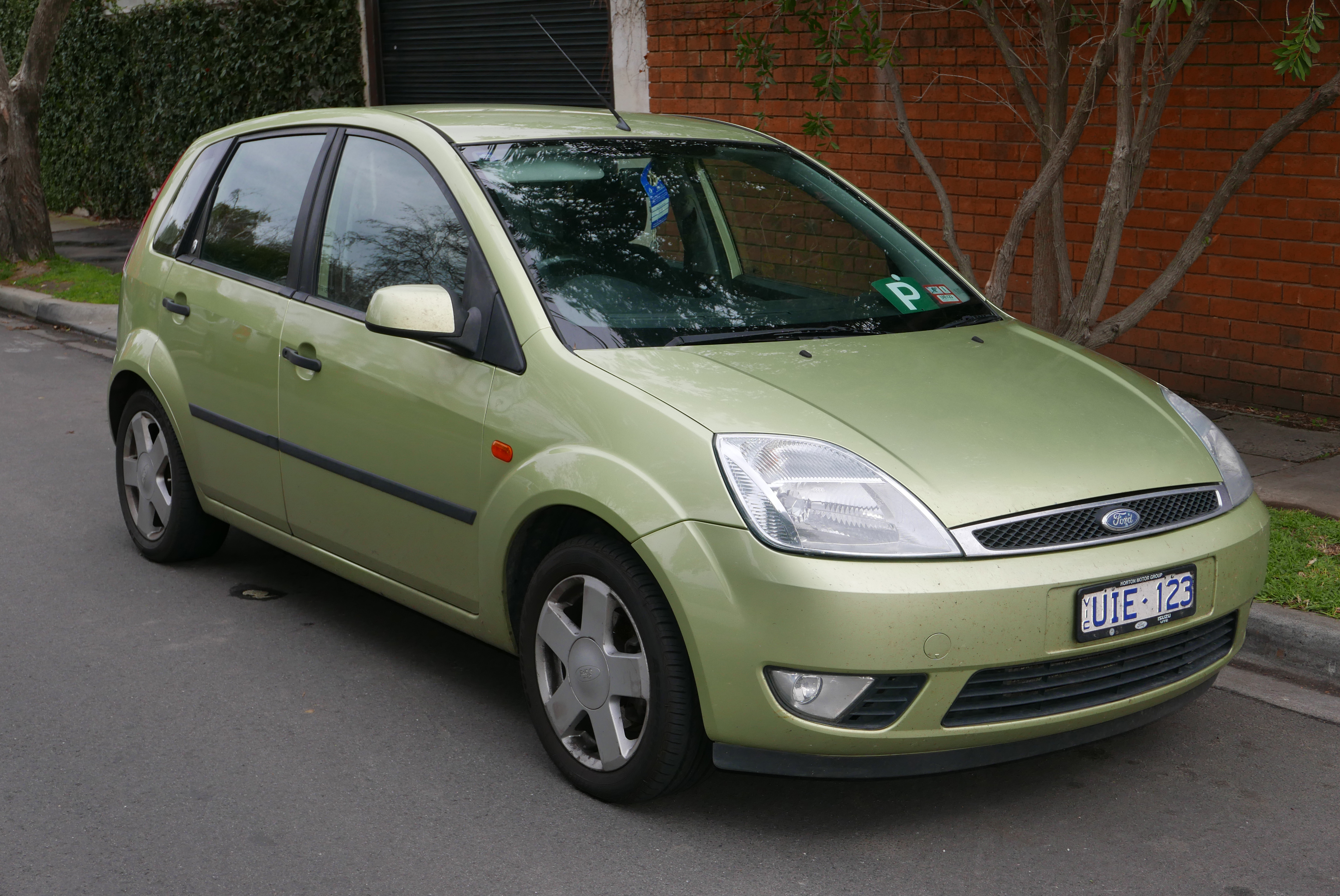

Overview
- Model code: BE256
- Production: 2002–2008; 2002–2010 (Mexico); 2002–2014 (Brazil)

Body and chassis
- Body style: 3/5-door hatchback 4-door saloon (Ikon); 3-door panel van
- Platform: Ford B3 platform

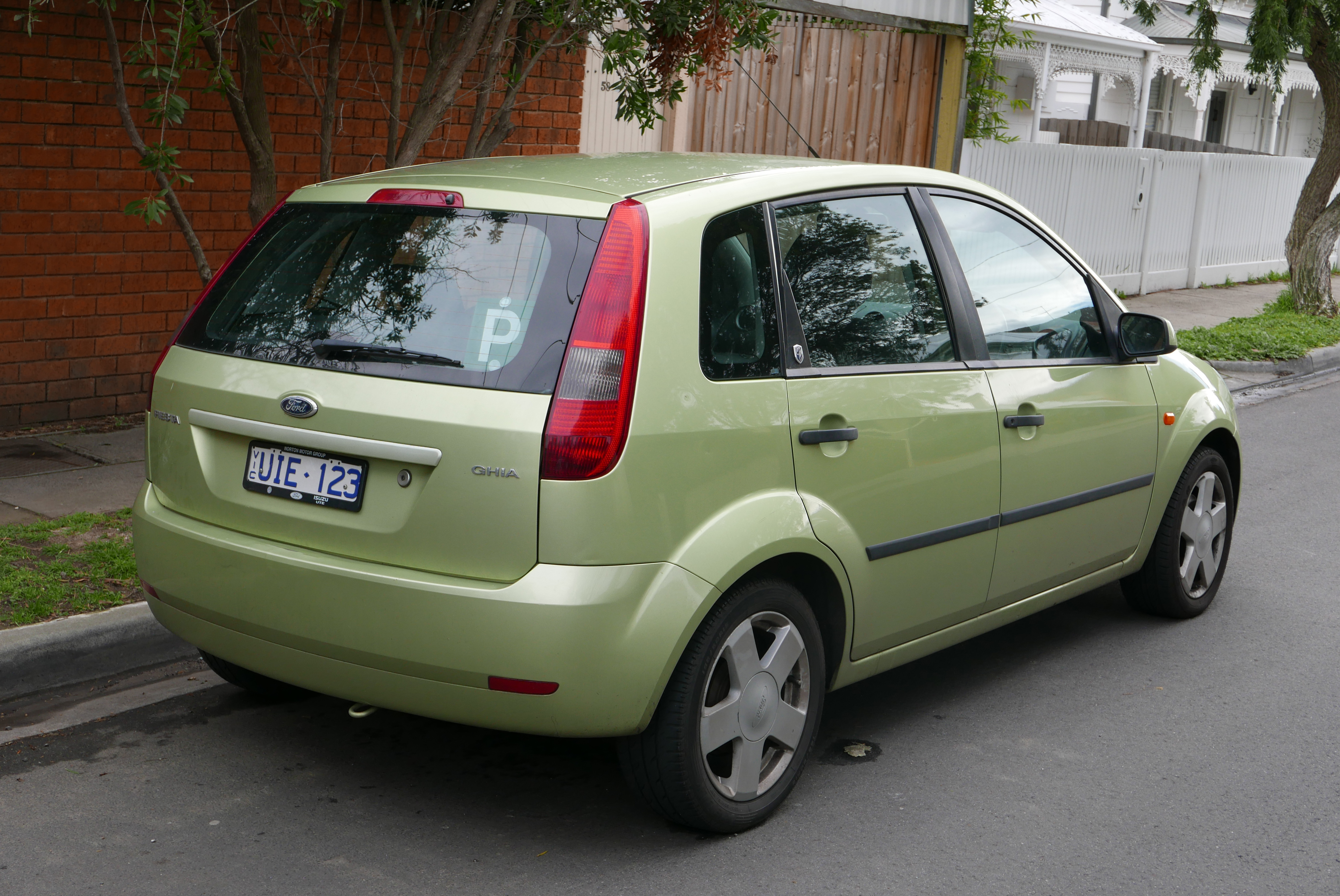
Rear view

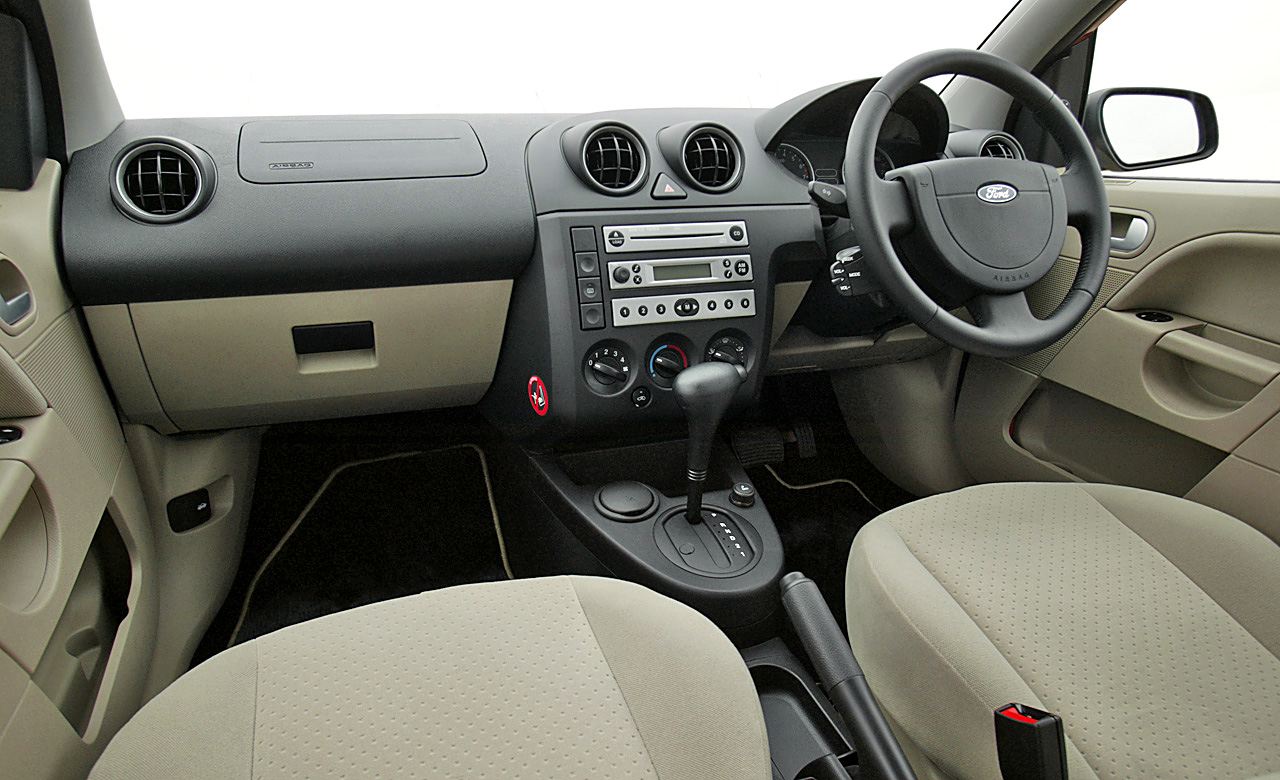
Interior

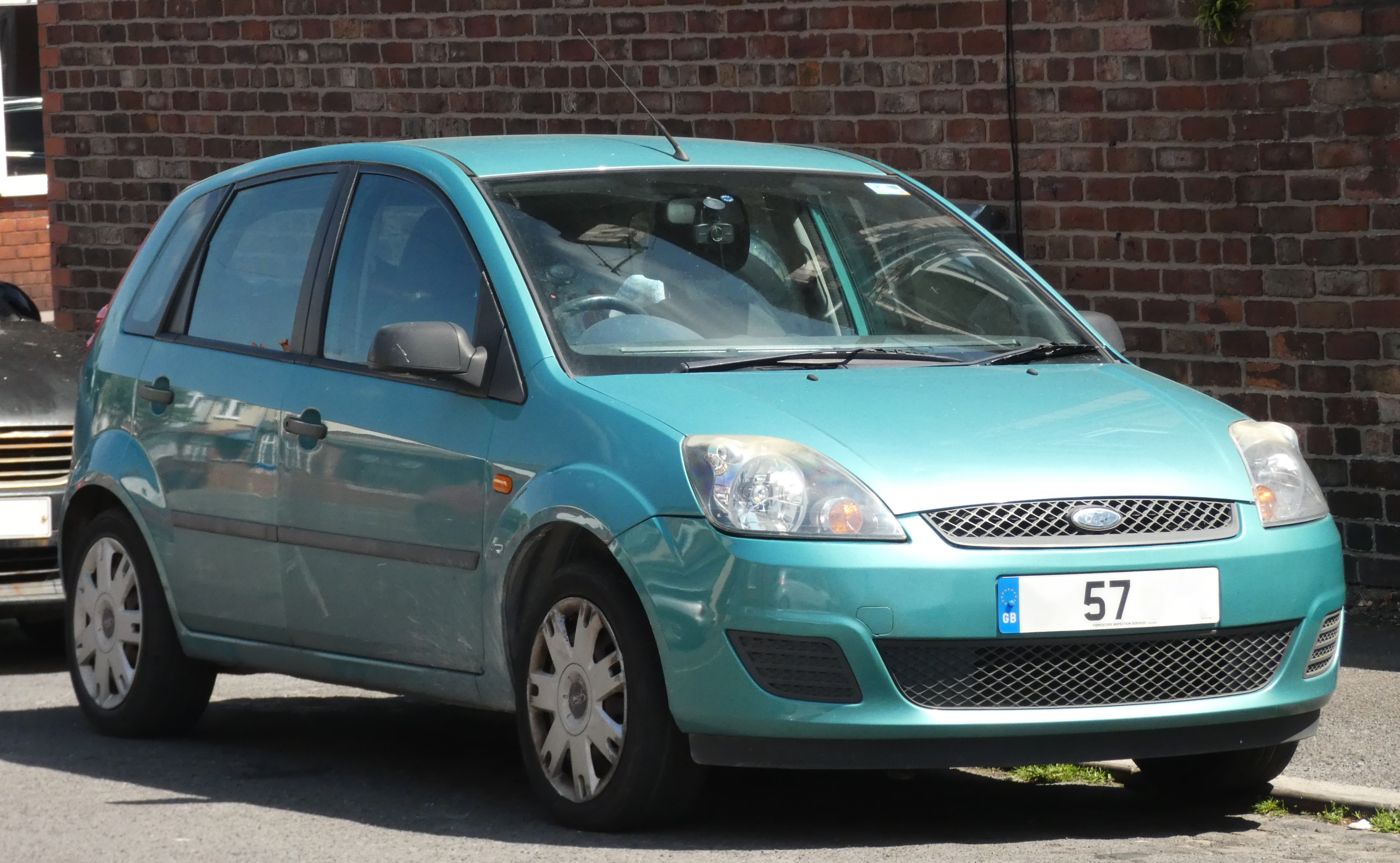
Front view (facelift)

On 1 April 2002, the Fiesta Mark V was unveiled. This generation of the Ford Fiesta (Mk5) is often referred to as Mk6. This is because the previous model, the Mk4 Fiesta, was often called the Mk5 after it received a facelift in late 1999. In other words, the 2002–2008 Fiesta is the fifth generation model and what is often referred to as Mk5 is just a facelift model of the Mk4 – different looking front but still the same car. Production at Almussafes Plant started on 29 April 2002. Most engines were carried over from the previous Fiesta, but renamed "Duratec", as the "Zetec" name was now solely used for sportier models. The previous push-rod 1.3 L engine was initially available in the UK, but this was quickly replaced with a Rocam 1.3 L, both under the name Duratec 8v.

Trim levels available initially were Finesse, LX, Zetec, and Ghia, with limited-edition variants soon following. The fifth generation was also the first Fiesta to feature the anti-lock braking system and passenger airbags as standard. This generation became the best-selling Ford Fiesta generation to date.

Engines available include 1.25, 1.3, 1.4, 1.6, and 2.0 L petrol engines, plus 1.4 L 8v and 1.6 L 16v Duratorq TDCi common-rail diesels built in a joint venture with PSA. There was also a Supercharged 1.0 L in the Brazilian market.

This was the first Fiesta to be sold in Asia and Australasia (all 1.6 L LX three-door/five-door, Zetec three-door, Ghia five-door), replacing the Kia-based Festiva. In Brazil and Argentina, a Fiesta saloon version was introduced in late 2004. A similar Fiesta saloon model, with a different front end, was released in India in late 2005. This Fiesta generation was ergonomically and mechanically more advanced than any previous generation. The 2005 facelift came with an improved exterior.

== Sixth generation (B299/B409; 2008) ==
Sixth generation
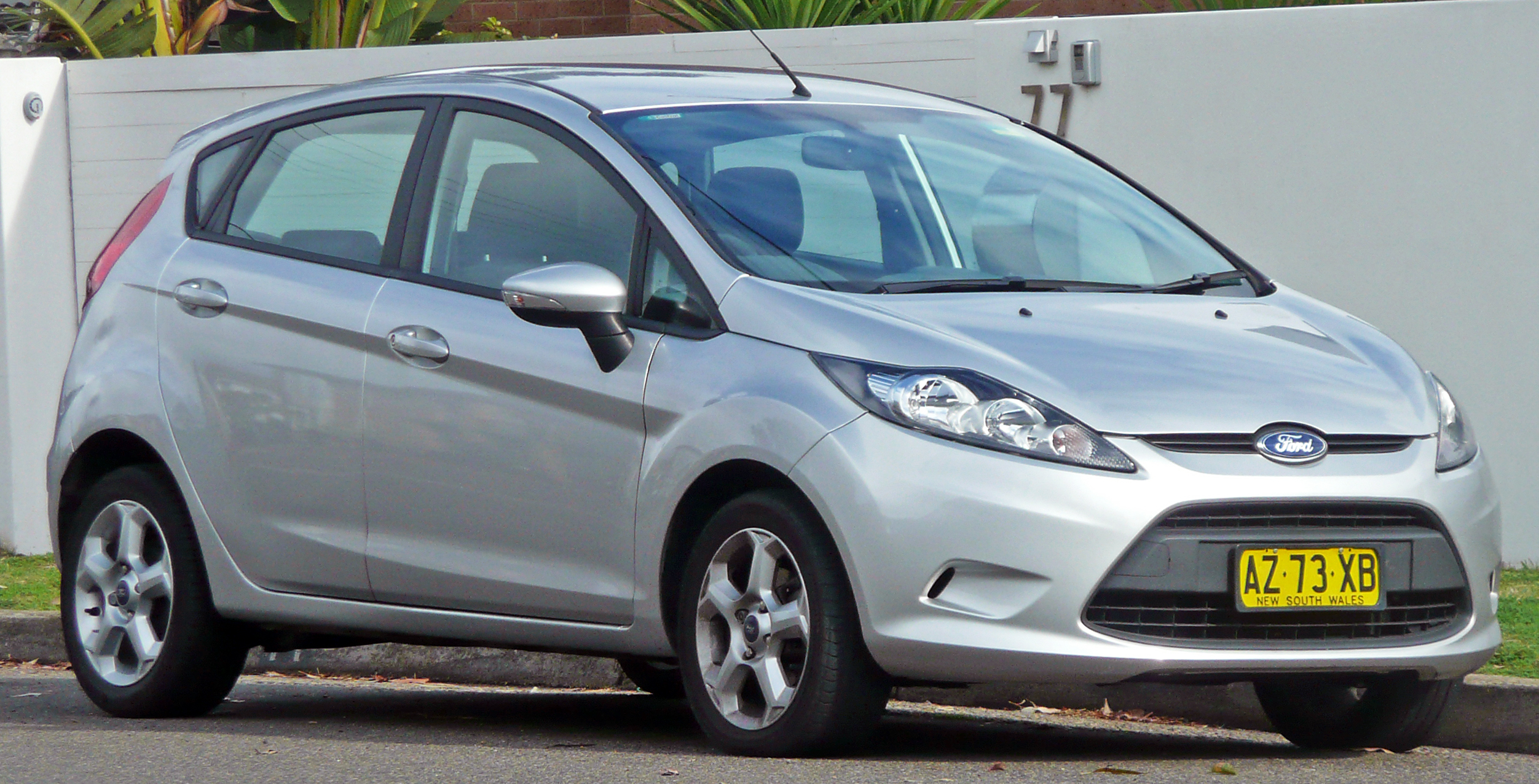

Overview
- Model code: B299 (hatchback); B409 (sedan)
- Production: 2008–2019
- Model years: 2011–2019 (North America)

Body and chassis
- Body style: 3/5-door hatchback 4-door saloon 3-door van
- Platform: Ford global B-car platform

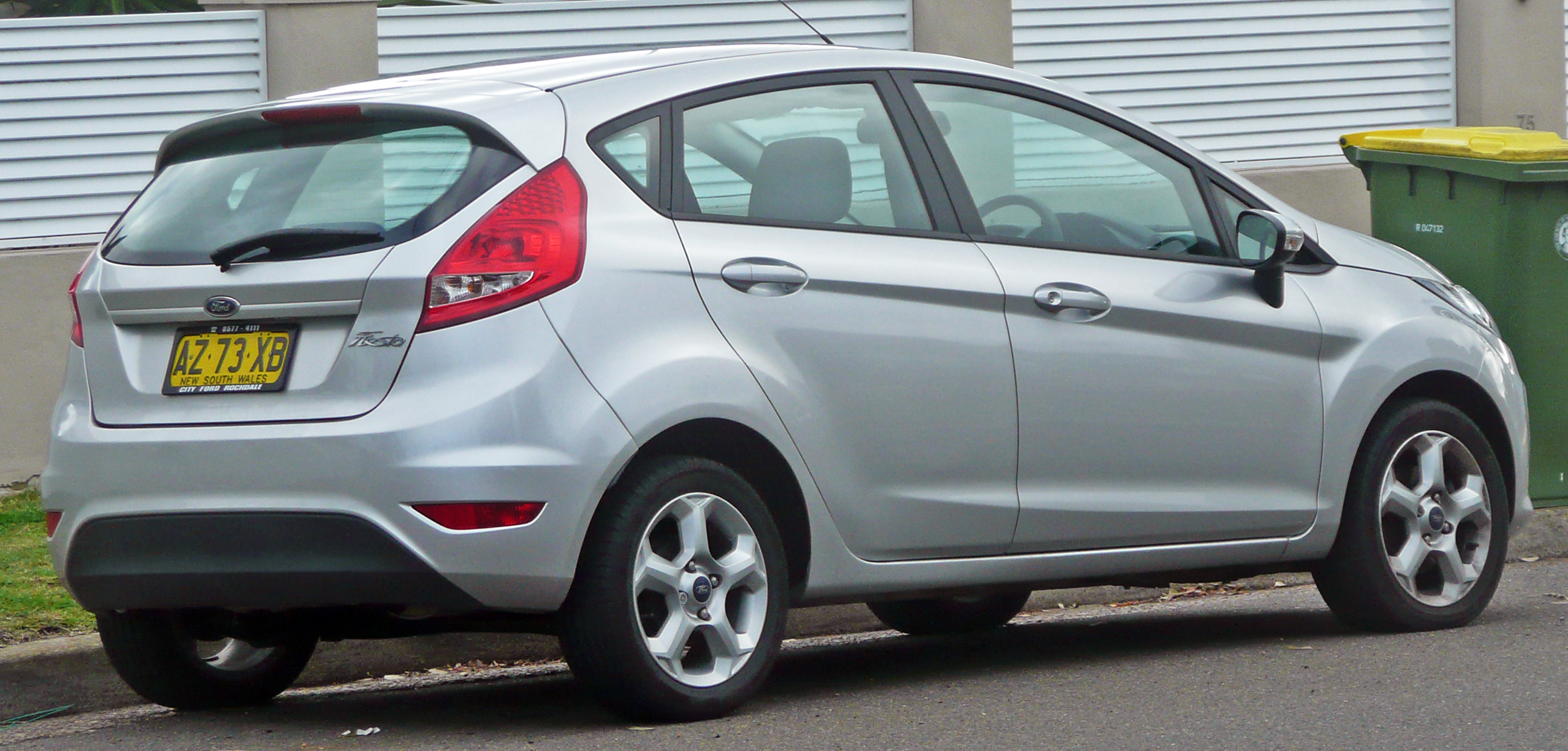
Rear view

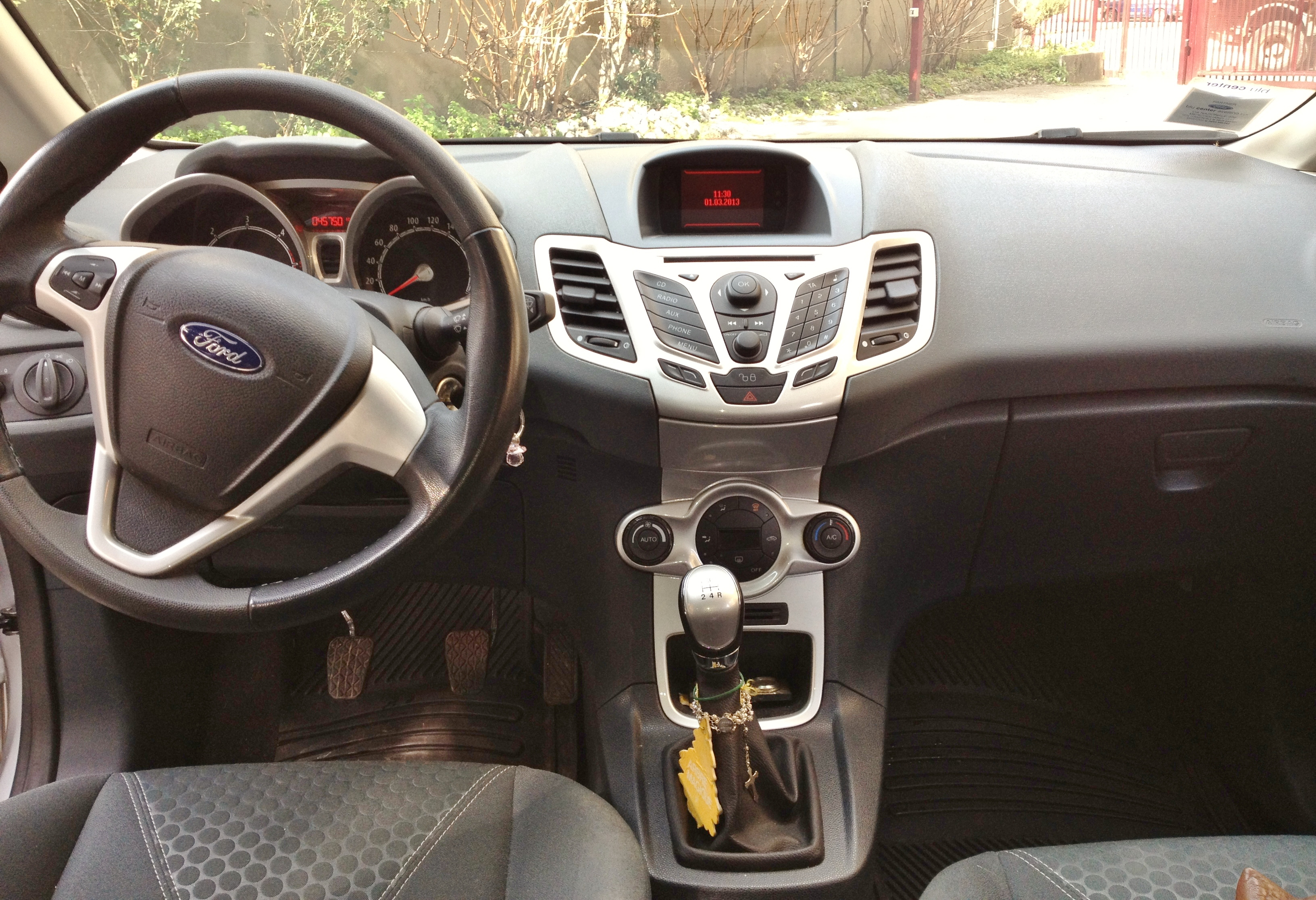
Interior

The sixth-generation Fiesta, also known as Mark VI or Mark VII in the UK, was shown in concept form as the Ford Verve at the Frankfurt Motor Show in September 2007, and marketed in principal European markets, Australia and the United States. Developed under the project code B299 and B409, this model uses the new Ford global B-car platform.

The model was launched under the company's new "One Ford" strategy, which called for single models to be manufactured and sold globally to achieve efficiency and economies of scale, instead of making regional models. Production started at Ford's Cologne plant in Germany in August 2008. A second plant in Valencia, Spain, started production in early 2009. Production in China, Thailand, and Mexico started from late 2008 to 2010. In Brazil, the production of the hatchback version started in 2013. The production of the Ford Fiesta was discontinued in Brazil in June 2019, after being present in the market for 24 years.

In late September 2012 at the Paris Motor Show, the facelifted Fiesta for the European market went on sale in 2013. It was the first to use Ford's latest corporate front end, which included the newly introduced trapezoidal grille.

== Seventh generation (B479; 2017) ==
Seventh generation
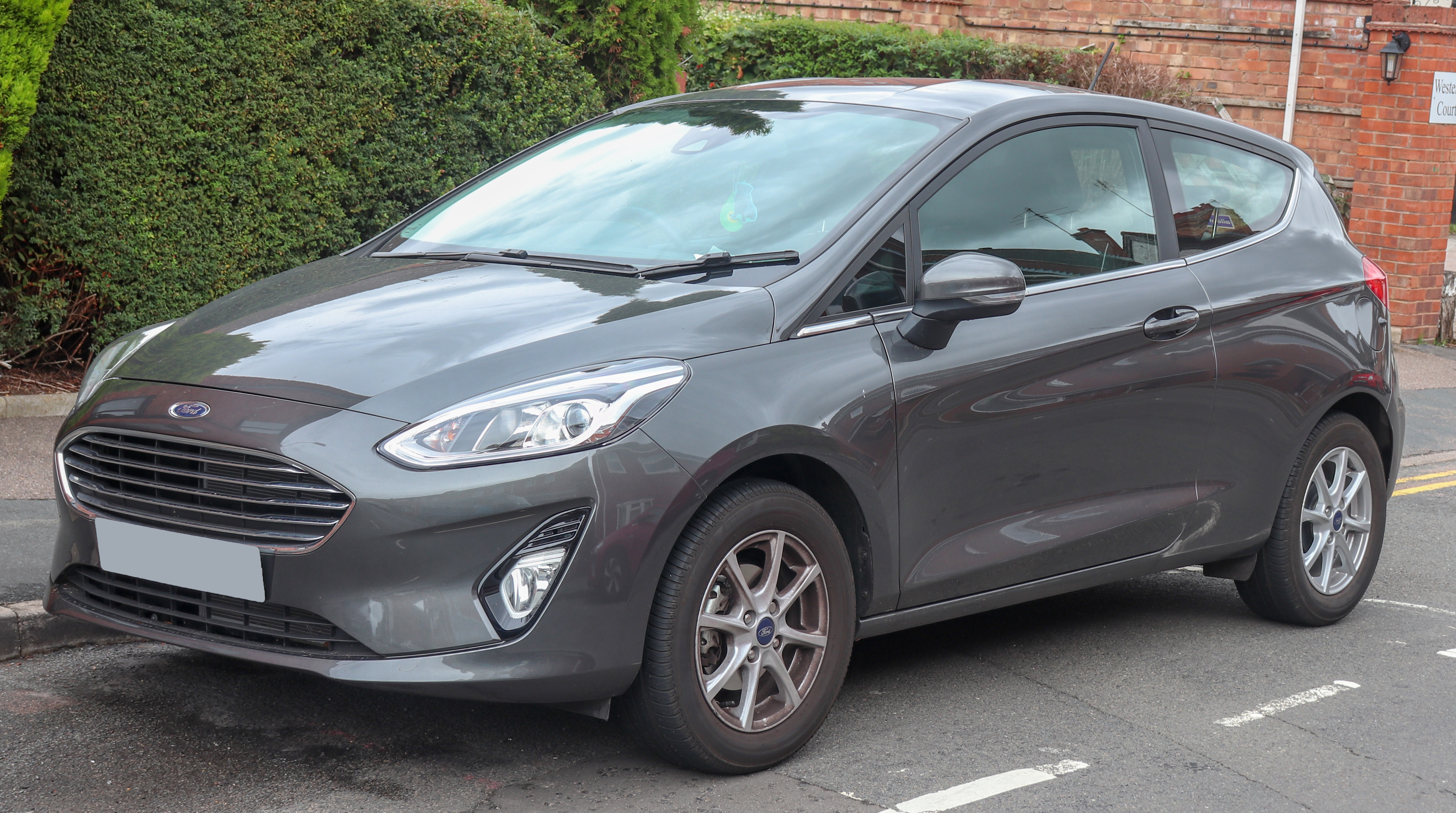

Overview
- Model code: B479
- Production: 2017–2023
- Assembly: Cologne, Germany

Body and chassis
- Body style: 3/5-door hatchback
- Platform: Ford global B-car platform

Dimensions
- Length: 4,069 mm (160.2 in) 4,048 mm (159.4 in) (Titanium) 4,091 mm (161.1 in) (ST)
- Width: 1,735 mm (68.3 in); 1,941 mm (76.4 in) (with mirrors)
- Height: 1,484 mm (58.4 in); 1,487 mm (58.5 in) (ST)
- Kerb weight: 1,187–1,267 kg (2,617–2,793 lb)

On 29 November 2016, the seventh-generation Fiesta (Mark VII, or Mark VIII in UK) was announced in Germany. It was said to be larger, roomier, safer, more efficient, and more upmarket compared to its predecessor. The Fiesta range expanded to include new additions – a crossover-styled variant called the Fiesta Active, and the luxury Fiesta Vignale.

The model was not sold in the Americas, Asia or Oceania, as Ford decided to prioritise crossover SUVs, pickup trucks and sports cars. However, the Fiesta ST continued to be sold in Australia due to its popularity and larger profit margin.

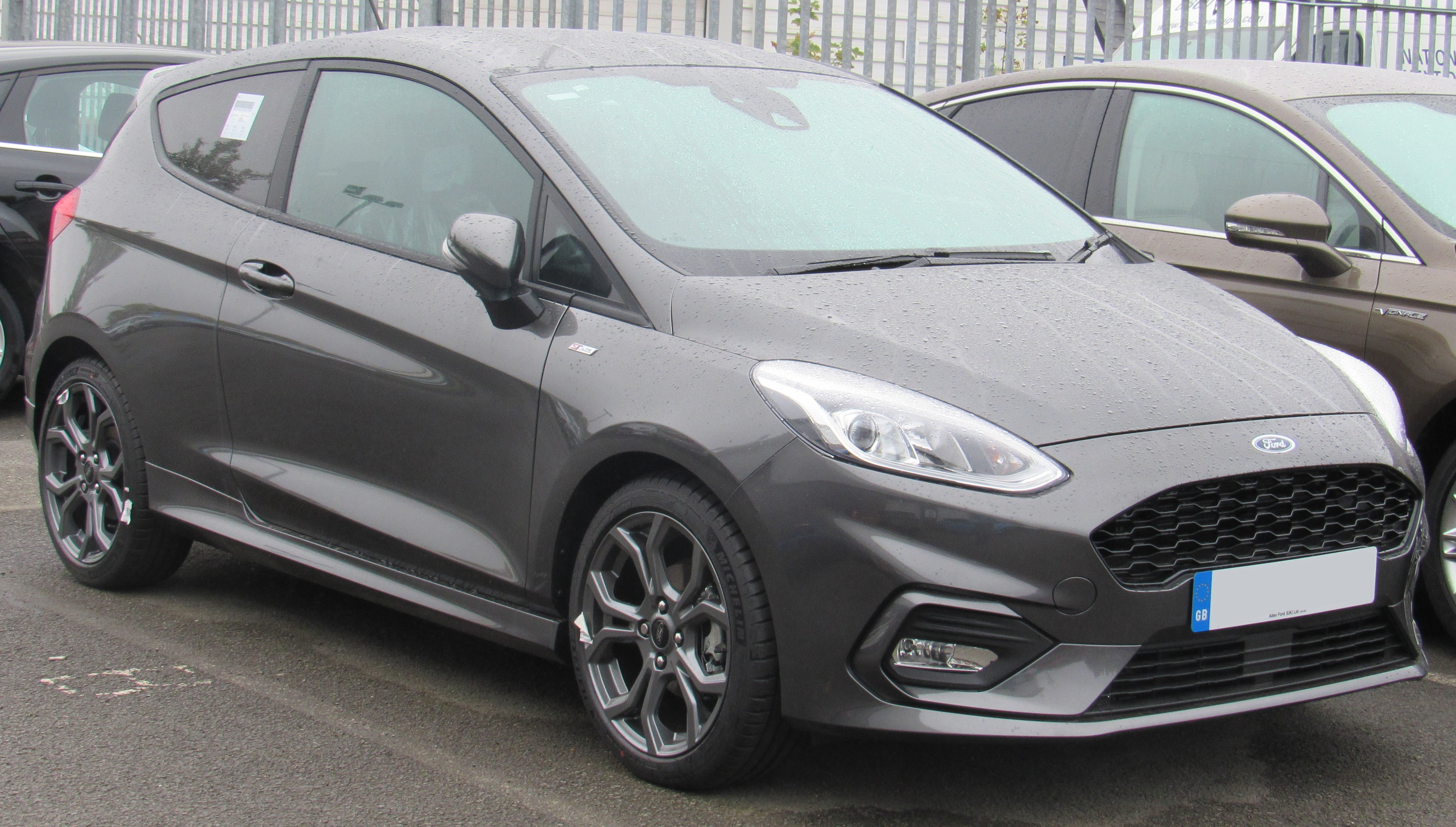
Front view (ST-Line)

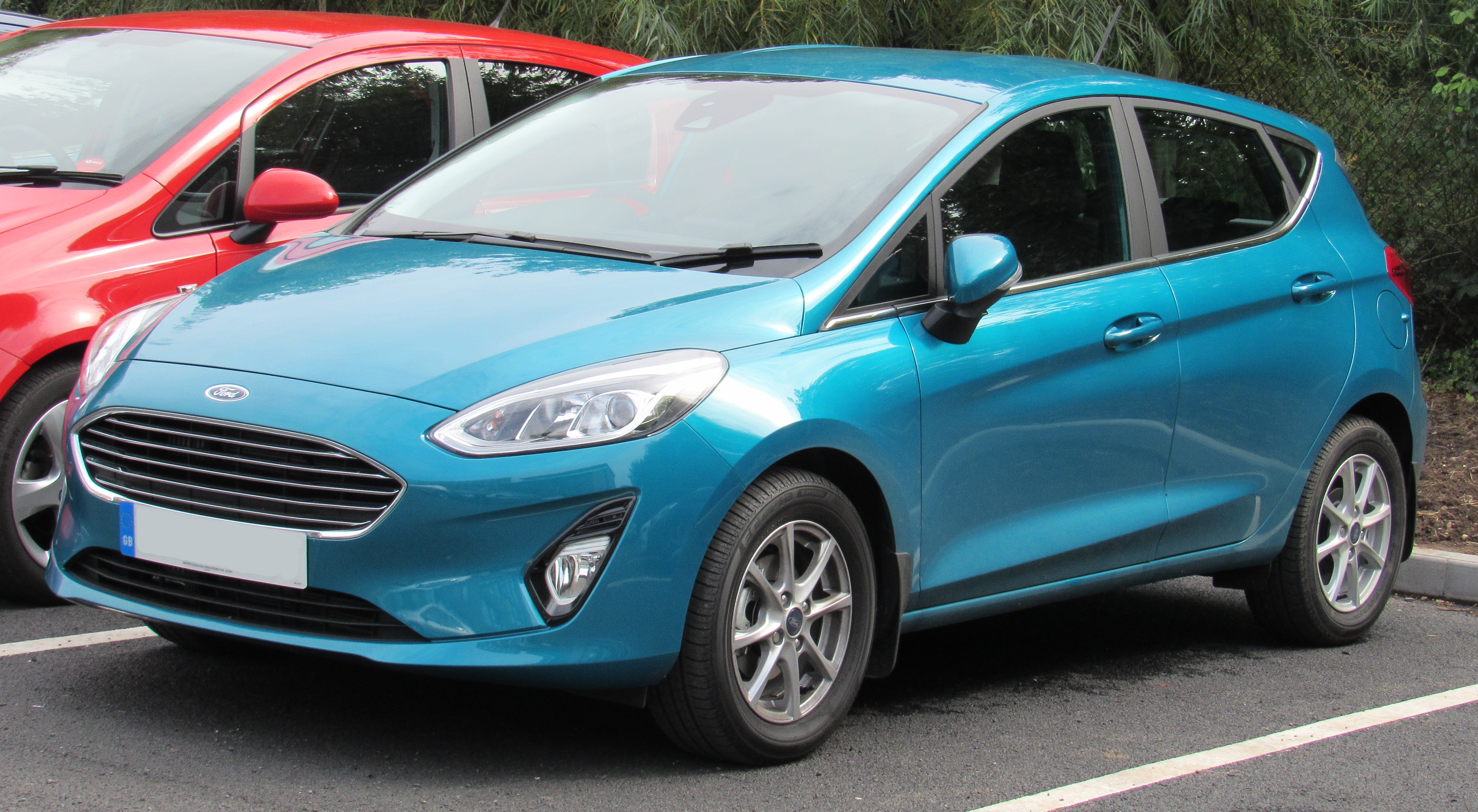
Front view

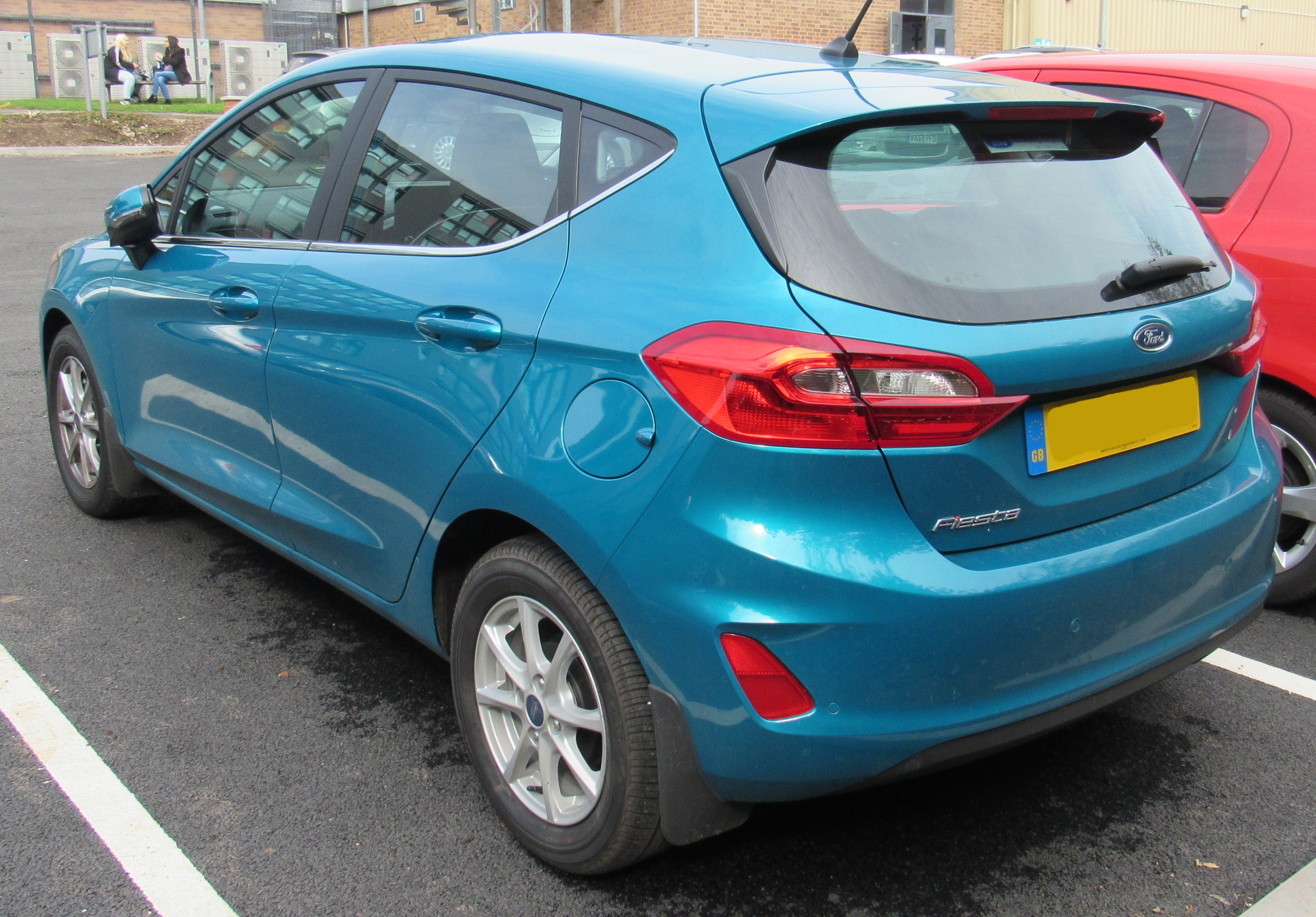
Rear view

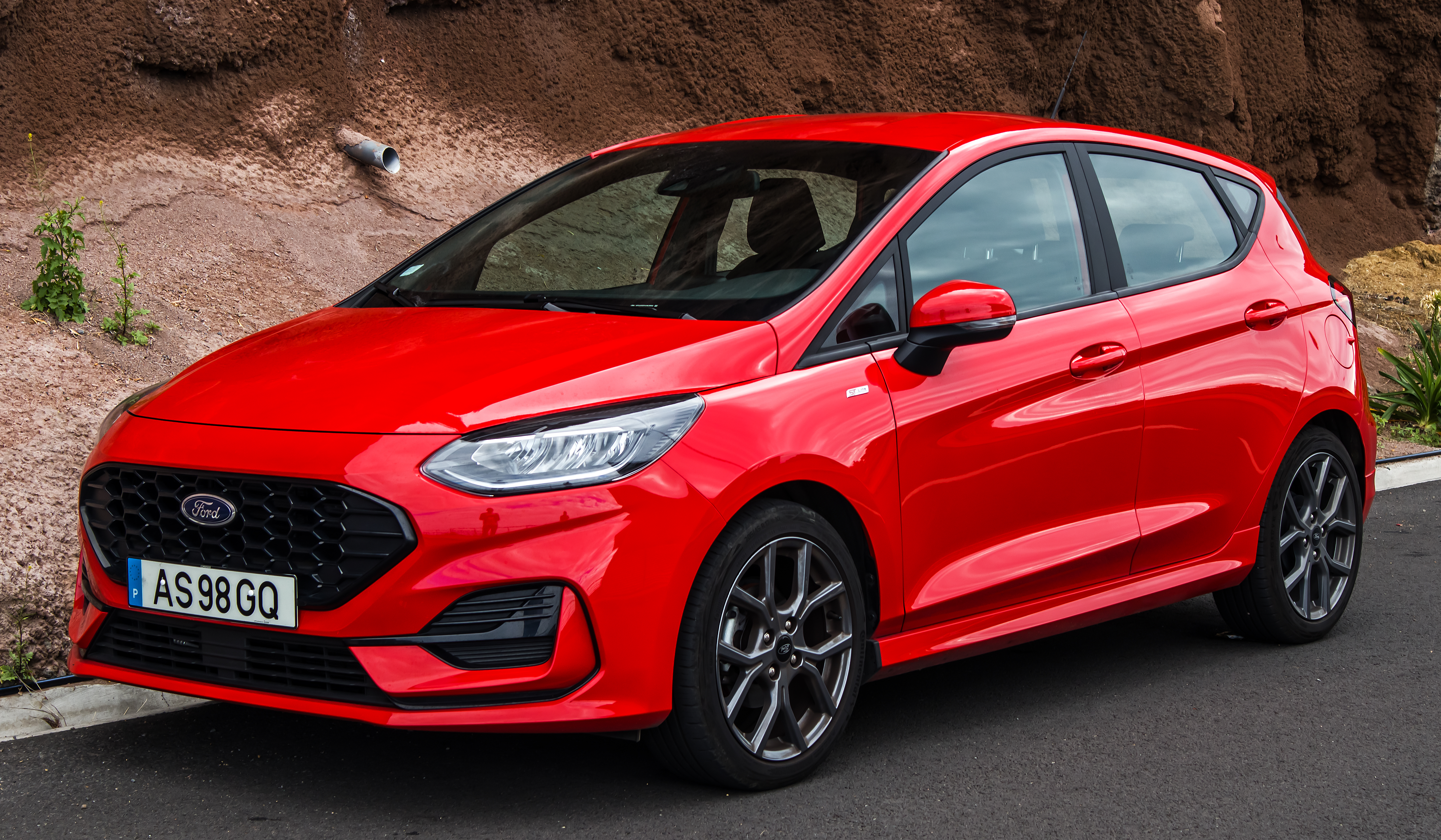
Front view (facelift)

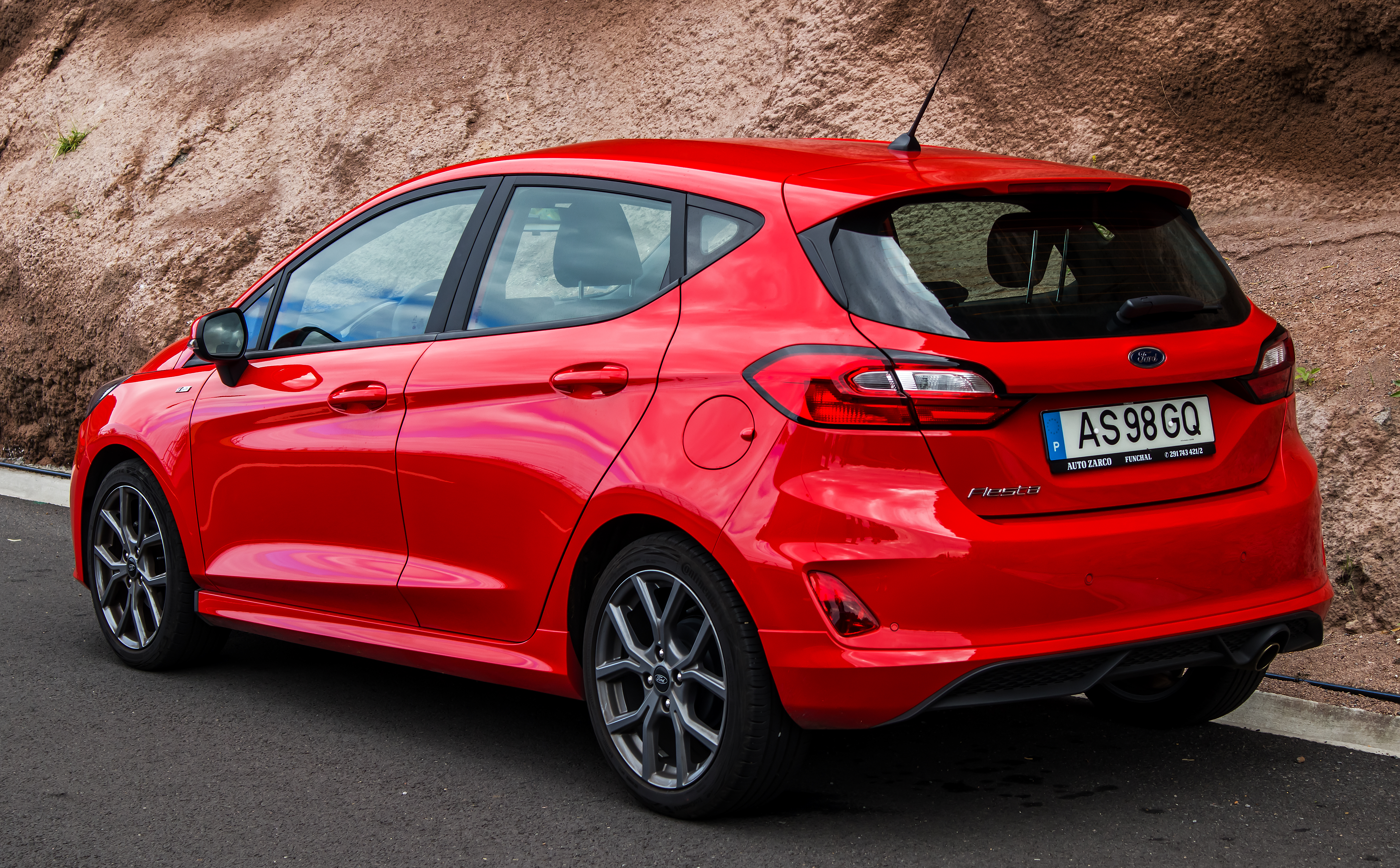
Rear view (facelift)

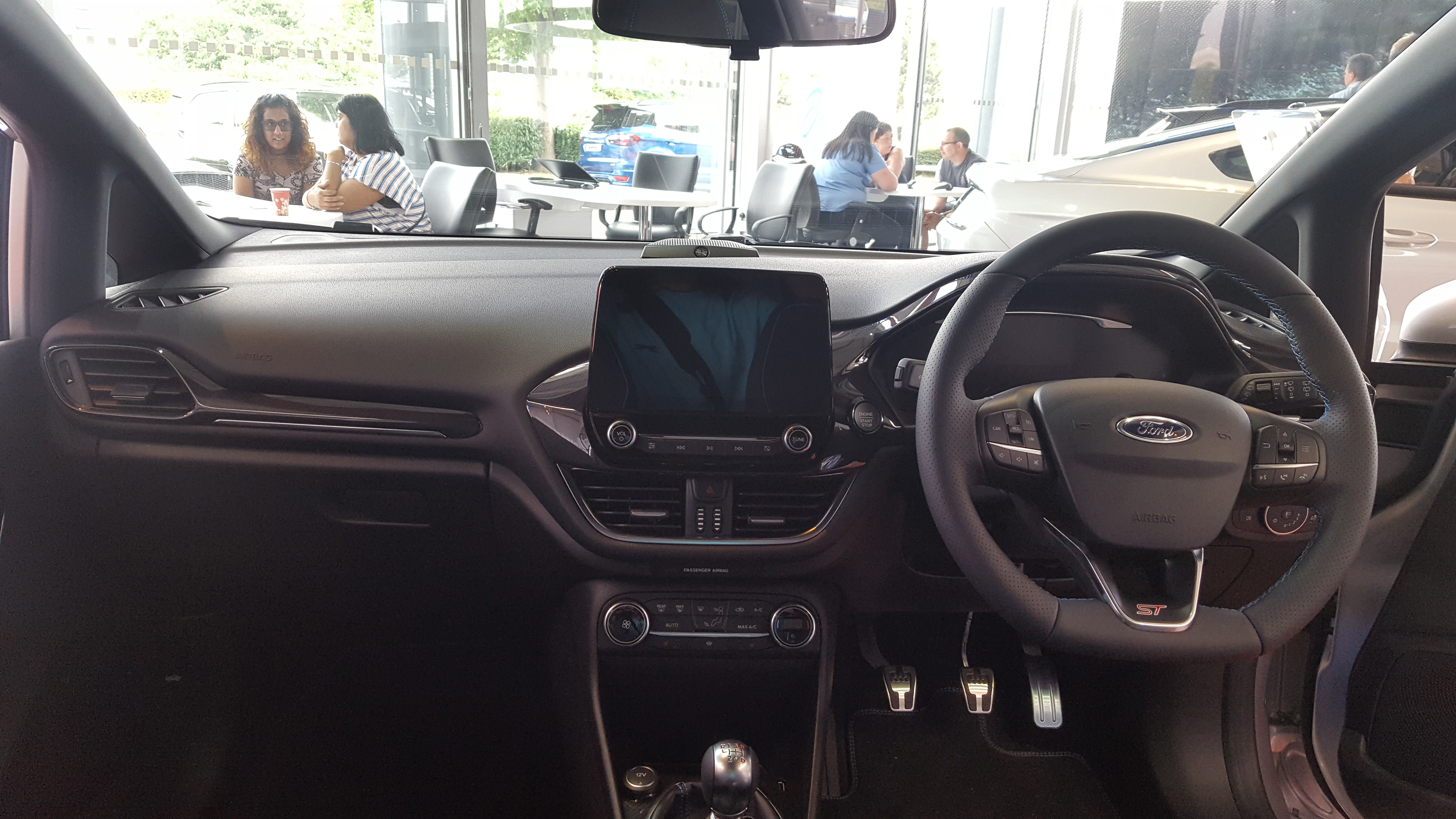
Interior

== Commercial variants ==
All seven generations of the Fiesta have been available in sedan delivery/panel van format, although not in all markets. The Mark I, II, and III versions feature the standard three-door bodyshell with the rear side glass replaced by body-coloured metal and a flat floor pan instead of the rear seats.

In 1991, a "high-cube"-style van based on the Mark III front bodyshell, but with longer wheelbase and Renault-derived rear torsion bar suspension, was introduced and was named the Ford Courier. The Courier continued in the Mark IV style through 2002, when it was replaced by the Ford Transit Connect.

For the Mark V, the standard Fiesta van version was based on the three-door bodyshell rather than the taller five-door version. The Mark VI Fiesta van was first introduced in the European market in mid-2009, a year after the original launch.

== Motorsport ==
=== Rallying ===
Two Ford Fiestas were entered in the 1979 Monte Carlo Rally — the British entry driven by Roger Clark and aided by co-driver Jim Porter, and a German entry piloted by Ari Vatanen and co-driven by David Richards. Both cars were highly modified with special motorsport components throughout and featured pioneering limited-slip differential technology. The cars were powered by competition tuned versions of the 1,600 cc Kent crossflow engine – a later version of which appeared in the Mk 1 Fiesta XR2. The two rally cars performed well in the arduous ice and snow that year. Roger Clark did not set any records but the German car achieved 9th position overall – a very encouraging result, which sparked demand for sportier Fiestas.

Since this, sporting and "hot hatch" editions have been introduced, including Supersport, XR2, S(Sport), XR2i, Si, RS Turbo, RS1800, Zetec S, Zetec RS, and ST. All of these were powered by a range of engines from the Ford Kent to the Ford Duratec engines.

The Ford RallyeConcept in 2002 has been realised through a collaboration between Ford RallyeSport, the motorsport experts behind the Puma Super 1600 and the Focus WRC rally cars, and Ford Design Europe, the team responsible for the new three-door Fiesta on which the RallyeConcept is based. Ford RallyeConcept's marriage of the motorsport engineer's objective for performance functionality with the eye for detail of the designer has been so effective that Ford has committed to an engineering development programme to bring a Fiesta-based rally car to reality. Aiming for FIA homologation by mid-2003, Ford RallyeSport is hoping that it will become Ford's next success story in national and international rallying. The Fiesta Super 1600 debuted at Rally Greece 2004.

The "Fiesta Sporting Trophy" is a One Make Championship; beginning its first season in March 2006, it combines keen competition with equal performance and leaves the decision about winning or losing to the drivers and co-drivers' capabilities. The driver, co-driver, and mechanics work as a team to compete against the toughest adversary of all—the clock.

The Fiesta Sporting Trophy is based around the Fiesta ST Group N car. The car has 165 PS (121 kW; 163 bhp) from the 2 L Duratec ST engine, which when combined with the conversion kit from M-Sport, has been designed to provide all of the safety equipment and performance upgrades to enable the car to be competitive and reliable at any event around the world.

In March 2007, the Pirtek Rally Team introduced the Ford Fiesta Super 2000 rally car, which was to compete in the Australian Rally Championship.

On 18 November 2009, Ford with M-Sport unveiled the Ford Fiesta S2000 Mark VI. Although not due for homologation until January 2010, it was set to make its debut as course car on the final round of the IRC series, Rally Scotland. The car had been built to compete mainly in the Super 2000 World Rally Championship. In 2013, M-Sport developed the Ford Fiesta R5, the successor of the Fiesta S2000; this was based on the 1.6-litre Fiesta ST, and was designed for the Group R5 class of rallying. Fiesta R5 got Evo update in early 2016. With new WRC regulations coming in 2011, M-Sport developed the Fiesta RS WRC, based on Fiesta S2000. It won six WRC rounds in 2011 and 2012, driven by Jari-Matti Latvala, Mikko Hirvonen and Mads Ostberg, but since M-Sport lost most of its manufacturer support for the 2013 season the car hasn't been able to win. In 2013, Thierry Neuville was the world championship runner-up, being a M-Sport junior works driver. Fiesta RS WRC has been very popular among private drivers, due to its good driveability, reasonable price and good availability.

The WRC regulations will be altered for 2017 and M-Sport has thus started developing the Mk7 Fiesta World Rally Car.

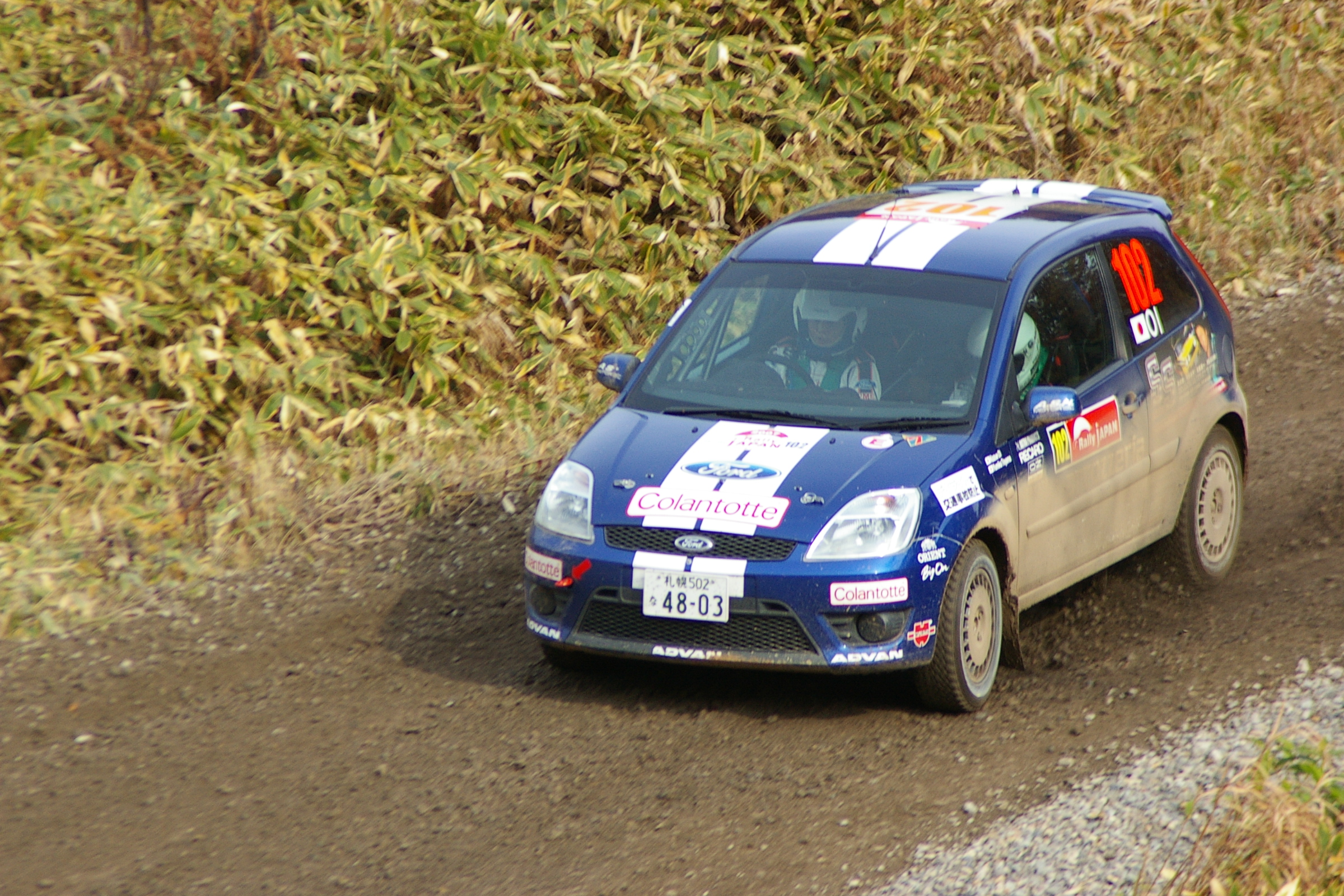
Ford Fiesta Group N rally car by M-Sport

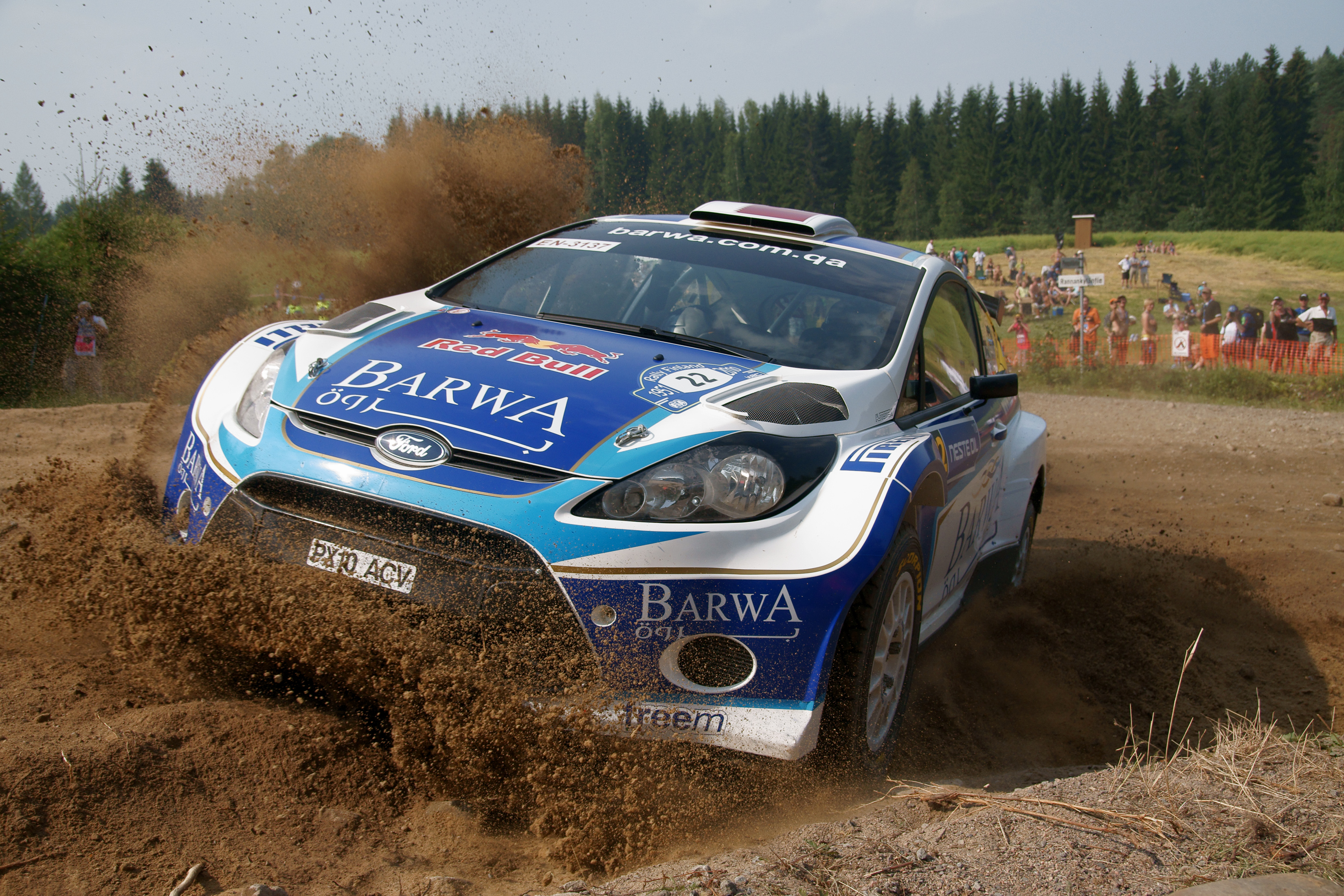
Ford Fiesta S2000

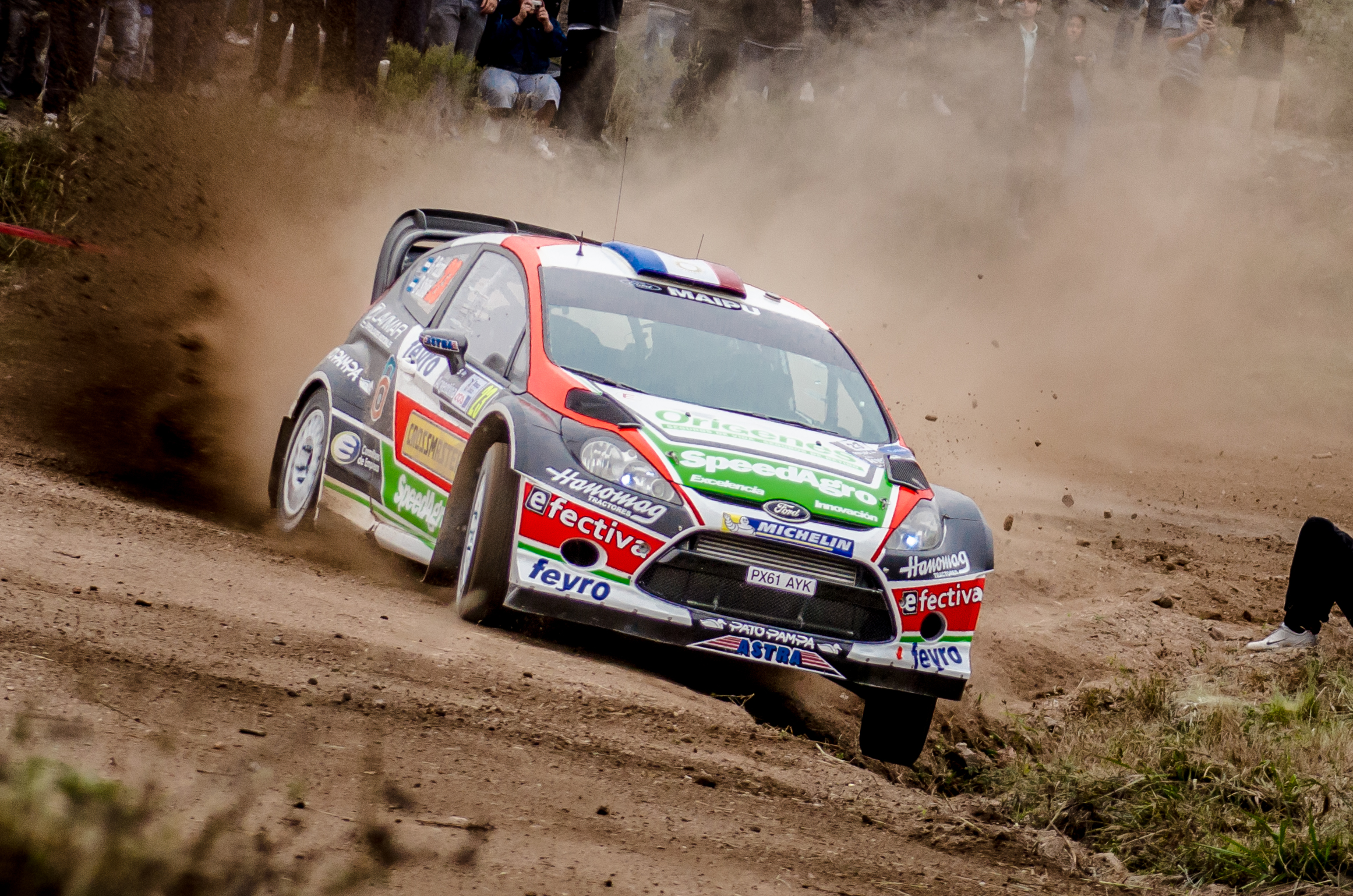
Ford Fiesta RS WRC

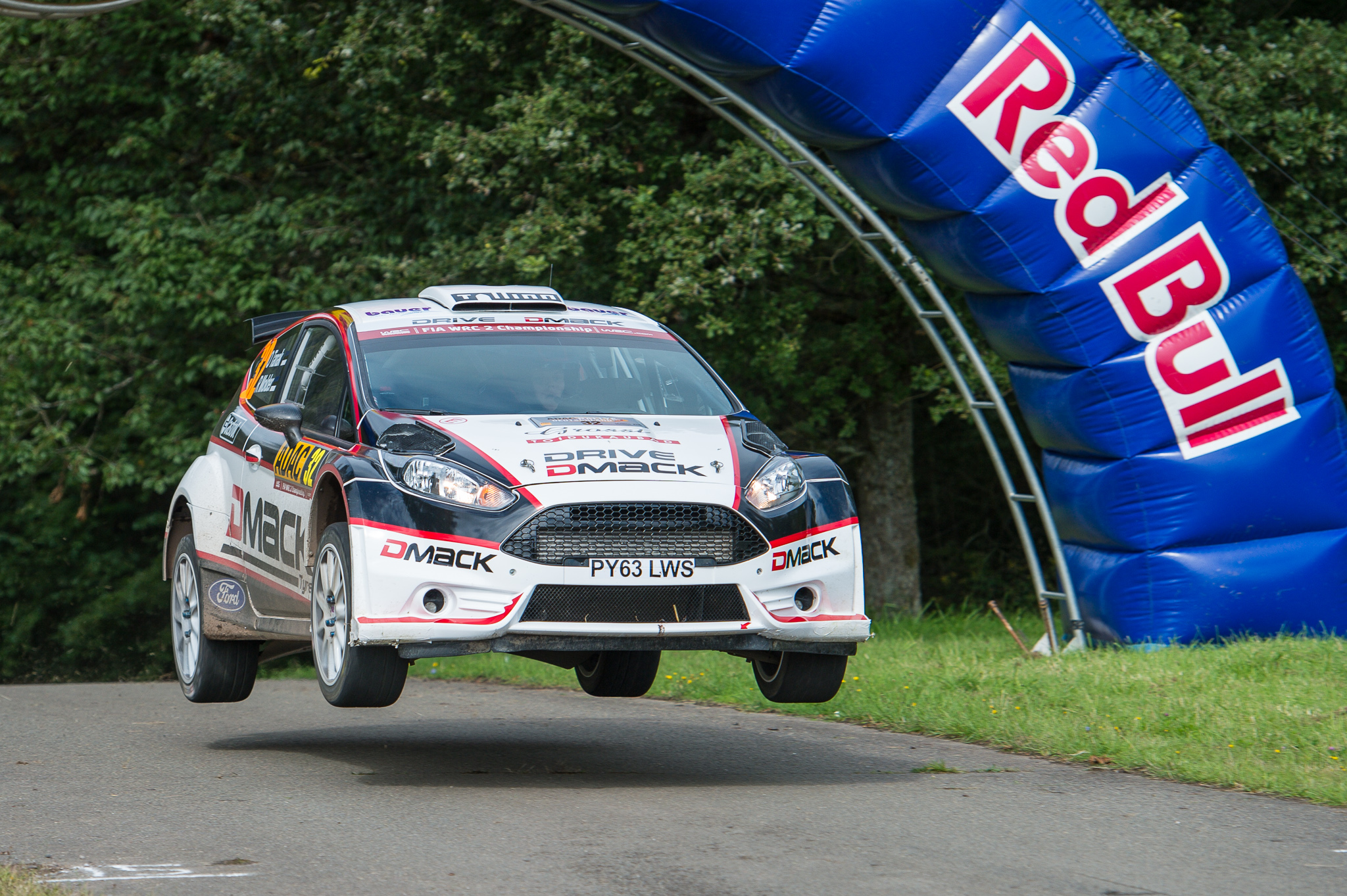
Ford Fiesta R5

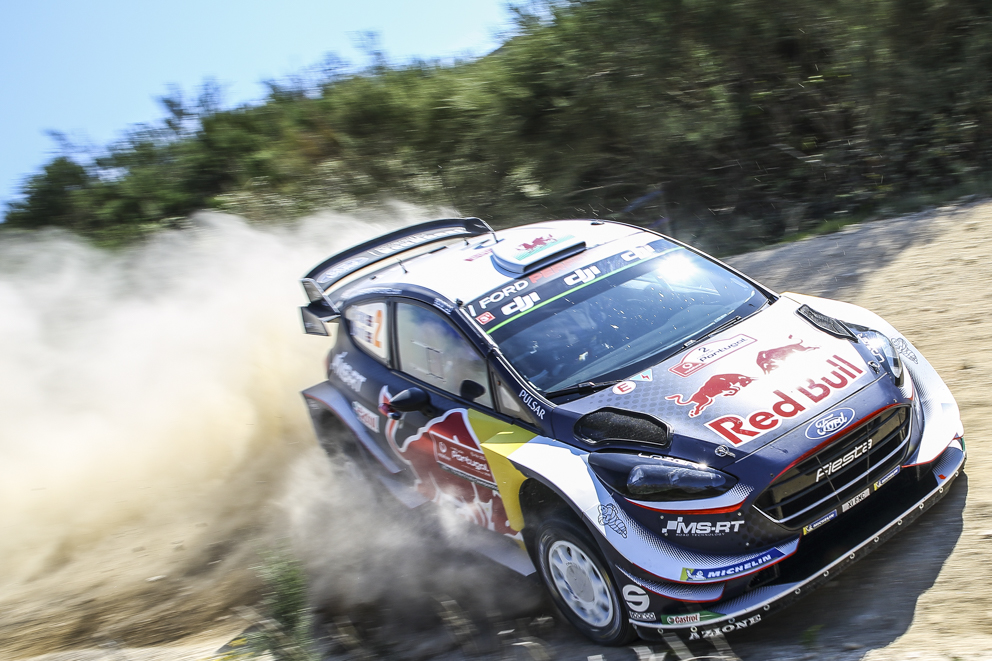
Ford Fiesta WRC

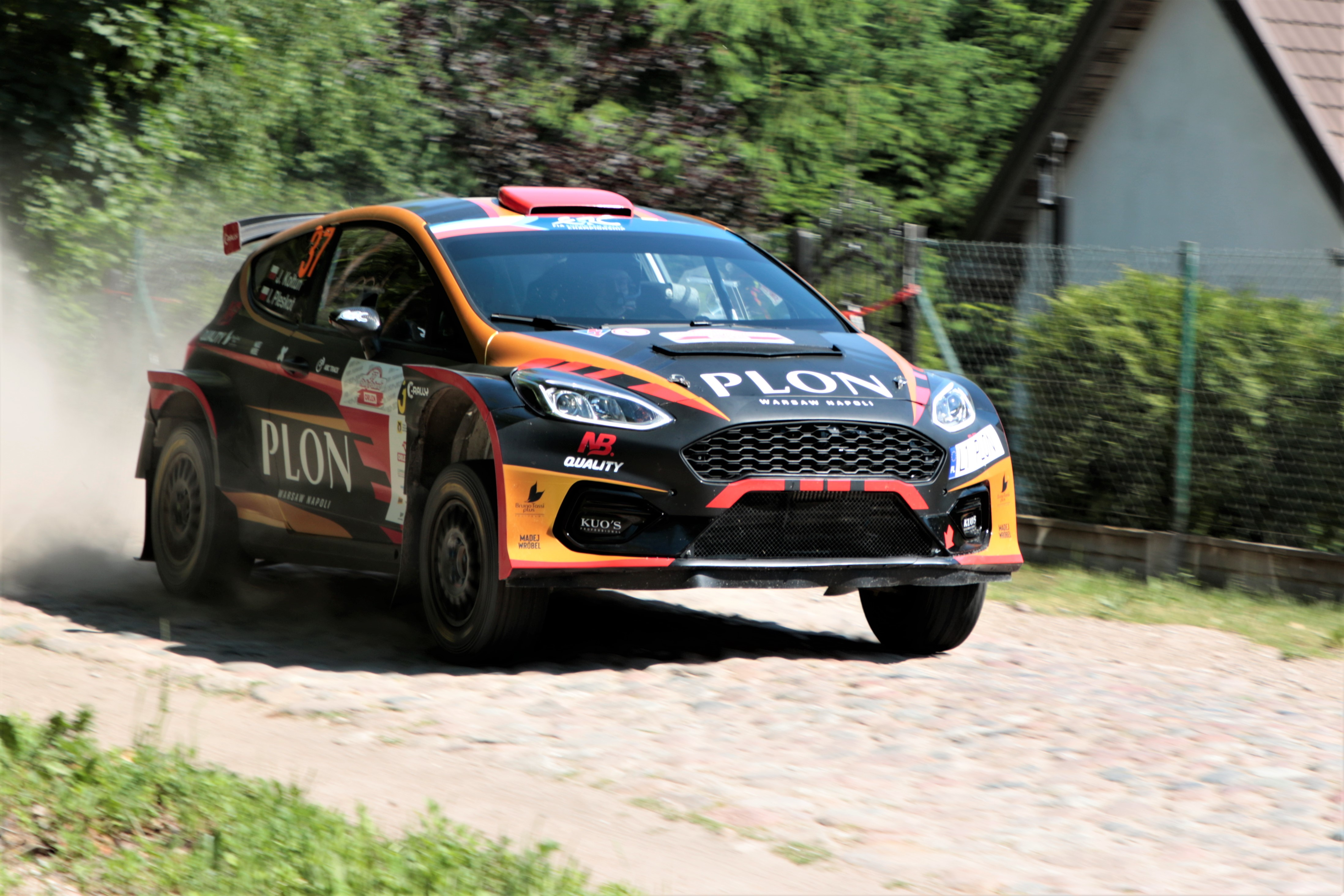
Ford Fiesta Rally2

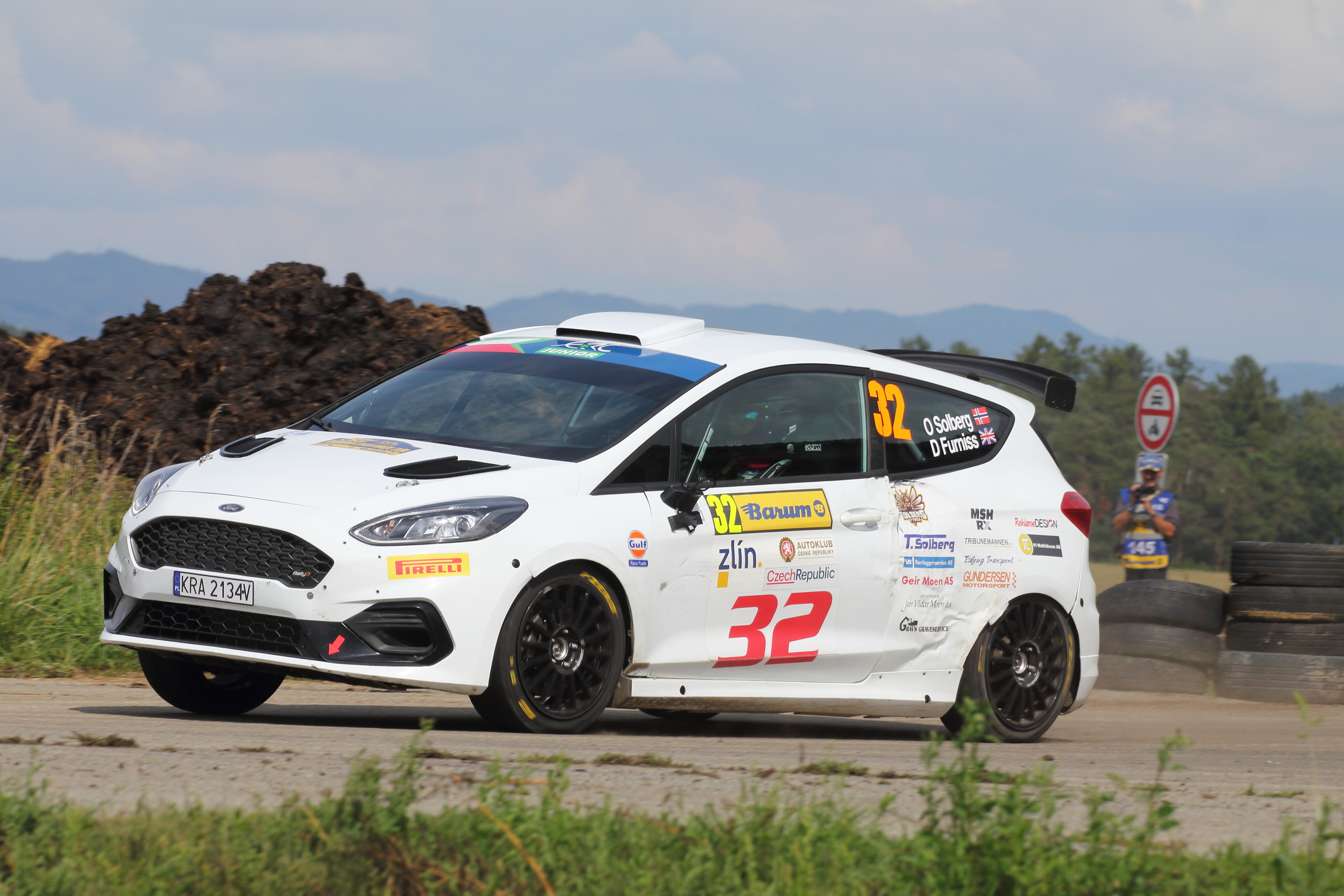
Ford Fiesta Rally3

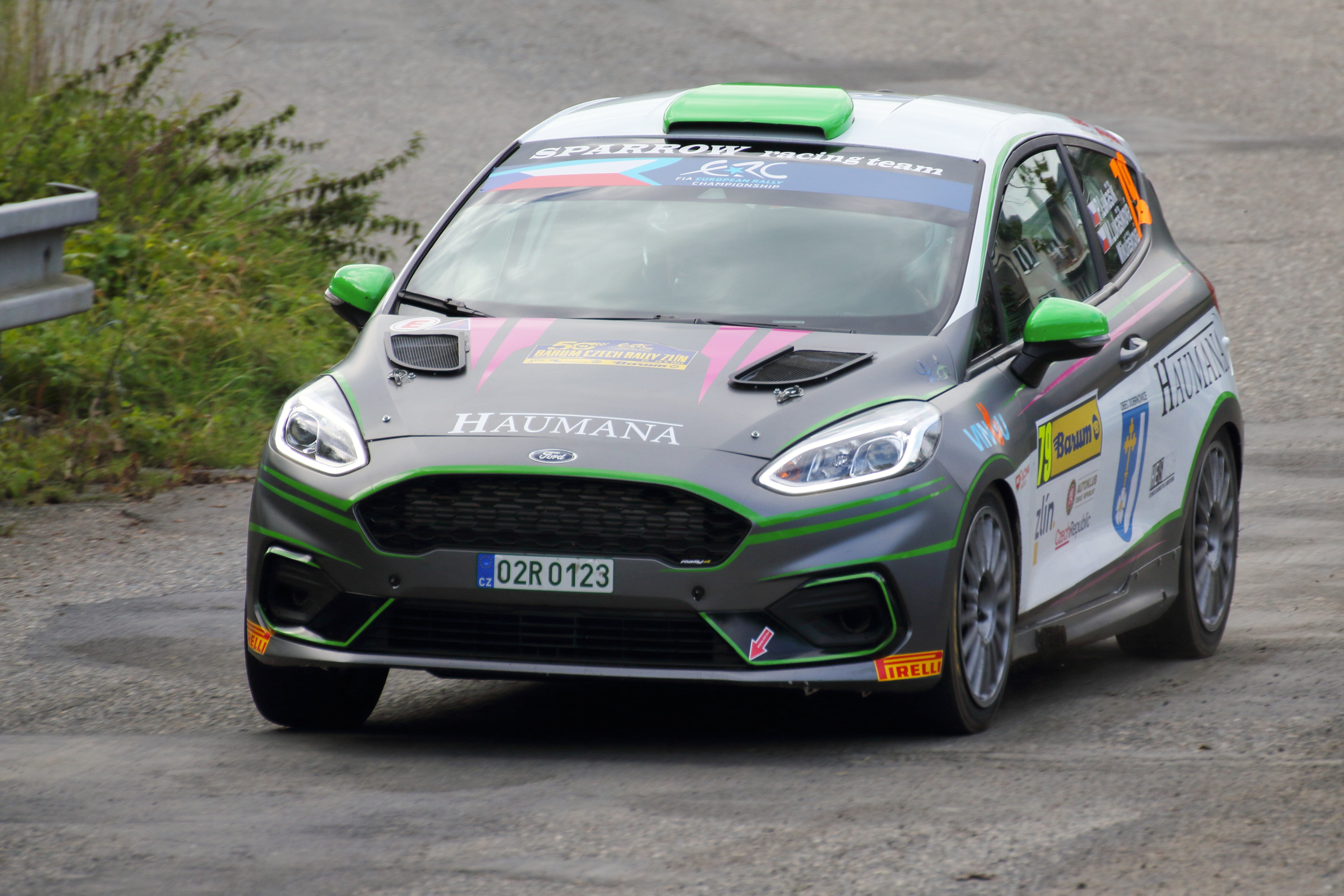
Ford Fiesta Rally4

==== Fiesta ST Group N specifications ====
Engine	1,999 cc (122.0 cu in) Duratec engine. Four cylinders in line, DOHC, 16 valves, alloy cylinder head and block. Electronic multipoint fuel injection.
Power	165 PS (121 kW; 163 bhp) at 5,800 rpm
Torque	202 N⋅m (149 lb⋅ft) at 4,500 rpm
Transmission	Five-speed 'dog' engagement gearkit fitted to standard ST road car casing. Upgraded driveshafts fitted as standard. Plated LSD.
Suspension	Upgraded suspension of ST road car includes revised front knuckles and strengthened twist beam rear axle. Reiger dampers, adjustable for rebound, and revised spring rates. Uprated suspension bushes.
Brakes	Standard ST road car front and rear disc brakes.
Wheels	Gravel: 15-inch OZ Racing wheels Asphalt: 17-inch OZ Racing wheels Wheels manufactured in both Super T and Rally Racing style.
Bodyshell	Multipoint roll cage designed by M-Sport, complying with FIA regulations. Includes three X braces in rear and twin tube door bars with no cross-over.
Electronics	'Piggy back' loom supplements standard loom. Includes electronic circuit breaker and wiring for additional requirements.
Fuel tank	Standard 45 L (9.9 imp gal; 12 U.S. gal) tank with Kevlar composite moulded guard.
Dimensions	Length: 3,921 mm (154.4 in). Width: 1,683 mm (66.3 in). Height: 1,468 mm (57.8 in). Wheelbase: 2,486 mm (97.9 in).

=== Rallycross ===
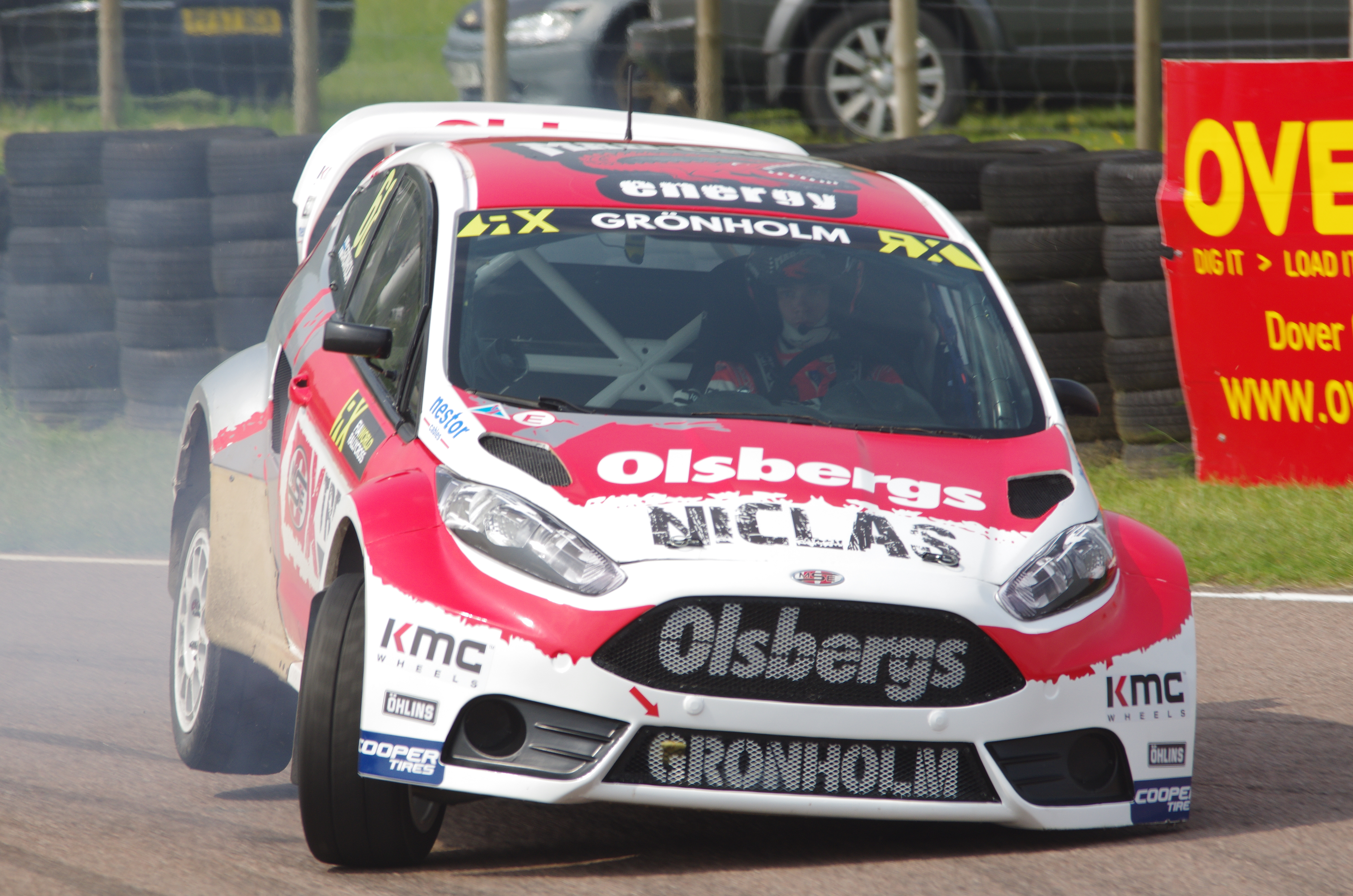
Ford Fiesta of World RX-specification

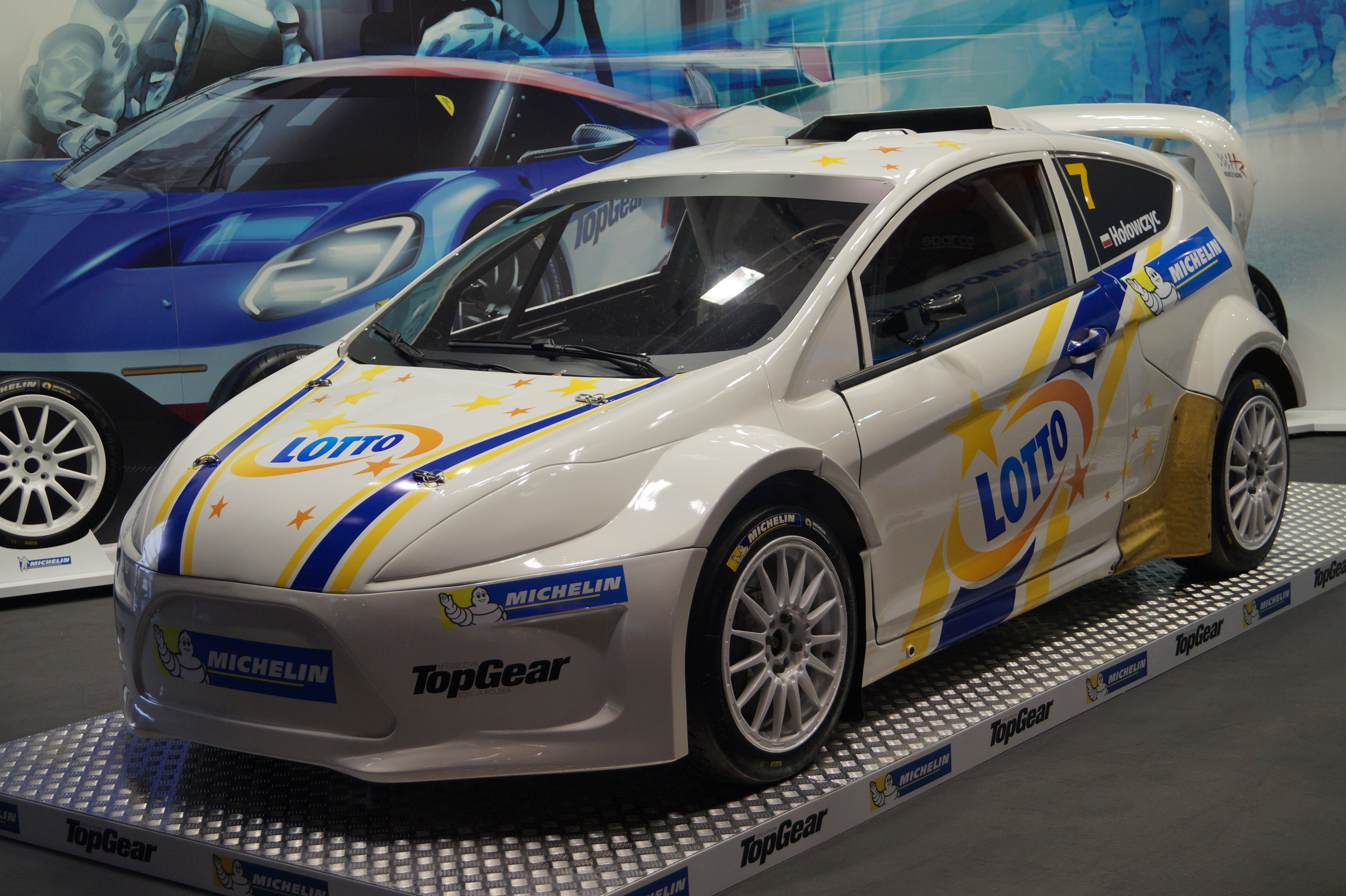
Olsbergs MSE RX Supercar Lite

The Fiesta Rallycross Supercars version is a racecar with a 2.0 L Duratec turbocharged four-cylinder engine, running on petrol or E85 (85% ethanol/15% petrol). It produces over 550 bhp (410 kW; 560 PS) and 820 N⋅m (600 lb⋅ft). That propels the 2,600 lb (1,200 kg) rallycross-prepped Fiesta up to sixty in 2.2 seconds. The cars were more powerful (another 200 bhp) than WRC cars.

The Fiesta Mk6 Rallycross cars made their US debuts in the 2009 Pikes Peak International Hill Climb in Colorado. Swedish team Olsbergs MSE announced the cars would later appear in ESPN's X Games 15 on 2009-08-02. The two Olsbergs MSE Fiesta Mk7 Rallycross cars were based on the Fiesta hatchback model road cars, one with 3 doors, the other one a 5-doors version, but with all-wheel drive, powered by 2.0 L Duratec Ford engines capable of more than 800 bhp (600 kW) (for PPIHC only).

British company M-Sport also builds Fiesta Rallycross Supercars to Global Rallycross Championship teams Hoonigan Racing Division, Chip Ganassi Racing and Bryan Herta Autosport.

Driving a Fiesta, Tanner Foust won the 2011 and 2012 Global RallyCross Championship and was runner-up in the 2011 and 2012 FIA European Rallycross Championship. Toomas Heikkinen won the Global RallyCross Championship in 2013 and Joni Wiman in 2014. Other notable drivers include Marcus Grönholm, Ken Block and Brian Deegan.

An Olsbergs MSE RX Supercar Lite from FIA Rallycross Lite is also based on Ford FIesta.

=== Circuit racing ===
In the UK, the Fiesta is commonly used in club level motorsport series and has a national one-make series called the Ford Fiesta Championship. The series was initially launched in 1979 as the Faberge Fiesta Challenge, intended for female drivers. The series is notable for launching the career of rally driver Louise Aitken-Walker.

During its peak in the 1980s and 1990s, it had manufacturer support and it even was a support race to the British Grand Prix and numerous British Touring Car Championship rounds. The series has gone through numerous name changes including Ford Credit Fiesta Championship, Ford Fiesta Zetec Championship and BRSCC Ford Si Challenge and is nowadays run by the BRSCC (British Racing and Sports Car Club) as a club racing championship. The organisation also run the other series that consists of Fiestas.

- Ford XR Challenge, for XR2 and XR2i models, also consists of the Escort XR models.
- Ford Saloon Championship, mainly for a wider range of Ford models but Fiestas are mostly seen in classes C and E with a Mk 4 example winning the title outright in 2006 at the hands of Ollie Allen.

The car has also been raced in the Touring-Light division of the Russian Touring Car Championship.

Fiesta drivers won the Super 1600 class of the European Touring Car Cup seven times from 2008 to 2016.

== Sales and popularity ==
The Fiesta has been Britain's most popular new car in 1990, 1991, 1996, 1997, 1998 and each year from 2009 to 2020, by the time of the MK2 Fiesta's demise in early 1989, just under 1,300,000 had been sold in Britain since its launch 12 years earlier, In June 2014 Ford claimed the largest market share in the UK, of 12.87% – and almost half of those registrations belonged to the Fiesta. By July 2014, the Fiesta became the UK's best-selling car of all time, with 4,115,000 sold.

Year	Worldwide	Europe (incl. UK)	UK	US	Canada	Mexico	Thailand	China	Brazil
1976	109,838								
1977	440,969								
1978	449,807			81,273					
1979	444,402			77,733					
1980	450,927		91,661	68,841					
1981	357,105		110,753	47,707					
1982	327,568								
1983	356,517		119,602						
1984			125,851						
1985			124,143						
1986									
1987			153,453						
1988									
1989									
1990			151,475						
1991			117,139						
1992			106,595						
1993			110,449						
1994			123,723						
1995			129,574						
1996			139,522						
1997		423,936							
1998		384,085	116,110						
1999		306,014	99,830						
2000		275,333							
2001		255,123	98,221						42,559
2002		294,326	93,591						66,926
2003		310,774	95,887					4,499	70,074
2004		335,925	89,295					14,327	74,174
2005		345,124	83,803					9,870	99,869
2006		353,713	103,856					2,402	96,653
2007		355,776	102,872						112,498
2008		327,851	94,989			13,293			96,765
2009		459,006	117,296			5,989		44,936	114,978
2010		403,631	103,013	23,273	4,423	5,602		75,198	135,073
2011		349,429	96,112	68,574	13,064	9,936		63,990	131,903
2012		305,071	109,265	56,775	11,817	12,982		52,007	161,055
2013		292,715	121,929	71,073	9,851	13,716		49,083	173,512
2014		308,345	131,254	63,192	9,312		5,595	62,519	132,338
2015		313,610	133,434	64,458	5,646	16,410	3,100	15,799	47,583
2016		298,999	120,525	48,807	3,093	14,315	409	1,413	18,624
2017		255,602	94,533	46,249	1,838	7,028	203		19,474
2018		270,931	95,892	51,730	1,323	4,254			16,073
2019		228,959	77,833	60,148	1,263	1,726			3,376
2020		156,067	49,174	3,354					21
2021		86,385							5
2022		72,365							4

== Awards and recognition ==
The 2011 Fiesta was one of the five finalists for the 2011 Green Car of the Year awarded by the Green Car Journal in November 2010, competing with two plug-in electric vehicles, the Nissan Leaf and the Chevrolet Volt (the winner), and two hybrid electric vehicles.

- Winner of UK Design Council Efficiency Award for "exemplary contribution to the reduction of running and maintenance costs" in 1978. The award was presented by Prince Philip.
- Winner Australia's Best Small Car in 2004.
- Winner of Business Standard Motoring Jury Award, 2006.
- What Car's Best Used Supermini for 2006 – 1.4 Zetec 3dr 2003 – Runner-up Toyota Yaris 1.0 T2 3dr 2003.
- Winner of Brazilian Auto Esporte magazine Car of the Year in 2005 (Fiesta Sedan).
- Winner of Game Informer magazine Best Racing Games of the Year For Best Car in 2011 (Fiesta Gymkhana Car).
- Named Scottish Car of the Year 2008 at the 11th annual Association of Scottish Motoring Writers (ASMW) awards dinner in St Andrew's, Scotland.
- Named 'Car of the Year 1989' by Britain's What Car? magazine.
- Named 'Car of the Year 2009' by Britain's What Car? magazine.
- Named 'Semperit Irish Small car of the Year' by tyre manufacturer Semperit
- Named 'Car of the Year' and 'Best Supermini' in Auto Express magazine's New Car Awards 2009.
- Fiesta ECOnetic named 'Least boring green car' of 2009 by Top Gear's James May.
- First minicar to achieve Top Safety Pick by the US Insurance Institute for Highway Safety (IIHS) based on front-, side- and rear-impact crash testing and roof-strength.
- Winner of the 2011 AJAC Car of the year award for Best Small Car under $21,000.
- Named 'Supermini of the Year 2013' by Britain's What Car?
- Named 'Used Car of the Year 2012' by UK's CAP Black Book Car Guide.
- Fiesta ST chosen Top Gear's Car of the Year 2013
- Best Driver's Car Award – Bloomberg-UTV Autocar India Awards
- Business Standard Motoring Jury Award 2006
- Fiesta ST awarded Winner 'Best Performance Car Under $100k ' in 2015 by Carsales during their Car of the Year in Australia.
- Fiesta ST awarded Top Gear (TG) Magazine's car of the year 2019 –
- Fiesta ST named Parker's car of the year 2019
- Fiesta named as 'Car Buyer car of the year 2019' and Fiesta ST named as 'Car Buyer hot hatch of the year 2019'

== Discontinuation ==
In October 2022, Ford executives announced the discontinuation of the Ford Fiesta, as costs of parts increase and drivers opt for SUVs. This will also allow the company to focus on electrifying its lineup. The last Ford Fiesta left the production line in Cologne, Germany, on 7 July 2023. The final two Ford Fiestas will be kept by Ford, one will join Ford's international heritage fleet, and another Fiesta will join Ford's UK heritage fleet.

== See also ==
- Ford Ikon
