= Lincoln C =

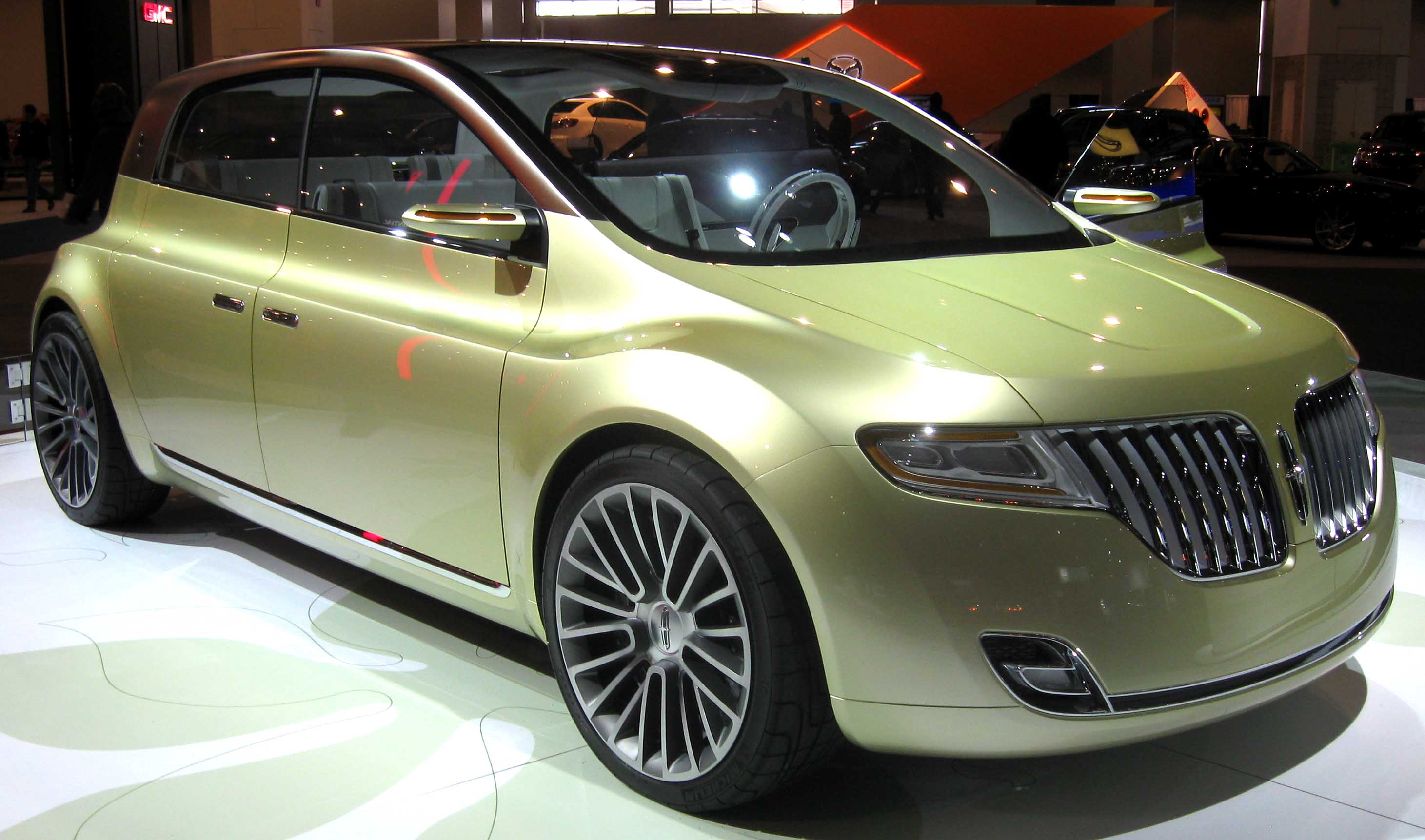

Overview
- Manufacturer: Lincoln (Ford)
- Production: 2009 (Concept car)

Body and chassis
- Class: Compact car
- Body style: 5-door hatchback
- Layout: FF layout
- Platform: Ford Global C platform
- Doors: Conventional doors (front); Coach Doors (rear)
- Related: Ford Focus

Powertrain
- Engine: 2.0 L EcoBoost I4
- Transmission: 6-speed automatic

Chronology
- Successor: Lincoln MKC

The Lincoln C was a concept car manufactured by Lincoln, which was unveiled at the 2009 North American International Auto Show.

It included a 1.6-liter EcoBoost engine rated at 180 hp (134 kW) and 180 lb⋅ft (244 N⋅m) of torque, with a dry dual-clutch PowerShift 6-speed transmission. The Ford Sync system featured a female avatar called Eva, which could be customized.

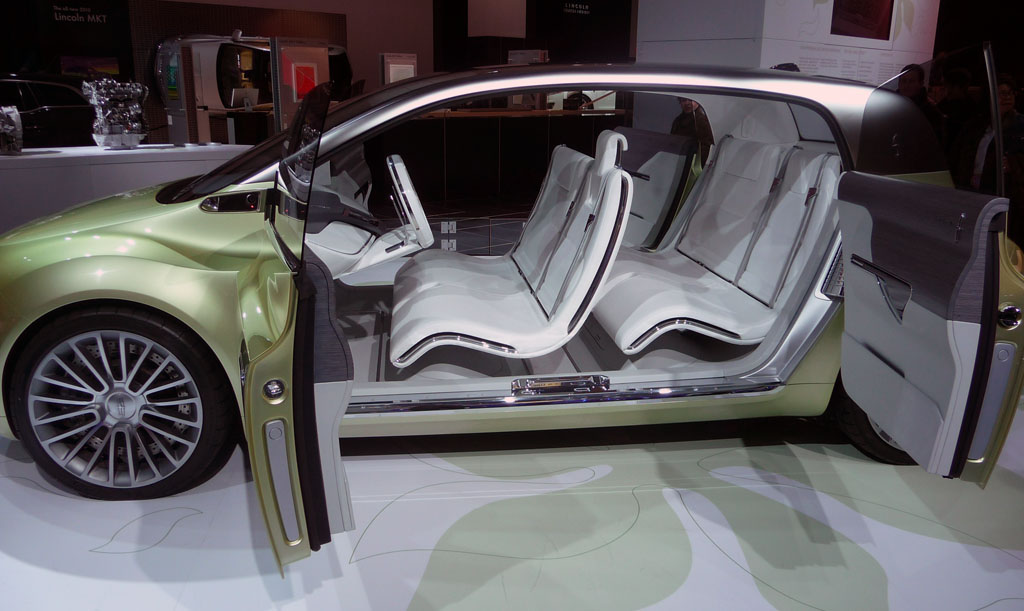
Doors open, showing the interior

A production version of the Lincoln C concept has never been officially announced or unveiled, but the concept remained on the official Lincoln website as a "future vehicle." With Ford having canceled the Mercury brand and investing heavily in Lincoln, Ford canceled the C concept and its successor was the Lincoln MKC concept unveiled in 2013.
