= VUHL =

Mexican automobile company

EXTE Diseño, S.A. de C.V.
- Company type: Private
- Industry: Automotive
- Founded: 2010; 16 years ago
- Founder: Iker Echeverría; Guillermo Echeverría
- Headquarters: Santiago de Querétaro, Querétaro, Mexico
- Area served: Worldwide
- Website: vuhl05.com

VUHL is a manufacturer of high performance automobiles, headquartered in Mexico. The company was founded by brothers Guillermo and Iker Echeverria.

== Products ==
The company's only product to date is the VUHL 05, a road-legal lightweight supercar. The cars can be purchased in the U.K. through the dealer Bespoke Performance.

According to the company's website, VUHL stands for "Vehicles of Ultra-Lightweight and High Performance".

== See also ==
- DINA S.A.
- Mastretta
- Cars in Mexico
