= Ford EcoBoost engine =

Series of turbocharged, direct-injection gasoline engines

Overview
- Manufacturer: Ford
- Also called: TwinForce (obsolete); EcoBoost SCTi; GTDi
- Production: 2009–present

Layout
- Configuration: I3, I4 and 60° V6
- Displacement: V6 3.5 L (3,496 cc; 213.3 cu in); V6 3.0 L (2,967 cc; 181.1 cu in); V6 2.7 L (2,694 cc; 164.4 cu in); I4 2.3 L (2,261 cc; 138.0 cu in); I4 2.0 L (1,999 cc; 122.0 cu in); I4 1.6 L (1,596 cc; 97.4 cu in); I4 1.5 L (1,500 cc; 91.5 cu in); I3 1.5 L (1,497 cc; 91.4 cu in); I3 1.0 L (995 cc; 60.7 cu in)
- Cylinder bore: V6 3.5: 92.5 mm (3.64 in); V6 3.0: 85.3 mm (3.36 in); V6 2.7: 83 mm (3.27 in); I4 2.3: 87.55 mm (3.45 in); I4 2.3 "MPC": 84 mm (3.31 in); I4 2.0: 87.5 mm (3.44 in); I4 1.6: 79.0 mm (3.11 in); I3 1.5: 84 mm (3.31 in); I3 1.0: 71 mm (2.80 in)
- Piston stroke: V6 3.5: 86.7 mm (3.41 in); V6 3.0: 86 mm (3.39 in); V6 2.7: 83 mm (3.27 in); I4 2.3: 94.0 mm (3.70 in); I4 2.3 "MPC": 102 mm (4.02 in); I4 2.0: 83.1 mm (3.27 in); I4 1.6: 81.4 mm (3.20 in); I3 1.5: 90 mm (3.54 in); I3 1.0: 82 mm (3.23 in)
- Cylinder block material: V6 2.7: Compacted graphite iron I3 1.0 and 1.1: Cast iron All others: Aluminum
- Cylinder head material: Aluminum
- Valvetrain: DOHC with direct acting mechanical buckets or roller finger followers Variable camshaft timing
- Compression ratio: V6 3.5: 10.0:1 (10.5:1 MY2017); V6 3.0: 9.5:1; V6 2.7: 10.3:1; I4 2.3: 9.5:1; I4 2.3 "MPC": 10.6:1; I4 2.0: 10.0:1; I4 1.6: 10.0:1; I3 1.5: 9.7:1

Combustion
- Turbocharger: V6: Dual Borg Warner K03 low inertia integrated turbo system; I4 2.3: Garrett Motion (Honeywell) twin-scroll MGT2260SZ (Mustang Ecoboost); I4 2.0: Borg Warner K03 low inertia integrated turbo system; I4 1.6: Borg Warner KP39 low inertia turbo; I3 1.5: Continental RAAX low-inertia turbocharger
- Fuel system: Gasoline direct injection or dual injection/PFDI
- Management: V6: Bosch; I4 2.0: Bosch MED17 with CAN-Bus and individual cylinder knock control; I4 1.6: Bosch MED17 with CAN-Bus and individual cylinder knock control; I3 1.5: Bosch MG1CS016 with CAN-Bus and individual cylinder knock control. FGEC software
- Fuel type: Gasoline
- Oil system: Wet sump
- Cooling system: Water-cooled

Dimensions
- Dry weight: V6 3.5: 449 lb (204 kg); V6 3.0: 445 lb (202 kg); V6 2.7: 440 lb (200 kg); I4 2.0: 328 lb (149 kg); I4 1.6: 251 lb (114 kg); I3 1.0: 213 lb (97 kg)

Chronology
- Predecessor: for Straight-4: Ford Duratec; for V6: Ford Duratec V6, Mazda MZI 35, Mazda GY

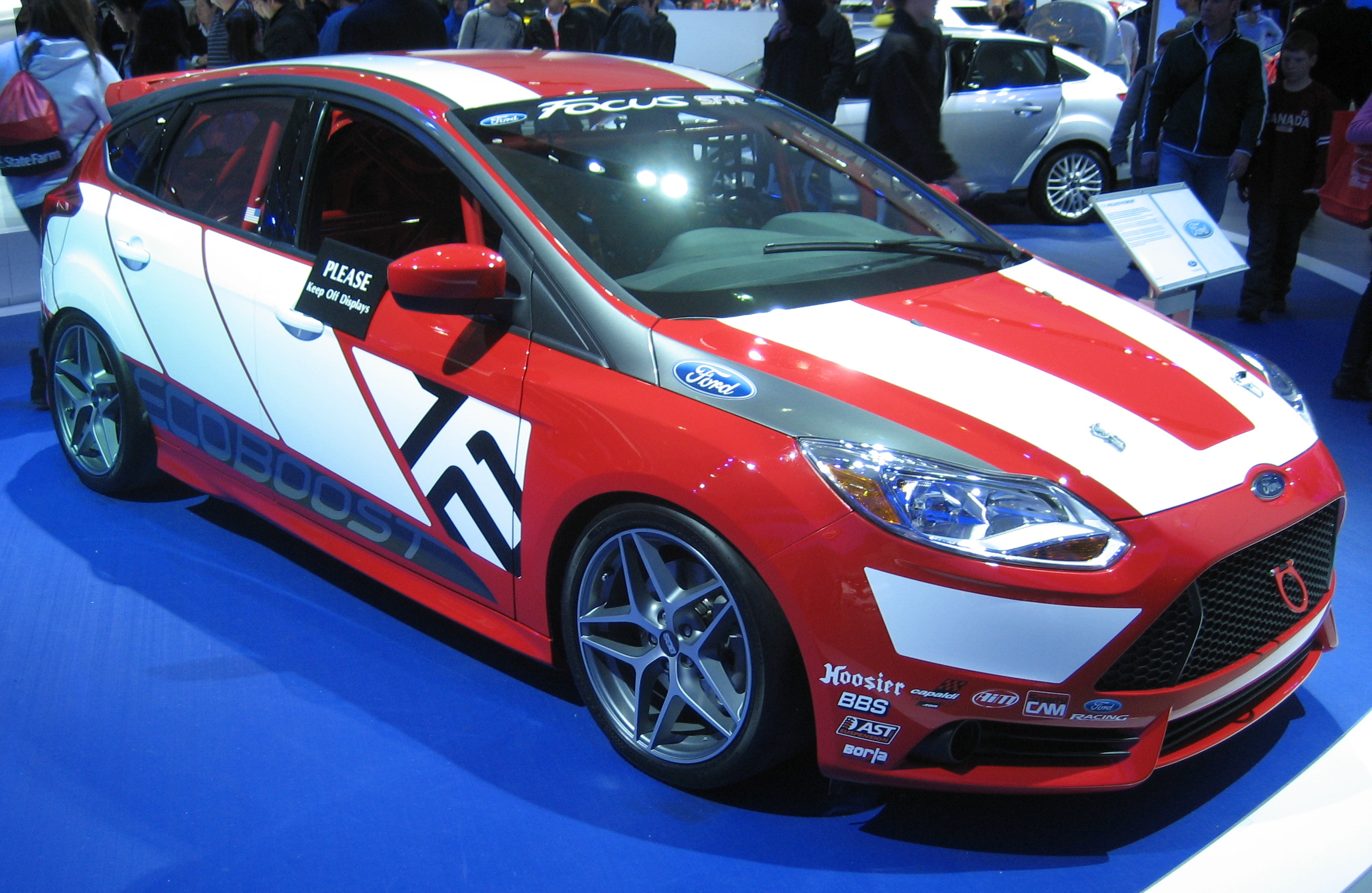
Ford Focus EcoBoost race car

EcoBoost is a series of turbocharged, direct-injection gasoline engines produced by Ford and originally co-developed by FEV Inc. (now FEV North America Inc.). EcoBoost engines are designed to deliver power and torque consistent with those of larger-displacement (cylinder volume) naturally aspirated engines, while achieving up to 20% better fuel efficiency and 15% fewer greenhouse emissions, according to Ford. The manufacturer sees the EcoBoost technology as less costly and more versatile than further developing or expanding the use of hybrid and diesel engine technologies. EcoBoost engines are broadly available across the Ford vehicle lineup.

== Global production ==
EcoBoost gasoline direct-injection turbocharged engine technology adds 128 patents and patent applications to Ford's 4,618 active and thousands of pending US patents. Some of the costs of US development and production were assisted by the $5.9 billion Advanced Technology Vehicles Manufacturing Loan Program of the Department of Energy.

The V6 EcoBoost engines are being assembled at Cleveland Engine Plant No. 1 in Brook Park, Ohio. The 2.0-liter I4 EcoBoost engines were produced at the Ford Valencia Plant in Spain in 2009. The 1.6-liter I4 EcoBoost engines are assembled at the Ford Bridgend Engine Plant in the United Kingdom. The smaller 1000cc-displacement 3 cylinder EcoBoost engine is produced both at Ford Germany in Cologne and at Ford Romania in Craiova.

By 2012, the company planned to produce 750,000 EcoBoost units annually in the US and 1.3 million globally in the world market. Ford expected over 90% of its global vehicle lineup (includes North America) to offer EcoBoost engine technology by 2013. From the engine's beginning to November 2012, 500,000 Ford EcoBoost vehicles have been sold.

During Ford's ownership of Volvo (until 2010), it used the term PTDi (petrol turbocharged direct injection) for the 1.6 L I4 engine when introducing Volvo S60 concept and for the 2.0 L I4 engine when introducing Volvo XC60.

=== Safety issues ===
Ford has had to refund hundreds of customers worldwide because Ford EcoBoost engines in their vehicles have overheated and, in some cases, caused engine fires. In 2015, a South African man died after becoming trapped in his Ford Kuga after its 1.6-litre EcoBoost engine burst into flames. In 2017, Ford South Africa recalled all Kugas in the country for engine checks.

== Engine family list ==
| Name | Family | Displacement | Year | Features |
|---|---|---|---|---|
| EcoBoost 1.0 | Fox | 999 cc (61.0 cu in) | 2012–present | DOHC I3 |
| Ti-VCT 1.1 | Fox | 1,084 cc (66.1 cu in) | 2017–present | DOHC I3 |
| EcoBoost 1.5 | Ford Sigma engine | 1,500 cc (92 cu in) | 2014–2020 | DOHC I4 |
| EcoBoost 1.5 | Dragon | 1,497 cc (91.4 cu in) | 2017–present | DOHC I3 |
| EcoBoost 1.6 | Ford Sigma engine | 1,596 cc (97.4 cu in) | 2010–2019 | DOHC I4 |
| EcoBoost 2.0 | Mazda L engine | 1,999 cc (122.0 cu in) | 2010–2018 | DOHC I4 |
| EcoBoost 2.0 twin scroll | Clean-sheet engine block | 1,999 cc (122.0 cu in) | 2015–2021 | DOHC I4 |
| EcoBoost 2.0 | | 1,995 cc (121.7 cu in) | 2022–present | DOHC I4 |
| EcoBoost 2.3 | Mazda L engine | 2,261 cc (138.0 cu in) | 2015–2024 | DOHC I4 |
| EcoBoost 2.3 "MPC" | | 2,261 cc (138.0 cu in) | 2024-present | DOHC I4 |
| EcoBoost 2.7 | Nano | 2,694 cc (164.4 cu in) | 2015–2026 | DOHC V6 |
| EcoBoost 3.0 | Nano | 2,967 cc (181.1 cu in) | 2016–present | DOHC V6 |
| EcoBoost 3.5 | Cyclone | 3,496 cc (213.3 cu in) | 2010–present | DOHC V6 |

== Inline three-cylinder ==
=== 1.0 L Fox ===
1.0 L Ecoboost Fox I-3
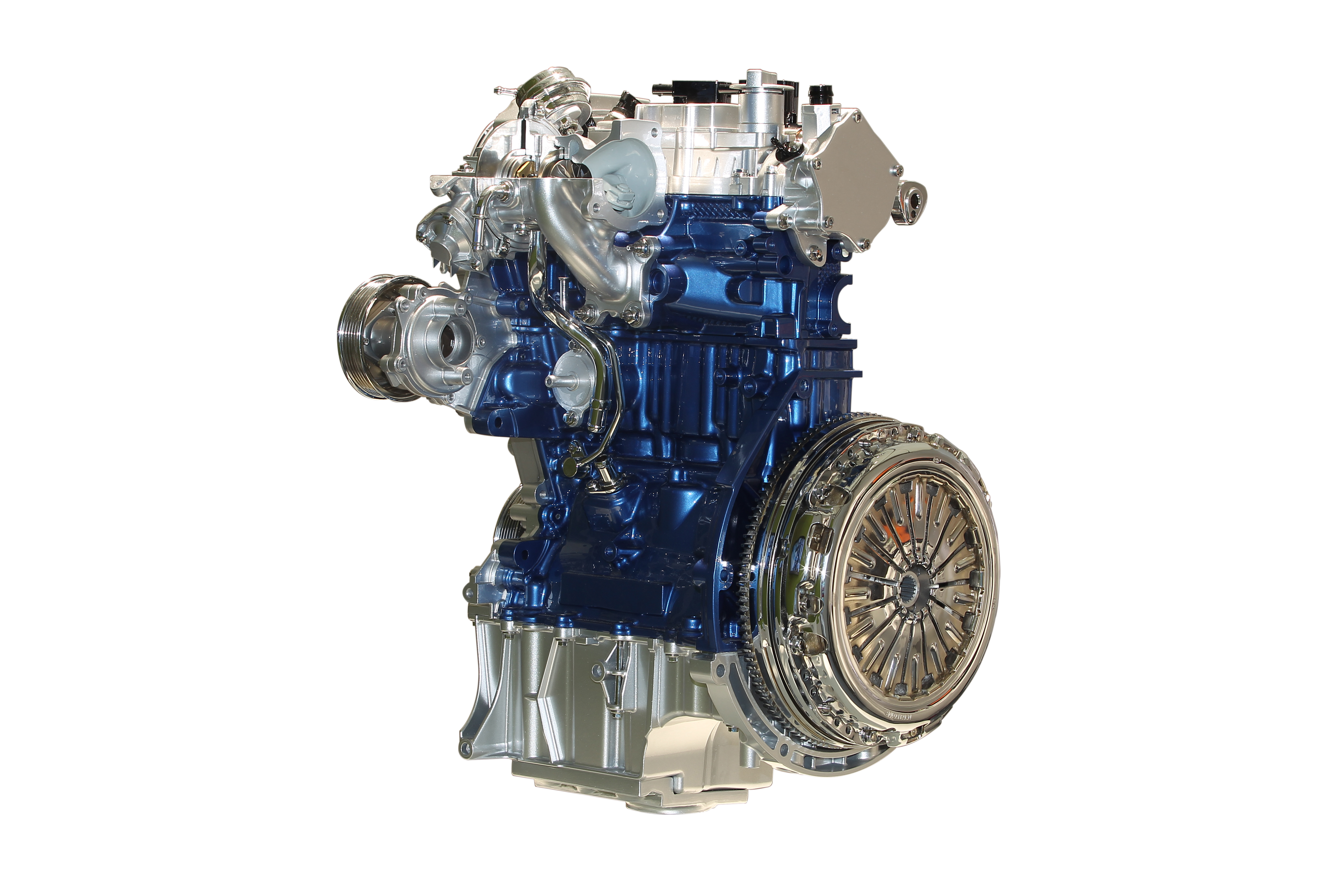

Layout
- Configuration: Inline-3
- Displacement: 999 cc (61.0 cu in)
- Cylinder bore: 71.9 mm (2.83 in)
- Piston stroke: 82.0 mm (3.23 in)
- Cylinder block material: Cast iron
- Cylinder head material: Cast aluminum
- Valvetrain: 12 valve DOHC
- Valvetrain drive system: Wet belt (2012-2019), chain (2019-present),.
- Compression ratio: 10.0-10.5:1

Combustion
- Turbocharger: Single Continental radial-axial
- Fuel system: Direct injection
- Management: Bosch MED17 Vitesco EMS2916 (MHEV)
- Oil system: Electronically controlled variable displacement oil pump

Ford produces a 1.0 L turbocharged in-line three-cylinder engine for the EcoBoost family developed at Ford's Dunton Technical Centre in the UK. Production started in April 2012. The 1.0 was built initially in two versions: 74 kW (101 PS; 99 hp) and 88 to 92 kW (120 to 125 PS; 118 to 123 hp).

Both versions deliver a maximum of 170 N⋅m (125 lbf⋅ft) from 1,400 to 4,500 rpm, whereas higher performing versions can provide up to 200 N⋅m (148 lb⋅ft) on overboost for 30 seconds, which makes for a broad torque curve when compared to a naturally aspirated gasoline engine. A 140 PS (103 kW; 138 hp) version has also been released in the Fiesta Red Edition and Black Edition (some markets), as well as the Focus ST-Line, with 210 N⋅m (155 lb⋅ft) of torque. The engine block is cast iron, which offers, in addition to the required strength, up to 50% faster warm-up than aluminum, at the expense of additional weight.

To quell the natural vibrations of a three-cylinder design, unspecified efforts have been made in the flywheel design to ensure satisfactorily smooth running without the use of energy sapping balance shafts. The 1.0L EcoBoost GTDI engine uses an oil-bathed timing belt, commonly known as a "wet belt".

The engine is packaged in an engine block with a footprint the size of an A4 sheet of paper. With the introduction of the face-lifted 2013 Ford Fiesta, Ford introduced a naturally aspirated version of 1.0 Fox engine. The two versions produce 65 hp (48 kW; 66 PS) and 80 hp (60 kW; 81 PS), and both engines use direct injection and Ti-VCT like the turbocharged versions. Start-stop technology is also available.

The engines are produced in Cologne (Germany), Craiova (Romania) and Chongqing (China). Production is expected to be 700,000–1,500,000 units per year.

The 1.0 L EcoBoost engine was introduced to the American market with the 2014 Ford Fiesta sedan and hatchback, although cars with this engine did not sell particularly well. It was announced at the 2012 Los Angeles Auto Show, when the Fiesta was introduced. The 123-hp version debuted in the North American market Focus in the 2015 model year. The engine accounted for less than 5 percent of Fiesta and Focus sales in the U.S., according to a 2017 report. The 1.0 L engine was awarded the International Engine of Year Award 2016, making it the Best Engine Under 1.0 L for the fifth time in a row. After the discontinuation of the Focus and Fiesta in North America, the 1.0 L was only available there in the EcoSport until 2022.

In 2017 Ford was again awarded International Engine of Year (for Engines Under 1.0 L) with a largely reconfigured version of the Ecoboost 1.0. Although thermodynamically similar to the old Ecoboost 1.0, the new engine features cylinder deactivation under low-load conditions. A new dual-mass flywheel and a vibration-damping clutch disc (in manual-transmission vehicles) help neutralise engine oscillations when running on two cylinders. Production started in 2018.

In 2019, Ford launched an mHEV version of the 1.0 EcoBoost engine first fitted to the Puma SUV, which uses a belt-driven integrated starter/generator-motor (BiSG); which is in essence a starter motor, alternator, and propulsion motor in one. Fundamentally, the engine is identical to the 2018–present 1.0 EcoBoost, but features the electric starter/generator and its battery system. The motor itself is not used to propel the vehicle on its own, and is mainly used to increase efficiency by reducing engine load, provide extra power during acceleration, and to reduce the perceived ‘turbo-lag’ at certain engine speeds while accelerating. The starter/generator makes use of a 48-volt battery system in the car, although vehicles fitted with these engines are not plug-in hybrids or full hybrids. Further developments introduced include a more comprehensive ‘start-stop’ functionality, which was previously available but did not cut the engine off until the vehicle was completely stopped. The new engines can turn off while the car decelerates, at a maximum speed of about 15 mph. The new, electrified engines are available in either 125 hp (93 kW; 127 PS) or 154 hp (115 kW; 156 PS) outputs.

==== Engine issues ====
The 1.0L Fox wet timing belt can degrade prematurely. This causes the engine to lose oil pressure or timing which causes severe engine damage. The belt needs to be replaced according to the manufacturers recommended interval or earlier under harsh conditions. The cost is higher than a dry timing belt due to the greater labour needed.

In 2024, Ford announced that the 2016-2018 Focus and 2017-2021 EcoSport models would be recalled due to unreliable oil pump drive belt tensioner arms and/or wet belt degradation. Prior to this recall, 2,099 warranty claims were reportedly filed due to this issue.

In December 2025, the NHTSA opened an Investigation into the version of the 1.0L engine used in the 2015-2018 Ford Focus and 2015-2017 Ford Fiesta. This was due to complaints of an oil warning appearing on the dashboard then followed by a loss or reduction in power.

- 84 hp (63 kW; 85 PS) at 6000 rpm, 125 lb⋅ft (170 N⋅m) at 1400-3500 rpm
  - 2018–2019 Ford Focus Mk4
- 99 hp (74 kW; 100 PS) at 4500-6000 rpm, 125 lb⋅ft (170 N⋅m) at 1400-4000 rpm
  - 2012–present Ford Focus Mk3
  - 2012–2019 Ford C-Max
  - 2012–2017 Ford B-Max
  - 2013–2023 Ford Fiesta Mk6
  - 2013–2022 Ford Ecosport
  - 2014–present Ford Transit Courier
- 123 hp (92 kW; 125 PS) at 6000 rpm, 125 lb⋅ft (170 N⋅m) at 1400-4500 rpm
  - 2012–present Ford Focus Mk3
  - 2012–2019 Ford C-Max
  - 2012–2017 Ford B-Max
  - 2013–2023 Ford Fiesta Mk6
  - 2013–2022 Ford EcoSport
  - 2013–2019 Ford Mondeo Mk5
  - 2023–present Ford Tourneo Courier
  - 2024–present Ford Transit Courier
- 123 hp (92 kW; 125 PS) at 6000 rpm, 155 lb⋅ft (210 N⋅m) at 1750 rpm Motor: 11.5 kW (15.4 hp; 15.6 PS), 37 lb⋅ft (50 N⋅m) motor (MHEV)
  - 2019–present Ford Puma
  - 2020–2023 Ford Fiesta Mk7
  - 2020–present Ford Focus Mk4
- 138 hp (103 kW; 140 PS) at 6000 rpm, 133 lb⋅ft (180 N⋅m) at 1500-5000 rpm
  - 2014–2020 Ford Fiesta Mk6
  - 2014–2018 Ford Focus Mk3
- 155 PS (114 kW; 153 hp) at 6000 rpm, 177 lb⋅ft (240 N⋅m) at 2500 rpm, 10:1 compression ratio Motor: 11.5 kW (15.4 hp; 15.6 PS), 37 lb⋅ft (50 N⋅m) motor (MHEV)
  - 2019–present Ford Puma
  - 2020–2023 Ford Fiesta Mk7
  - 2020–present Ford Focus Mk4
- 170 PS (125 kW; 168 hp) at 6000 rpm, 183 lb⋅ft (248 N⋅m) at 3000 rpm, 10:1 compression ratio Motor: 11.5 kW (15.4 hp; 15.6 PS), 37 lb⋅ft (50 N⋅m) motor (MHEV)
  - 2019–present Ford Puma ST

==== Motorsports ====
- Ford Fiesta Rally4
- Ford Fiesta Rally5

=== 1.1 L Duratec Ti-VCT ===
1.1 L Duratec Ti-VCT I-3

Layout
- Configuration: Inline-3
- Displacement: 1,084 cc (66.1 cu in)
- Cylinder bore: 73.0 mm (2.87 in)
- Piston stroke: 86.3 mm (3.40 in)
- Cylinder block material: Cast iron
- Cylinder head material: Cast aluminum
- Valvetrain: 12 valve DOHC
- Valvetrain drive system: Wet belt
- Compression ratio: 12.0:1

Combustion
- Fuel system: Port injection
- Management: Bosch MED17
- Oil system: Fixed displacement oil pump

This is a decontented version of the 1.0L Ecoboost Fox engine intended to provide a more affordable powertrain option. It shares most components with the Fox including the block, oil bathed timing belt, valvetrain, and ECU, but is port injected, lacks cylinder deactivation, and is naturally aspirated; as a result, its compression ratio is raised to 12.0:1. It is built at Ford's Bridgend Engine Plant in the UK.

==== Applications ====
69 hp (51 kW; 70 PS) at 5000-6500 rpm, 81 lb⋅ft (110 N⋅m) at 3500 rpm

- 2017–2023 Ford Fiesta Mk7

84 hp (63 kW; 85 PS) at 6300 rpm, 81 lb⋅ft (110 N⋅m) at 3500 rpm

- 2017–2023 Ford Fiesta Mk7

=== 1.5 L Dragon ===
Dragon 1.5 L Ecoboost I-3

Layout
- Configuration: Inline-3
- Displacement: 1,496 cc (91.3 cu in)
- Cylinder bore: 84.0 mm (3.31 in)
- Piston stroke: 90.0 mm (3.54 in)
- Cylinder block material: Cast aluminum
- Cylinder head material: Cast aluminum
- Valvetrain: 12 valve DOHC roller finger follower
- Compression ratio: 9.7-11.0:1

Combustion
- Turbocharger: Single Continental radial-axial
- Fuel system: Port and direct injection
- Management: Bosch MG1CS016
- Oil system: Two-stage variable displacement oil pump

Chronology
- Predecessor: Ecoboost 1.5 L I4

On 24 February 2017, as part of the unveiling of the seventh generation (Mk8 - UK) derived Fiesta ST, Ford announced an all-new aluminum inline 3-cylinder 1.5 L EcoBoost engine with cylinder deactivation technology. The version of this engine announced for the Fiesta ST produces 200 PS (147 kW; 197 hp) at 6,000 rpm and delivers 290 N⋅m (214 lb⋅ft) of torque from 1,600 to 4,000 rpm.

The engine is based on an expansion of the 1.0 EcoBoost, taking the capacity per cylinder up to 500 cc, which Ford consider is likely to be the maximum for optimum thermal efficiency. The engine is an all-aluminum design with integrated exhaust manifold, low inertia mixed flow turbocharger and combines both port fuel injection and direct fuel injection.

The engine is equipped with cylinder deactivation technology, implemented by stopping fuel delivery and valve operation for one of the engine's cylinders in conditions where full capacity is not needed.

==== Applications ====
- 148 hp (110 kW; 150 PS) at 6000 rpm, 177 lb⋅ft (240 N⋅m) at 1600-5000 rpm
  - 2018–present Ford Focus Mk4
  - 2019–present Ford Kuga Mk3
- 180 hp (134 kW; 182 PS) at 6000 rpm, 177 lb⋅ft (240 N⋅m) at 1600-5000 rpm
  - 2018–2023 Ford Focus Mk4
- 180 hp (134 kW; 182 PS) at 6000 rpm, 199 lb⋅ft (270 N⋅m) at 3000 rpm
  - 2023–present Ford Escape
  - 2025–present Ford Bronco Sport
- 181 hp (135 kW; 184 PS) at 6000 rpm, 192 lb⋅ft (260 N⋅m) at 3000 rpm
  - 2020–2022 Ford Escape
  - 2021–2024 Ford Bronco Sport
- 197 hp (147 kW; 200 PS) at 6000 rpm, 214 lb⋅ft (290 N⋅m) at 1600-4000 rpm, 9.7:1 compression ratio
  - 2018–2023 Ford Fiesta Mk7 ST
  - 2021–present Ford Puma ST

==== Motorsports ====
- Ford Fiesta Rally3

== Inline four-cylinder ==
Four versions of EcoBoost I4 engines are in production. A 1.5 L downsized version of the 1.6 L, the 1.6 L which replaces larger-displacement, naturally aspirated I4 engines in Ford vehicles, a 2.0 L which replaces small-displacement, naturally aspirated V6 engines, and a 2.3 L used in high-performance applications. All four engines are turbocharged and direct injected. The production engine family was officially announced at the 2009 Frankfurt Motor Show.

=== 1.5 L ===
A 1.5 L version of the EcoBoost engine family was first unveiled in the 2014 Ford Fusion as a downsized version of the 1.6 L EcoBoost engine. The downsized displacement is a result of Chinese vehicle tax regulations which tax vehicles with engine displacements of 1.5 L or less at lower rates. The 1.5 L EcoBoost adds new technology compared to the 1.6 L on which it is based, including an integrated exhaust manifold and a computer-controlled water pump clutch to decrease warm up time. In the 2015 Fusion, the engine produces 181 hp (135 kW; 184 PS) and 185 lb⋅ft (251 N⋅m).

==== Applications ====
184 PS (135 kW; 181 hp)

- 2014 - 2020 Ford Fusion
- 2015 - 2018 Ford Focus Mk3

181 PS (133 kW; 179 hp)

- 2017–2019 Ford Escape

162 PS (119 kW; 160 hp)

- 2017–2019 Landwind X7

160 PS (118 kW; 158 hp)

- 2015 - 2022 Ford Mondeo Mk5

150 PS (110 kW; 148 hp)

- 2015 - 2018 Ford Focus Mk4
- 2015 - 2019 Ford C-Max

190 PS (140 kW; 187 hp)

- 2023 - present Ford Mondeo Mk5

=== 1.6 L ===
1.6 L Ecoboost I-4

Layout
- Configuration: Inline-4
- Displacement: 1,596 cc (97.4 cu in)
- Cylinder bore: 79.0 mm (3.11 in)
- Piston stroke: 81.4 mm (3.20 in)
- Cylinder block material: Cast aluminum
- Cylinder head material: Cast aluminum
- Valvetrain: 16 valve DOHC direct acting mechanical bucket
- Valvetrain drive system: Belt
- Compression ratio: 10.0-10.1:1

Combustion
- Turbocharger: Borg Warner KP39 low-inertia turbo
- Fuel system: Direct injection
- Management: Bosch MED17
- Oil system: Variable displacement oil pump

Emissions
- Emissions target standard: Euro Stage 5

Chronology
- Successor: Ecoboost 1.5 L I4

The 1.6-litre version was first unveiled in the 2009 Lincoln C concept. The engine is rated at 197 hp (147 kW; 200 PS) and 207 lb⋅ft (280.7 N⋅m). This was also installed in many Volvos during the years of Ford's ownership of that company; Volvo badged the engine B4164T# (with # being different number for different iterations).

The European market version of the 1.6 L provides 150 hp (112 kW; 152 PS), although a 160 hp (119 kW; 162 PS) version is used in the Ford Mondeo.

The 1.6 L EcoBoost engine is raced in the British Formula Ford Championship. The units have replaced the original N/A 1.6 L Duratec units, which in turn replaced the 1.8 L Zetec-engined cars. The engine has also been used for the past few seasons in the WRC in the Ford Fiesta.

The 1.6 L EcoBoost engine is also produced at the Ford Bridgend Engine Plant in Bridgend, Wales.

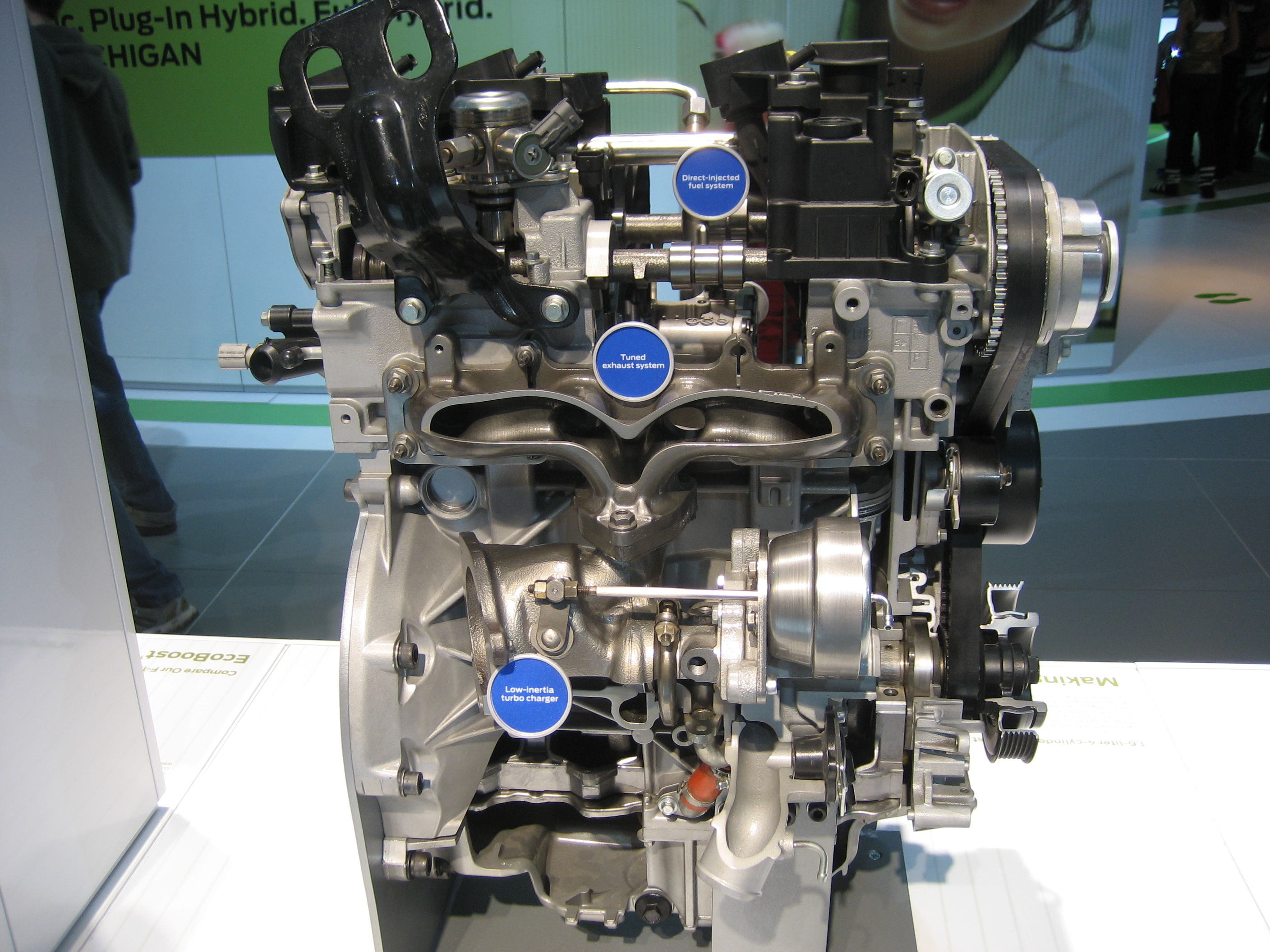

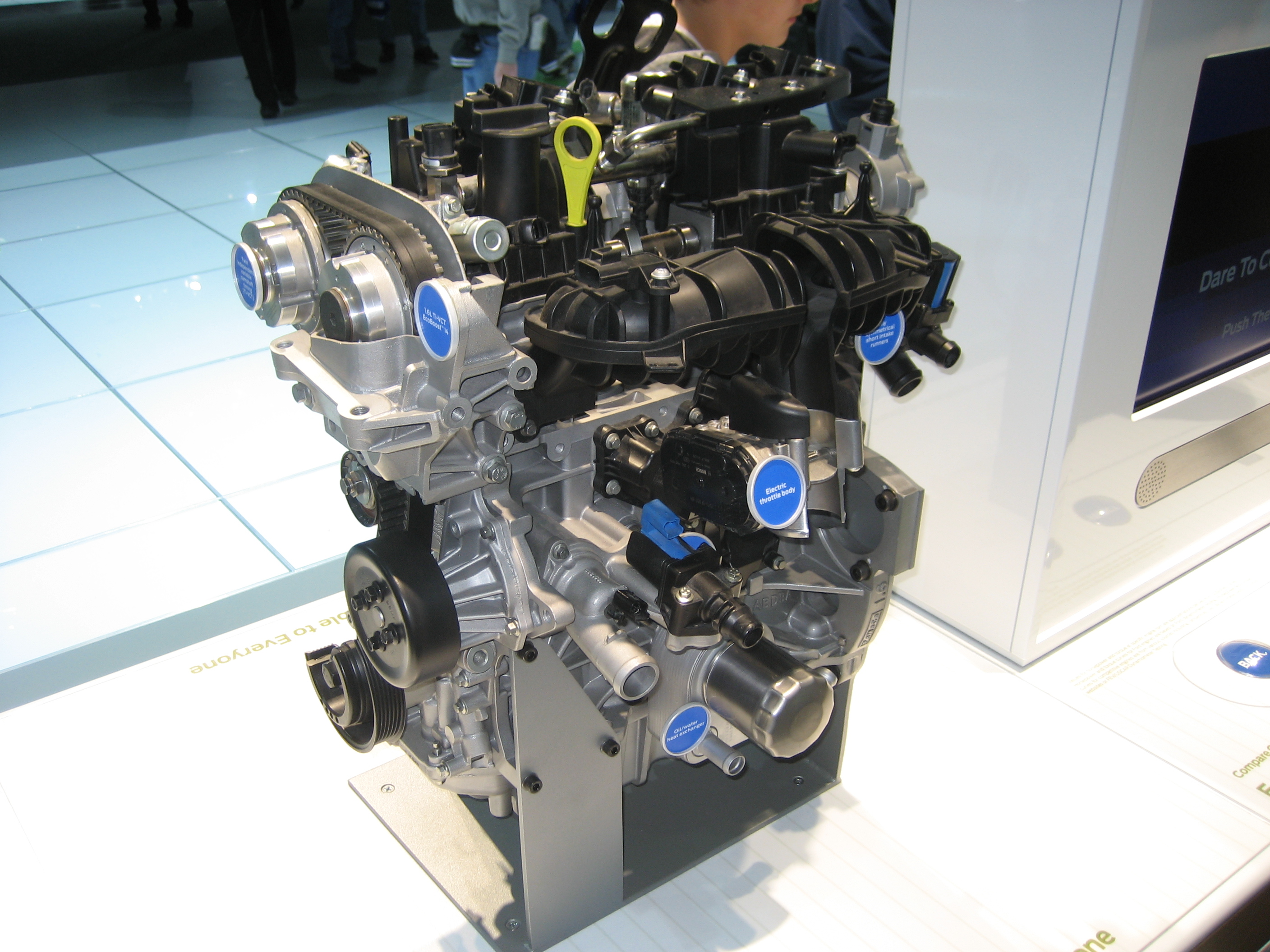

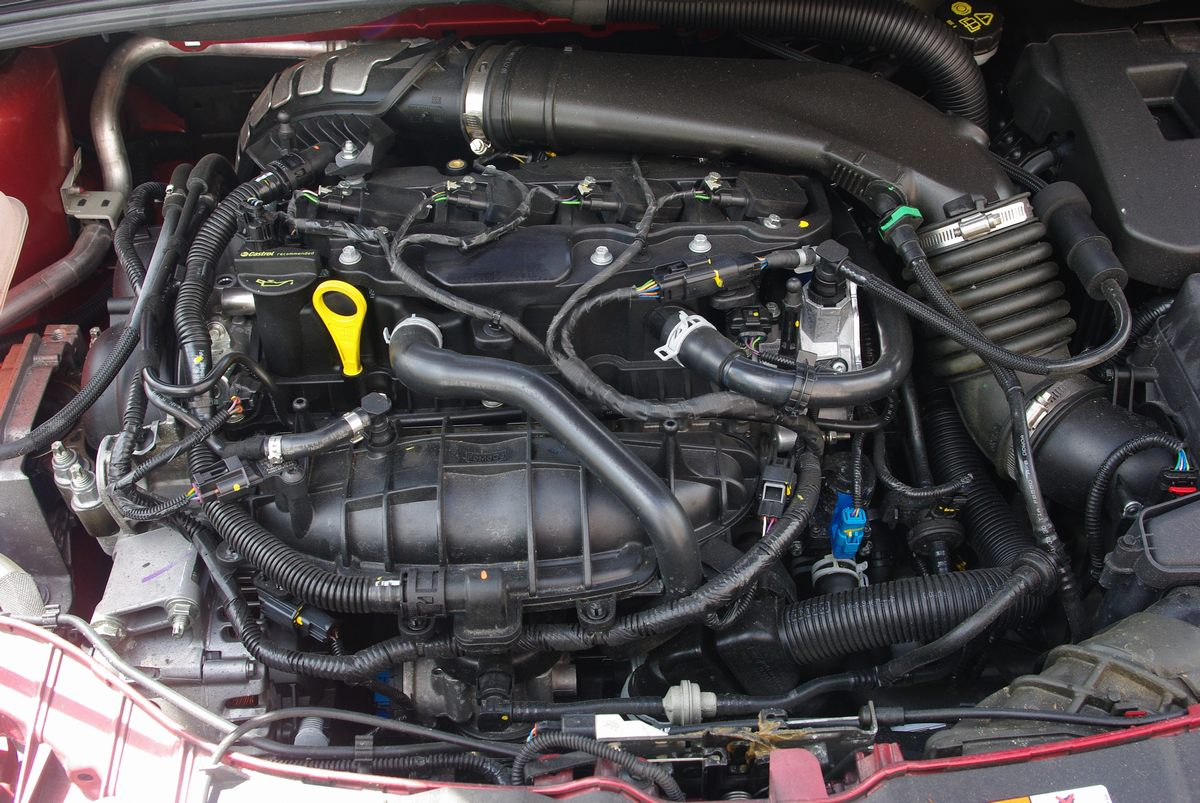

==== Safety and recalls ====
In 2013, Ford has recalled certain Ford Escapes equipped with this engine due to the potential for them to catch fire after overheating.

In 2017, Ford recalled over 360,000 Ford Escape, Ford Fiesta ST, Ford Fusion, Ford Transit Connect, Ford Focus and C-Max hybrid with 1.6 ecoboost engines because of a risk of engine fires caused by a "lack of coolant circulation". There were 29 fires in the U.S. and Canada reported to Ford. The recall partly contributed to a charge of US$300 million by Ford.

==== Specifications ====
Type-turbocharged, direct gasoline-injected inline four-cylinder engine with twin independent variable-camshaft timing
Displacement-1,596 cc (1.6 L; 97 cu in)

More details
Type

Turbocharged, direct gasoline-injected inline four-cylinder engine with twin independent variable-camshaft timing
Displacement
1,596 cc (1.6 L; 97.4 cu in)
Bore
79.0 mm (3.11 in)
Stroke
81.4 mm (3.20 in)
Compression ratio
10.0:1
Valve gear
DOHC with four valves per cylinder, twin independent variable-cam timing
Cylinder head
Cast aluminium
Cylinder block
Cast aluminium
Camshaft drive
Timing belt with dynamic tensioner
Crankshaft
Cast iron, four counterweights, five main bearings
Engine management
Bosch MED17 with CAN-Bus and individual cylinder knock control
Fuel injection
High-pressure direct fuel injection with six-hole injectors
Emission control
Close-coupled three-way catalyst system with heated oxygen sensors and catalyst monitor sensors after catalyst
Emission level
Euro Stage 5
Turbocharger
Borg Warner KP39 low-inertia turbo
Lubrication system
Pressure-fed lubrication system with variable-displacement pump and full-flow oil filter
System capacity with filter
4.1 L (4.3 US qt)

==== Applications ====
120 PS (88 kW; 118 hp)

- 2012–2015 Volvo V40

150 PS (110 kW; 148 hp)

- 2010–2019 Ford C-MAX
- 2010–2014 Ford Focus Mk3
- 2014–2016 Ford Transit Connect
- 2011–2018 Volvo S60
- 2011–2015 Volvo V60
- 2012–2015 Volvo V40

160 PS (118 kW; 158 hp)

- 2011–2014 Ford Mondeo
- 2011–2015 Ford S-Max
- 2011–2015 Ford Galaxy

180 PS (132 kW; 178 hp)

- 2010–2014 Ford Focus
- 2013–2016 Ford Escape
- 2010–2018 Volvo S60 DRIVe FFV (Thailand)

185 PS (136 kW; 182 hp)

- 2010–2019 Ford C-MAX
- 2010–2018 Volvo S60
- 2011–2015 Volvo V60
- 2011–2014 Ford Focus
- 2011–2016 Volvo V70
- 2011–2016 Volvo S80
- 2012–2015 Volvo V40
- 2013–2014 Ford Fusion
- 2013–2017 Ford Fiesta ST

200 PS (147 kW; 197 hp)

- 2016–2017 Ford Fiesta ST200

==== Motorsports ====
- Ford Fiesta R5
- Ford Fiesta Rally2
- Ford Fiesta RS WRC
- Ford Fiesta WRC
- Ford Puma Rally1

=== 2.0 L (2010–2018) ===
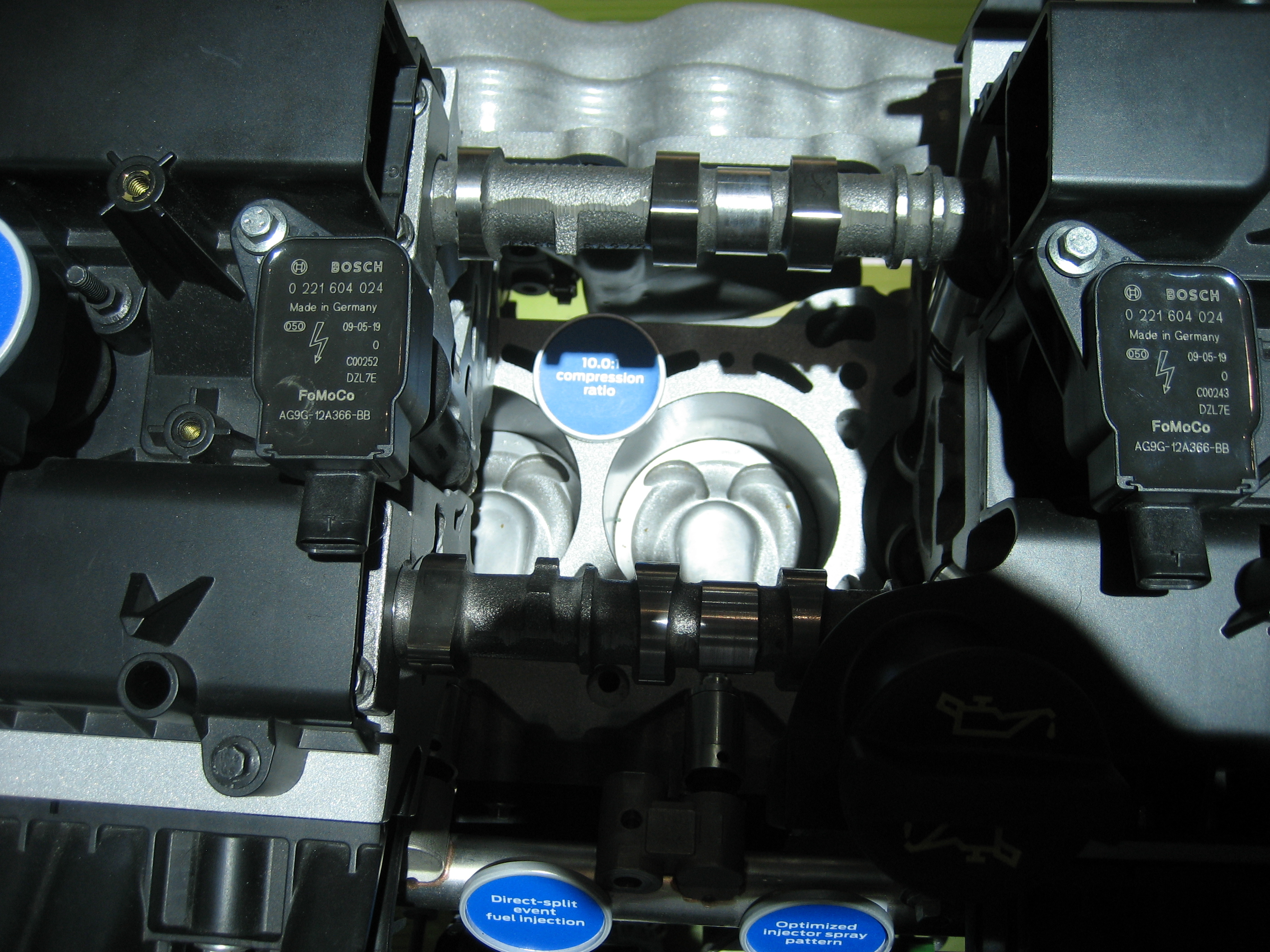
2.0L EcoBoost demo engine at the 2011 NAIAS

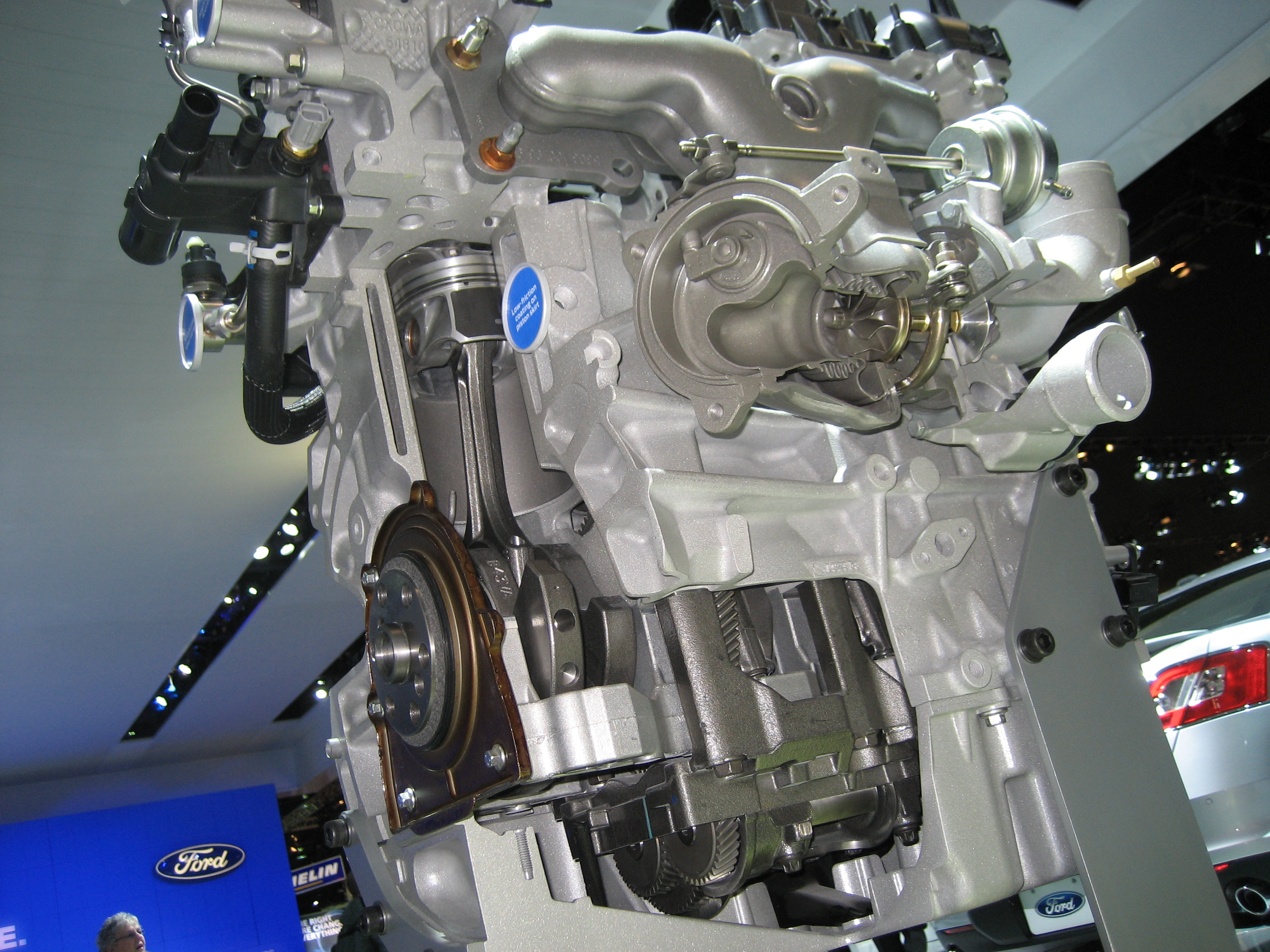
2.0L EcoBoost demo engine at the 2011 NAIAS. Note the exhaust manifold, not present on production North American engines

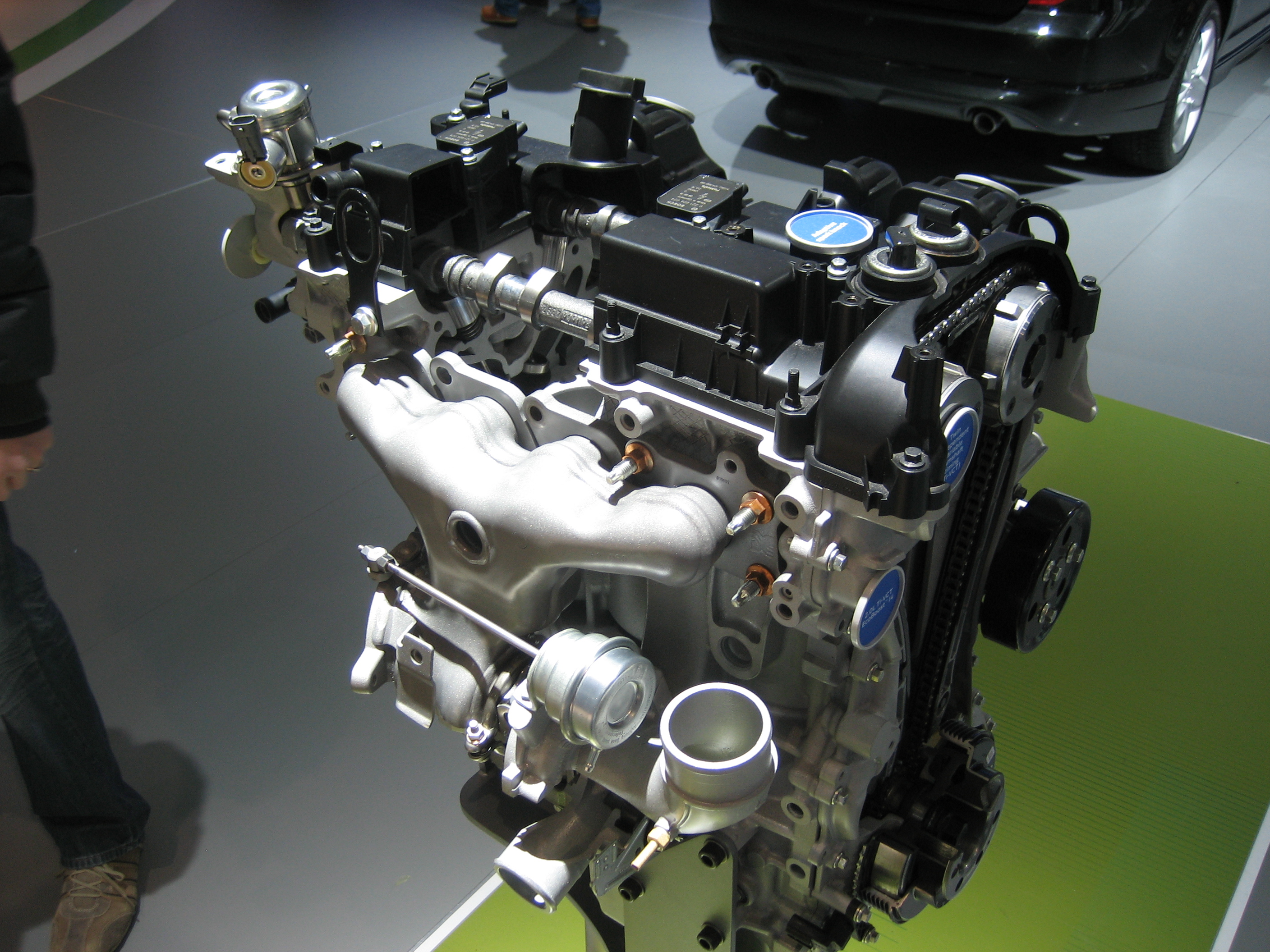
Another angle of the 2011 NAIAS demo engine, again showing the Euro-spec exhaust manifold

A 2.0 L version was first seen in the 2008 Ford Explorer America concept. The engine was rated at 275 hp (205 kW; 279 PS) and 280 lb⋅ft (380 N⋅m).

It is the first EcoBoost engine to include twin independent variable cam timing (Ti-VCT), with advertised 10–20% better fuel economy while maintaining the performance of 3.0 L V6s.

This engine is derived from the 2.0 L Mazda L engine block used by Ford in the North American Focus MK3, but equipped with unique heads, fuel injection system, and Ford's Ti-VCT. It should not be confused with the Mazda 2.3 DISI Turbo, which also features direct injection along with turbocharging, but shares little else aside from the same engine block.

The 2.0 L EcoBoost engine used in North American vehicles is now produced at the Cleveland Engine Plant in Brook Park, Ohio.

==== Specifications ====
Type- turbocharged, direct gasoline-injected inline four-cylinder engine with Ti-VCT
Displacement-1,999 cc (2 L; 122 cu in)

More details
Type

Turbocharged, direct gasoline-injected inline four-cylinder engine with Ti-VCT
Displacement
1,999 cc (2 L; 122 cu in)
Bore
87.5 mm (3.4 in)
Stroke
83.1 mm (3.3 in)
Compression ratio
9.3:1
Valve gear
DOHC with four valves per cylinder, Ti-VCT
Cylinder head
DOHC Gravity die-cast aluminum alloy with sintered valve guides and seats
Cylinder block
High-pressure die-cast aluminum alloy with bed plate
Camshaft drive
Single chain
Crankshaft
Cast iron with 47 mm diameter crankpins, eight counterweights, five 52 mm diameter main bearings and damped front pulley
Engine management
Bosch MED17 with CAN-Bus and individual knock control
Fuel injection
High-pressure fuel direct injection with 7-hole injectors
Emission control
Close-coupled three-way catalyst system with heated oxygen sensors and catalyst monitor sensors after catalyst
Emission level
Euro Stage 5
Turbocharger
Borg Warner K03 low-inertia integrated turbo system
Lubrication system
Wet-Sump
System capacity with filter
5.7Qt

==== Applications ====
Although not listed, some 2.0 EcoBoost engines have a different block design including alternate weaker deck design and cooling ports missing. When installed in Volvos, these engines are called B4204T6 and T7.

It should also be noted that North American-spec and European-spec engines have different cylinder heads: North American market vehicles use a cylinder head with an integrated exhaust manifold, while European-spec vehicles use a cylinder head with individual exhaust ports and a conventional exhaust manifold.

- 203 PS (149 kW; 200 hp) at 5500 rpm, 221 lb⋅ft (300 N⋅m) at 1750-4500 rpm
  - 2010–2014 Ford S-MAX
  - 2010–2015 Ford Galaxy
  - 2010–2019 Ford Mondeo
  - 2010–2018 Volvo S60 2.0T
  - 2010–2011 Volvo V60 2.0T
  - 2010–2011 Volvo V70 2.0T
- 243 PS (179 kW; 240 hp) at 5500 rpm, 270 lb⋅ft (366 N⋅m) at 1900–3500 rpm (Note: Torque figures are not uniform for all of the following vehicles)
  - 2010–2019 Ford Mondeo
  - 2010–2018 Volvo S60 T5
  - 2010–2013 Volvo V60 T5
  - 2011–2013 Volvo V70
  - 2012–2017 Volvo XC60 T5
  - 2011–2015 Ford Explorer
  - 2011–2014 Ford Edge
  - 2011– 2017 Range Rover Evoque
  - 2012–2018 Ford S-MAX
  - 2015–2021 Ford Galaxy
  - 2012–2016 Ford Falcon
  - 2013–2015 Ford Escape / Ford Kuga
  - 2013–2015 Land Rover Freelander 2
  - 2013–2016 Ford Fusion
  - 2013–2017 Ford Taurus
  - 2013–2015 Lincoln MKZ
  - 2015–2017 Land Rover Discovery Sport
  - 2015-2017 Jaguar XE 25T
  - 2015–2018 Lincoln MKC
- 255 PS (188 kW; 252 hp) at 5500 rpm, 270 lb⋅ft (366 N⋅m) at 2000–4500 rpm
  - 2012–2018 Ford Focus ST
- 290 PS (213 kW; 286 hp) at 5500 rpm, 310 lb⋅ft (420 N⋅m) at 1900–3500
  - 2008–2017 VUHL 05
- 305 PS (224 kW; 301 hp) at 5500 rpm, 270 lb⋅ft (366 N·m) at 2500 rpm, Ford-RPE (Radical Performance Engines)
  - 2011– Radical SR3 SL

=== 2.0 L "Twin-Scroll" (2015–) ===
A redesigned 2.0 L EcoBoost four-cylinder was introduced with the second-generation Ford Edge, followed by the 2017 Ford Escape in spring 2016. It is built in Cleveland, Ohio and Valencia, Spain. It features a higher compression ratio than its predecessor (10.1:1 vs 9.3:1), with the exception of the Maverick, along with a twin-scroll turbocharger and fuel and oil systems upgrades, as well as a redesigned block and cylinder head, though the engine still retains some of its L block heritage (such as the bore spacing and the non-keyed crankshaft sprocket). This new engine will deliver more low-end torque than its predecessor. It is expected to tow 3,500 lb (1,600 kg) in the redesigned Edge and 2017+ Escape and up to 4,000 lb (1,800 kg) in the Ford Maverick when properly equipped. This generation of the 2.0 L EcoBoost uses direct fuel injection only.

For the 2020 model year, the engine block was updated to use drilled cylinder coolant passages instead of a slit between the cylinders. This largely corrected remaining coolant intrusion issues for the engine.

==== Applications ====
- Approx. 245 hp (183 kW; 248 PS), 275 lb⋅ft (373 N⋅m)
  - 2015–2018 Ford Edge
  - 2015–2021 Ford Everest
  - 2015–2016 Zenos E10 S
  - 2016– Ford Tourneo
  - 2016–2021 Ford Escape / Ford Kuga
  - 2017–2020 Ford Fusion
  - 2022–present Ford Mondeo
  - 2021–2025 Ford Bronco Sport
  - 2016–2020 Lincoln MKZ
  - 2022–present Lincoln Zephyr
  - 2019–2020 Lincoln MKC
- 250 hp (186 kW; 253 PS), 280 lb⋅ft (380 N⋅m)
  - 2019–2024 Ford Edge L
  - 2019–2023 Lincoln Nautilus
  - 2020–2023 Lincoln Corsair
  - 2024-present Oshkosh Next Generation Delivery Vehicle (NGDV) for United States Postal Service (USPS)
- 250 hp (186 kW; 253 PS) at 5500 rpm, 277 lb⋅ft (376 N⋅m) at 3000 rpm
  - 2022–2024 Ford Maverick

==== Motorsport ====
- 2019–present Ford Fiesta Rally2 (Detuned to 1600cc and developed by M-Sport)

CAF484WQ**

Overview
- Manufacturer: Changan Ford
- Designer: Ford
- Production: 2022-

Layout
- Configuration: Inline-4
- Displacement: 1,995 cc (121.7 cu in)
- Cylinder bore: 84 mm (3.307 in)
- Piston stroke: 90 mm (3.543 in)
- Valvetrain drive system: Chain
- Compression ratio: 9.5:1 / 10.8:1

Combustion
- Turbocharger: Twin-scroll
- Fuel system: Dual injection (combine both port injection and direct injection)
- Fuel type: Gas

Output
- Power output: 185 Kw - 214 Kw
- Torque output: 390 Nm - 407 Nm

Emissions
- Emissions target standard: China 6
- Emissions control systems: EGR, catalytic converter, GPF

Chronology
- Predecessor: CAF488WQ*

=== 2.0 L EcoBoost Engine (2022–present) ===
The redesigned 2.0L EcoBoost turbocharged engine introduced in 2022 featured an adjustment to its bore and stroke ratio, changing it from the previous 87.5mm * 83.1mm to 84mm * 90mm. Additionally, the engine incorporated both port injection and direct injection technologies. The engine of gasoline-powered vehicles and the engine of hybrid vehicles have different compression ratios. The compression ratio of the gasoline engine is 10.8:1, while that of the hybrid engine is 9.5:1.

==== Applications in USA & China ====
- 248 hp (185 kW; 251 PS) at 5000 rpm, 287.65 lb⋅ft (390 N⋅m) at 2000-4000 rpm
  - 2024–present Ford Mondeo
  - 2023–present Ford Edge L
- 255 hp (190 kW; 259 PS) at 5000 rpm, 287.65 lb⋅ft (390 N⋅m) at 2000-4000 rpm
  - 2023–present Lincoln Corsair
  - 2024–present Lincoln Z
  - 2023–present Lincoln Nautilus
- 270 hp (201 kW; 274 PS), 295 lb⋅ft (400 N⋅m) (FHEV)
  - 2023–present Ford Edge L
- 277 hp (207 kW; 281 PS), 300 lb⋅ft (407 N⋅m) (FHEV)
  - 2023–present Lincoln Nautilus
- 282 hp (210 kW; 286 PS), 300 lb⋅ft (407 N⋅m) (FHEV)
  - 2024–present Ford Mondeo Sport
- 287 hp (214 kW; 291 PS), 300 lb⋅ft (407 N⋅m) (FHEV)
  - 2024–present Lincoln Z
  - 2025–present Bronco Sport

=== 2.3 L ===
2.3 L Ecoboost I-4

Layout
- Configuration: Inline-4
- Displacement: 2,261 cc (138.0 cu in)
- Cylinder bore: 87.5 mm (3.44 in)
- Piston stroke: 94.0 mm (3.7 in)
- Cylinder block material: high pressure cast aluminum
- Cylinder head material: High pressure cast aluminum
- Valvetrain: 16-valve DOHC direct acting mechanical bucket
- Compression ratio: 9.37-10.0:1

Combustion
- Turbocharger: Single-scroll
- Fuel system: Direct injection

The 2.3L version of the EcoBoost engine, a derivative of the Mazda L3, debuted in the 2015 Ford Mustang and also the Lincoln MKC crossover and has been implemented in many Ford and Lincoln vehicles with various outputs.

The 2.3 L EcoBoost engine is produced with the 2.0 L EcoBoost at the Valencia Engine Plant in Valencia, Spain. In March 2015 Ford announced the official production start of the all-new twin-scroll 2.0-liter and 2.3-liter EcoBoost engines for North America at its Cleveland Engine Plant in Ohio.

==== Applications ====
- 270 hp (201 kW; 274 PS) at 5500 rpm, 310 lb⋅ft (420 N⋅m) at 3000 rpm
  - 2019–present Ford Ranger
  - 2020–present Ford Everest
- 276 hp (206 kW; 280 PS) at 5500 rpm, 310 lb⋅ft (420 N⋅m) at 3000–4000 rpm
  - 2019–2025 Ford Focus ST
- 280 hp (209 kW; 284 PS) at 5600 rpm, 310 lb⋅ft (420 N⋅m) at 3000 rpm
  - 2016–2019 Ford Explorer
- 285–295 hp (213–220 kW; 289–299 PS) at 5500 rpm, 305–310 lb⋅ft (414–420 N⋅m) at 2750 rpm
  - 2015–2019 Lincoln MKC
  - 2020–2025 Lincoln Corsair
- 300 hp (224 kW; 304 PS) at 5500 rpm, 310 lb⋅ft (420 N⋅m) at 3500 rpm
  - 2020–2024 Ford Explorer
- 300 hp (224 kW; 304 PS) at 5700 rpm, 325 lb⋅ft (441 N⋅m) at 3400 rpm
  - 2021–2024 Ford Bronco
- 310 hp (231 kW; 314 PS) at 5500 rpm, 320–350 lb⋅ft (434–475 N⋅m) at 3000 rpm, 9.5:1 compression ratio
  - 2015–2023 Ford Mustang EcoBoost (S550)
- 330 hp (246 kW; 335 PS) at 6000 rpm, 350 lb⋅ft (475 N⋅m) at 3000 rpm, 9.37:1 compression ratio
  - 2020–2023 Ford Mustang EcoBoost Performance Package
- 350 hp (261 kW; 355 PS) at 6000 rpm, 350 lb⋅ft (475 N⋅m) at 3200 rpm
  - 2016–2018 Ford Focus RS
  - 2016–2017 Zenos E10 R
  - 2017–present Elemental RP1
- 325–405 hp (242–302 kW; 330–411 PS) at 6000 rpm, 317–369 lb⋅ft (430–500 N⋅m) at 3200 rpm
  - 2019–present VUHL 05 RR
- 395 hp (295 kW; 400 PS) at 6200 rpm, 369 lb⋅ft (500 N⋅m) at 3000-3500 rpm
  - 2017–present Dallara Stradale
- 493 hp (368 kW; 500 PS), 516 lb⋅ft (700 N⋅m)
  - 2021–present Dallara Stradale EXP

=== 2.3L "MPC" ===
MPC 2.3 L Ecoboost I-4

Layout
- Configuration: Inline-4
- Displacement: 2,261 cc (138.0 cu in)
- Cylinder bore: 84 mm (3.31 in)
- Piston stroke: 102 mm (4.02 in)
- Cylinder block material: high pressure cast aluminum
- Cylinder head material: High pressure cast aluminum
- Valvetrain: 16 valve DOHC roller finger follower
- Compression ratio: 10.634:1

Combustion
- Turbocharger: Twin-scroll
- Fuel system: Port and direct injection

Chronology
- Predecessor: Ecoboost 2.3 L I4

An updated version of the 2.3L engine debuted in the 2024 Ford Mustang. It has different cylinder dimensions to the previous version, with bore decreased to 84 mm (3.31 in) and the stroke increased to 102 mm (4.02 in), which comes out to nearly the exact same displacement of 2.3 L (2,261 cc; 138 cu in). The compression ratio is increased to 10.634:1. Valve diameter and lift are increased, with intake and exhaust valve diameters of 34 mm (1.3 in) and 28.9 mm (1.14 in) respectively, and both valve types lifting up to 9 mm (0.35 in). It now features the Modular Power Cylinder (MPC) architecture, which involves upgrades such as port injection alongside the existing direct injection, a smaller twin-scroll turbocharger with an electronic wastegate, internal exhaust gas recirculation piping, and an integrated airbox in longitudinal applications. It is built at Ford's Cleveland Engine Plant in Ohio.

==== Applications ====
- 270 hp (201 kW; 274 PS)
  - 2025–present Ford Ranger
- 300 hp (224 kW; 304 PS) at 5500 rpm, 310 lb⋅ft (420 N⋅m) at 3500 rpm
  - 2025–present Ford Explorer
- 300 hp (224 kW; 304 PS) at 5700 rpm, 325 lb⋅ft (441 N⋅m) at 3400 rpm
  - 2025–present Ford Bronco
- 315 hp (235 kW; 319 PS) at 5500 rpm, 350 lb⋅ft (475 N⋅m) at 3000 rpm
  - 2024–present Ford Mustang EcoBoost (S650)

== V6 ==
=== 2.7 L Nano (first generation) ===
Introduced with the 2015 Ford F-150 is a twin-turbo 2.7 L V6 EcoBoost engine. It delivers about 325 hp (242 kW) and 375 lb⋅ft (508 N⋅m). The engine is built at the Lima Ford Engine Plant. Ford has invested US$500 million in the Lima plant for the new engine. Ford also states that the new engine will bring 300 jobs to Allen County, Ohio, but transfers from other plants make the actual number hard to pin down. A 335-hp version was an option on the 2017 Lincoln Continental. Being a next-generation design, it uses a two-piece block design. Compacted graphite iron, a material Ford uses in its 6.7 L PowerStroke diesel engine, is used for the upper cylinder section with aluminum used for the lower stiffening section of the block.

While the second generation 2.7L EcoBoost V6 would fully transition to a wet-belt driven oil pump, the first generation also introduced the design as a rolling production change for some applications, as both generations were produced concurrently.

==== Applications ====
- 325 hp (242 kW) at 5750 rpm, 375 lb⋅ft (508 N⋅m) at 3000 rpm
  - 2015–2017 Ford F-150
- 335 hp (250 kW) at 5500 rpm, 380 lb⋅ft (515 N⋅m) at 3000 rpm
  - 2016–2018 Lincoln MKX
  - 2017–2020 Lincoln Continental
- 335 hp (250 kW) at 5500 rpm, 380 lb⋅ft (515 N⋅m) at 3250 rpm
  - 2019–2023 Lincoln Nautilus
- 315 hp (235 kW) at 4750 rpm, 350 lb⋅ft (475 N⋅m) at 2750 rpm
  - 2015–2018 Ford Edge Sport
- 335 hp (250 kW) at 5000 rpm, 380 lb⋅ft (515 N⋅m) at 3000 rpm
  - 2019–2024 Ford Edge ST
- 325 hp (242 kW) at 5500 rpm, 380 lb⋅ft (515 N⋅m) at 3500 rpm
  - 2017–2019 Ford Fusion Sport

=== 2.7 L Nano (second generation) ===
The second generation 2.7L EcoBoost V6 was introduced with the 2018 Ford F-150 and is mated to a 10-speed transmission that debuted the year prior. It produces an additional 25 lb⋅ft (34 N⋅m) of torque over the first generation. The engine uses a compacted-graphite iron (CGI) block, which is both high strength and lightweight.

It boasts a number of changes from the first generation, with many carrying over from the second generation 3.5L EcoBoost engine that arrived a year earlier in the F-150. The most prominent change being the addition of port fuel injection, while keeping the direct injection system. It also has reduced internal friction to improve power and fuel economy, and new exhaust gas recirculation system. The specific output of the engine is now 121 hp/L, versus the 395-hp Ford Coyote 5.0L naturally aspirated V-8 which has a specific output of only 78 hp/L. The peak torque matches the 5.0L V-8, albeit at a lower 2,750 rpm vs. 4,500 rpm for the V-8.

Additional changes include a new lightweight cam to save weight, dual-chain cam drive system that is stronger and reduces parasitic friction loss, a new electrically actuated wastegate that provides more accurate turbo boost control, a high-pressure exhaust gas recirculation system, and a variable-displacement wet belt-driven oil pump that is electronically controlled to modulate oil flow to further reduce parasitic losses.

==== Applications ====
- 325 hp (242 kW) at 5000 rpm, 400 lb⋅ft (542 N⋅m) at 2750 rpm (2018-20), at 3000 rpm (2021-24), at 3500 rpm (2025-26)
  - 2018–2026 Ford F-150
- 330 hp (246 kW) at 5250 rpm and 415 lb⋅ft (563 N⋅m) at 3100 rpm
  - 2021–present Ford Bronco
- 315 hp (235 kW), 400 lb⋅ft (542 N⋅m)
  - 2024–present Ford Ranger
- 335 hp (250 kW), 380 lb⋅ft (515 N⋅m)

=== 3.0 L Nano ===
A 3.0L V6 twin-turbocharged gasoline direct-injection engine, derived from the 2.7 L EcoBoost, was released in 2016 that produces between 325 and 418 horsepower. The 3.0 L replaced the 3.7 L Ti-VCT Cyclone V6 engine in various vehicles, including the MKZ, Continental, Aviator, Ford Explorer and is also found in the 2022 Ford Bronco Raptor. The 3.0-liter version of the engine was created by increasing the 2.7-liter's cylinder bore in the CGI-block from 83.0 millimeters to 85.3, and by lengthening piston stroke by 3.0 millimeters (to 86.0). Like its 2.7L counterpart, it uses a wet-belt driven oil pump. The 3.0 L is currently only equipped with direct injection while the 2.7 L and 3.5 L engines feature port fuel and direct injection fuel systems.

==== Applications ====
- 288 hp (215 kW) at TBU rpm, 491 N⋅m (362 lb⋅ft) at TBU rpm
  - 2022–present Ford Ranger Raptor (EU) – detuned due to Otto Particulate Filter for emissions reasons
- 325 hp (242 kW) at 5500 rpm, 400 lb⋅ft (542 N⋅m) at 2250 rpm
  - 2027–present Ford F-150
- 350 hp (261 kW) at 5500 rpm, 400 lb⋅ft (542 N⋅m) at 2750 rpm (Front-wheel drive only)
  - 2017–2020 Lincoln MKZ
- 400 hp (298 kW) at 5750 rpm, 400 lb⋅ft (542 N⋅m) at 2750 rpm (All-wheel drive only)
  - 2017–2020 Lincoln Continental
  - 2017–2020 Lincoln MKZ
- 365 hp (272 kW) at 5500 rpm, 380 lb⋅ft (515 N⋅m) at 3500 rpm
  - 2020–2021 Ford Explorer King Ranch & Platinum
- 392 hp (292 kW) at 5650 rpm, 430 lb⋅ft (583 N⋅m) at 3500 rpm
  - 2022–present Ford Ranger Raptor (Australia)
- 405 hp (302 kW) at 5650 rpm, 430 lb⋅ft (583 N⋅m) at 3500 rpm
  - 2024–present Ford Ranger Raptor (USA)
- 400 hp (298 kW) at 5500 rpm, 415 lb⋅ft (563 N⋅m) at 3500 rpm
  - 2020–present Ford Explorer ST
  - 2026–present Ford Explorer Tremor
  - 2022–2023 Ford Explorer King Ranch
  - 2022–2025; 2027–present Ford Explorer Platinum
  - 2020–present Ford Police Interceptor Utility
  - 2020–present Lincoln Aviator
- 418 hp (312 kW) at 5650 rpm, 440 lb⋅ft (597 N⋅m) at 3500 rpm
  - 2022–present Ford Bronco Raptor
- 494 hp (368 kW) total, with added electric engines at 5500 rpm, 630 lb⋅ft (854 N⋅m) total, with added electric motors at 3000 rpm
  - 2020–2023 Lincoln Aviator plug-in hybrid

=== 3.5 L (first generation) ===
The first Ford vehicle to feature this engine was the 2007 Lincoln MKR concept vehicle under the name TwinForce. The engine was designed to deliver power and torque output equivalent to a typical 6.0 L or larger-displacement V8 while achieving at least 15% better fuel efficiency and reduced greenhouse emissions. In the MKR, the concept TwinForce engine was rated at 415 hp (309 kW) and 400 lb⋅ft (542 N⋅m) of torque, as well as run on E85 fuel. When the same prototype engine reappeared in the Lincoln MKT concept in 2008 North American International Auto Show, the name was changed to EcoBoost. Official EcoBoost production began on May 19, 2009 at Cleveland Engine Plant No. 1.

The production engines use the Duratec 35 V6 engine block. The fuel charging and delivery systems can attain high fuel pressures up to 14.8 megapascals (2,150 psi), necessary for efficient operation of the direct fuel injection system. The F-series EcoBoost 3.5L V6 uses two BorgWarner K03 turbochargers which can spin up to 170,000 rpm and provide up to 100 kPa (15 psi) of boost. The transverse EcoBoost 3.5L V6 uses two Garrett GT1549L turbochargers and provides up to 76 kPa (11 psi) of boost. The turbos are set up in a twin-turbo configuration. The engine can consume up to 25% more air over the naturally aspirated counterpart. Through the use of direct injection, the engine needs only regular-grade gasoline to run. The EcoBoost V6 was first available as an engine option for 2010 Lincoln MKS, followed by 2010 Ford Flex, 2010 Ford Taurus SHO, and 2010 Lincoln MKT. The fuel-charging and -delivery systems were co-developed with Robert Bosch GmbH.

On transverse applications, the water pump was relocated to behind the timing cover and driven off of the timing chain.

In 2009, Ford modified an experimental 3.5 L V6 EcoBoost engine with both E85 direct injection and gasoline indirect fuel injection, which achieved a brake mean effective pressure of 2.72 MPa (395 psi) (27 bar), which translates to roughly 750 newton-metres (553 lb⋅ft) of torque and 316 horsepower (236 kW) at 3000 rpm (flat torque curve from 1500–3000 rpm).

==== Applications ====
- 310 hp (231 kW) at 5500 rpm, 400 lb⋅ft (542 N⋅m) at 2500 rpm
  - 2015–2019 Ford Transit
- 355 hp (265 kW) at 5700 rpm, 350 lb⋅ft (475 N⋅m) at 3500 rpm
  - 2010–2012 Ford Flex
  - 2010–2012 Lincoln MKS
  - 2010–2012 Lincoln MKT
- 365 hp (272 kW) at 5500 rpm, 350 lb⋅ft (475 N⋅m) at 1500-5000 rpm
  - 2010–2019 Ford Taurus SHO
  - 2013–2019 Police Interceptor Sedan
  - 2013–2016 Lincoln MKS
  - 2013–2019 Lincoln MKT
- 365 hp (272 kW) at 5500 rpm, 350 lb⋅ft (475 N⋅m) at 3500 rpm
  - 2013–2019 Ford Explorer Sport
  - 2016–2019 Ford Explorer Platinum
  - 2013–2019 Ford Flex
  - 2014–2019 Ford Police Interceptor Utility
- 365 hp (272 kW) at 5000 rpm, 420 lb⋅ft (569 N⋅m) at 2500 rpm
  - 2011–2016 Ford F-150
- 365 hp (272 kW) at 5000 rpm, 420 lb⋅ft (569 N⋅m) at 2250 rpm
  - 2015–2017 Ford Expedition/Expedition EL
- 380 hp (283 kW) at 5250 rpm, 460 lb⋅ft (624 N⋅m) at 2750 rpm
  - 2015–2017 Lincoln Navigator/Navigator L
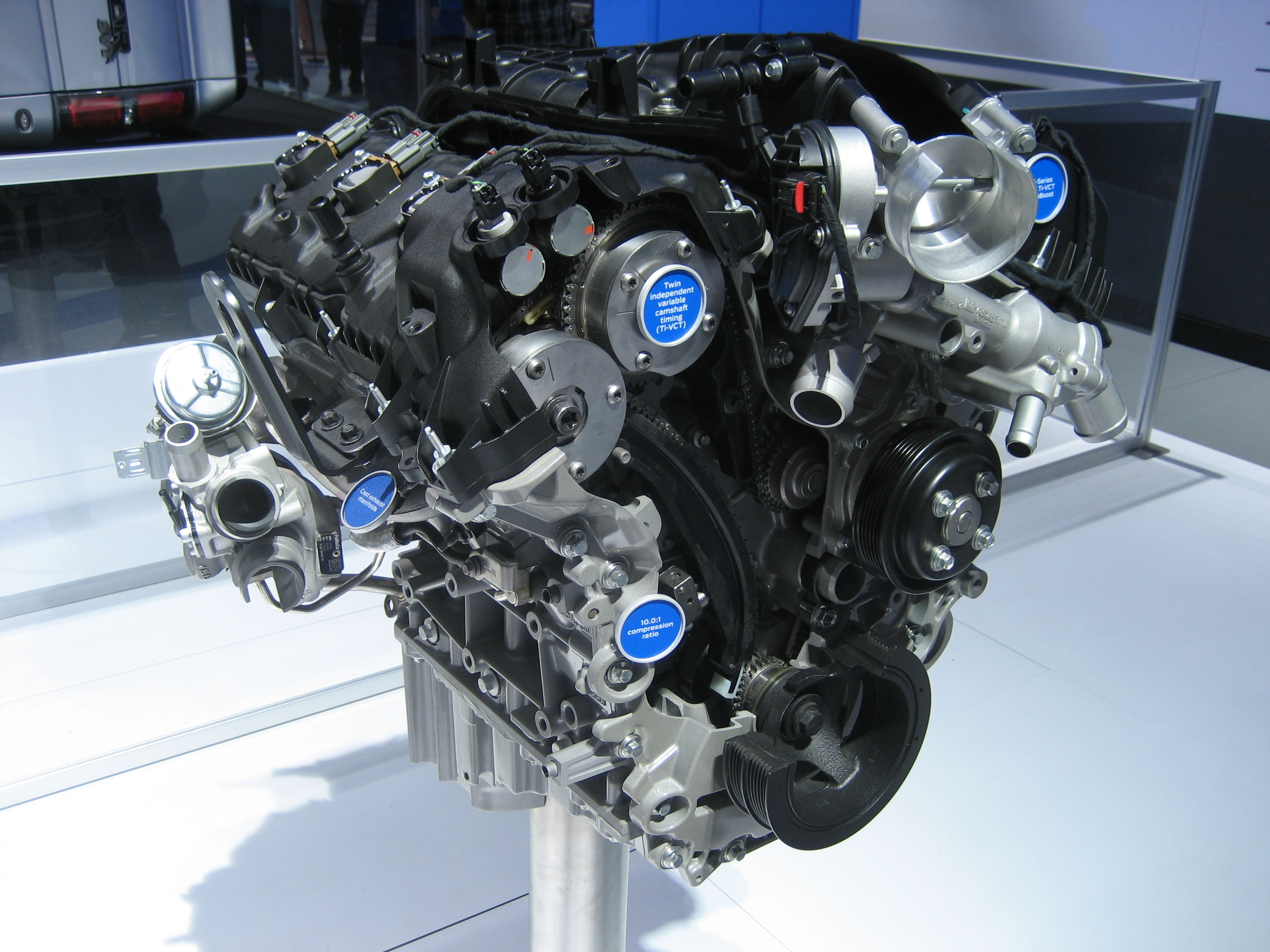

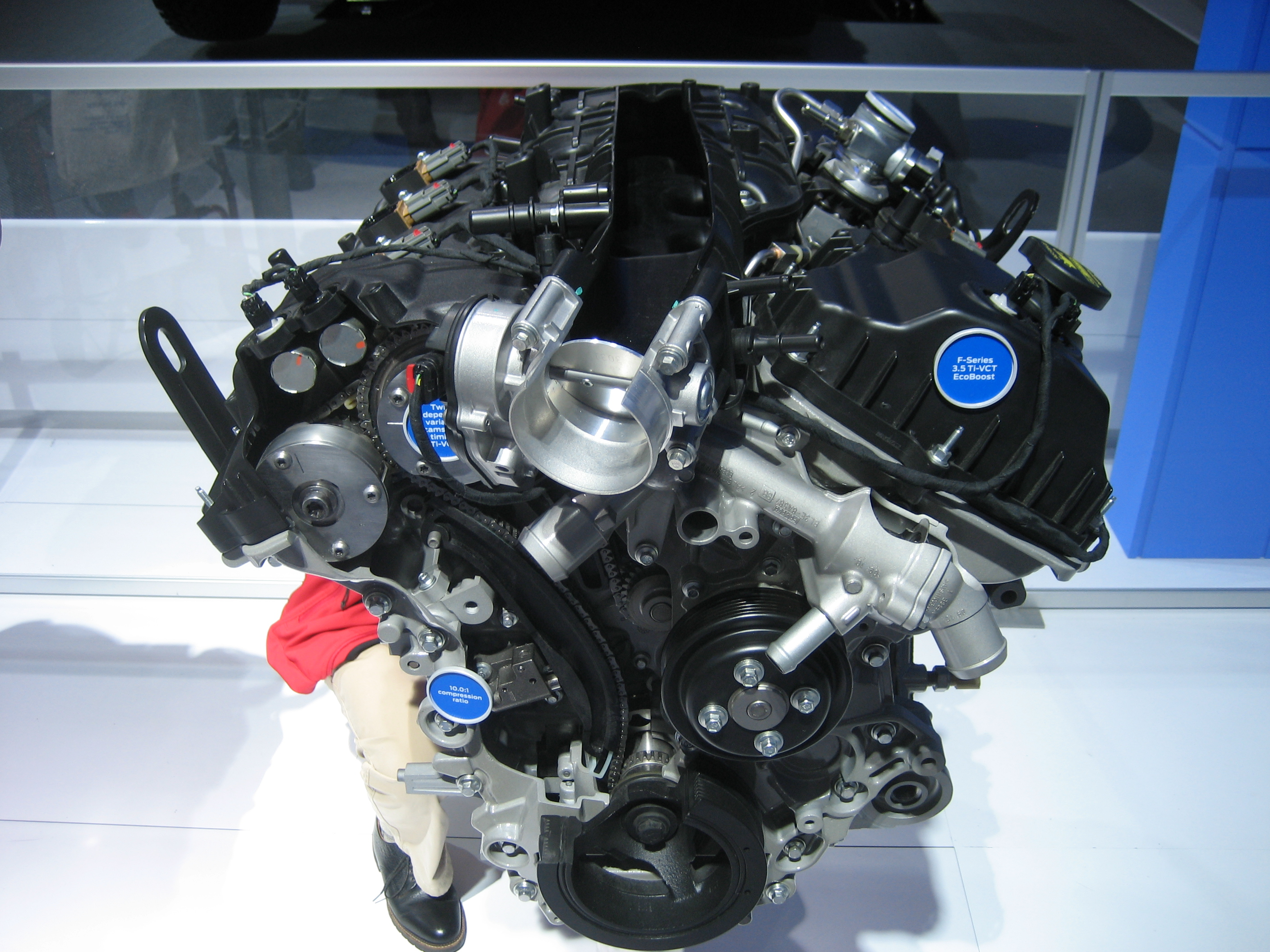

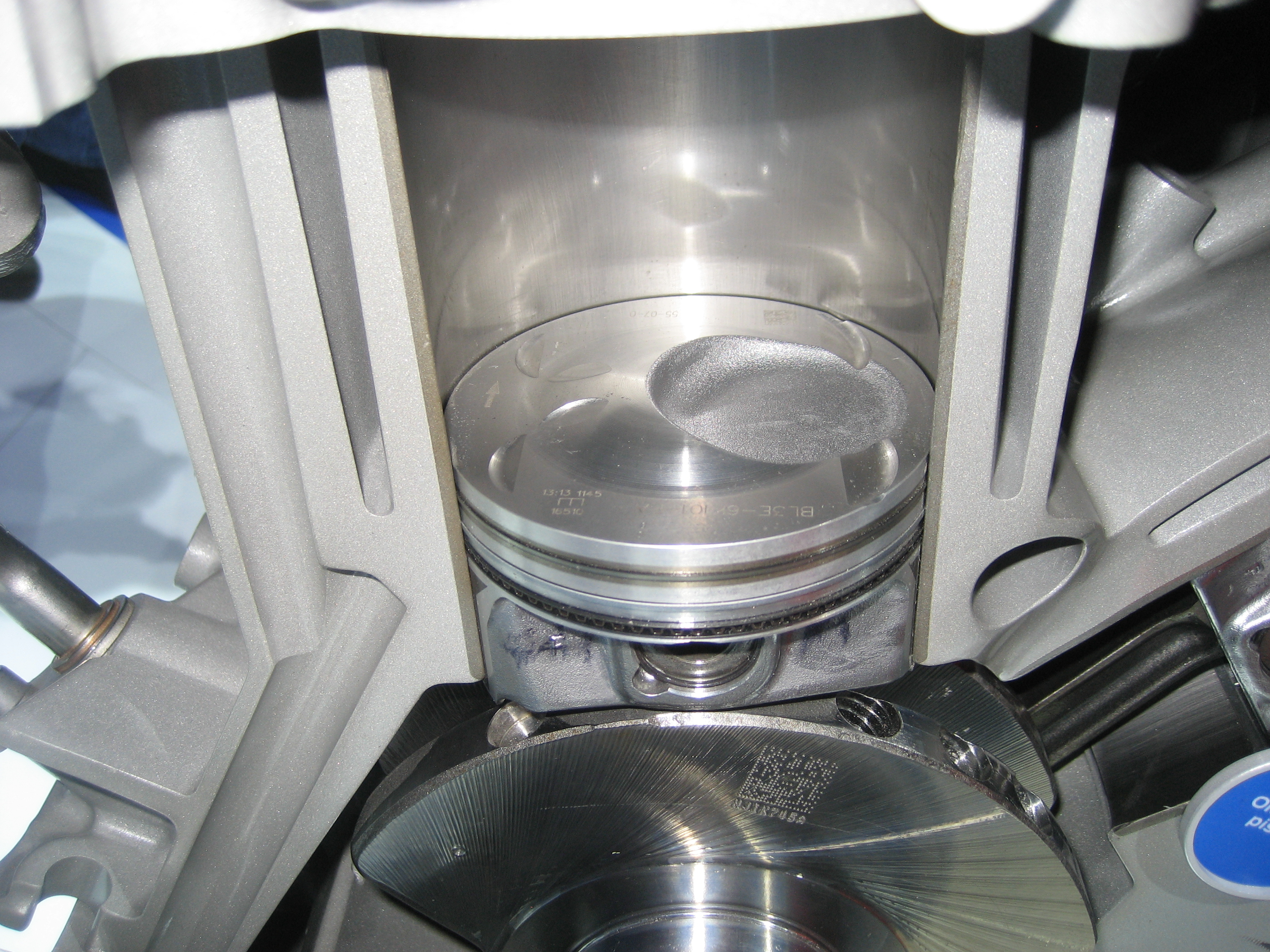

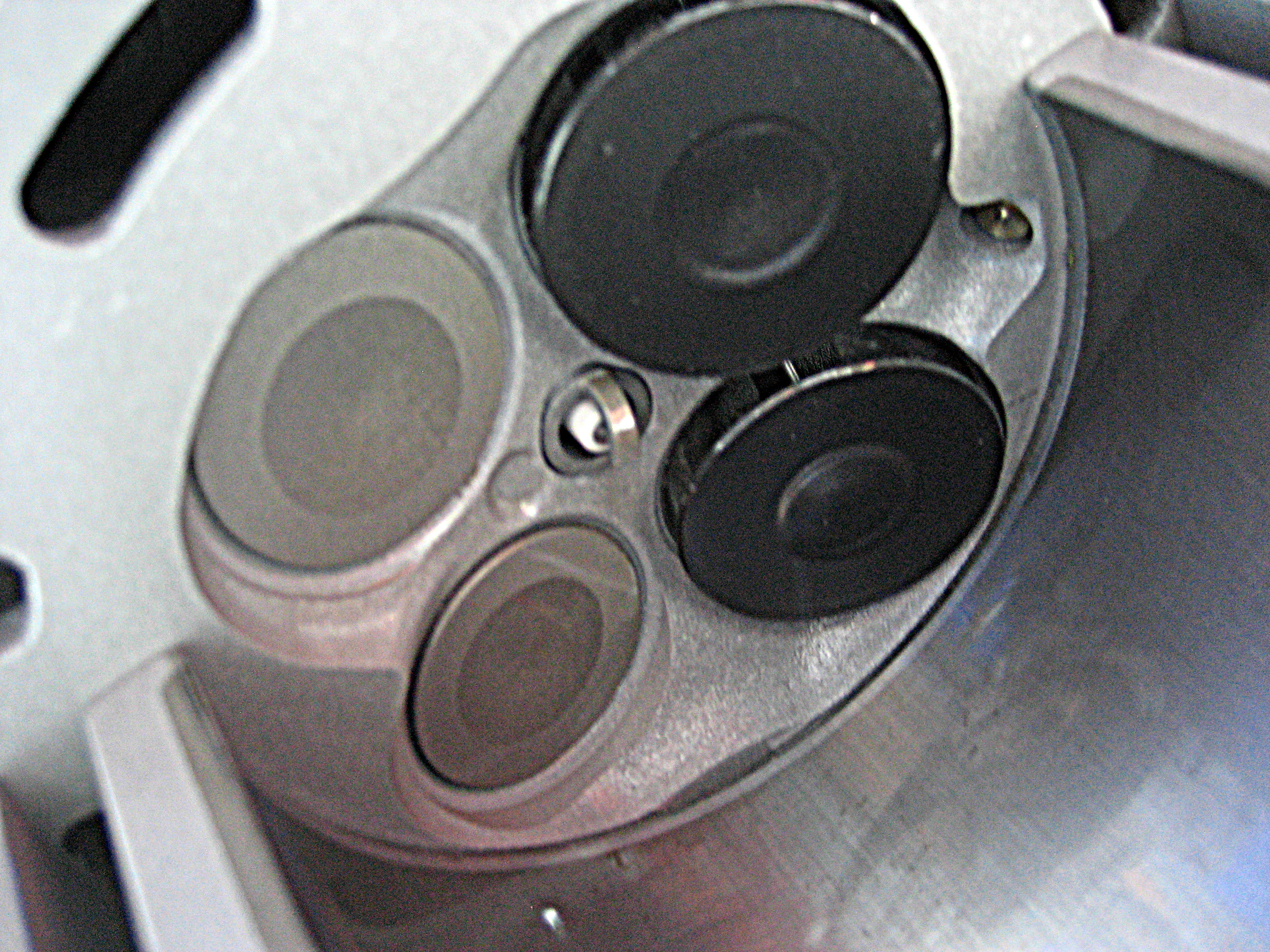

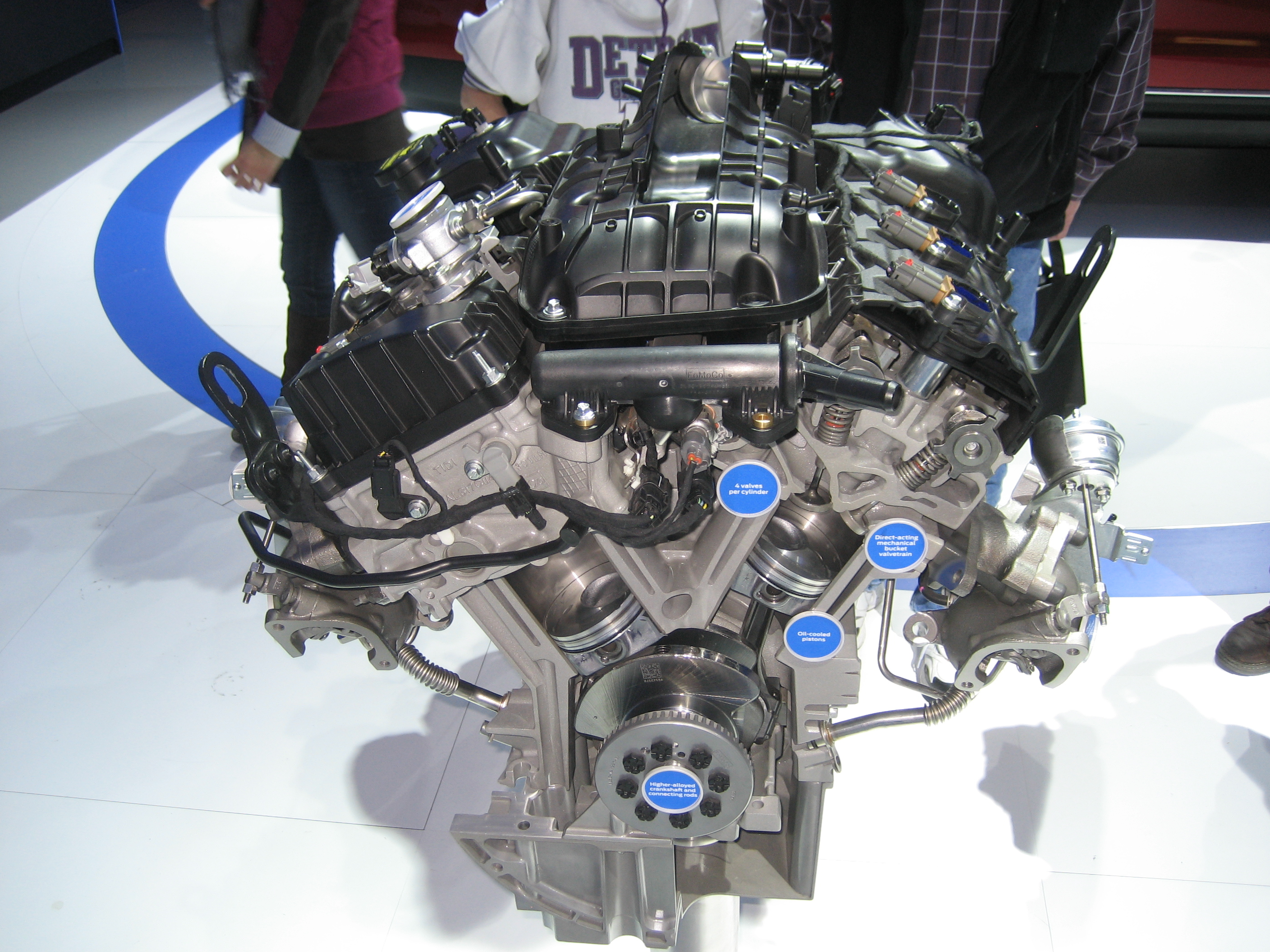

=== 3.5 L (D35; second generation) ===
D35 3.5 L Ecoboost V-6

Layout
- Configuration: 60° V6
- Displacement: 3,497 cc (213 cu in)
- Cylinder bore: 92.51 mm (3.64 in)
- Piston stroke: 86.7 mm (3.41 in)
- Cylinder block material: Cast aluminum
- Cylinder head material: Aluminum alloy
- Valvetrain: 24 valve DOHC roller finger follower
- Valvetrain drive system: Chain
- Compression ratio: 9.0-10.5:1

Combustion
- Turbocharger: Twin turbochargers
- Fuel system: Port and direct injection

Chronology
- Predecessor: Ecoboost 3.5 L V6 (first generation)

The second generation 3.5L EcoBoost V6 (codename D35) was first introduced for the 2017 Ford GT at the 2015 Detroit Auto Show, as well as the 2017 F-150, 2018 Expedition and 2018 Navigator later on.

The most prominent change compared to the first generation is the addition of port fuel injection, while retaining the direct injectors. The port fuel injection was partly added due to the fuel output needs on the 3.5L HO Raptor engine, but also has several other benefits. It will prevent carbon buildup on the intake valves and keep them clean due to fuel passing over the valves. Under certain engine conditions such as low rpm and low loads, the high-pressure fuel pump and direct injection system will deactivate and the engine will only use the port fuel injection, reducing efficiency losses from driving the high pressure fuel pump. Both systems will operate at cold start, which will reduce the increased emissions that direct injection suffers caused by cold cylinder walls and lower fuel atomization.

Changes to the turbochargers include electronically actuated wastegates, turbine wheels that are now made with lighter Mar-M-247 super-alloy which increases responsiveness, and the same diameter 51 mm turbine wheels that now have sharper vane angles allowing between 2.5–16 psi (0.17–1.10 bar) higher boost. The turbochargers continue to be supplied by Borg Warner.

The cam drive system was changed from a single primary chain to a stronger two primary chain system, with separate chains driving each cylinder bank. In addition to the dual primary chains, the side plates on the chains were also thickened. The cam chain drive sprocket on the crankshaft is now a double gear arrangement to drive the two primary chains. These two changes were done to improve the harmonics, and are also stronger to help minimize the chain stretch that can occur over time on the 1st generation 3.5L EcoBoost.

The camshafts were made hollow for weight savings, along with the addition of a roller-finger follower valvetrain. The compression ratio was increased from 10.0:1 to 10.5:1 on lower output versions; higher output versions such as the 3.5L EcoBoost HO in the F-150 Raptor, have lower compression ratios like 10.0:1 and as low as 9.0:1 in the Ford GT.

The camshaft VCT (phaser) design was changed to improve reliability and reduce the development of an engine start-up tapping/rattling noise over time. Ford uses a single piston cooling jet per cylinder, but the oil volume was increased. The underside of the pistons were also redesigned to better transfer heat into the oil.

The engine features auto start/stop, which decreases emissions during city driving by shutting the engine off in extended idling periods.

The engines are 4 lb (1.8 kg) lighter than the previous 3.5L EcoBoost.

==== Variable camshaft timing phaser issues ====
VCT units in Ford and Lincoln vehicles with this engine from the 2020 model year and before are found to be failing around 40-80k miles, requiring a replacement to resolve. Ford has issued multiple service bulletins, with the most recent being Customer Satisfaction Program 21N03 – Supplement #4. This program extends warranty coverage under certain conditions for a VCT replacement due to tapping phasers. The latest VCT part number (ML3Z prefix) is a significant redesign and so far has been durable and not shown the rattling/tapping issue develop.

==== Applications ====
- 310 hp (231 kW) at 5000 rpm, 400 lb⋅ft (542 N⋅m) at 2500 rpm
  - 2020–present Ford Transit
- 375 hp (280 kW) at 5000 rpm, 470 lb⋅ft (637 N⋅m) at 3500 rpm
  - 2017–2020 Ford F-150
- 375 hp (280 kW) at 5000 rpm, 470 lb⋅ft (637 N⋅m) at 2250 rpm
  - 2018–2021 Ford Expedition
- 380 hp (283 kW) at 5000 rpm, 470 lb⋅ft (637 N⋅m) at 2250 rpm
  - 2022–2024 Ford Expedition
- 400 hp (298 kW) at 5000 rpm, 480 lb⋅ft (651 N⋅m) at 3250 rpm
  - 2018–2021 Ford Expedition Platinum
- 400 hp (298 kW) at 5000 rpm, 480 lb⋅ft (651 N⋅m) at 2250 rpm
  - 2022–present Ford Expedition Platinum
- 400 hp (298 kW) at 6000 rpm, 500 lb⋅ft (678 N⋅m) at 3100 rpm
  - 2021–present Ford F-150
- 430 hp (321 kW) at 6000 rpm, 570 lb⋅ft (773 N⋅m) at 3000 rpm (FHEV)
  - 2021–present Ford F-150
- 440 hp (328 kW) at 5000 rpm, 510 lb⋅ft (691 N⋅m) at 3250 rpm, 10.0:1 compression ratio
  - 2022–present Ford Expedition Timberline & Limited Stealth Performance Packages
- 450 hp (336 kW) at 5500 rpm, 510 lb⋅ft (691 N⋅m) at 3000 rpm, 10.0:1 compression ratio
  - 2018–present Lincoln Navigator
- 450 hp (336 kW) at 5000 rpm, 510 lb⋅ft (691 N⋅m) at 3500 rpm, 10.0:1 compression ratio
  - 2017–2020 Ford F-150 High Output
  - 2017–2020 Ford F-150 Raptor
- 450 hp (336 kW) at 5850 rpm, 510 lb⋅ft (691 N⋅m) at 3000 rpm
  - 2021–present Ford F-150 Raptor
- 506 hp (377 kW) at 5200 rpm, 550 lb⋅ft (746 N⋅m) at 4000 rpm
  - 2024– Noble M500
- 647 hp (482 kW) at 6250 rpm, 550 lb⋅ft (746 N⋅m) at 5900 rpm, 9.0:1 compression ratio
  - 2017–2019 Ford GT
- 650 hp (485 kW) at 5500 rpm, 421 lb⋅ft (571 N⋅m) at 2500 rpm
  - 2024- Adamastor Furia
- 660 hp (492 kW) at 6250 rpm, 550 lb⋅ft (746 N⋅m) at 5900 rpm, 9.0:1 compression ratio
  - 2020–2022 Ford GT

==== Motorsports ====
- Ford GT LM GTE-Pro

== See also ==
- Ford Duratec engine
- List of Ford engines
- Ford PowerShift transmission
