= VUHL 05 =

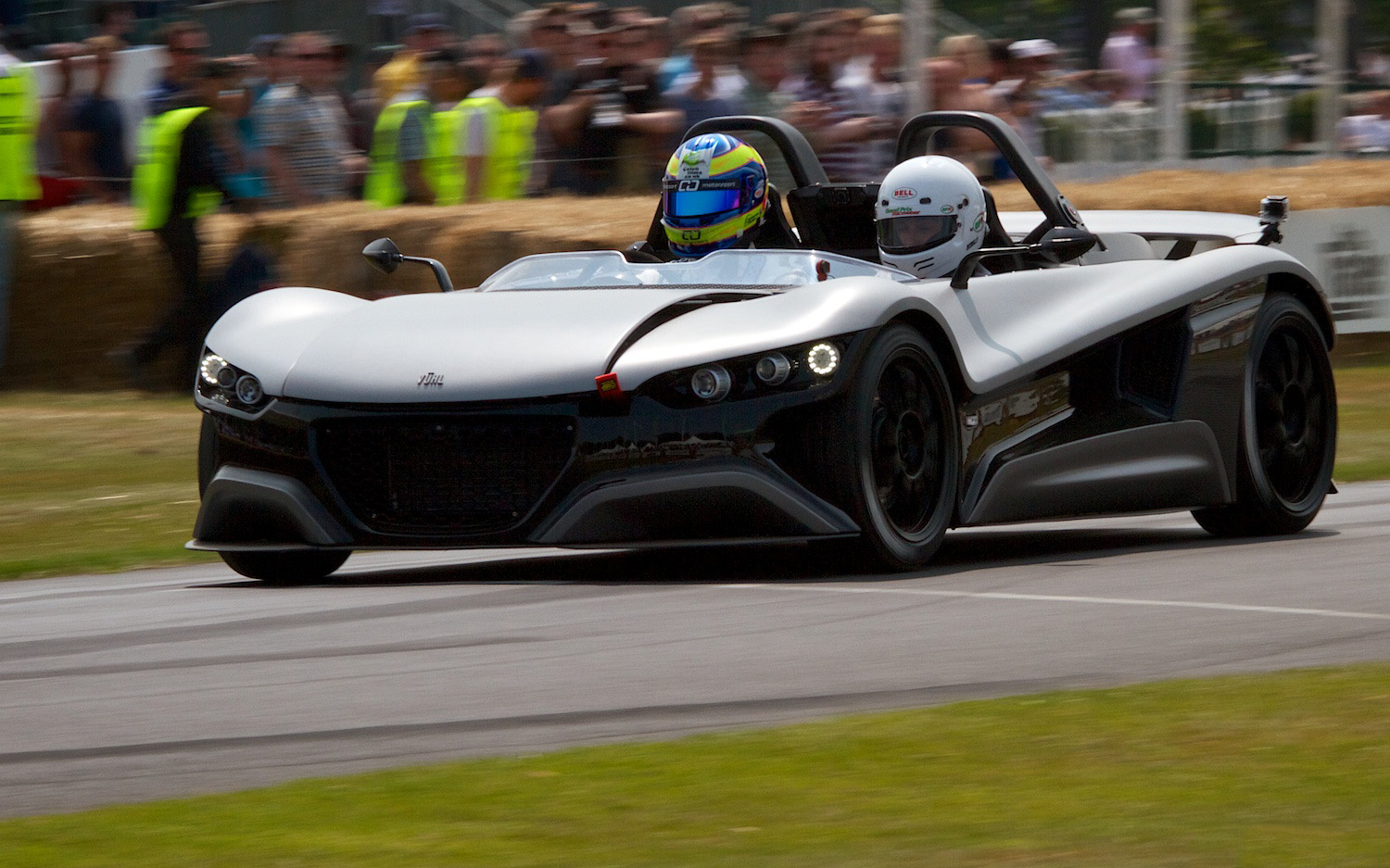
- VUHL 05 at Goodwood Festival of Speed 2013

Overview
- Manufacturer: VUHL
- Model years: 2015 – 2020
- Assembly: Querétaro, Mexico
- Designer: Iker Echeverria

Body and chassis
- Class: Sports car
- Body style: 2-door coupe
- Layout: Rear mid-engine, rear-wheel-drive layout

Powertrain
- Engine: EcoBoost 2.3 L turbocharged

Dimensions
- Wheelbase: 90.6 in (2,300 mm)
- Length: 146.4 in (3,718 mm)
- Width: 73.9 in (1,876 mm)
- Height: 1,120 mm (44.1 in)
- Curb weight: 660 kg (1,455 lb) dry 695 kg (1,532 lb) empty

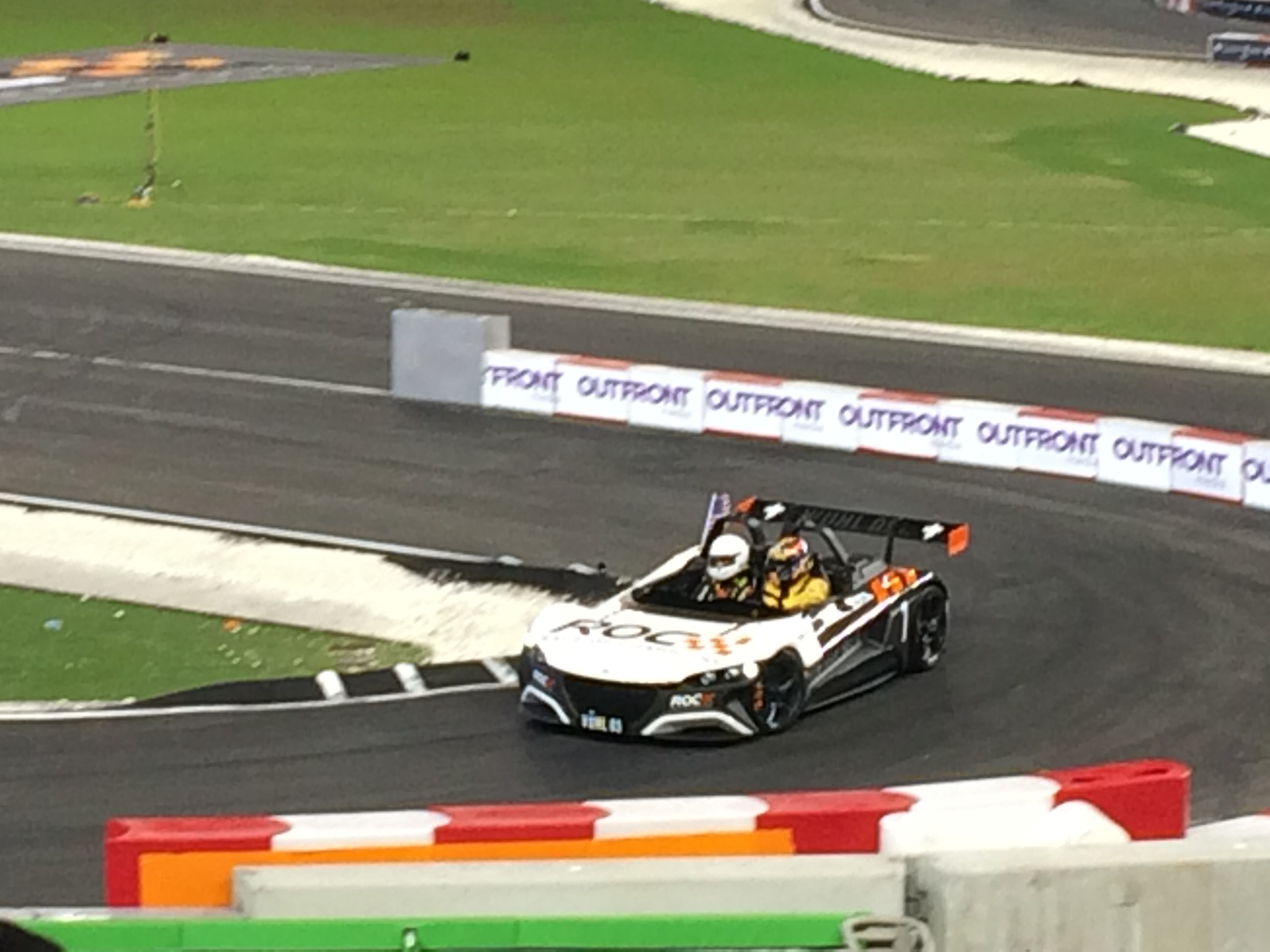
VUHL 05 at Race of Champions 2017

The VUHL 05 (pronounced ‘vool’, ‘oh five’) is a lightweight sports car in the B-segment, first presented in 2013 at the Royal Automobile Club in London. Customer car deliveries started in 2015, same year as the production of the vehicle was set up at a new plant in Querétaro, Mexico.

== Characteristics ==
The body of the car is fully made in carbon fiber, mounted on a bonded aluminium monocoque chassis (aluminium honeycomb with 6061-T6 aluminium extrusions), which are both made at their facilities in Querétaro. A hybrid aluminum - carbon monocoque chassis is available as an option. It started life with a Ford sourced 240-hp 2,000 cc four-cylinder EcoBoost engine, with an option of 285 HP similar to the previous one but with an optimized induction system and re-calibrated ECU; from 2018 to date it uses a Ford sourced 320-hp 2,300 cc four-cylinder EcoBoost engine with a 360-hp calibration available as performance option. It has a clearing distance of 110 millimetres (4.3 in) from the ground and its static weight distribution is 37% at the front and 63% at the back. The VUHL 05 reaches a maximum speed of 245 kilometres per hour (152 mph) and accelerates from 0 to 100 kilometres per hour (62 mph) in 3.7 seconds. It also decelerates from 100 kilometres per hour (62 mph) to 0 in 31.6 meters (104 ft), thanks to a bespoke high-performance aluminum Alcon braking system with 330 millimetres (13 in) discs in all four corners.

=== Race Of Champions ===
The 05 ROC Edition is a purpose-made race car largely based on the VUHL 05, with performance-oriented enhancements such as an aggressive suspension setup, Ultra high-flow 3" exhaust and Michelin motorsport tires, fabricated with the sole purpose of racing at the world-famous annual Race of Champions for the 5-year period from 2017 to 2021. It has set the fastest lap record at every track where it has raced so far.

=== VUHL 05RR ===
On June 13, 2016, the VUHL 05RR prototype was presented at the Goodwood Festival of Speed 2016, as an uprated version of the 05 with a clear focus towards an enhanced track experience. It was until the Race Of Champions Mexico, in January 2019 that the production-ready VUHL 05RR was unveiled. The RR designation stands for Road and Race, an indication of the car's focused character and supercar level performance. Compared to the standard 05, weight is reduced by 65 kg to 660 kg dry. The output of the 2,300 cc turbocharged inline-4 is increased to 400 hp and 380 lb-ft. These figures give a power-to-weight ratio of 600 hp/tonne, which coupled with the sequential paddle shift gearbox, results in a 0-60 time of 2.7 seconds.

A lightened flywheel, race clutch, and carbon fiber wheels significantly reduce rotational inertia, while lowering the powertrain in the chassis has dropped the center of gravity of the car by 50mm. A limited slip differential is standard, as are track-focused suspension and steering systems. Bespoke tire and suspension setups are available by special order. Grip is increased by an all-new high-downforce setup that includes a large single-plane rear wing. The car is capable of 1.8G of lateral acceleration.
