= Lincoln MKC =

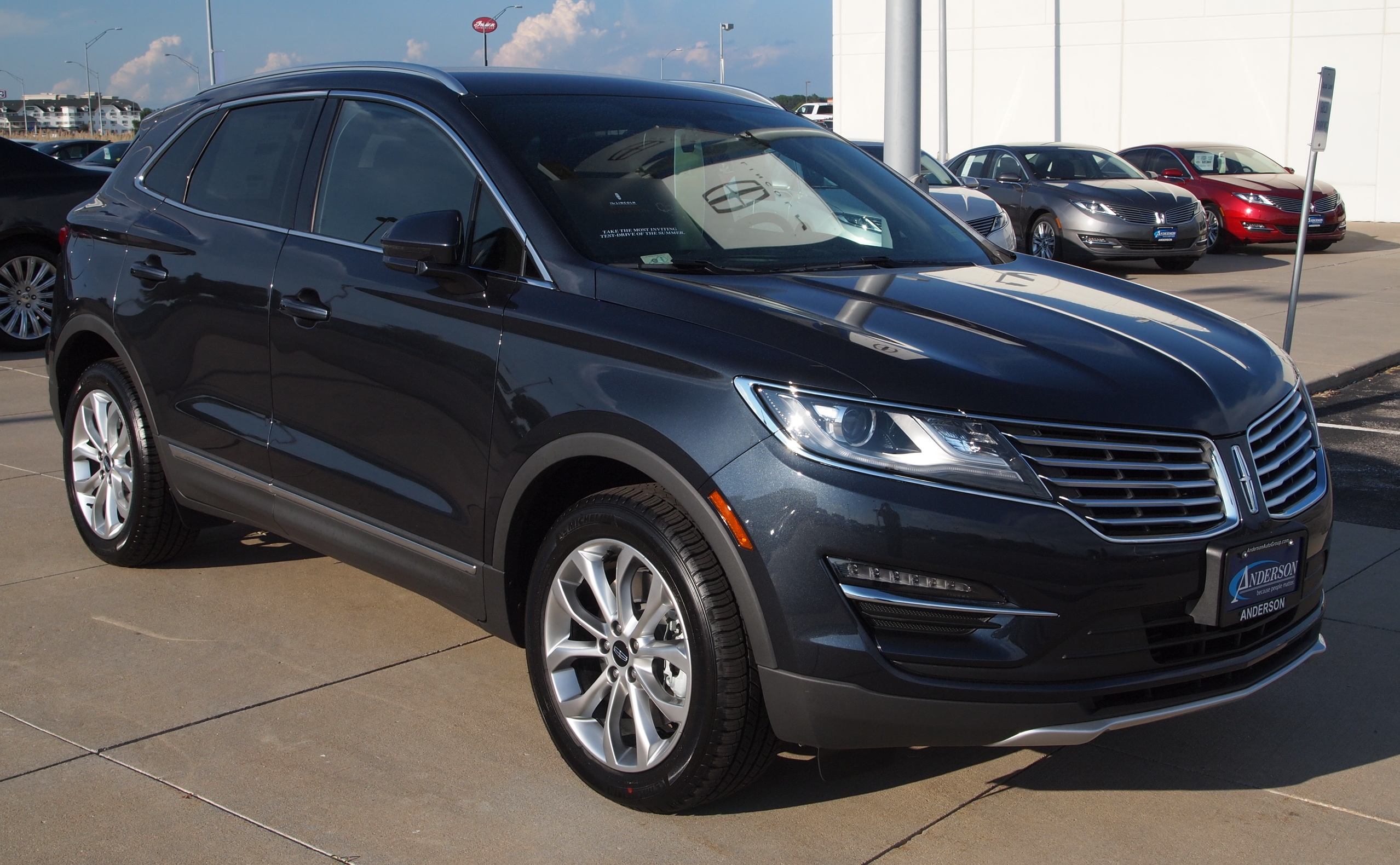
- 2015 Lincoln MKC

Overview
- Manufacturer: Ford
- Production: 2014–2019
- Model years: 2015–2019
- Assembly: United States: Louisville, Kentucky (Louisville Assembly Plant)

Body and chassis
- Class: Compact luxury crossover SUV
- Body style: 5-door SUV
- Layout: Front-engine, front-wheel-drive; Front-engine, all-wheel-drive
- Platform: Ford Global C
- Related: Ford Escape (Third generation); Ford Kuga (Second generation)

Powertrain
- Engine: Gasoline: 2.0 L EcoBoost turbo I4; 2.3 L EcoBoost turbo I4
- Transmission: 6-speed automatic

Dimensions
- Wheelbase: 105.9 in (2,690 mm)
- Length: 179.3 in (4,554 mm)
- Width: 73.4 in (1,860 mm)
- Height: 65.2 in (1,660 mm)

Chronology
- Predecessor: Mercury Mariner
- Successor: Lincoln Corsair

The Lincoln MKC is a compact luxury crossover produced by the automotive luxury brand Lincoln. Lincoln launched the MKC concept at the 2013 LA Auto Show and the production model officially went on sale in June 2014. The MKC is built upon the Ford Global C platform, shared with the Ford Escape small SUV.

For the 2020 model year, the MKC was replaced by the Lincoln Corsair, as Lincoln transitioned away from "MK" model nomenclatures.

== Model overview ==
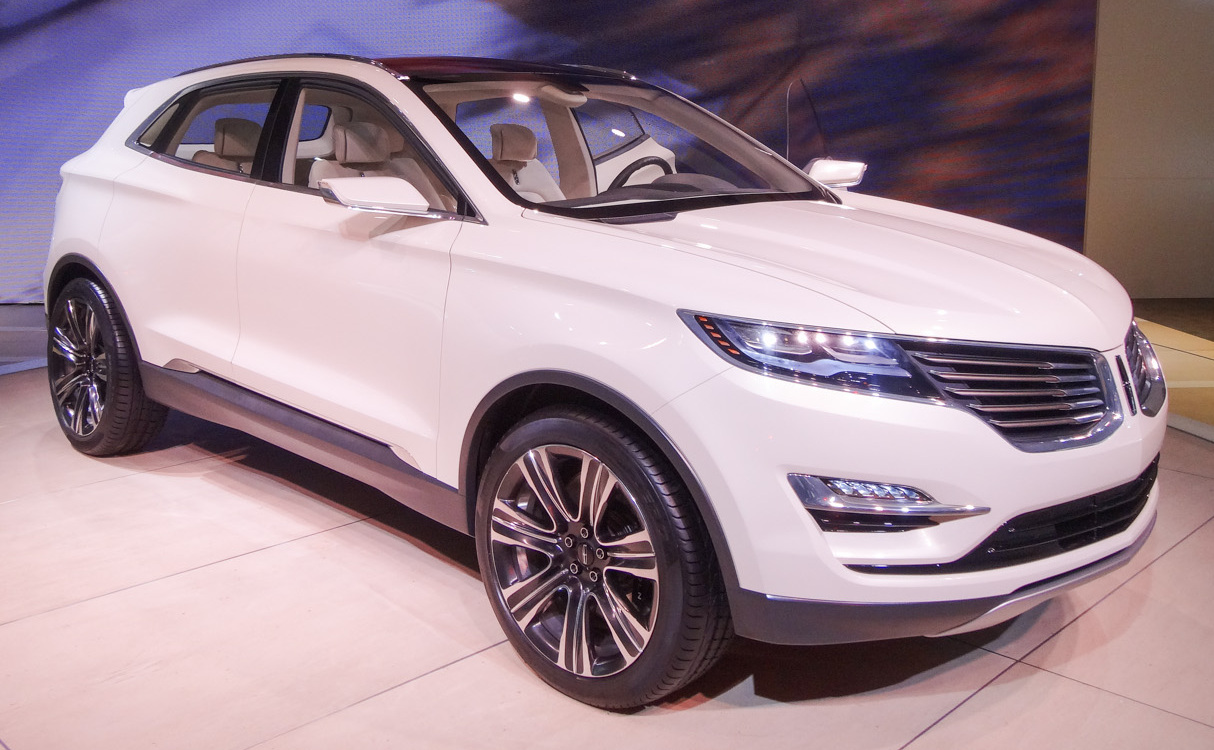
2013 Lincoln MKC concept

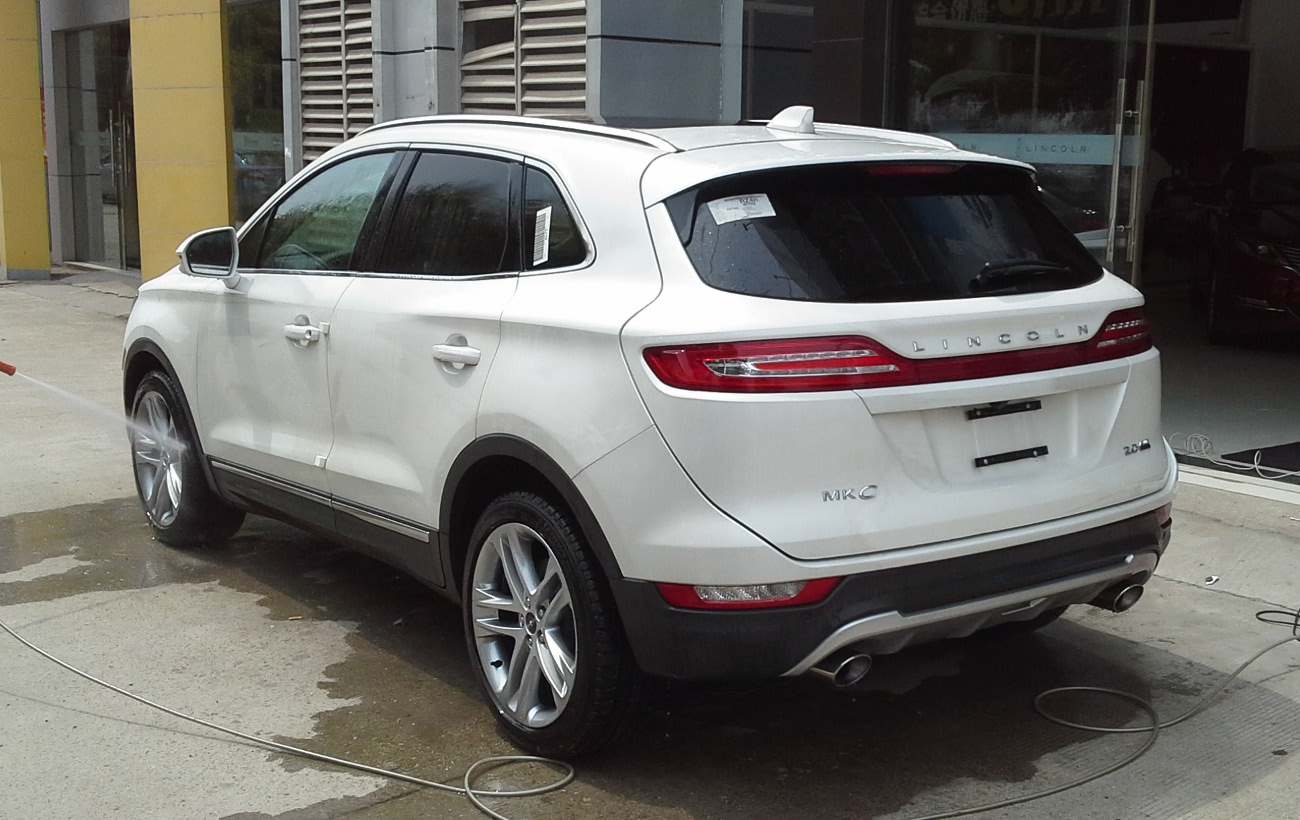
2015 Lincoln MKC (pre-facelift, rear)

Lincoln unveiled the MKC concept at the North American International Auto Show in Detroit in January 2013. The MKC went on sale in the summer of 2014 as a 2015 model. It is assembled at Louisville Assembly Plant. According to the manufacturer, the MKC further refines Lincoln's design traits originally embodied on the second generation MKZ.

For the 2016 model year, Lincoln replaced the MyLincoln Touch infotainment system with the SYNC 3 system. On the Select trim level, the power liftgate was made standard. For versions with the 2.3L engine, maximum towing capacity was increased to 3000 pounds.

For 2017, Apple CarPlay and Android Auto were added to the SYNC 3 system and power liftgate and automatic brake hold were made standard.

For 2018, Lincoln added the Lincoln Connect 4G Wi-Fi system (standard on all trims). Premium models received four way power lumbar control for the driver seat and power lumbar was added for both seats on Select and higher trims.

=== 2019 facelift ===
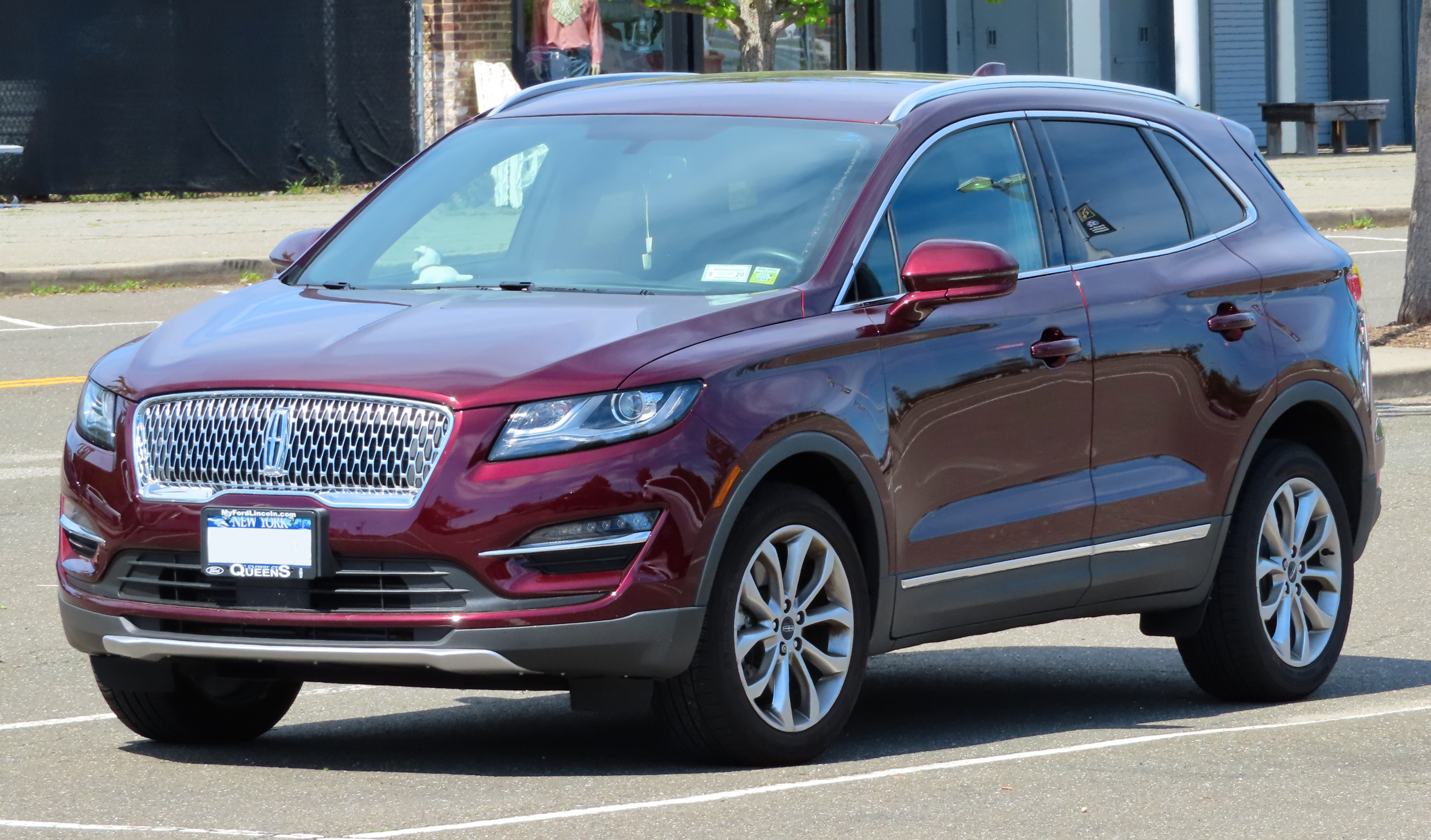
2019 Lincoln MKC (facelift, front)

In 2018, for the 2019 model year, the MKC received a refresh, which a rectangular corporate grille, replacing the split-wing grille.

=== Powertrain ===
The standard engine is a 2.0-liter 4-cylinder EcoBoost gasoline engine generating 245 hp (183 kW; 248 PS) and 275 lb⋅ft (373 N⋅m) of torque. A 2.3-liter four cylinder EcoBoost gasoline engine generating 285 hp (213 kW; 289 PS) and 305 lb⋅ft (414 N⋅m) is also offered.

The 6-speed, computer-controlled automatic transmission is activated with a transmission selector; it uses buttons installed to the left of the MyLincoln Touch infotainment touch screen labeled "P, R, N, D, S", a revival of an approach used in the 1950s by the Chrysler PowerFlite transmission and the Packard Touchbutton Ultramatic. The "S" transmission selection represents "Sport" mode, where the Continuously Controlled Damping suspension, electric power steering and transmission shift points take on a different posture.

=== Trims ===
Trim levels include the standard model, Premiere, Select, Reserve and top-level Black Label. In line with the Designer Series of the 1970s Mark IV and Mark V, the Black Label trim a series of themed appearance packages developed specifically for each Lincoln model line. The MKC Black Label offers the "Center Stage" (unique to the MKC), "Modern Heritage" and "Indulgence" theme appearance packages.

== Marketing ==
In August 2014, Lincoln signed a multi-year endorsement contract with actor Matthew McConaughey to star in a series of spots promoting the 2015 MKC.

To also market the new MKC, Lincoln introduced the Lincoln Date Night promotion, which allows those who qualify and participate to experience an extended test drive in the 2015 MKC and dinner for two at a restaurant of their choice, compliments of Lincoln.

== Sales ==
| Calendar year | United States | China |
|---|---|---|
| 2014 | 13,077 | —N/a |
| 2015 | 24,590 | 7,724 |
| 2016 | 25,562 | 13,891 |
| 2017 | 27,048 | 18,247 |
| 2018 | 26,241 | 17,282 |
| 2019 | 25,815* | 11,691** |
| 2020 | | 912 |

*Figure includes Corsair sales

**Figure does not include Corsair sales
