= Ford EcoBlue engine =

Overview
- Manufacturer: Ford
- Also called: "Panther"
- Production: 2016–present

Layout
- Configuration: Straight-4
- Displacement: 2.0 L; 121.7 cu in (1,995 cc); 1.5 L; 91.4 cu in (1,498 cc)
- Cylinder bore: 84.01 mm (3.31 in); 75 mm (2.95 in)
- Piston stroke: 90.03 mm (3.54 in); 84.8 mm (3.34 in)
- Cylinder block material: 1.5: Aluminium; 2.0: Iron
- Cylinder head material: Aluminium
- Valvetrain: DOHC 4 valves x cyl.

Combustion
- Turbocharger: Low-inertia twin-scroll, twin-turbo, variable-geometry with intercooler (on some versions)
- Fuel system: Common rail direct injection
- Fuel type: Diesel
- Cooling system: Water-cooled

Output
- Power output: 105–238 PS (77–175 kW; 104–235 hp)
- Torque output: 300–500 N⋅m (221–369 lb⋅ft)

Emissions
- Emissions target standard: Euro 6

Chronology
- Predecessor: Ford Duratorq engine/PSA DW engine/Ford DLD engine

EcoBlue is the marketing name for a range of diesel engines from Ford of Europe. The EcoBlue engines were developed under the codename "Panther" by Ford engineering teams in the UK and Germany, and replaced the Duratorq diesel engine family, offering optimised fuel efficiency and reduced CO_{2} and NO_{x} emissions.

An initial 2.0-litre (1,995 cc) variant will be offered with 105, 130 and 170 PS (77, 96 and 125 kW; 104, 128 and 168 hp) in commercial vehicle applications. This engine architecture is capable of delivering more than 200 PS (147 kW; 197 hp), and will later feature with such power outputs in Ford passenger cars, alongside a 1.5-litre (1,498 cc) variant.

In early 2018 Ford launched its Ranger Raptor with a biturbo 2.0-litre (1,995 cc) EcoBlue producing 213 PS (157 kW; 210 hp) and 500 N⋅m (369 lb⋅ft) of torque. Also in 2018 Ford launched an even higher spec biturbo 2.0-litre (1,995 cc) EcoBlue producing 238 PS (175 kW; 235 hp) for the Edge Titanium, ST-Line and Vignale SUV in Europe. A North American-spec version of the biturbo 2.0-litre (1,995 cc) EcoBlue was planned debut in the 2020 Transit, but production of the engine was canceled before launch due to the COVID-19 pandemic as well as a lack of market demand to justify federalising the engine.

== Claimed improvements ==
An all-new engine architecture is claimed to deliver reduced friction and a clean-burning combustion system. The engines will meet Euro 6 emissions standards. Ford says that a 13 percent improvement in fuel efficiency is obtained through friction reduction enhancements.

A new strong lightweight engine block features an aluminium ladder frame on the bottom for strength and stiffness that reduces noise and vibration. The crankshaft from the piston is offset by 10mm to allow piston side load against the cylinder wall to be reduced hence decreasing friction and wear with the diameter also reduced to improve efficiency.

New belt-in-oil system are being used to drive the cams to reduce friction while the head's intake system is engineered to equally balance the air between each cylinder.

Centralized eight-hole-nozzle piezo injectors are being used to inject diesel at 2,000 bar, much higher than previous engines.

== Specifications ==
Displacement	Bore x Stroke	Power	Torque	Year	Applications
2.0 L (1,995 cc)	84.01 mm × 90.03 mm (3.31 in × 3.54 in)	105 PS (77 kW; 104 hp)	360 N⋅m (266 lb⋅ft)	2016 -	Ford Transit (non-USA); Ford Transit Custom (non-USA)
2.0 L (1,995 cc)	84.01 mm × 90.03 mm (3.31 in × 3.54 in)	130 PS (96 kW; 128 hp)	385 N⋅m (284 lb⋅ft)	2016 -	Ford Transit (non-USA)
2.0 L (1,995 cc)	84.01 mm × 90.03 mm (3.31 in × 3.54 in)	150 PS (110 kW; 148 hp)	370 N⋅m (273 lb⋅ft)	2018 -	Ford Focus (fourth generation)
2.0 L (1,995 cc)	84.01 mm × 90.03 mm (3.31 in × 3.54 in)	170 PS (125 kW; 168 hp)	405 N⋅m (299 lb⋅ft)	2016 -	Ford Transit Custom
2.0 L (1,995 cc)	84.01 mm × 90.03 mm (3.31 in × 3.54 in)	180 PS (132 kW; 178 hp)	420 N⋅m (310 lb⋅ft)	2018 -	Ford Everest; Ford Ranger T6 2019 (Thailand); Ford Ranger T6 2019 (South Africa)
2.0 L (1,995 cc)	84.01 mm × 90.03 mm (3.31 in × 3.54 in)	190 PS (140 kW; 187 hp)	400 N⋅m (295 lb⋅ft)	2018 -	Ford Endura (Australia)
2.0 L (1,995 cc)	84.01 mm × 90.03 mm (3.31 in × 3.54 in)	190 PS (140 kW; 187 hp)	420 N⋅m (310 lb⋅ft)	2019 -	Ford Focus (fourth generation); Ford Mondeo (fourth generation)
2.0 L (1,995 cc)	84.01 mm × 90.03 mm (3.31 in × 3.54 in)	213 PS (157 kW; 210 hp) (biturbo version)	500 N⋅m (369 lb⋅ft)	2018 -	Ford Ranger Raptor; Ford Everest; Ford Ranger T6
1.5 L (1,498 cc)	75 mm × 84.8 mm (2.95 in × 3.34 in)	85 PS (63 kW; 84 bhp)	215 N⋅m (159 lb⋅ft)	2017-	Ford Fiesta (seventh generation)
1.5 L (1,498 cc)	75 mm × 84.8 mm (2.95 in × 3.34 in)	95 PS (70 kW; 94 bhp)	300 N⋅m (221 lbf⋅ft)	2018-	Ford Focus (fourth generation)
1.5 L (1,498 cc)	75 mm × 84.8 mm (2.95 in × 3.34 in)	100 PS (74 kW; 99 hp)	250 N⋅m (184 lb⋅ft)	2020-	Ford Focus (fourth generation); Ford Transit Courier; Ford Fiesta (seventh generation); Ford EcoSport; Ford Puma
1.5 L (1,498 cc)	75 mm × 84.8 mm (2.95 in × 3.34 in)	120 PS (88 kW; 118 hp)	300 N⋅m (221 lb⋅ft)	2018-	Ford Focus (fourth generation); Ford Transit Connect; Ford Tourneo Connect; Ford Kuga; Ford Mondeo (fourth generation); Ford S-MAX; Ford Galaxy; Ford Fiesta (seventh generation); Ford EcoSport; Ford Puma

== See also ==
- Ford Duratorq engine
- List of Ford engines
