= Ford Puma (crossover) =

Subcompact crossover SUV

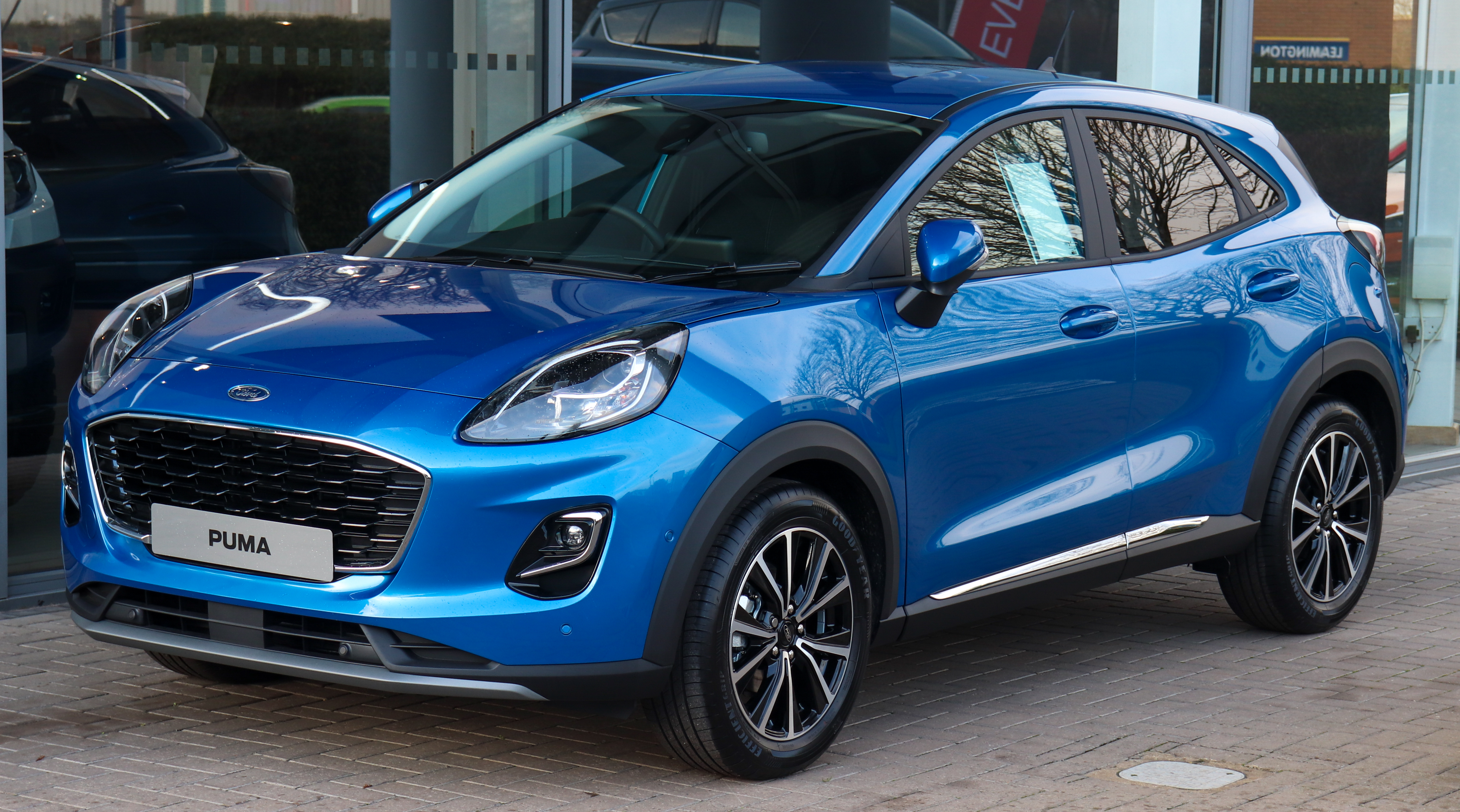
- 2020 Puma Titanium (pre-facelift)

Overview
- Manufacturer: Ford
- Production: 2019–present
- Assembly: Romania: Craiova (Ford Romania)
- Designer: Thomas Morel

Body and chassis
- Class: Subcompact SUV (B-segment)
- Body style: 5-door crossover SUV
- Layout: Front-engine, front-wheel-drive
- Platform: Ford global B-car platform
- Related: Ford Fiesta (seventh generation)

Powertrain
- Engine: Petrol: 1.0 L EcoBoost Fox I3-T; 1.5 L EcoBoost Dragon I3-T (Puma ST); Petrol mild hybrid: 1.0 L EcoBoost Hybrid Fox mHEV I3-T; Diesel: 1.5 L EcoBlue Panther I4-T
- Electric motor: 11.5 kW (15.4 hp) belt-driven integrated starter/generator (BISG); 150 kW (200 hp) Permanent magnet synchronous motor
- Power output: List: 70 kW (94 hp; 95 PS); 88 kW (118 hp; 120 PS); 92 kW (123 hp; 125 PS); 114 kW (152 hp; 155 PS); 125 kW (168 hp; 170 PS); 147 kW (197 hp; 200 PS)
- Transmission: 6-speed manual 7-speed dual-clutch
- Hybrid drivetrain: EcoBoost Hybrid mHEV
- Battery: 48-volt, 0.48 kWh battery pack (mild hybrid)

Dimensions
- Wheelbase: 2,588 mm (101.9 in)
- Length: 4,186 mm (164.8 in)
- Width: 1,805 mm (71.1 in)
- Height: 1,537 mm (60.5 in)
- Kerb weight: 1,205 kg (2,657 lb)

Chronology
- Predecessor: Ford EcoSport (Australasia and South Africa)

The Ford Puma is a subcompact crossover SUV (B-segment) manufactured and marketed by Ford since 2019. It is based on the seventh-generation Fiesta.

Sales started in Europe in 2019, in Australasia in late 2020, and in South Africa from October 2023. In the European market, the Puma is positioned above the EcoSport and below the Kuga (also called Escape outside Europe).

== Overview ==
Ford first announced the Puma crossover at its event Go Further in Amsterdam, along with the introduction of the third-generation Kuga. The Puma nameplate was last used on the Puma sport compact. The vehicle is based on the seventh-generation Fiesta platform (Ford Global B-car platform).

Production of the Puma started in Craiova, Romania (Ford Romania) in October 2019 along with the EcoSport subcompact crossover and the EcoBoost 1.0 L Fox engine used in both cars. Ford invested 200 million euros, and employed 1,700 people on the project.

The Puma is offered with a mild hybrid 1.0-litre EcoBoost three cylinder turbo gasoline engine with a belt-driven integrated starter, which uses energy from the braking system to charge the 48-volt lithium-ion battery pack to increase torque and lower emissions. Power is rated at 153 bhp (155 PS), 114 kW, and 240 N⋅m (180 lb⋅ft) with an additional 50 N⋅m (37 lb⋅ft) from the integrated starter system.

In December 2022, the Puma Vivid Ruby Edition was unveiled as the new flagship trim.

In March 2023, the Puma ST Powershift was officially launched with a 170 hp (130 kW) 1.0L mild-hybrid engine and an automatic transmission.

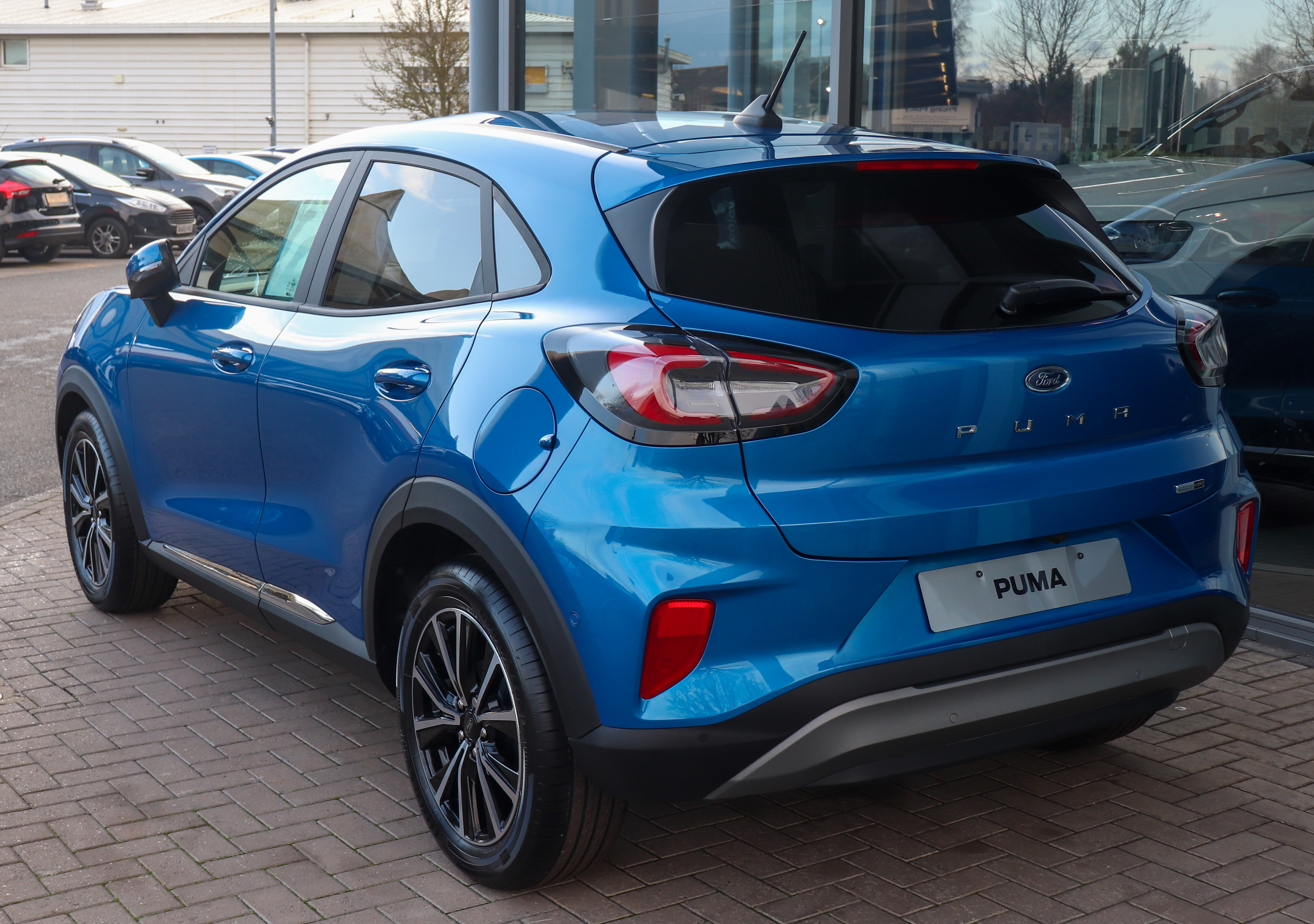
Rear view (pre-facelift)

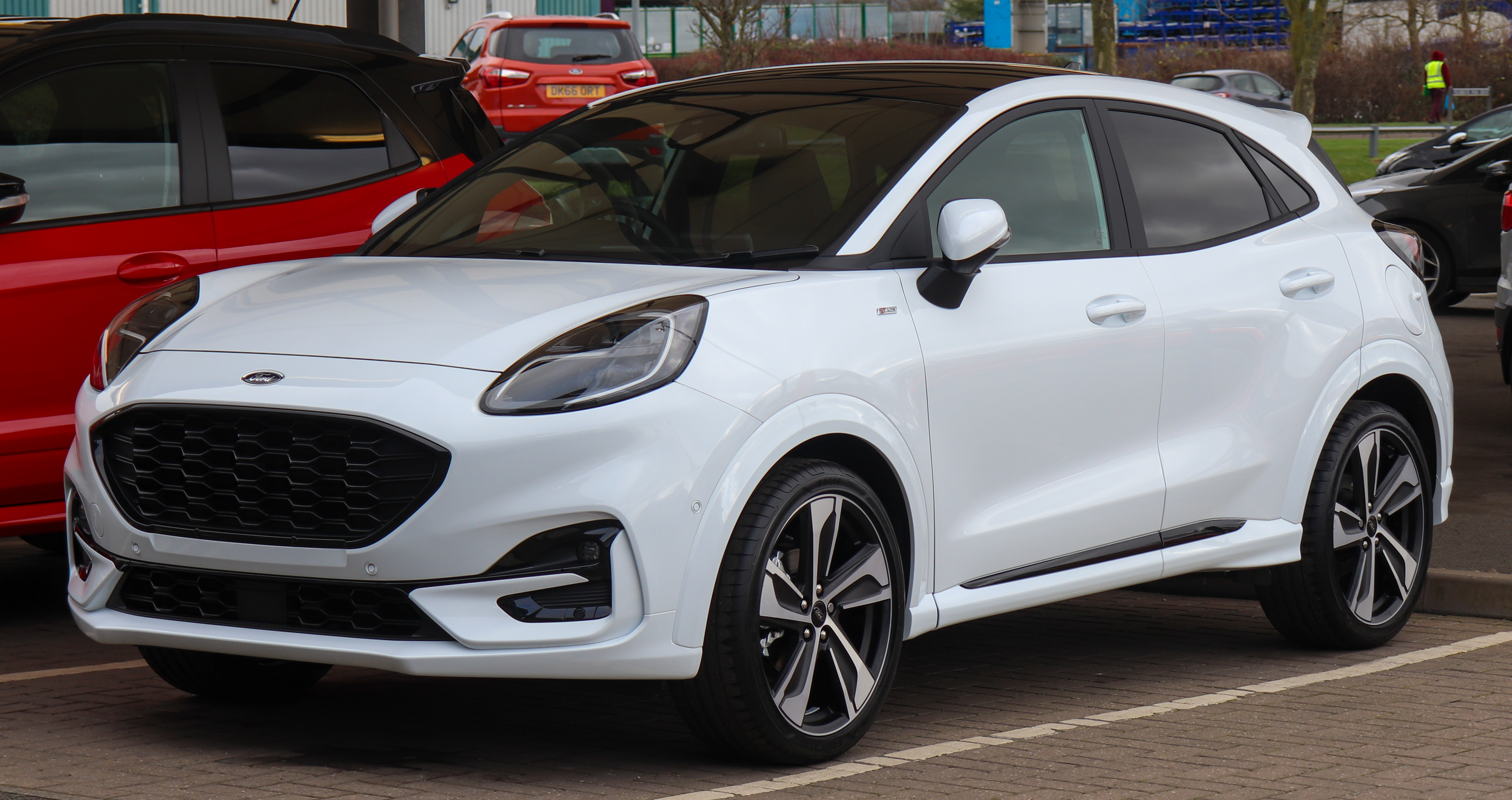
2020 Puma ST-Line X (pre-facelift; front)

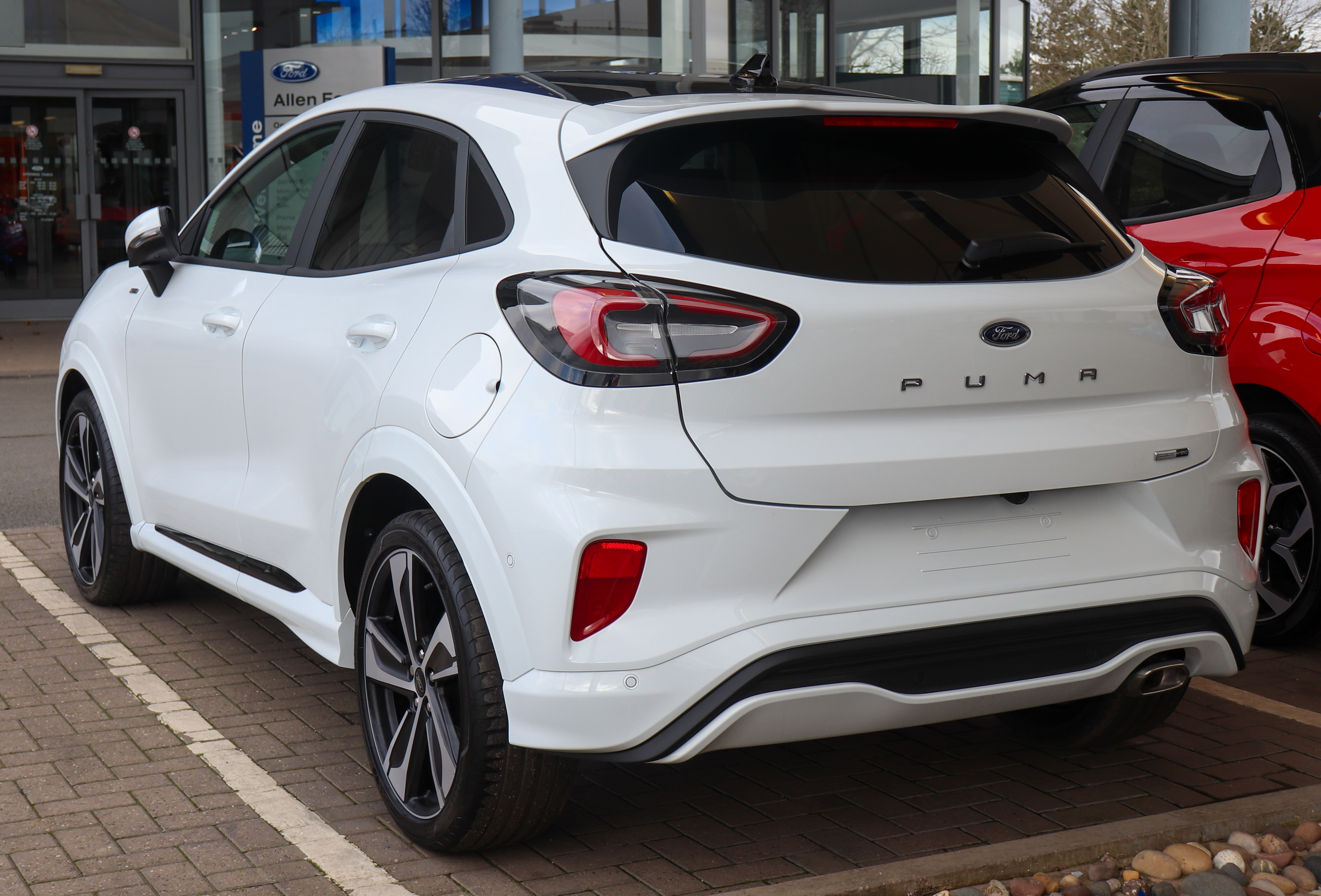
2020 Puma ST-Line X (pre-facelift; rear)

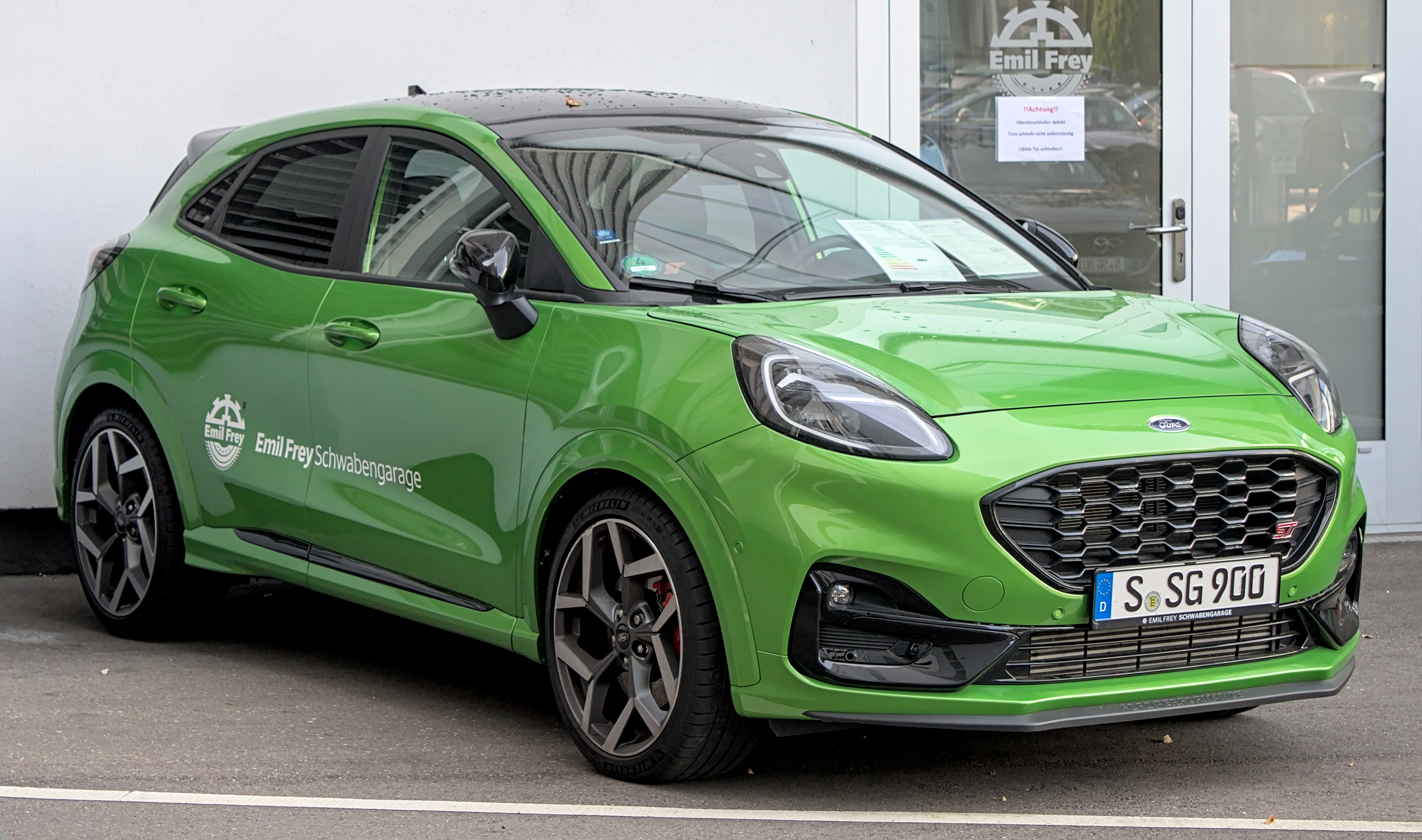
Puma ST (pre-facelift; front)

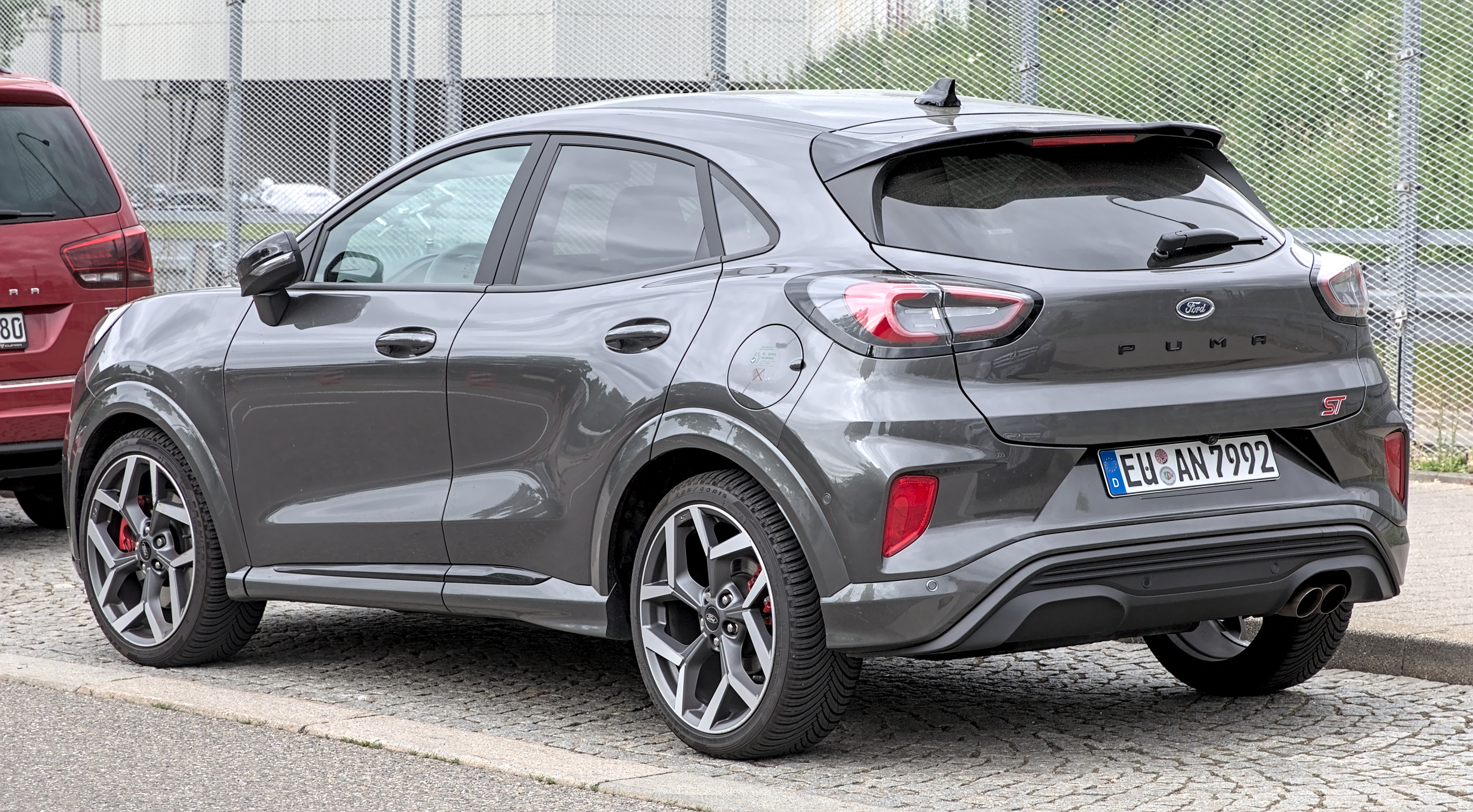
Puma ST (pre-facelift; rear)

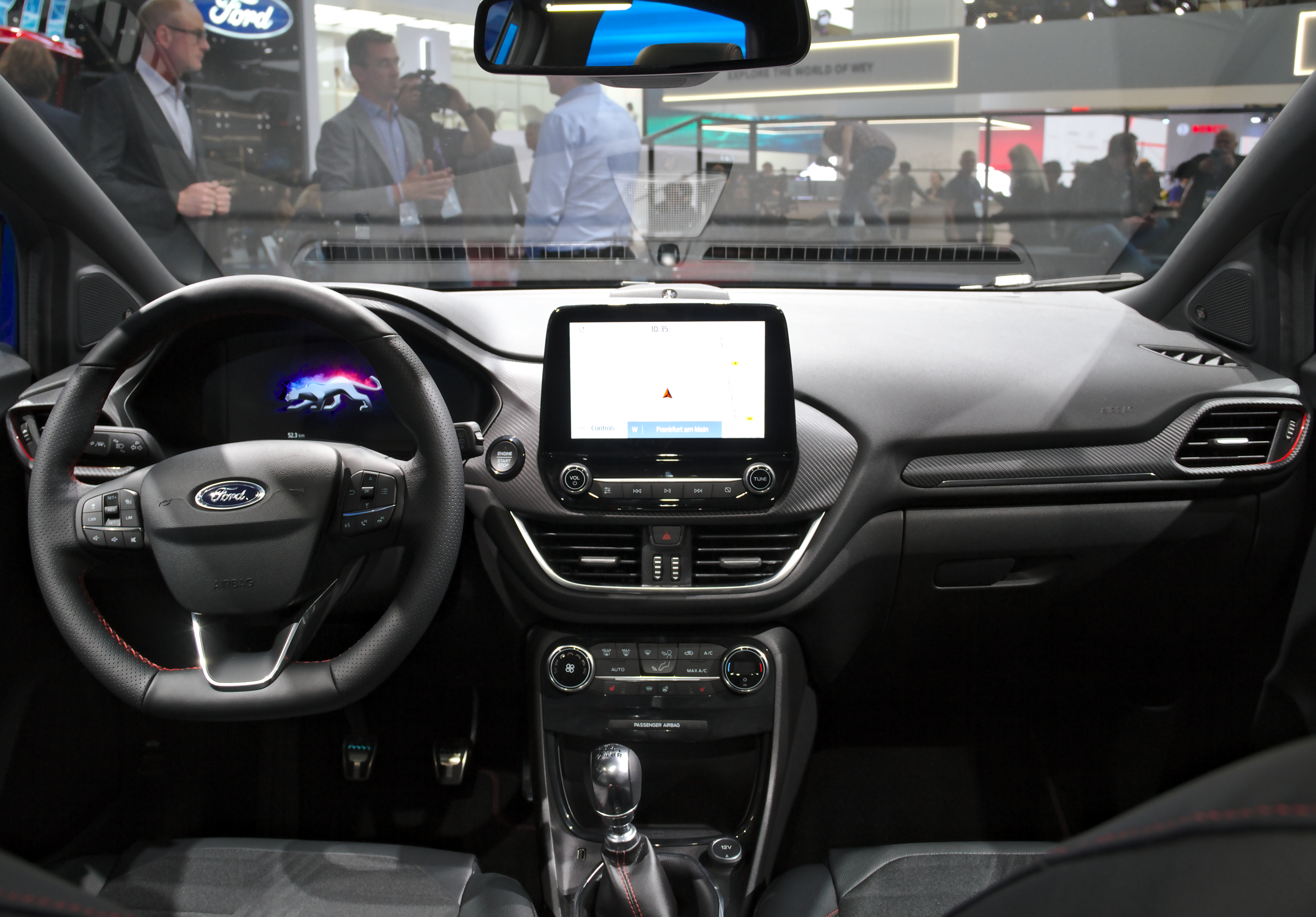
Interior (pre-facelift)

== Facelift ==
The Puma received a significant facelift in February 2024, with updated exterior design featuring a revamped front grille, new headlights, and slimmer bumper designs. The interior was also updated, with revised materials, a larger infotainment screen, and enhanced connectivity options. In order to remain competitive in its class, the vehicle offered more efficient engine choices as well as innovative driver-assistance systems.

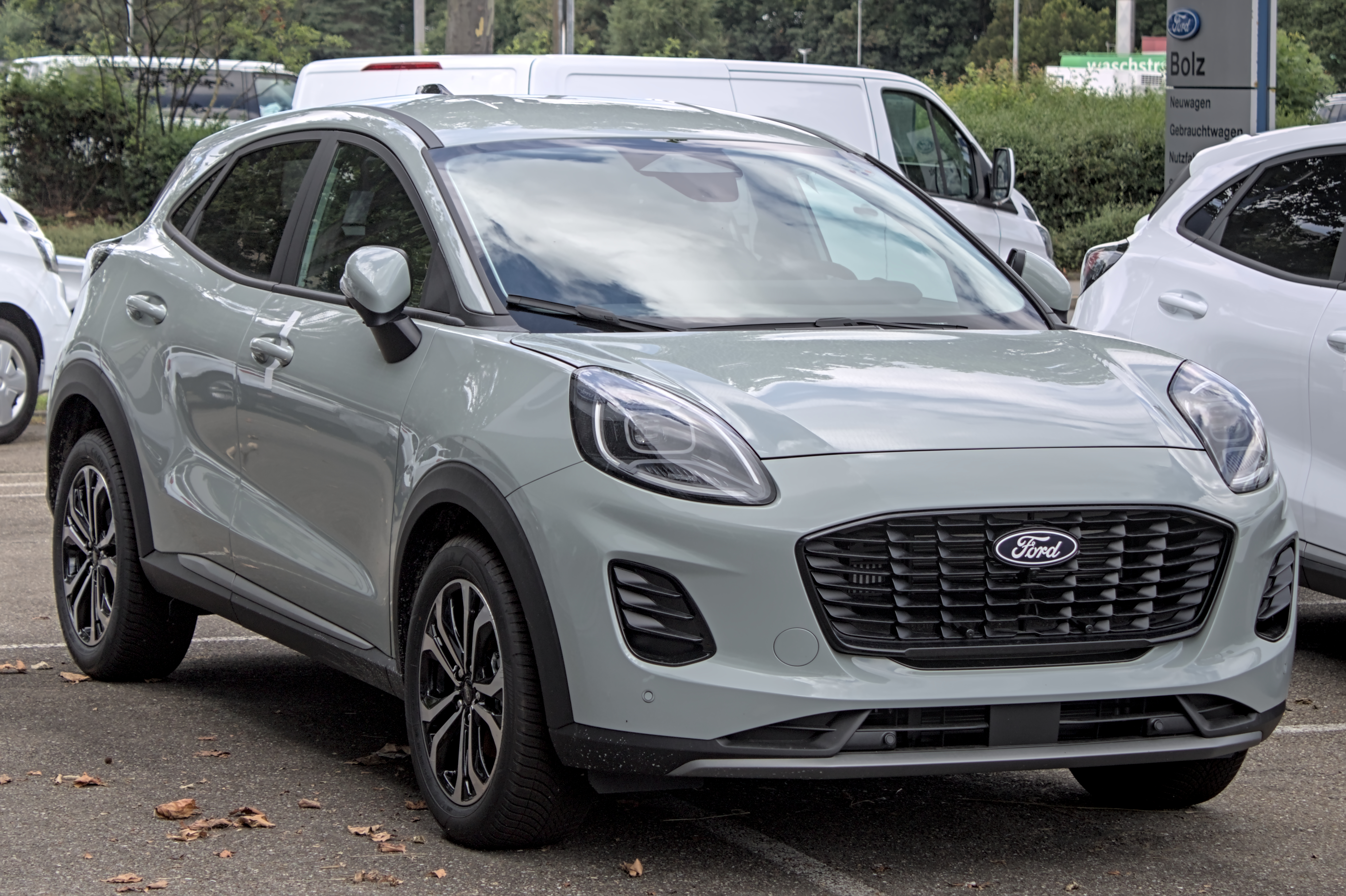
Facelift Puma (front)

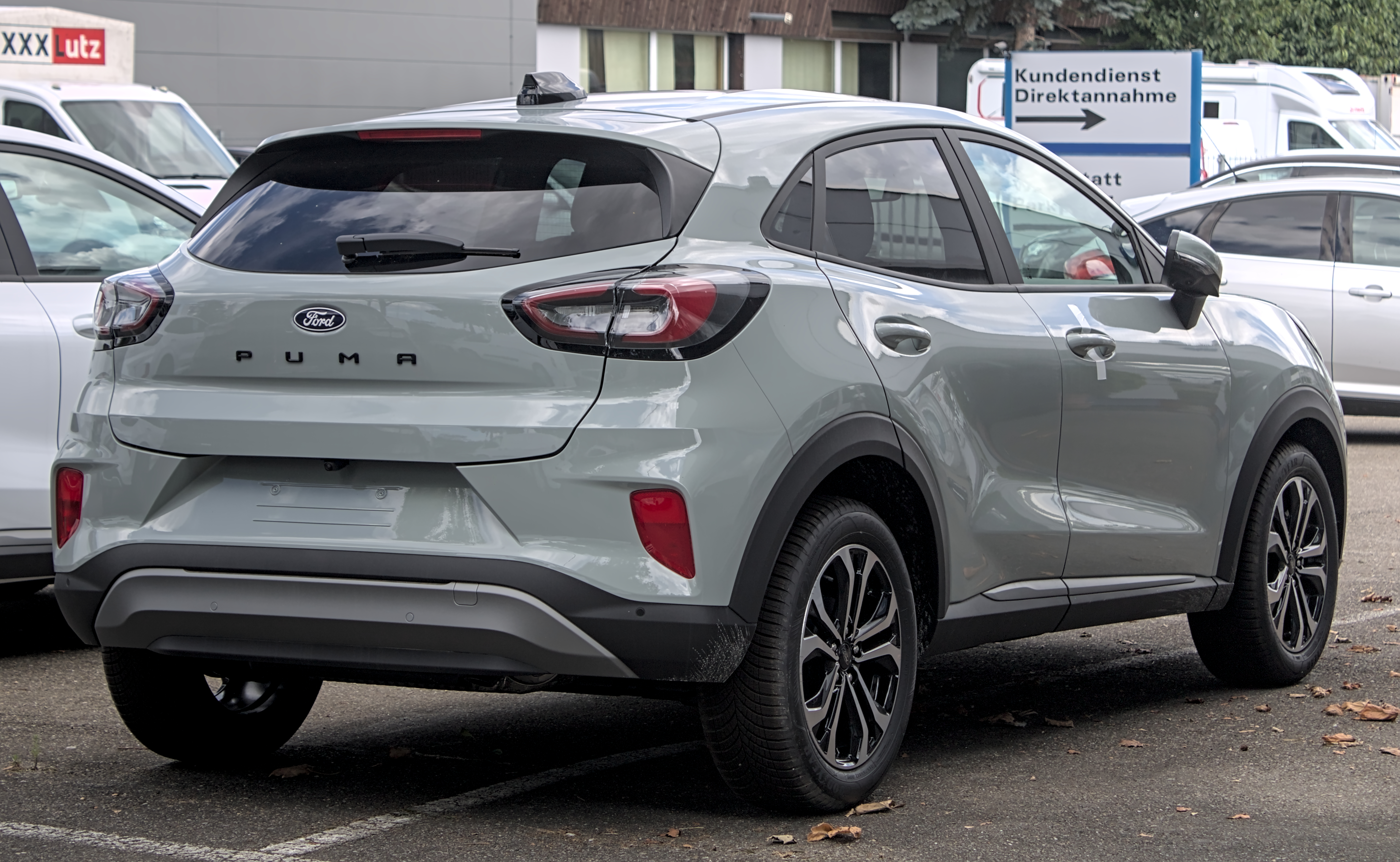
Facelift Puma (rear)

== Puma Gen-E ==
Puma Gen-E
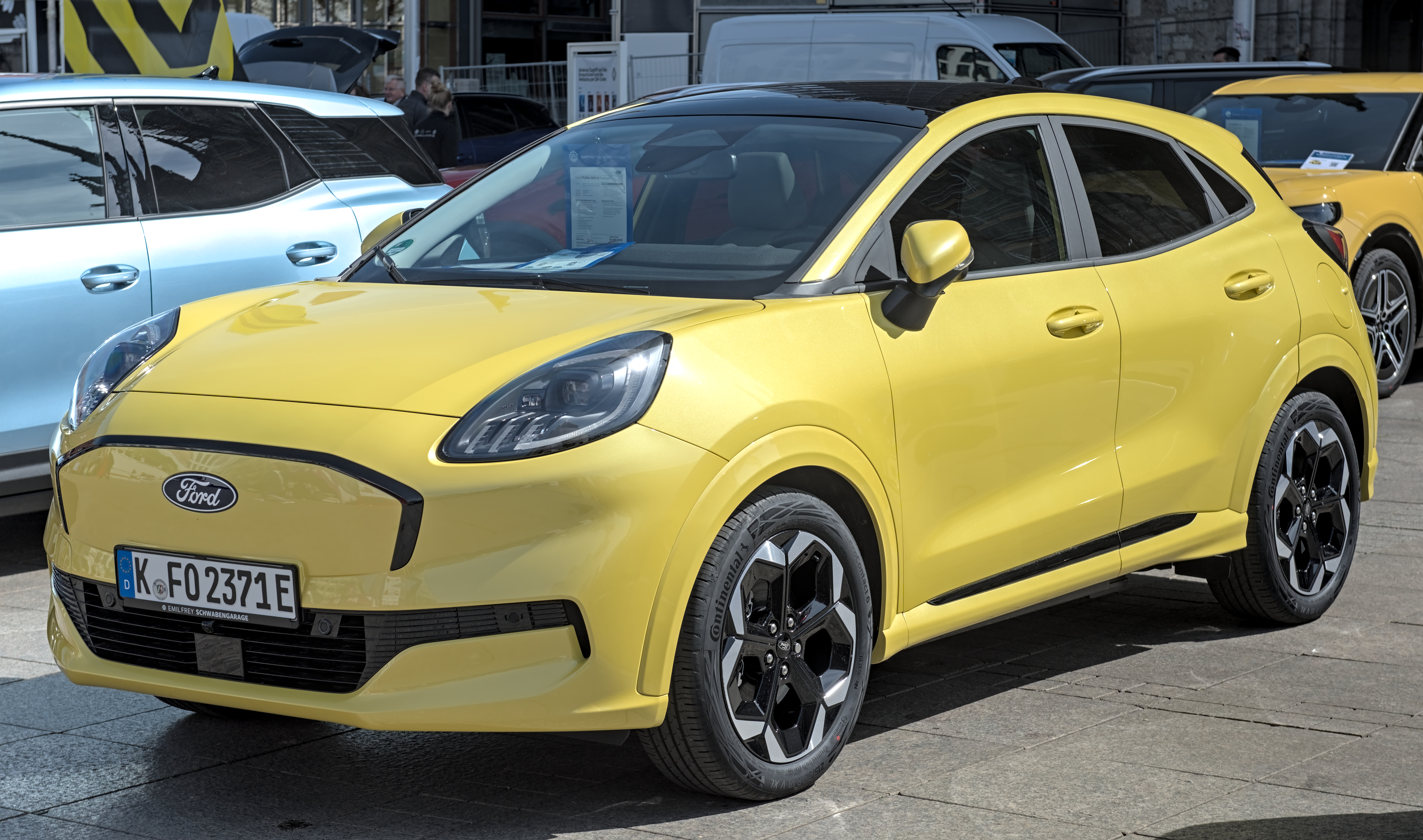
- 2025 Puma Gen-E

Overview
- Production: 2024–present

Body and chassis
- Layout: Front-motor, front-wheel-drive

Powertrain
- Power output: 168 PS (124 kW; 166 hp)
- Battery: 46.0 kWh NMC SK On
- Electric range: 347–376 km (216–234 mi) (WLTP)
- Plug-in charging: DC: 100 kW (10-80% in 23 minutes)

Dimensions
- Wheelbase: 2,588 mm (101.9 in)
- Length: 4,214 mm (165.9 in)
- Width: 1,805 mm (71.1 in)
- Height: 1,555 mm (61.2 in)
- Curb weight: 1,563 kg (3,446 lb)

As previously announced in 2022, the electric version of the Puma, the Puma Gen-E, was launched on 3 December 2024.

The compact electric crossover SUV is produced at Ford Otosan's plant in Craiova, Romania, with electric drive units manufactured at Ford's Halewood plant in the United Kingdom. It features design elements reminiscent of the larger Mustang Mach-E, while maintaining the smaller body of the combustion-engined Puma.

The vehicle is equipped with a 46.0 kWh (43.6 kWh usable) NMC lithium-ion battery pack supplied by SK On. The battery pack powers a front-mounted electric motor that delivers 123.5 kW (166 hp; 168 PS) and 290 N⋅m (214 lb⋅ft) of torque, allowing acceleration from 0 to 100 km/h (62 mph) in 8.0 seconds with a top speed of 160 km/h (99 mph). The Puma Gen-E has a WLTP combined range between 347–376 km (216–234 mi) and a city range of 506–523 km (314–325 mi). Notable features include DC fast charging capability at 100 kW, allowing a 10–80% charge in approximately 23 minutes, and the "GigaBox" underfloor storage compartment that increases boot space to 574 litres (20.3 cu ft), complemented by a 43-litre (1.5 cu ft) front trunk. Deliveries to European customers commenced in spring 2025.

At launch, the Puma Gen-E received generally positive reviews, with Top Gear writing that the car "turned out remarkably well" and Electrifying writing that "it's got the practicality and value to be really popular." Autocar gave Puma Gen-E four stars because the "Huge boot, compact dimensions, brilliant real-world efficiency and fun dynamics make the Puma Gen-E a great choice."

The Puma Gen-E uses McPherson struts for front suspension and a torsion beam for the rear suspension.

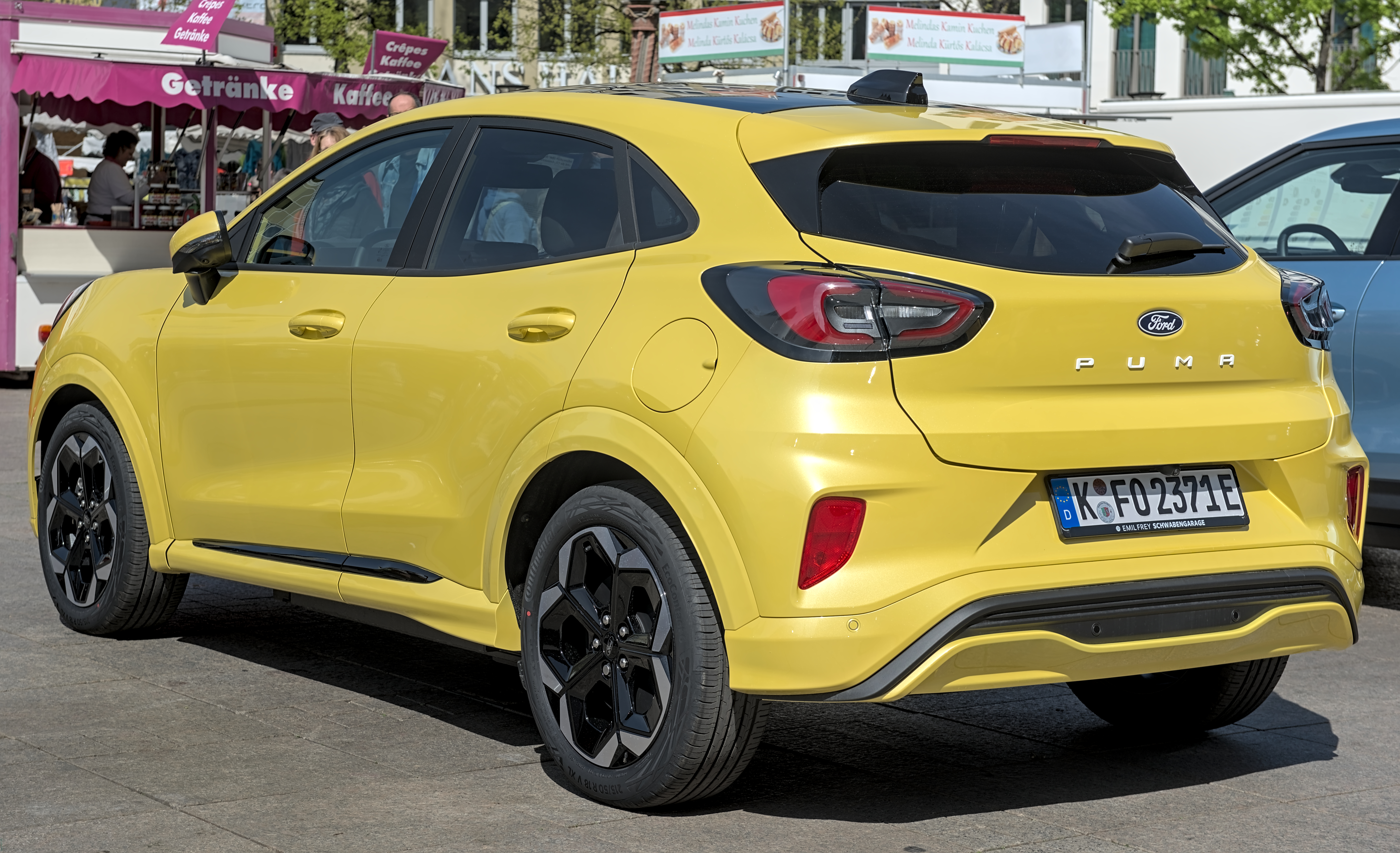
Rear view

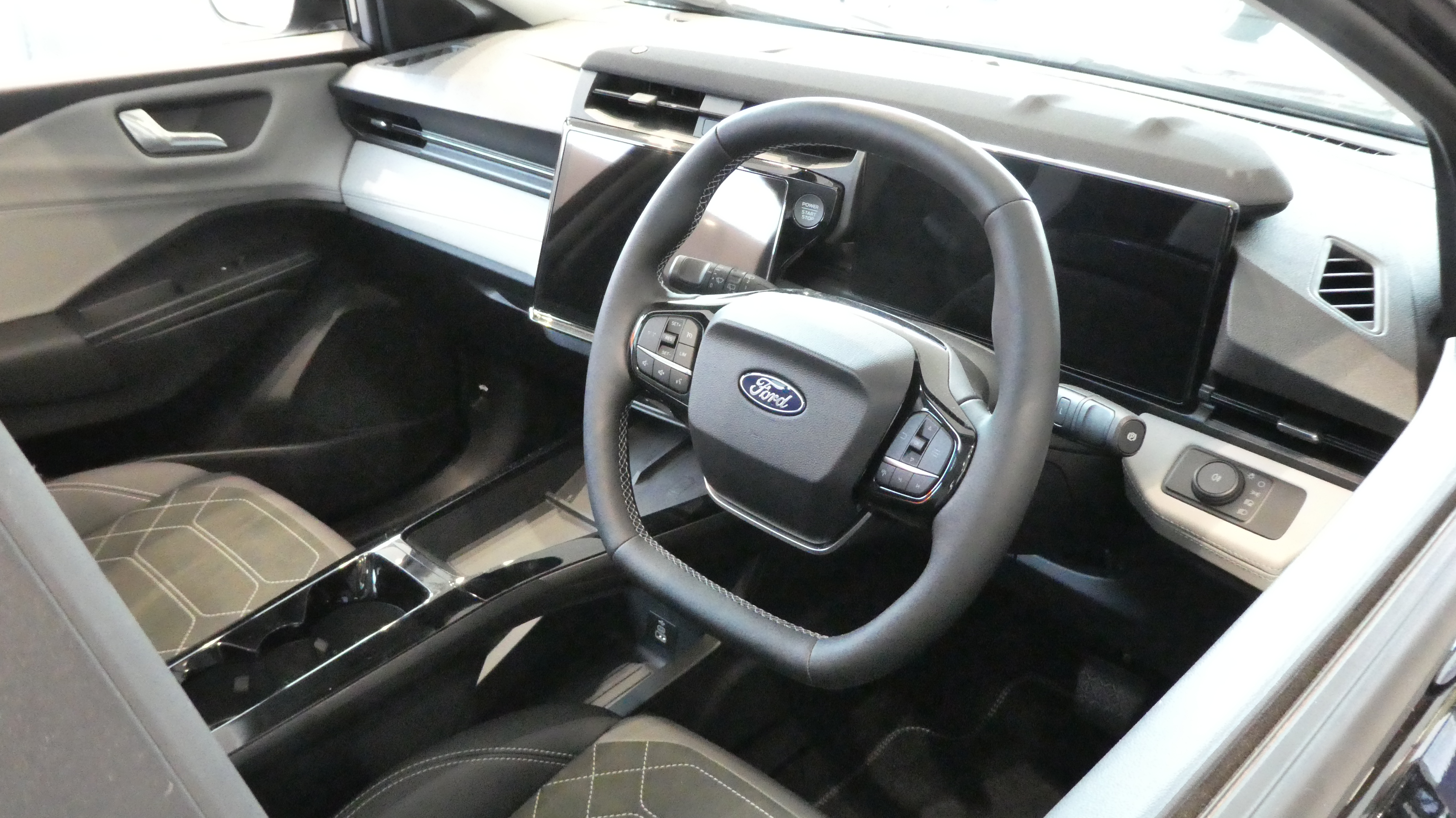
Interior

== Safety ==
Puma was tested by Euro NCAP in 2019. It is rated at five stars. Adult and child protection is rated at 94 and 84%, respectively. Pedestrian safety is rated 77% by Euro NCAP. The organisation tested the Puma again in 2022, on that occasion giving it a four-star overall rating, with a 75% score in the adult-occupant category, an 84% score in the child-occupant category, a 70% score in the vulnerable-road-users category, and a 69% score in the safety-assist category. NCAP found that the Puma had "marginal" performance in protecting the chest of the driver in a frontal-offset collision, the chest of a rear-seat adult passenger in a full-width rigid barrier collision, and in protecting those seated in the front from whiplash injuries in a rear-end collision, with "poor" performance at preventing occupants' bodies from being thrown from side to side in an impact, while generally performing well in other areas for adult occupants. V also found protection for child occupants to be "good or adequate" in all of their tests. They also found the protection of struck pedestrians to be "good or adequate" in all areas except for the bottom of the windscreen and the A-pillars surrounding it, which were described as "stiff" and as having "poor" performance for head protection. NCAP rated the autonomous emergency-braking system's performance as "marginal" due to the characteristics of the front seats and head restraints in low-speed autonomous emergency-braking tests.

The car is available with pre-collision assist with pedestrian detection, emergency brake assist, tire-pressure monitoring system, electronic stability control, semi-autonomous parking assist, and emergency steering assist. The car also has adaptive cruise control. Other available features are autonomous emergency braking, intelligent speed limiter, and lane-keeping assist.

ANCAP test results Ford Puma all variants (2019, aligned with Euro NCAP)
Test	Points	%
Overall:	5 /5 stars	
Adult occupant:	36	92%
Child occupant:	42.5	86%
Pedestrian:	37.1	77%
Safety assist:	9.7	74%

Euro NCAP test results Ford Puma (2019)
Test	Points	%
Overall:	5 /5 stars	
Adult occupant:	36	94%
Child occupant:	41.5	84%
Pedestrian:	37.2	77%
Safety assist:	9.7	74%

== Reception ==
In January 2020, What Car? magazine awarded the Puma its Car of the Year title. In January 2021, the Puma 1.0 Ecoboost Hybrid 155 Titanium won What Car?'s Small SUV of the Year title. The same year, the Puma ST 1.5 Ecoboost 200 Performance Pack was named the magazine's Sports SUV of the Year. What Car? awarded the Puma five stars out of five in its review of the car.

In 2020, the Sunday Times found the "infotainment" system to be more difficult to operate than some competing Volkswagen Group products. They noted that the Puma has less rear-passenger space than those models, although they felt the large windows meant children were less likely to become motion sick riding in the back than in a Nissan Juke or Toyota C-HR. While they found the interior to be relatively quiet at speed, they found the ride quality to be somewhat inferior to some of its competitors. They noted the 456-litre (16.1 cu ft) boot as one of the largest in a crossover car sold at the time. The same publication also reviewed the ST model, saying they were "not sure why you'd want this over the 153bhp ST Line Puma" and noted "the uncomfortable seats and twitchy handling that make less sense in an SUV" while saying that the 31 miles per imperial gallon (9.1 L/100 km; 26 mpg_{‑US}) they averaged was "decent for a car that can hit 62mph from standstill in 6.7 sec." The Daily Telegraph found the physical buttons in the Titanium model they tested to be less distracting than touch-sensitive pads found in some other contemporary cars. Both newspapers praised the Puma's clutch and brakes, and noted the drainable "megabox" underneath the boot as a standout feature. Which? found changing radio stations to be "needlessly complex" and found the Puma to be reliable in surveys, with one-in-fifty Pumas under four years old breaking down in the time frame studied.

== Ford Puma Rally1 ==
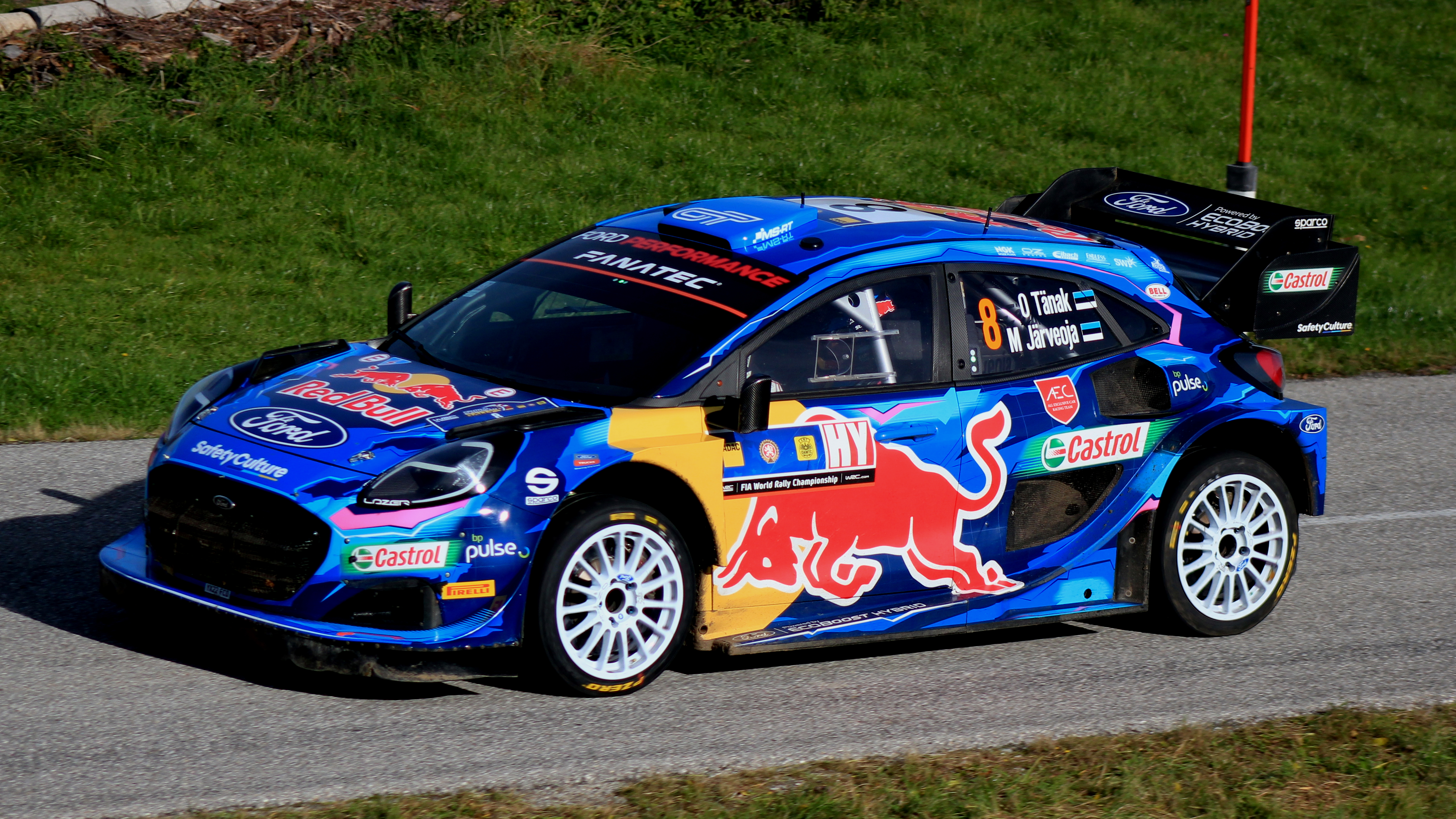
The Ford Puma Rally1

A Group Rally1 car, named Ford Puma Rally1, has been competing in the World Rally Championship since 2022. It is based upon the road car version of Ford Puma crossover, and was developed for the purpose of replacing the Ford Fiesta WRC, which competed between 2017 and 2021. The car was revealed at the 2021 Goodwood Festival of Speed.

== Sales ==
In 2021, the Ford Puma became the best-selling Ford model in the UK, surpassing the Ford Fiesta. Its high sales figures also resulted in it being the overall eighth-best selling car in the UK in 2021, having achieved 28,697 new registrations throughout the year. The Puma became the fourth-best selling car in the UK in 2022 and the best-selling car in the UK in 2023, 2024, and 2025 as well as the eighth-best selling car in Europe for 2023.

Year	Europe	Turkey	Australia	South Africa
2019	337			
2020	118,180		597	
2021	134,431		3,218	
2022	136,956		2,408	
2023	159,704		2,027	368
2024	149,112	8,866	847	873
2025	141,423			
