= Ford Fiesta (seventh generation) =

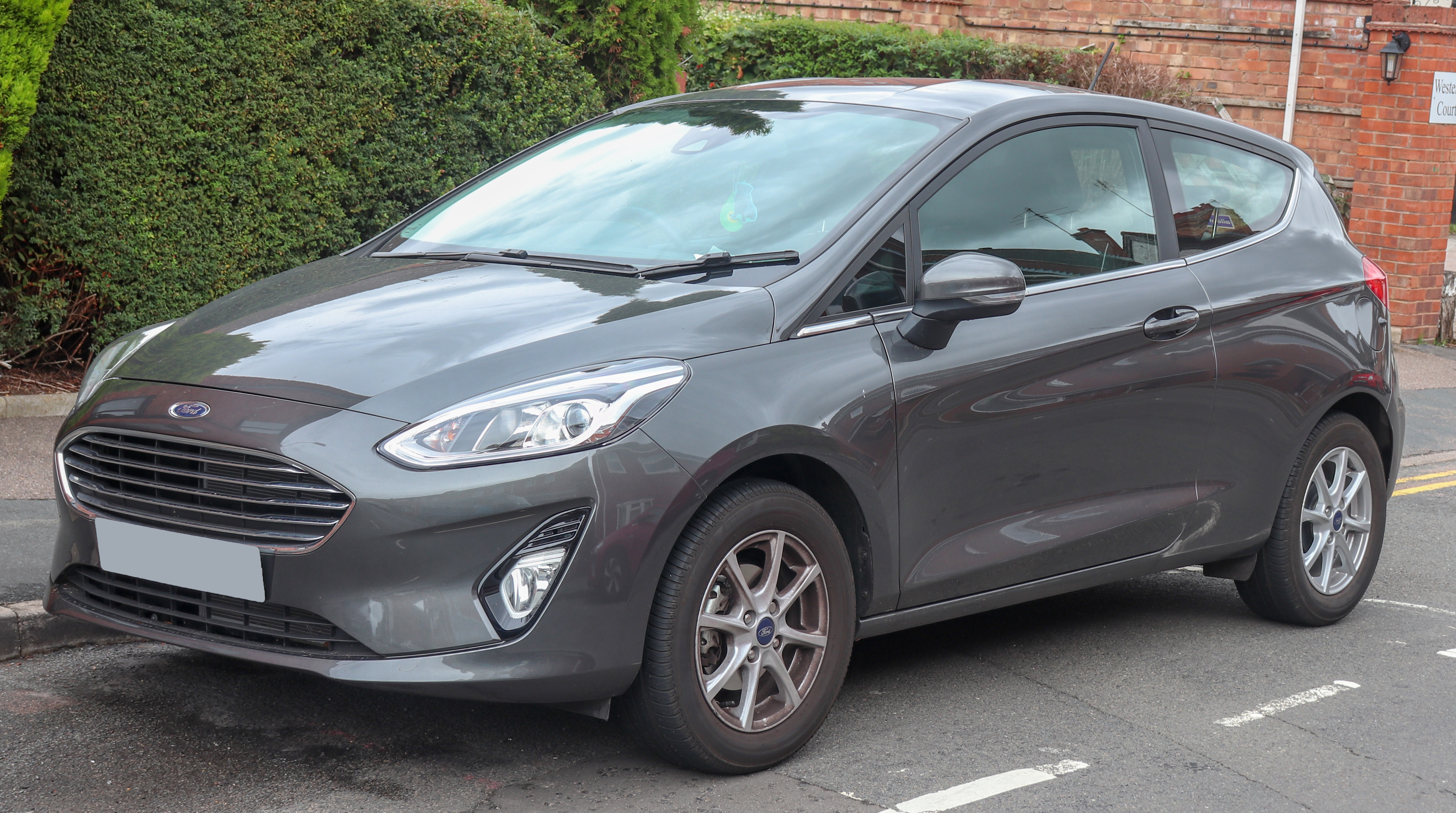

Overview
- Manufacturer: Ford
- Production: 2017 – July 2023
- Assembly: Germany: Cologne (CB&A)
- Designer: Ivan Telesca

Body and chassis
- Class: Supermini (B)
- Body style: 3/5-door hatchback
- Platform: Ford global B-car platform
- Related: Ford Puma (crossover)

Powertrain
- Engine: Petrol: 1.0 L Ecoboost (Fox) turbo I3; 1.0 L EcoBoost Hybrid Fox mHEV mild hybrid turbo I3; 1.1 L Duratec Ti-VCT I3; 1.5 L Ecoboost (Dragon) turbo I3; Diesel: 1.5 L DLD-415 turbo I4
- Electric motor: 11.5 kW (15.4 hp) belt-driven integrated starter/generator (BISG)
- Transmission: 5-speed IB5 manual; 6-speed B6+ manual (ST); 6-speed automatic; 7-speed Powershift DCT
- Hybrid drivetrain: EcoBoost Hybrid mHEV
- Battery: 0.48 kWh, 48-volt battery pack (mild hybrid)

Dimensions
- Wheelbase: 2,493 mm (98.1 in)
- Length: 4,040–4,068 mm (159.1–160.2 in)
- Width: 1,734–1,783 mm (68.3–70.2 in)
- Height: 1,483–1,498 mm (58.4–59.0 in)
- Curb weight: 1,113–1,207 kg (2,454–2,661 lb)

Chronology
- Predecessor: Ford Fiesta (sixth generation)

The Ford Fiesta Mk7 (Mk8 in the United Kingdom) is the seventh and last generation of the Ford Fiesta supermini. Originally introduced in 2016, it was available in both 3-door hatchback and panel van derivatives. In 2018, the Fiesta ST was released. The model underwent a facelift in 2022.

== Production ==
On November 29, 2016, the seventh-generation Fiesta (Mark VII, or Mark VIII in UK) was announced in Germany, being bigger, roomier, safer, more efficient, and more upmarket. The Fiesta range expanded to include new additions - a crossover-styled variant called the Fiesta Active, and the luxury Fiesta Vignale.

Unlike previous generations, the Fiesta has been phased out from North America, South America, Australasia (except for ST versions), and Asia. However, the Ford Fiesta ST continued to be sold in Australia due to popularity.

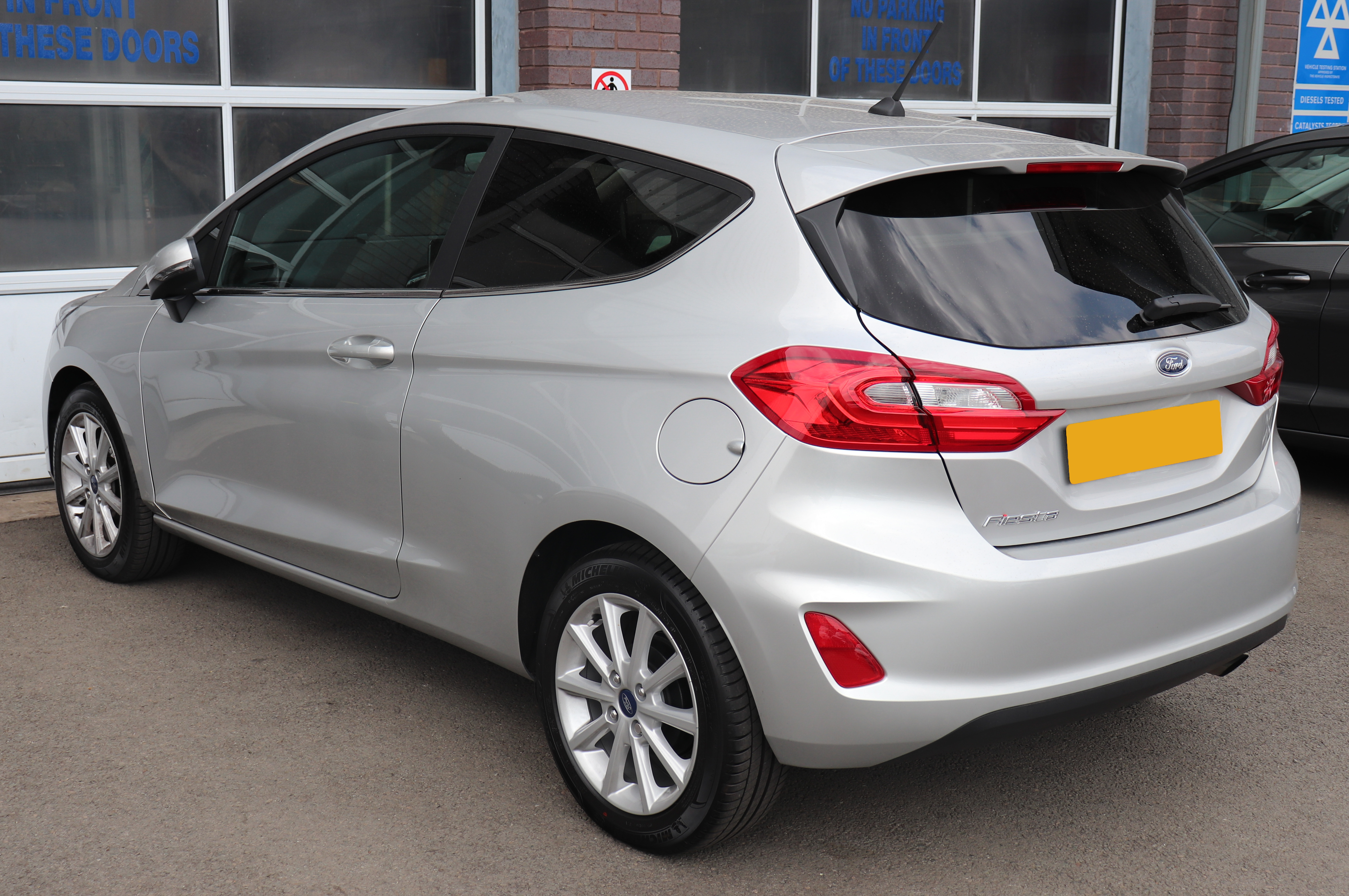
Rear view (three-door)

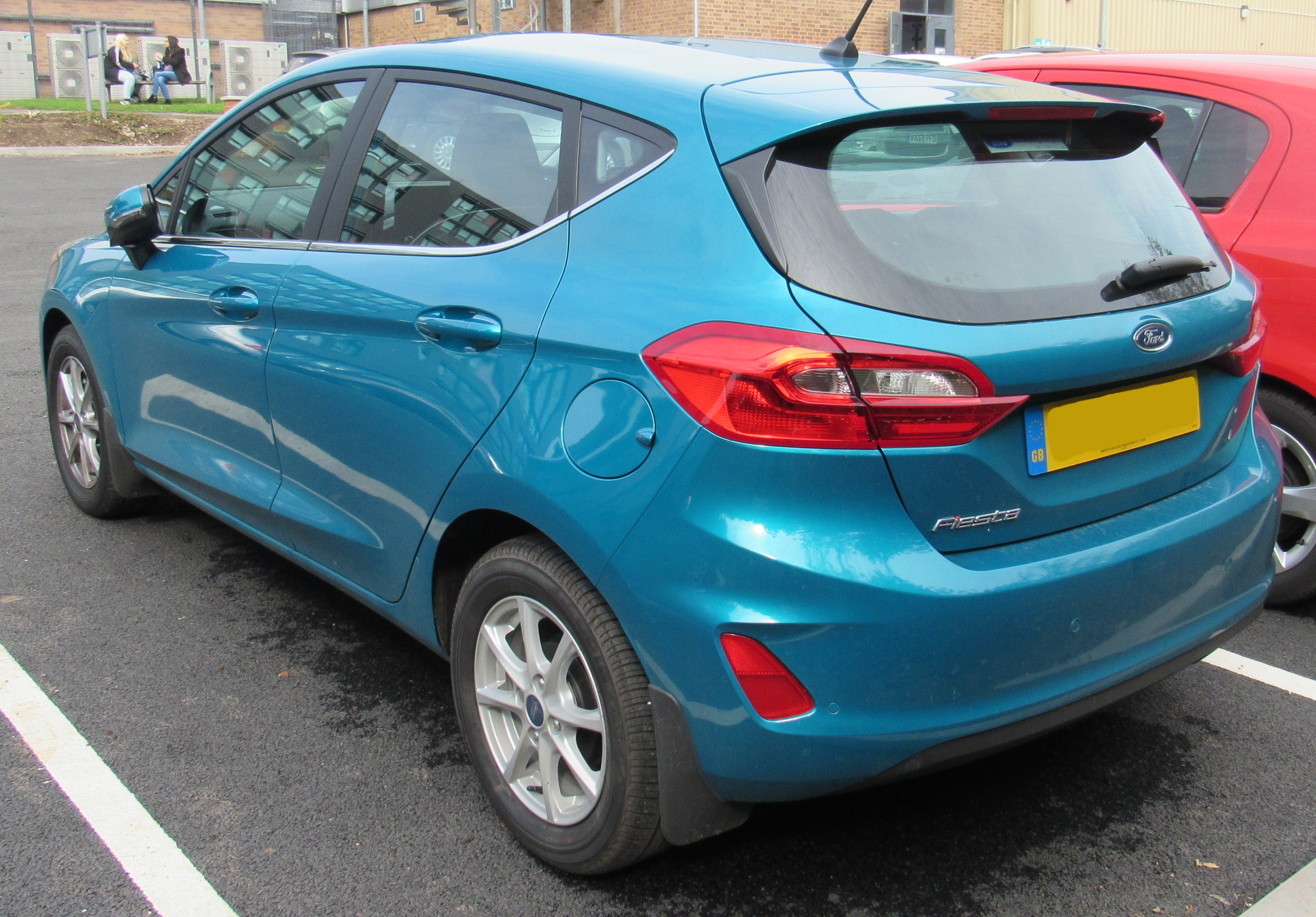
Rear view (five-door)

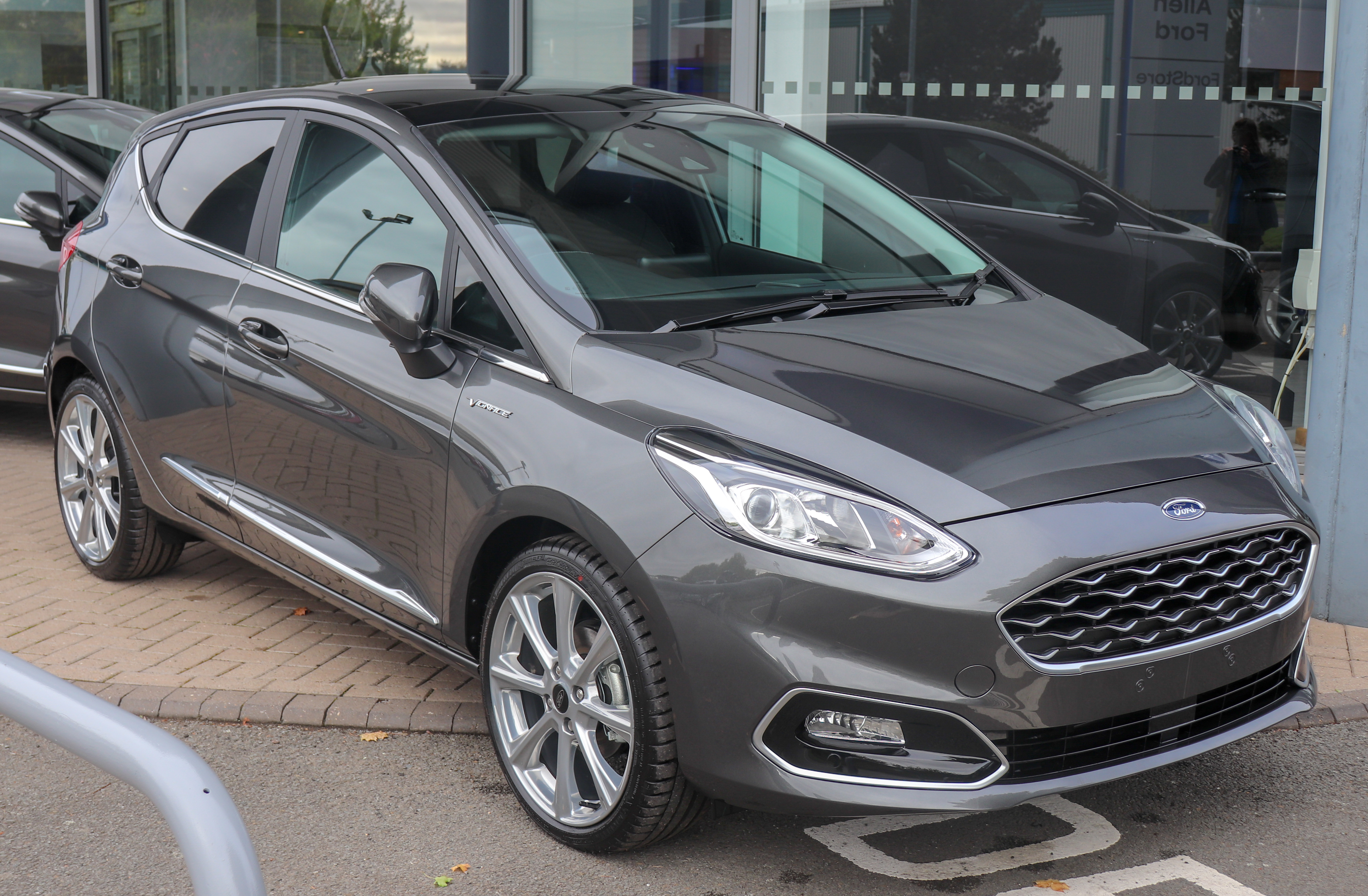
2018 Ford Fiesta Vignale

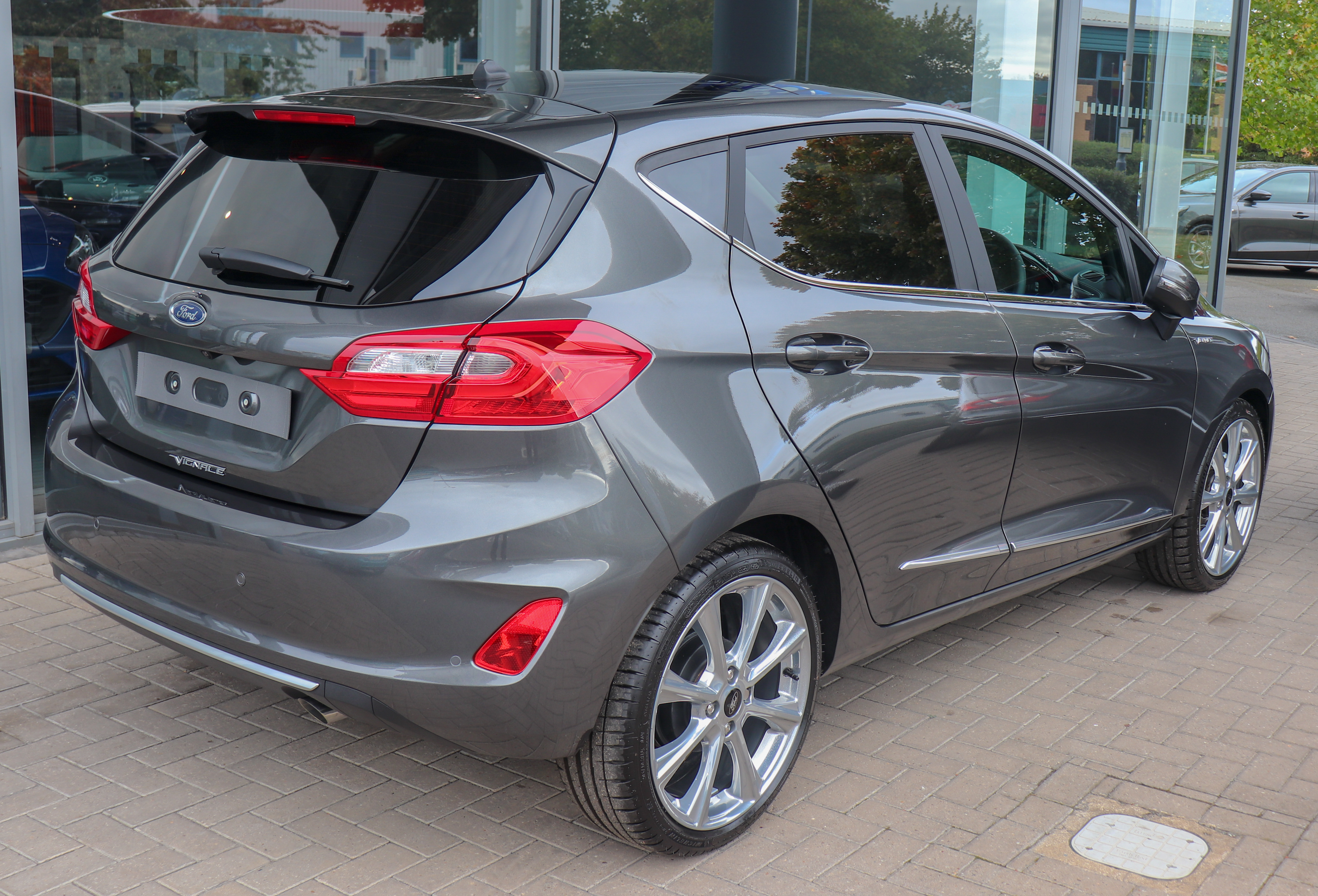
2018 Ford Fiesta Vignale

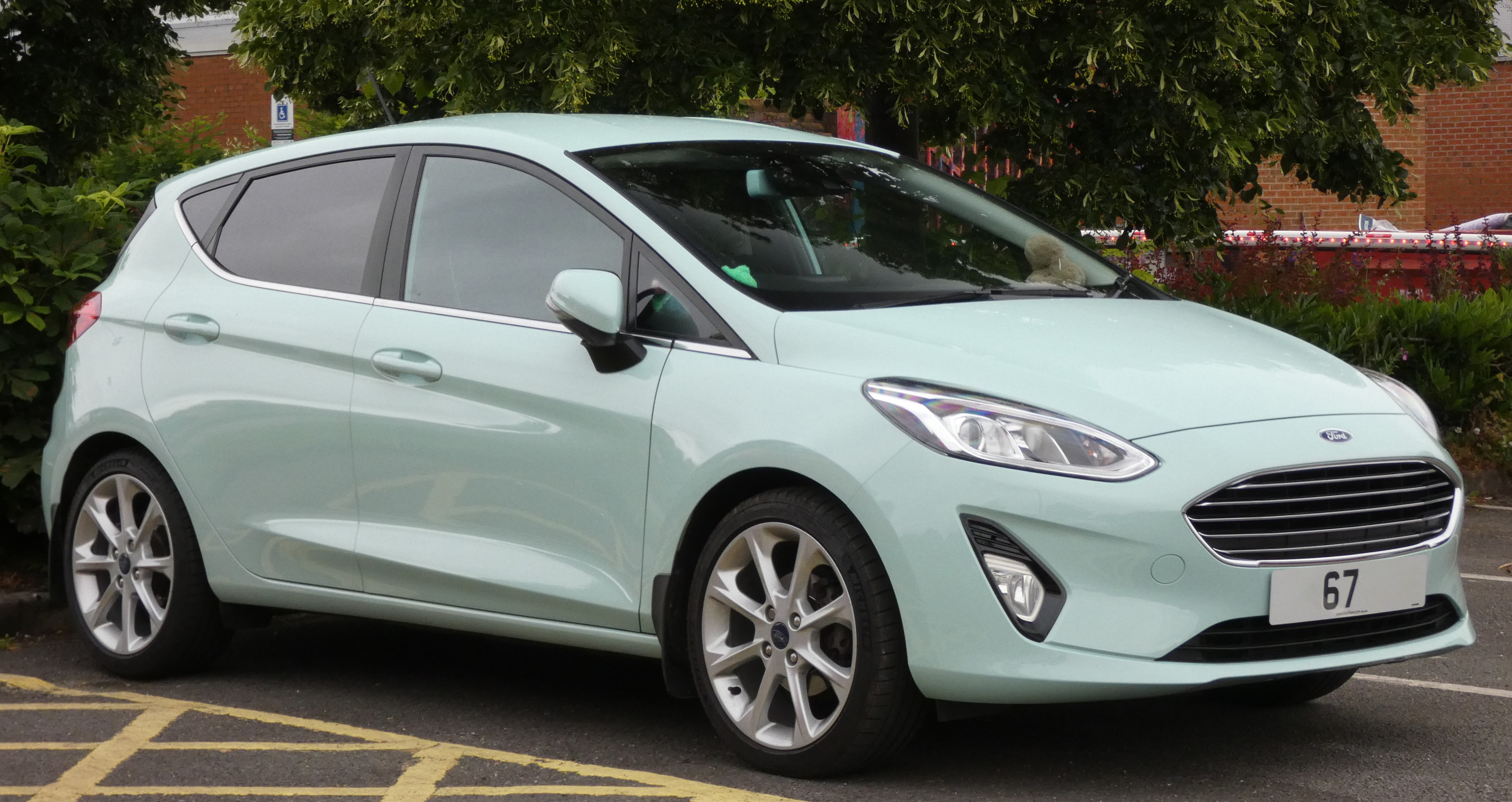
2017 Ford Fiesta B&O Play Edition

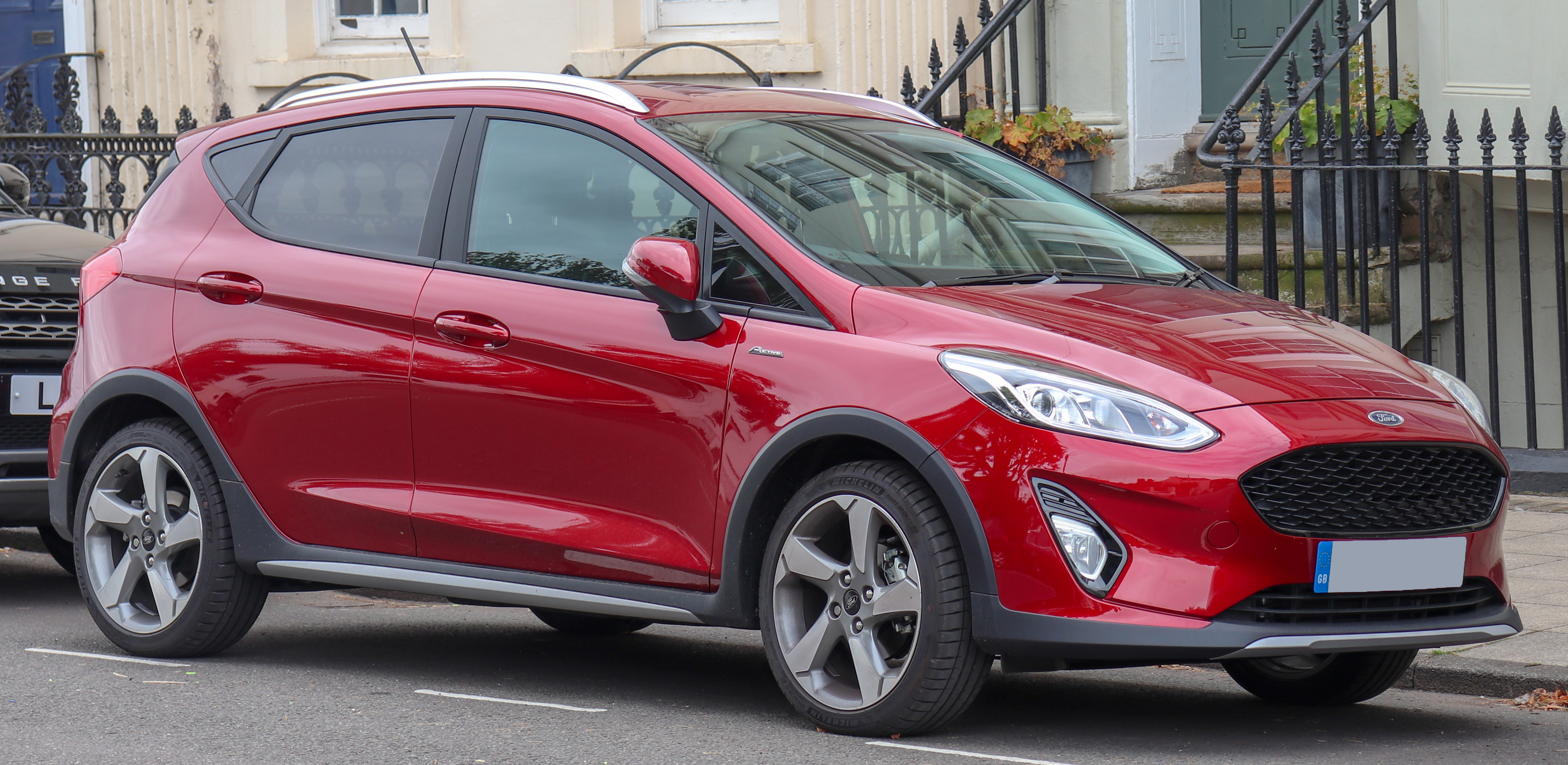
2018 Ford Fiesta Active X

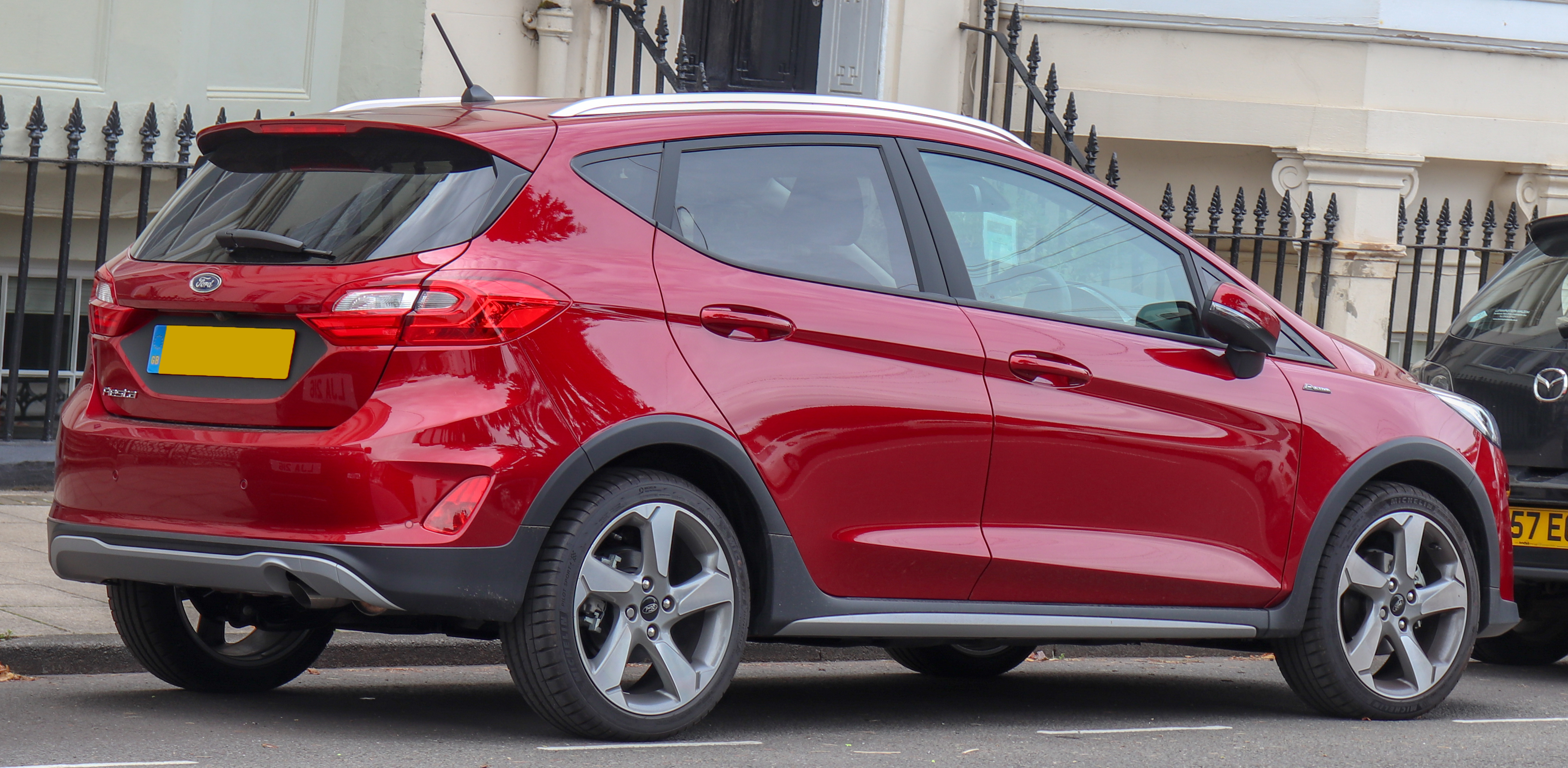
2018 Ford Fiesta Active X

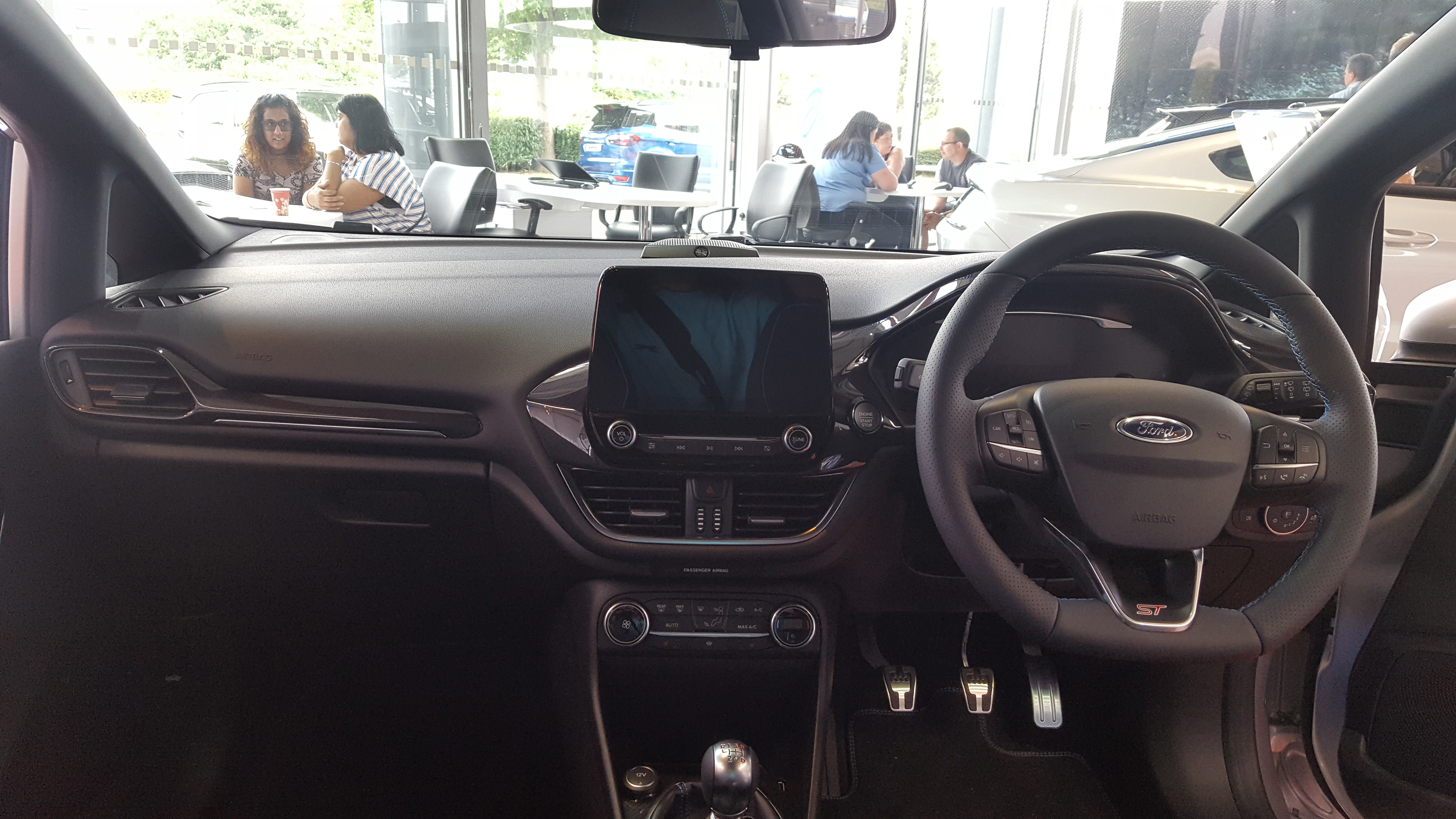
Interior

== Safety ==
The Fiesta in its standard European market configuration received 5 stars from Euro NCAP in 2017.

== Fiesta ST (2018–2023) ==
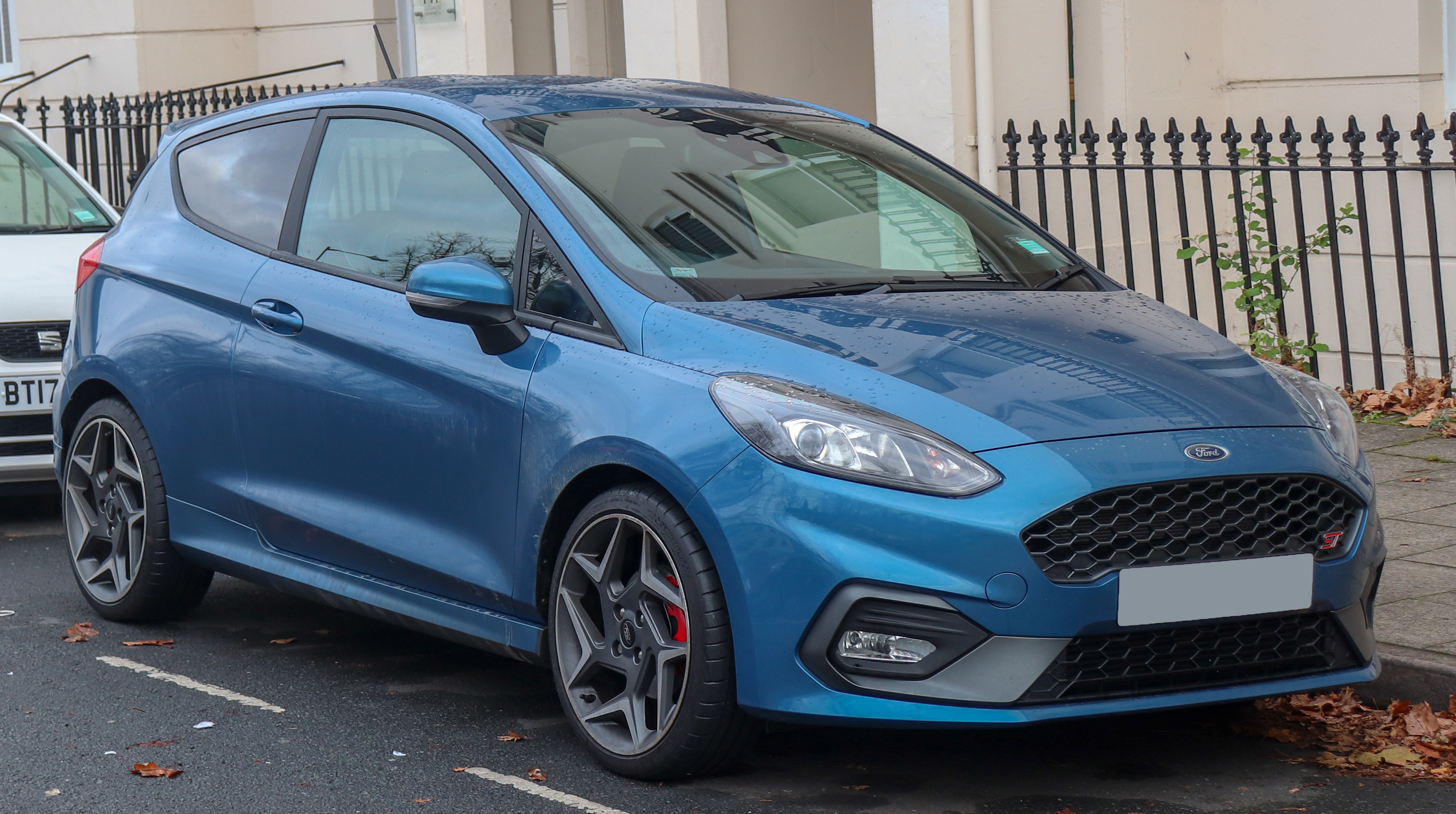

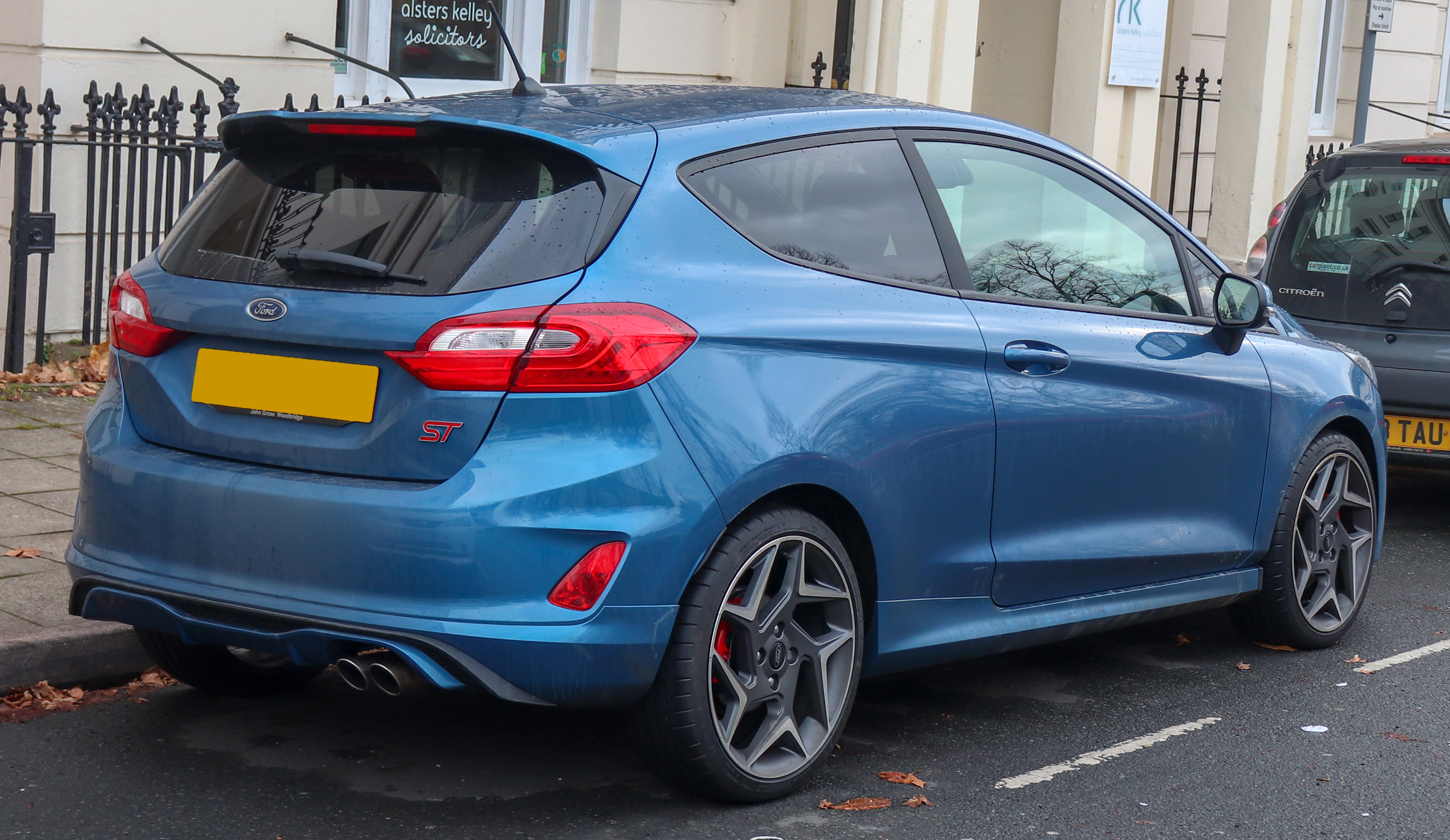
Ford Fiesta ST-3 Turbo 3-door

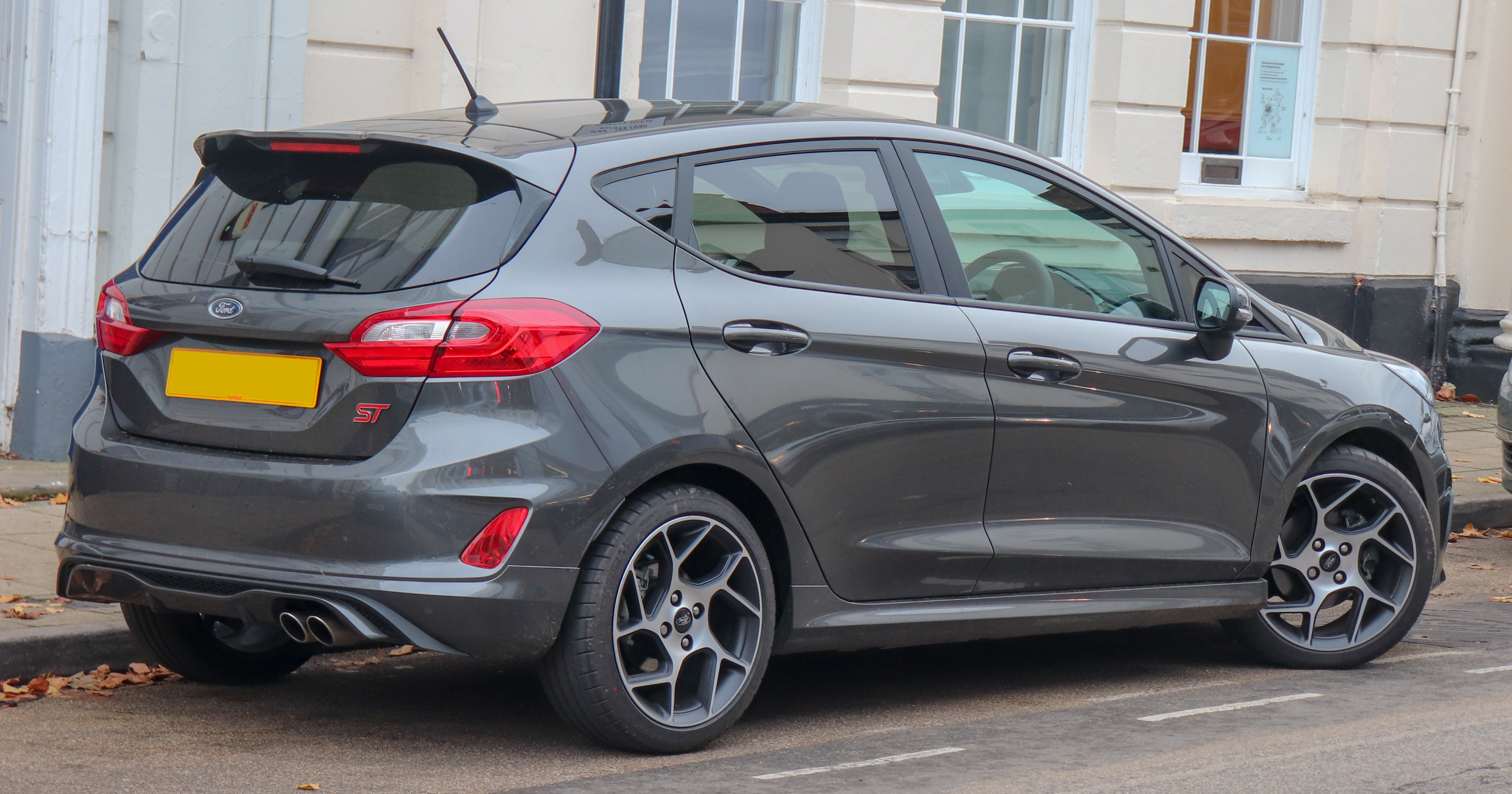
Ford Fiesta ST-2 Turbo 5-door

On February 24, 2017, the seventh-generation Fiesta ST was announced in Europe. It features an all-new 200 PS three-cylinder, 1.5-litre Ecoboost engine with turbocharger and cylinder deactivation technology. On March 12, 2018, Ford announced that a limited-slip differential would be offered for the first time on the Fiesta ST as an optional extra. The Fiesta ST was released on May 7, 2018. It is heavier than the previous ST model, and can go from zero to 62 mph (100 km/h) in 6.5 seconds. The power and torque outputs are 197 bhp (200 PS) and 290 N⋅m (214 lbf⋅ft) respectively, which match the figures of the limited-edition Fiesta ST200 of the previous generation. It is produced in either a three-door or five-door body style, and is fitted with a six-speed manual gearbox, with no option of an automatic. The Ford Fiesta ST won Top Gear's Hot Hatch and Car of the Year for 2018.

In April 2019, Ford announced a new limited-edition model to the ST range called the "Performance Edition". Although named "Performance", the Fiesta ST does not gain any power upgrades to the standard ST. The car is based on the ST-3 model and comes with multiple options that would normally be a cost option to an ST, such as LED headlights, B&O sound system, and Performance Pack. To differentiate the Performance Edition, the car comes with exclusive options, namely standard Deep Orange paint, adjustable coilover suspension, and lighter multispoke alloy wheels.

== 2022 facelift ==
In September 2021, Ford announced and released images of the facelifted Ford Fiesta, and Fiesta ST due to be released at the beginning of 2022. The new models come with a new front bumper, other visual modifications and a new 'Wrong Way Alert' safety feature over the previous model. The higher specification models also include increased torque, matrix LED headlights and upgraded technology like a fully digital instrument binnacle.

The 3-door Fiesta was discontinued during spring 2022. Due to being derived from the 3-door version, the Fiesta Van was also discontinued as well.

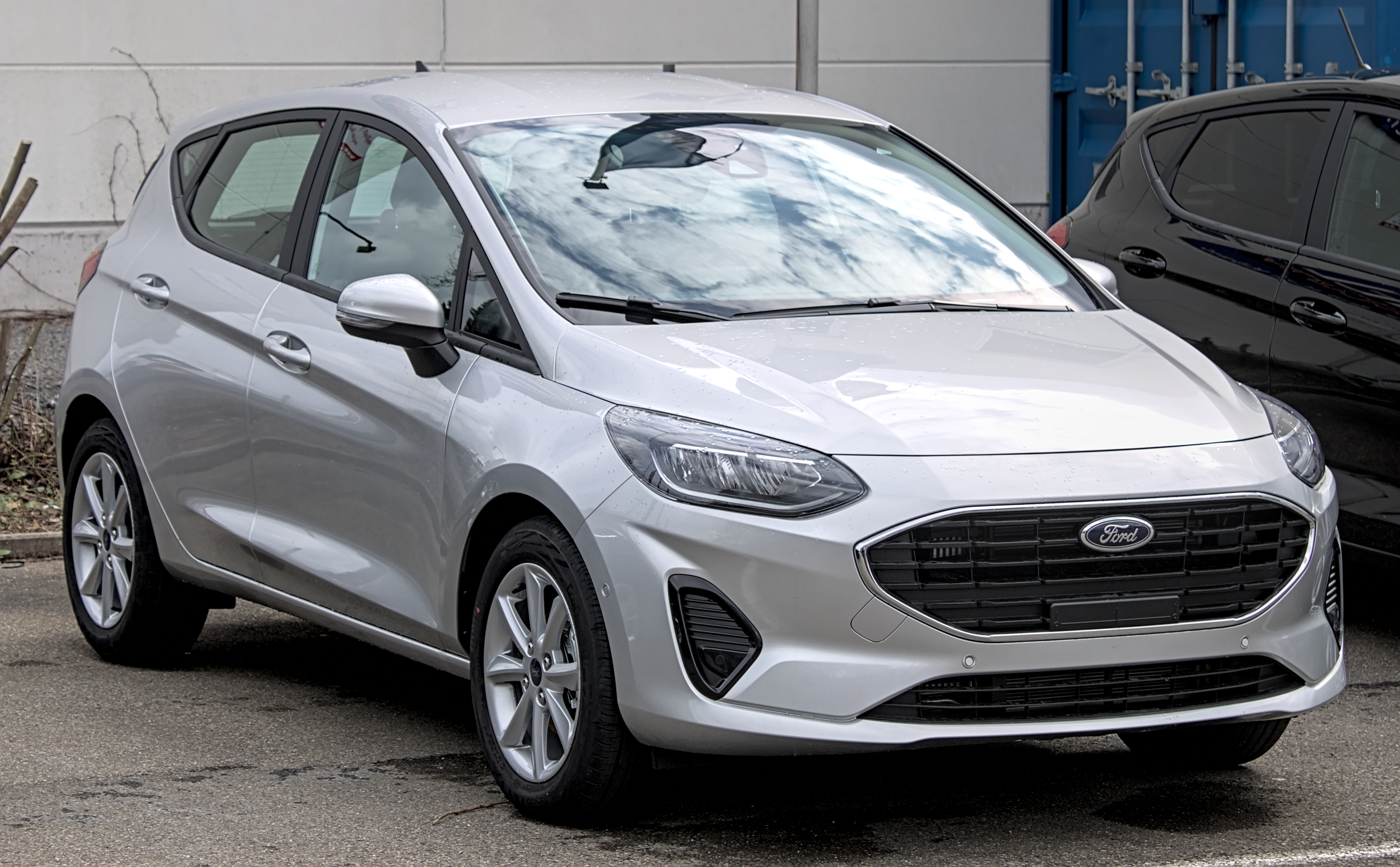
2022 Ford Fiesta (facelift)

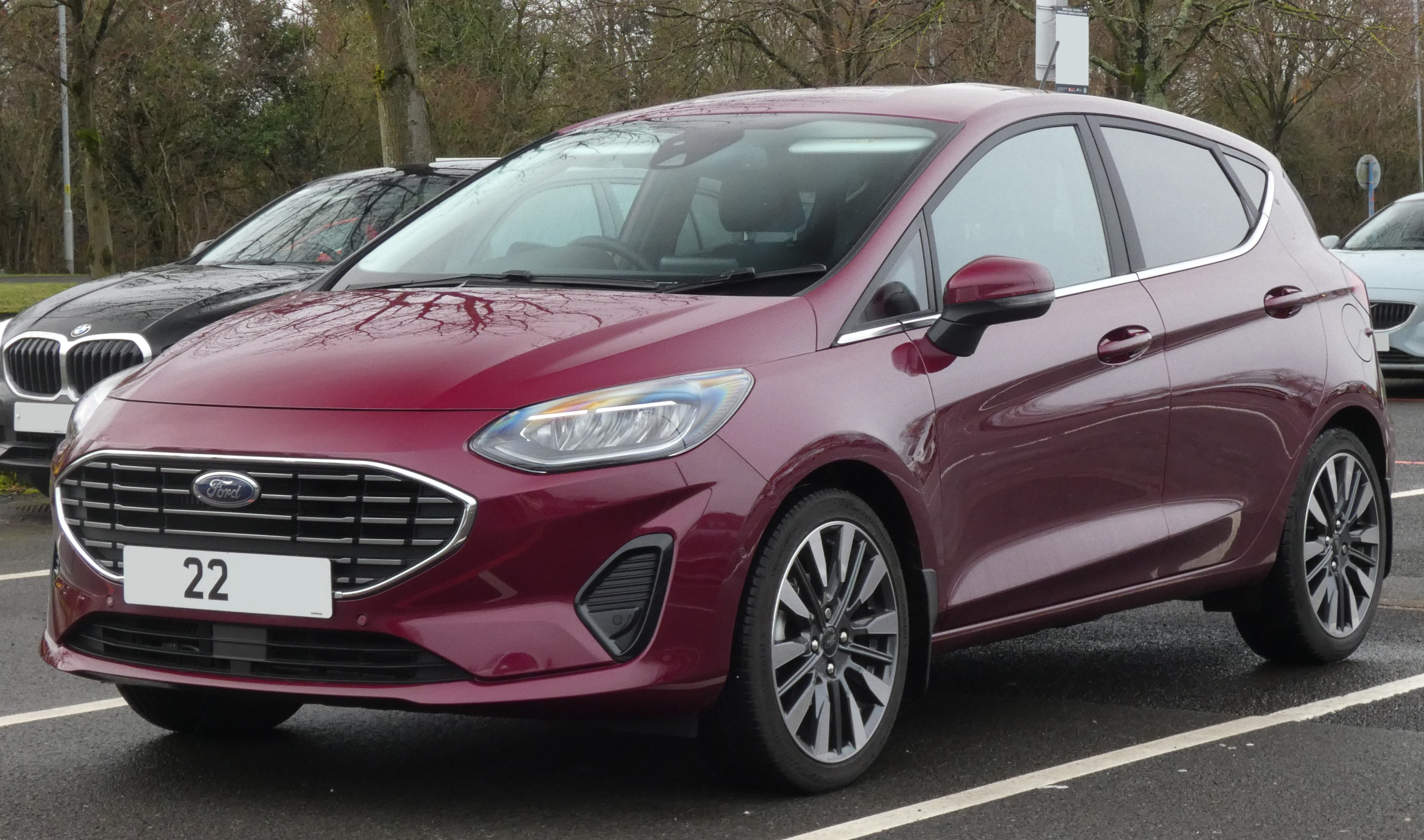
2022 Ford Fiesta Vignale (facelift)

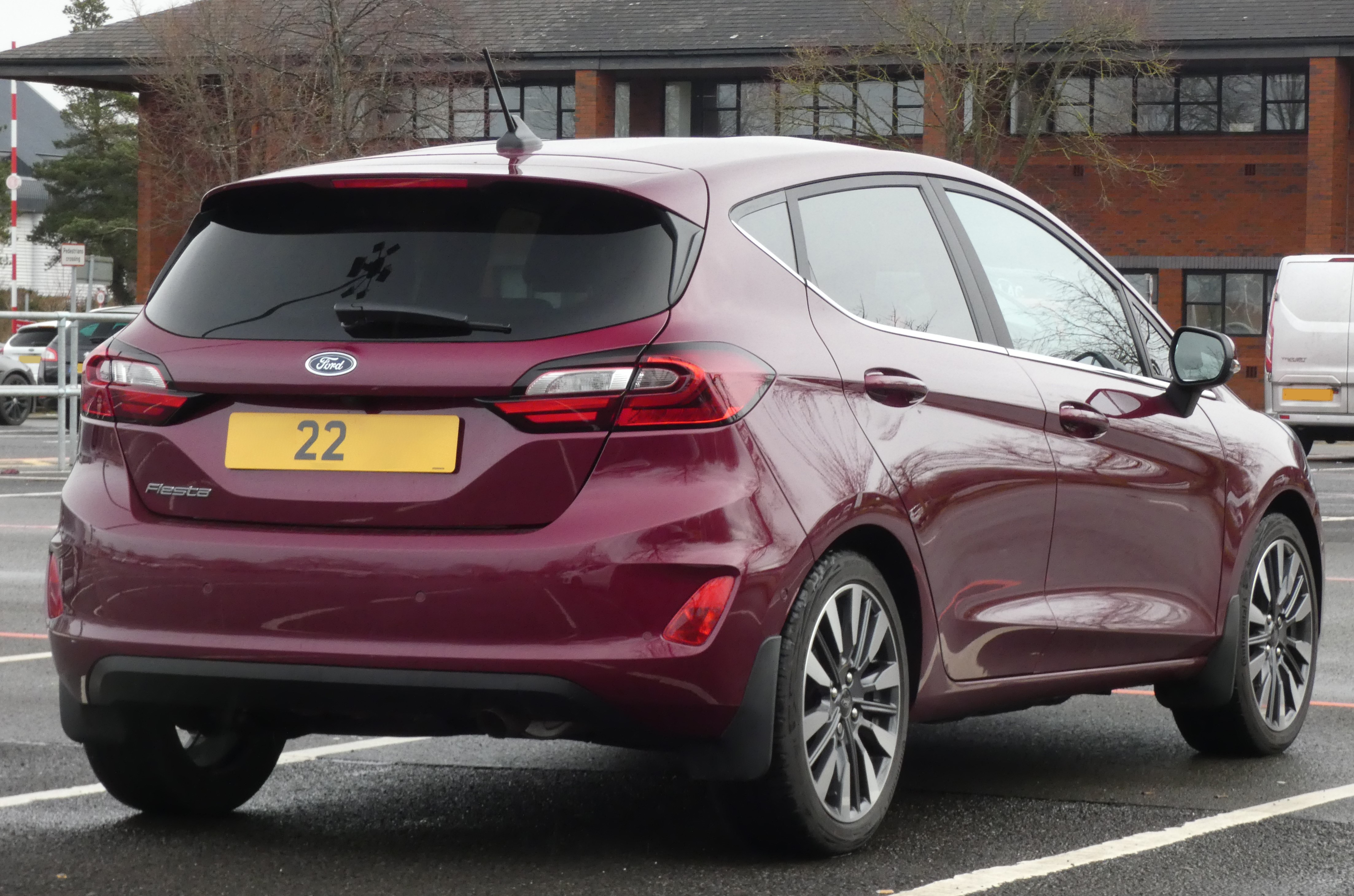
2022 Ford Fiesta Vignale (facelift)

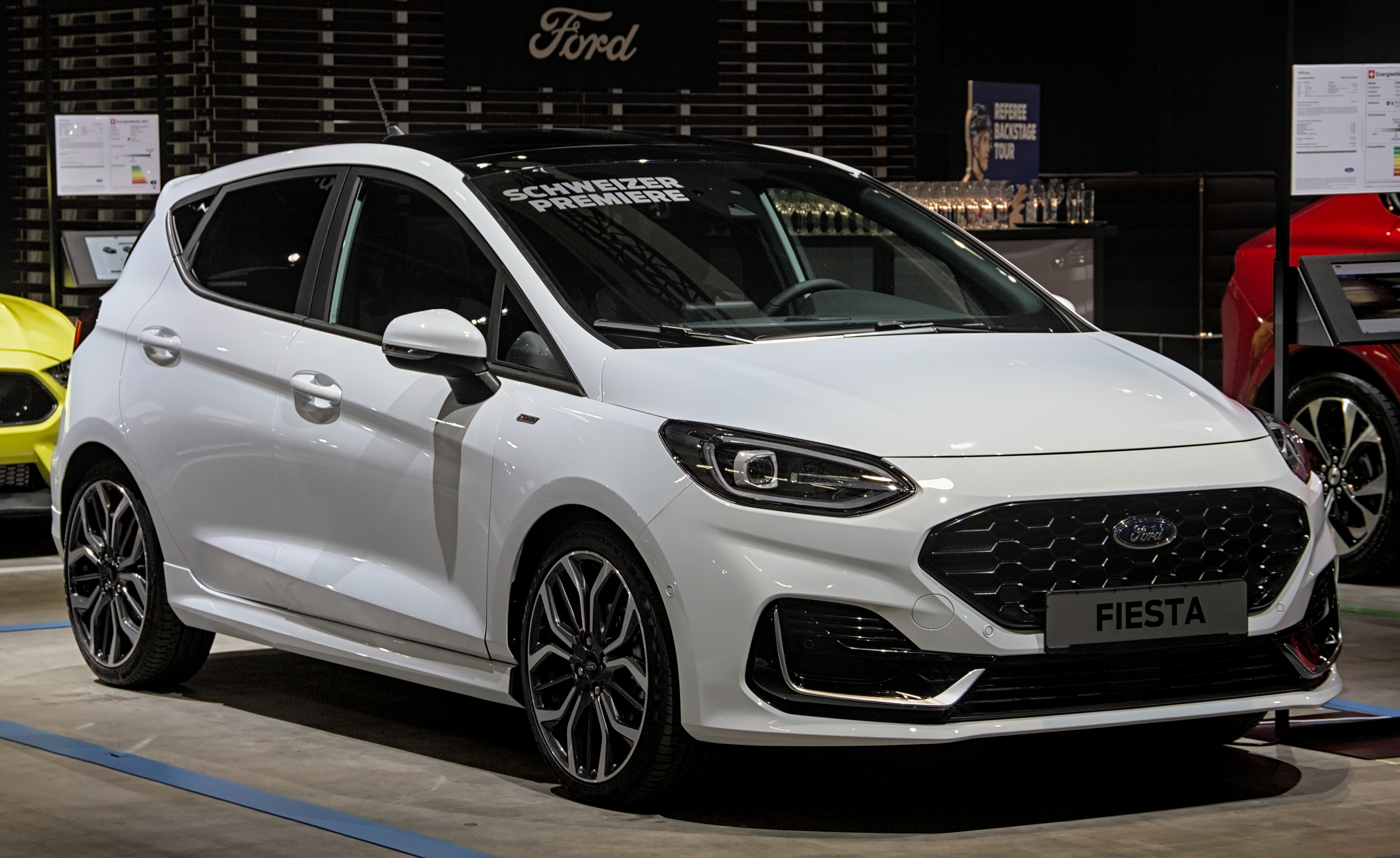
2021 Ford Fiesta ST-Line (facelift)

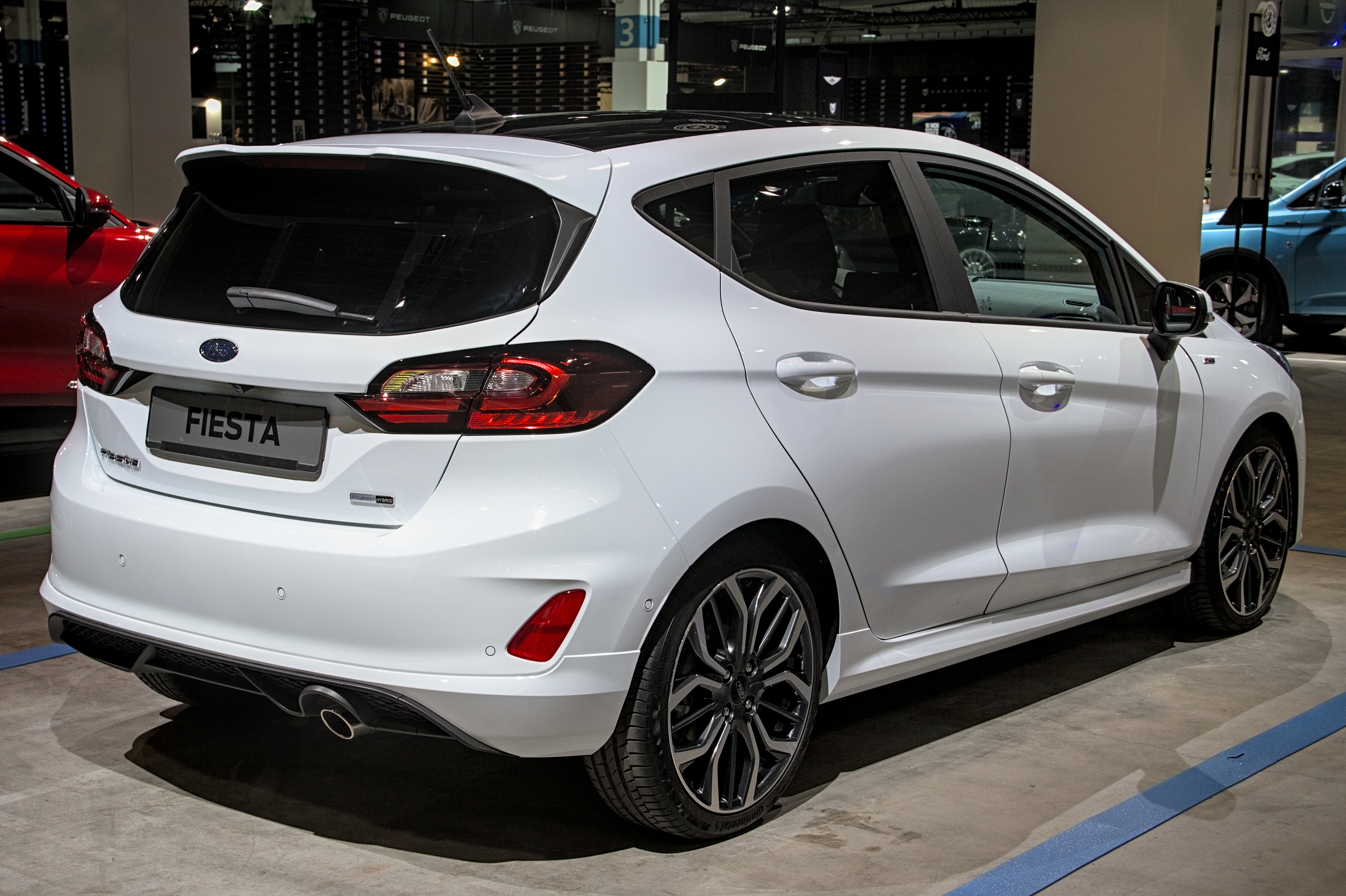
2021 Ford Fiesta ST-Line (facelift)

== Powertrain ==
Model	Years	Type	Power, torque	CO_{2} (NEDC)	CO_{2} (WLTP)
Petrol engines
1.1 L Ti-VCT 70 PS	2017-2020	1,117 cc (68.2 cu in) I3	70 PS (51 kW; 69 bhp), 108 N⋅m (80 lb⋅ft)	101 g/km	115 g/km
1.1 L Ti-VCT 85 PS	2017-2023	1,117 cc (68.2 cu in) I3	85 PS (63 kW; 84 bhp), 108 N⋅m (80 lb⋅ft)	101 g/km	114 g/km
1.0 L EcoBoost 100 PS	2017-2020	998 cc (60.9 cu in) Turbo I3	100 PS (74 kW; 99 bhp), 170 N⋅m (125 lbf⋅ft)	97 g/km	107 g/km
1.0 L EcoBoost 125 PS	2017-2023	998 cc (60.9 cu in) Turbo I3	125 PS (92 kW; 123 bhp), 170 N⋅m (125 lbf⋅ft)	98 g/km	107 g/km
1.0 L EcoBoost 140 PS	2017-2020	998 cc (60.9 cu in) Turbo I3	140 PS (103 kW; 138 bhp), 180 N⋅m (133 lbf⋅ft)	102 g/km	112 g/km
1.0 L EcoBoost 155 PS	2020-2023	998 cc (60.9 cu in) Turbo I3	155 PS (114 kW; 153 bhp), 220 N⋅m (162 lbf⋅ft)	N/A	113 g/km
1.5 L EcoBoost 200 PS	2018-2022	1,497 cc (91.4 cu in) Turbo I3	200 PS (147 kW; 197 bhp), 290 N⋅m (214 lbf⋅ft)	≈114 g/km	136 g/km
1.5 L EcoBoost 200 PS	2022-2023	1,497 cc (91.4 cu in) Turbo I3	200 PS (147 kW; 197 bhp), 320 N⋅m (236 lbf⋅ft)	N/A	151 g/km
Diesel engines
1.5 L Duratorq TDCi 85 PS	2017-2023	1,498 cc (91.4 cu in) I4	85 PS (63 kW; 84 bhp), 215 N⋅m (159 lb⋅ft)	84 g/km	97 g/km
1.5 L Duratorq TDCi 120 PS	2017-2023	1,498 cc (91.4 cu in) I4	120 PS (88 kW; 118 bhp), 270 N⋅m (199 lbf⋅ft)	89 g/km	107 g/km

== Marketing ==
On July 20, 2017, Ford UK released an advertisement of the Fiesta featuring actress Keeley Hawes.

== Discontinuation ==
Ford executives in October 2022 announced that the Fiesta was set to be discontinued by mid-2023, due to the rising cost of parts and drivers opting for SUVs, and the company wanting to focus on electrification of its vehicles.

The final Fiesta was produced on July 7, 2023, with the last two cars destined for Ford's heritage fleets; one in Germany and one in the UK.
