= Ford Global B-car Platform =

Ford B3 platform
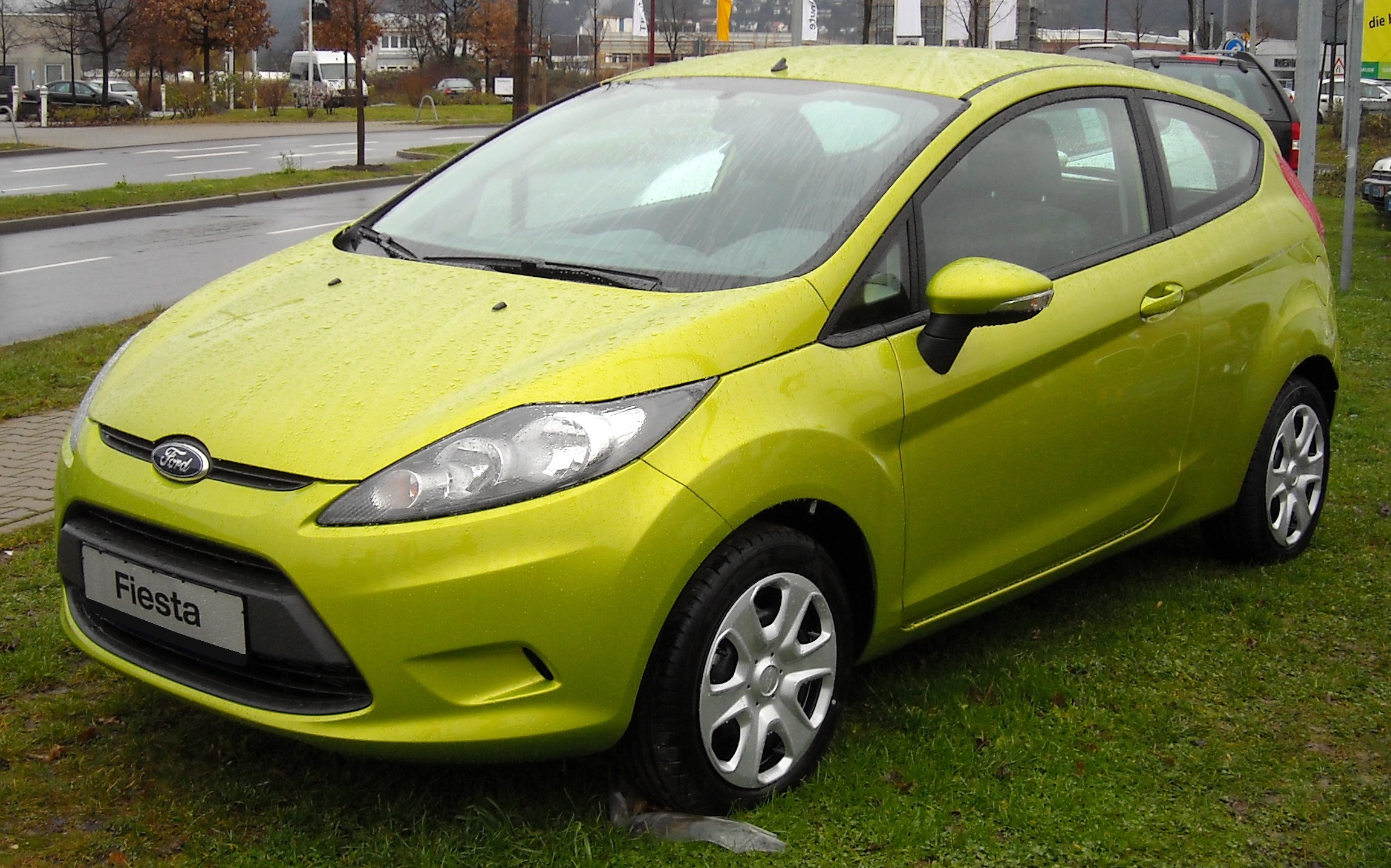

Overview
- Manufacturer: Ford Motor Company
- Also called: Ford B2E platform Mazda DY platform Mazda DE platform
- Production: 2002–present

Body and chassis
- Class: Subcompact platform (B)

Chronology
- Predecessor: Ford B platform Mazda D platform

The Ford global B-car platform (for "B-class") is a subcompact automobile platform that is jointly developed by Ford Motor Company and Mazda Motor Corporation at centers in Europe as well as North America and Australia. Previously, Ford has used the Mazda-engineered D platform for its B-segment Ford Festiva (hatchback). This new global B-platform project was initiated by Ford in Dearborn, Michigan, United States and is equipped with front MacPherson strut and twist-beam rear suspension. The front suspension arms (wishbone) are attached to a pressed-steel welded subframe, which is directly bolted onto the bodyshell. The design is made to accommodate diverse engine options.

== B3 ==
The first iteration of this platform was known as the B3. Vehicles utilising this platform include:

- Ford Fiesta Mk5 (2002–2008)
- Ford Figo (2010–2015)
- Ford Fusion (2002–2012)
- Ford Ikon (2007–2015)
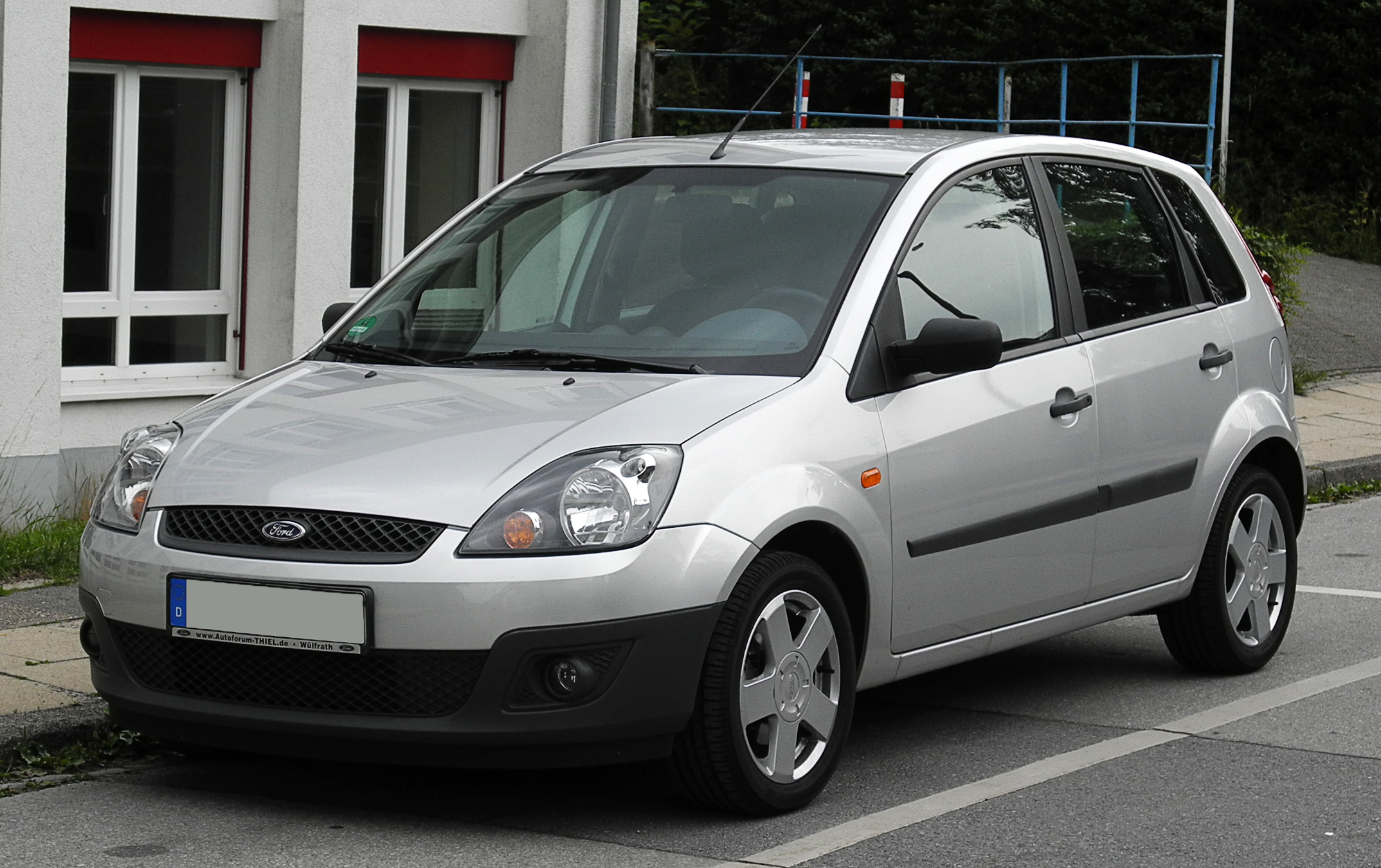
Ford Fiesta MK5

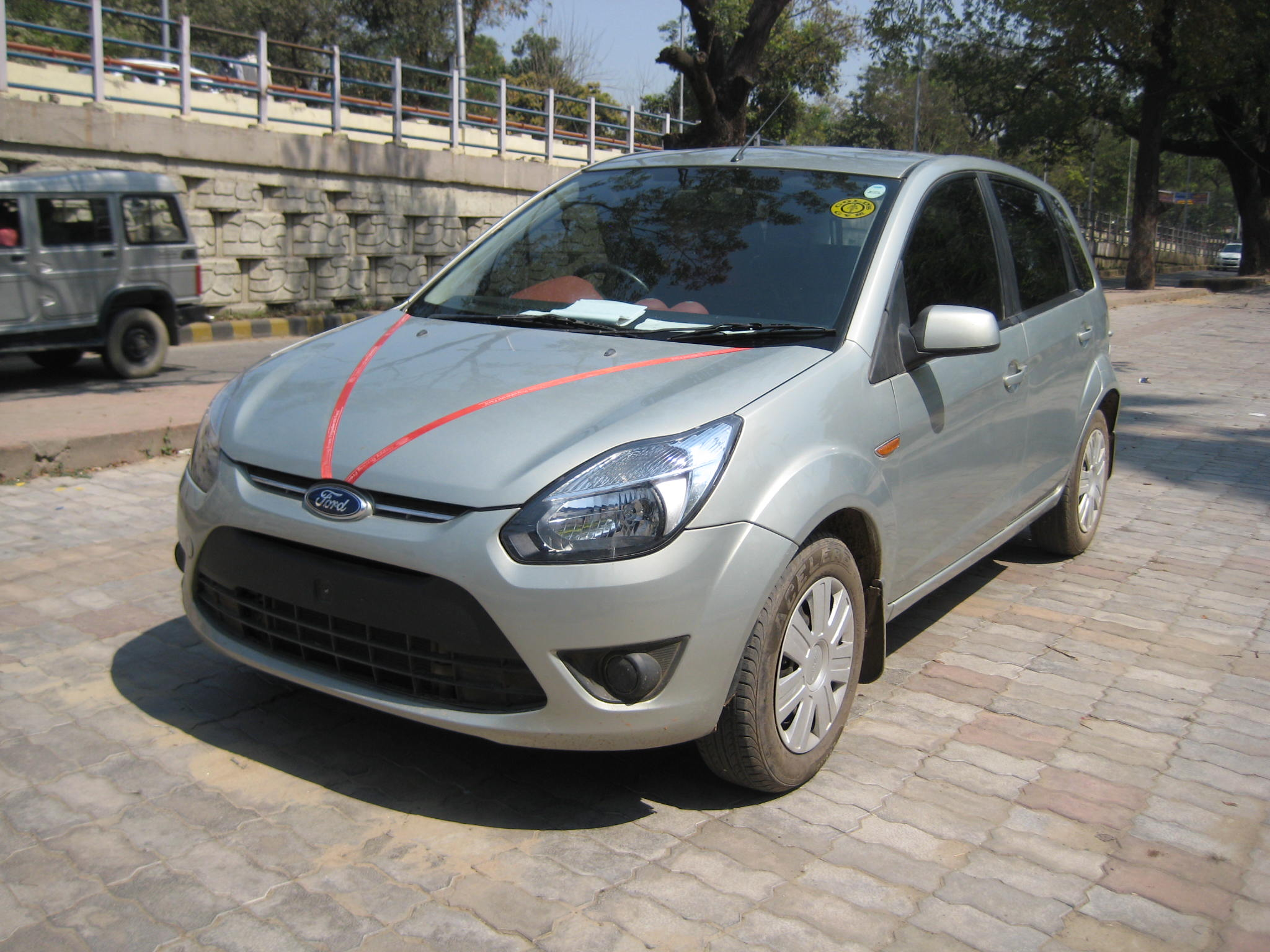
Ford Figo

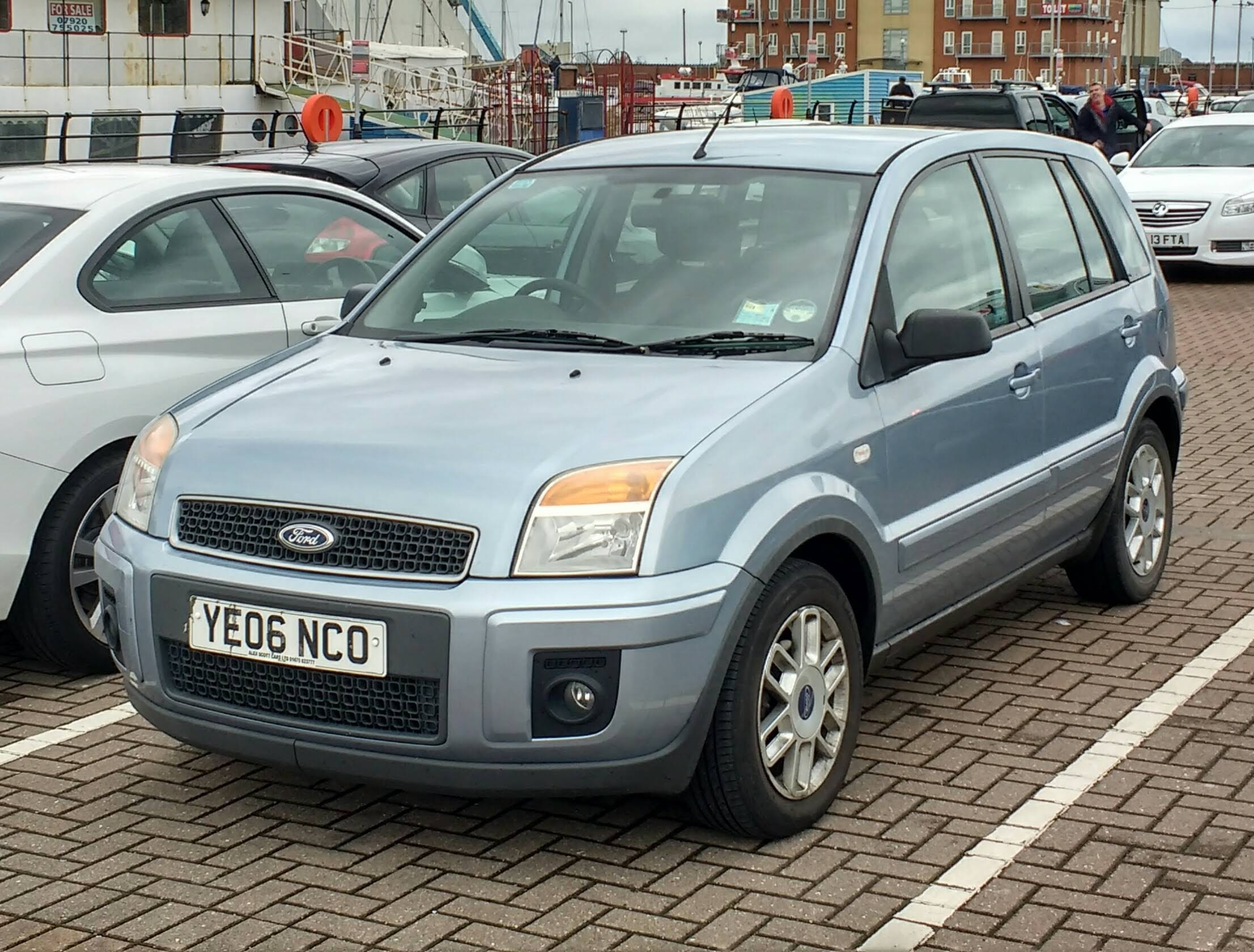
Ford Fusion

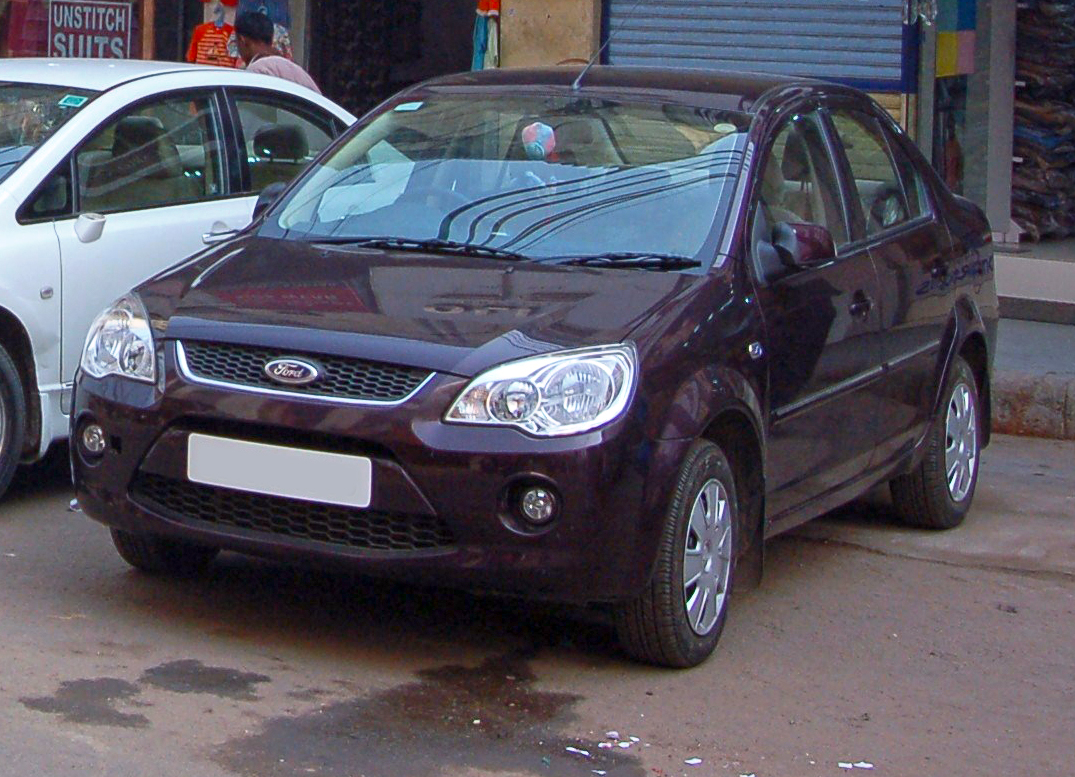
Ford Ikon

=== Mazda D Platform ===
- Mazda Demio/Mazda2 (2002–2007)
- Mazda Verisa (2004–2015)
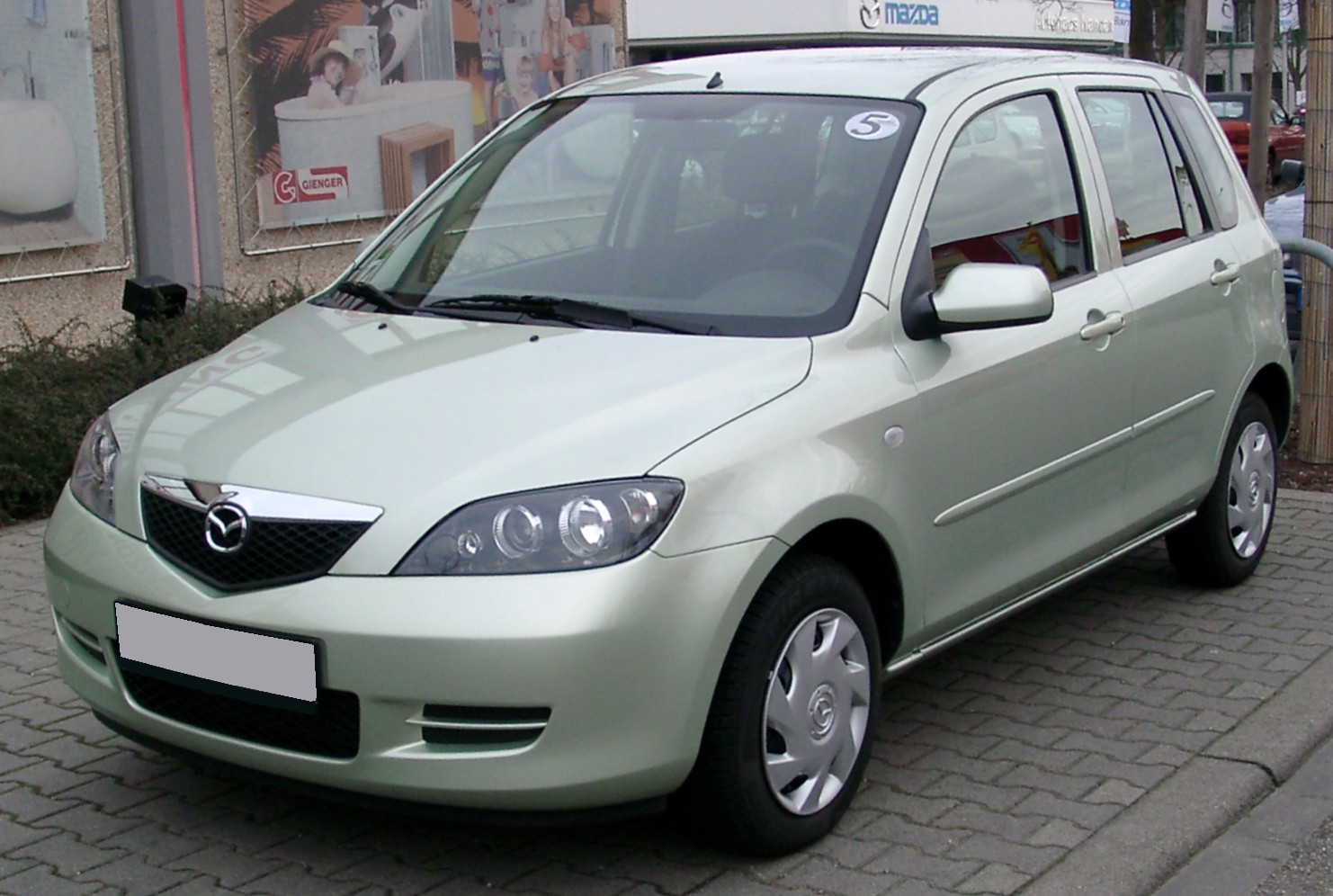
Mazda Demio/2

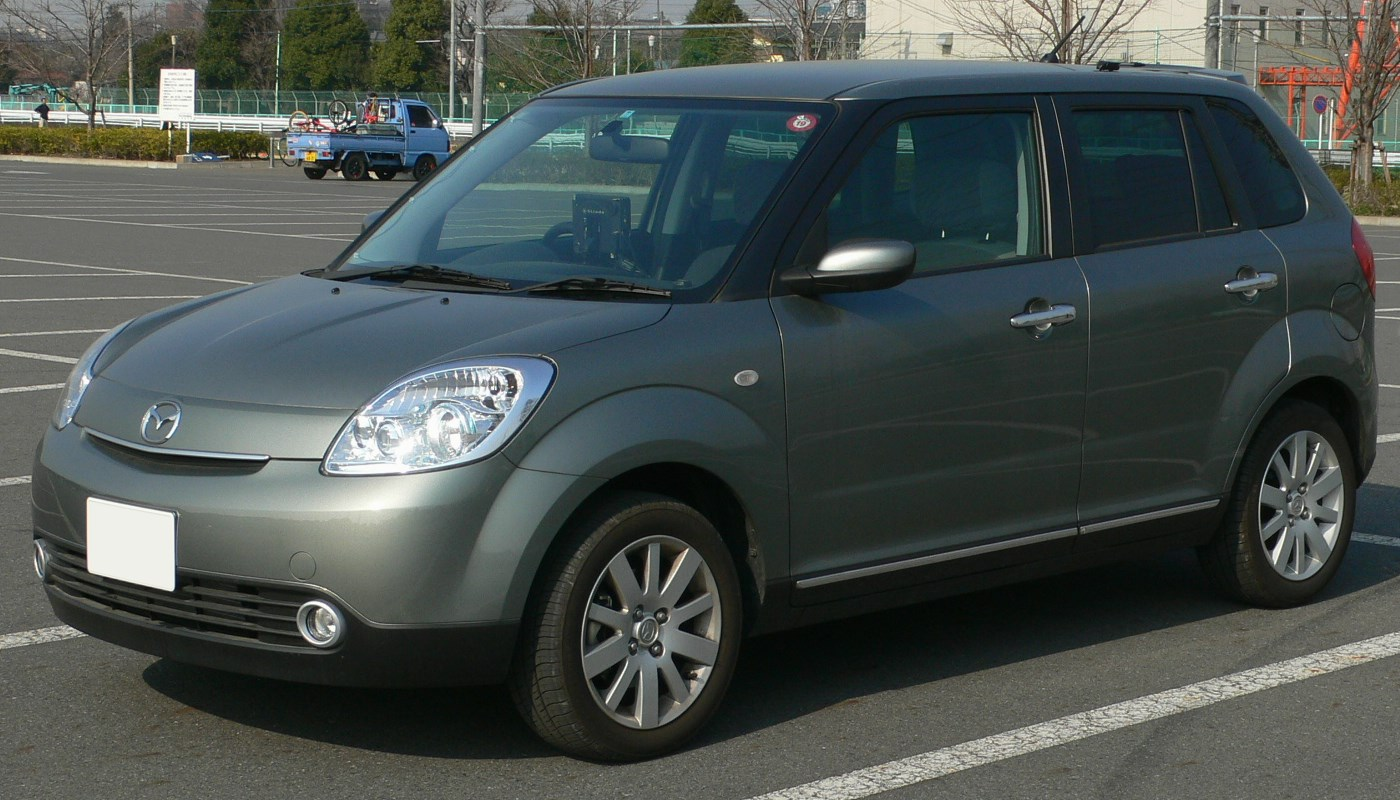
Mazda Verisa

== B2E ==
The new B2E platform was designed and developed as Ford’s global B-segment platform. It is the first B-platform developed by Ford's global product development process.

This global platform has been used since 2008 on the following vehicles:

- Ford B-Max (2012–2017)
- Ford EcoSport (2012–2023)
- Ford Fiesta Mk6 (2008–2019)
- Ford Fiesta Mk7 (2017–2023)
- Ford Ka+/Figo (2014–2021)
- Ford Puma (2019–present)
- Ford Transit Courier MK1 (2014–2023)
- Ford Transit Courier MK2 (2023–present)
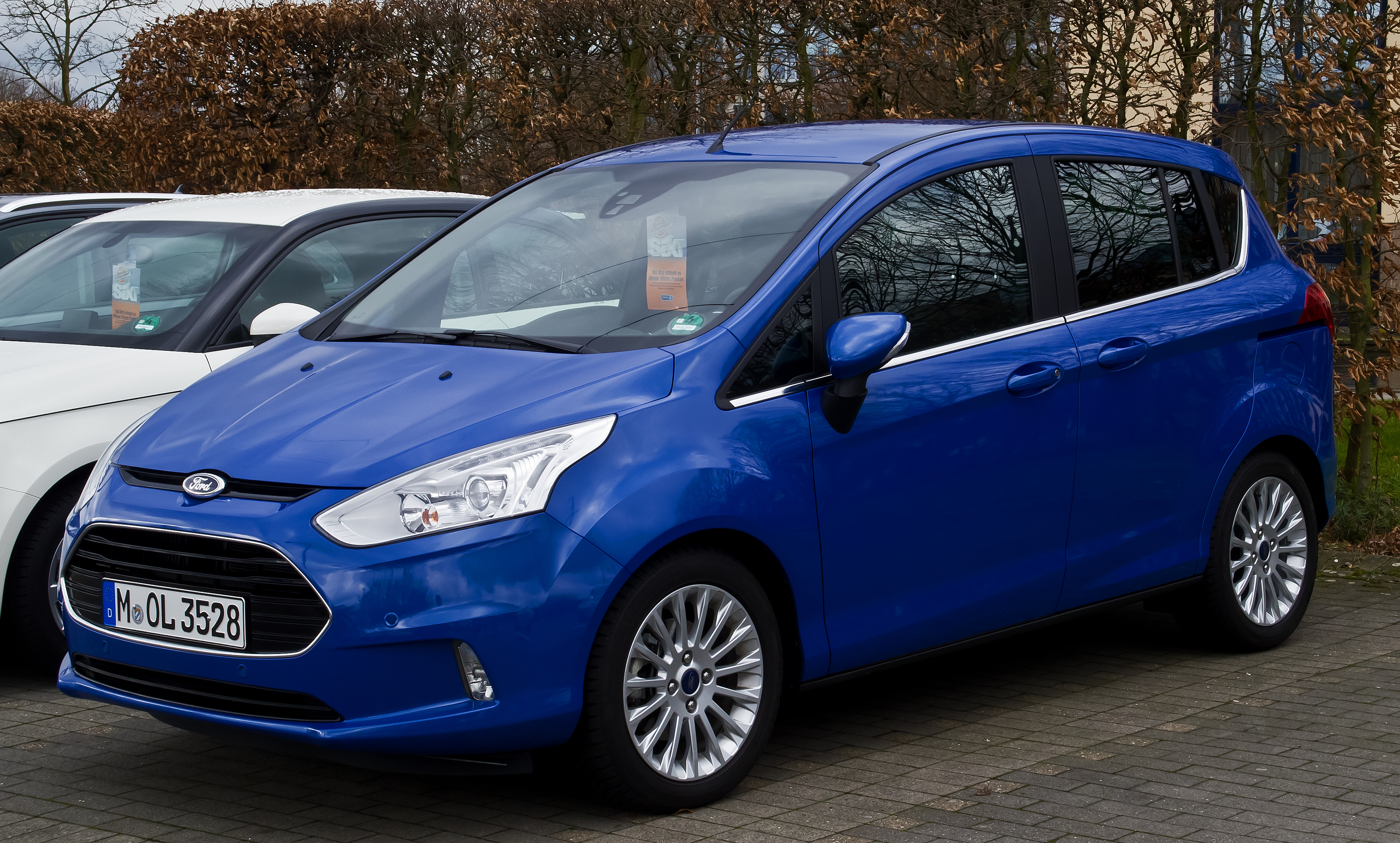
Ford B-Max

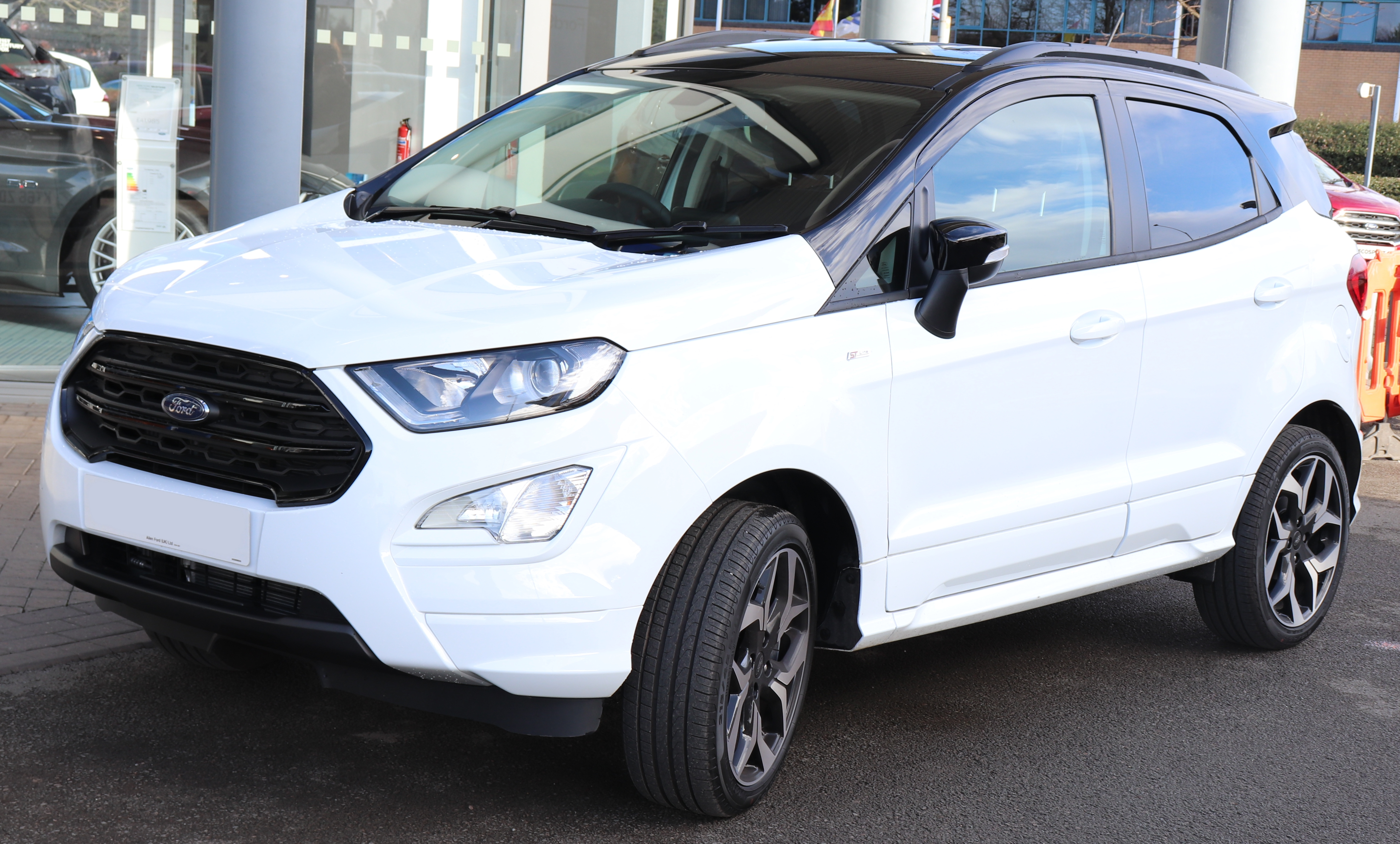
Ford EcoSport

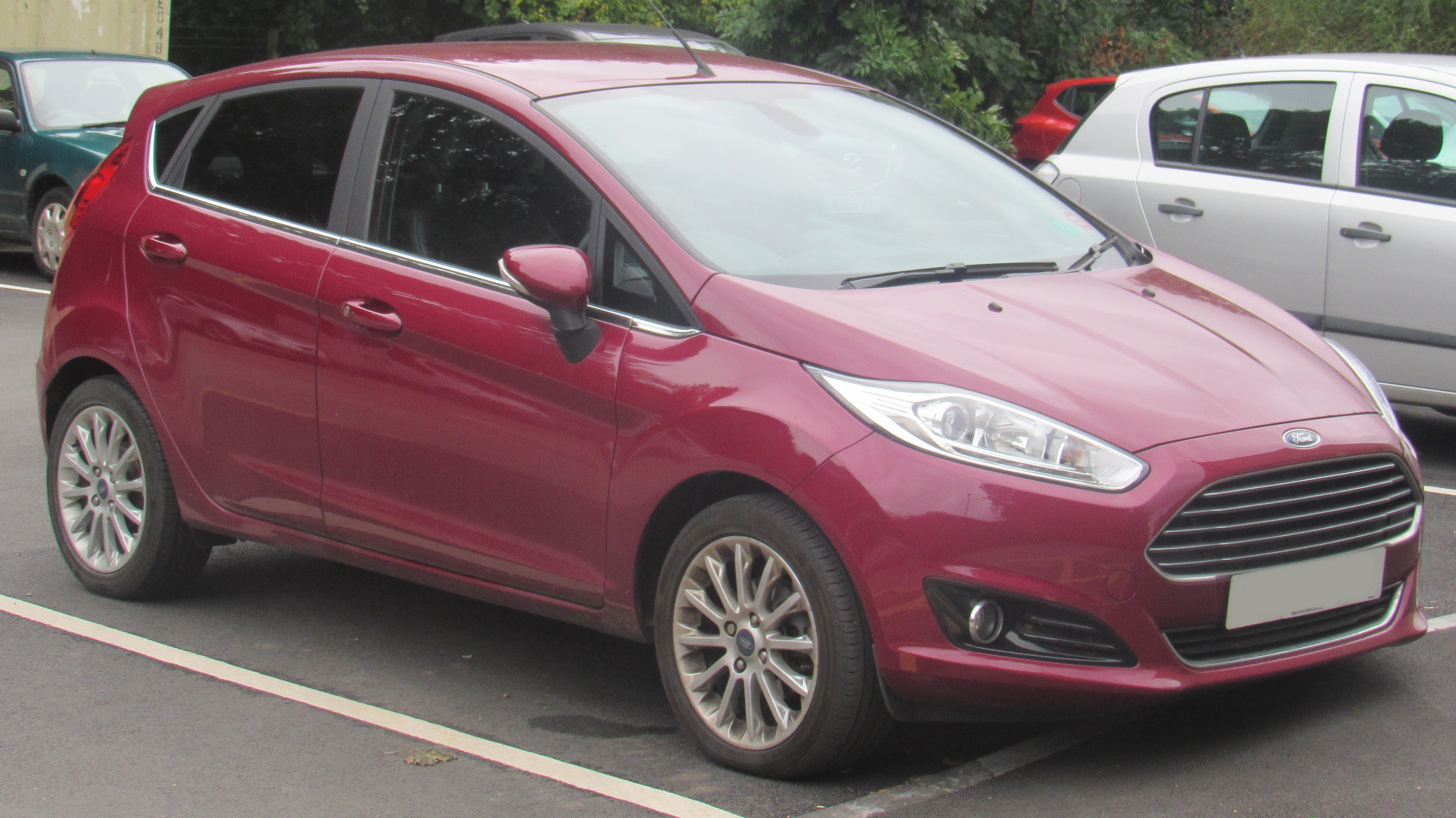
Ford Fiesta MK6

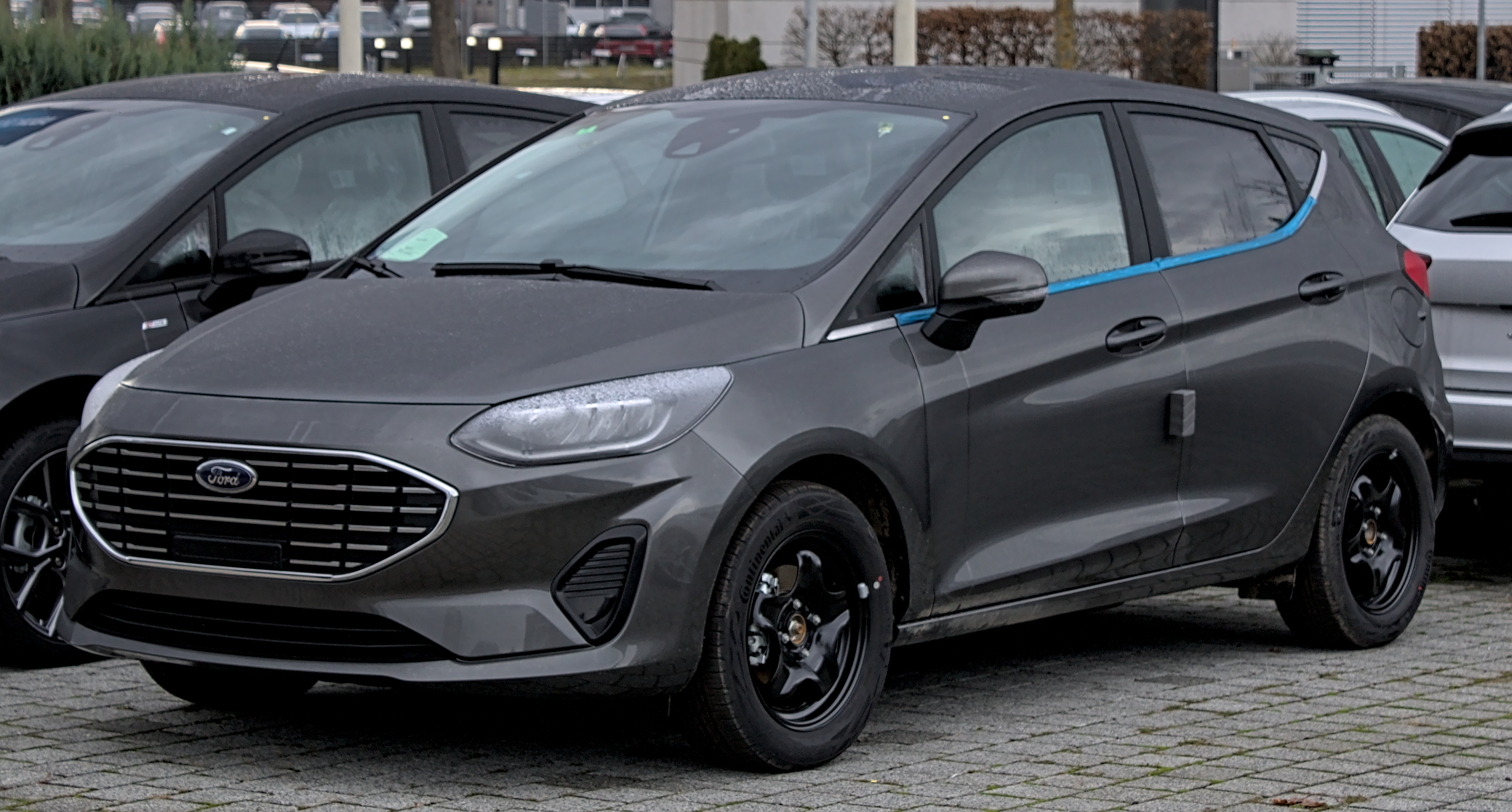
Ford Fiesta MK7

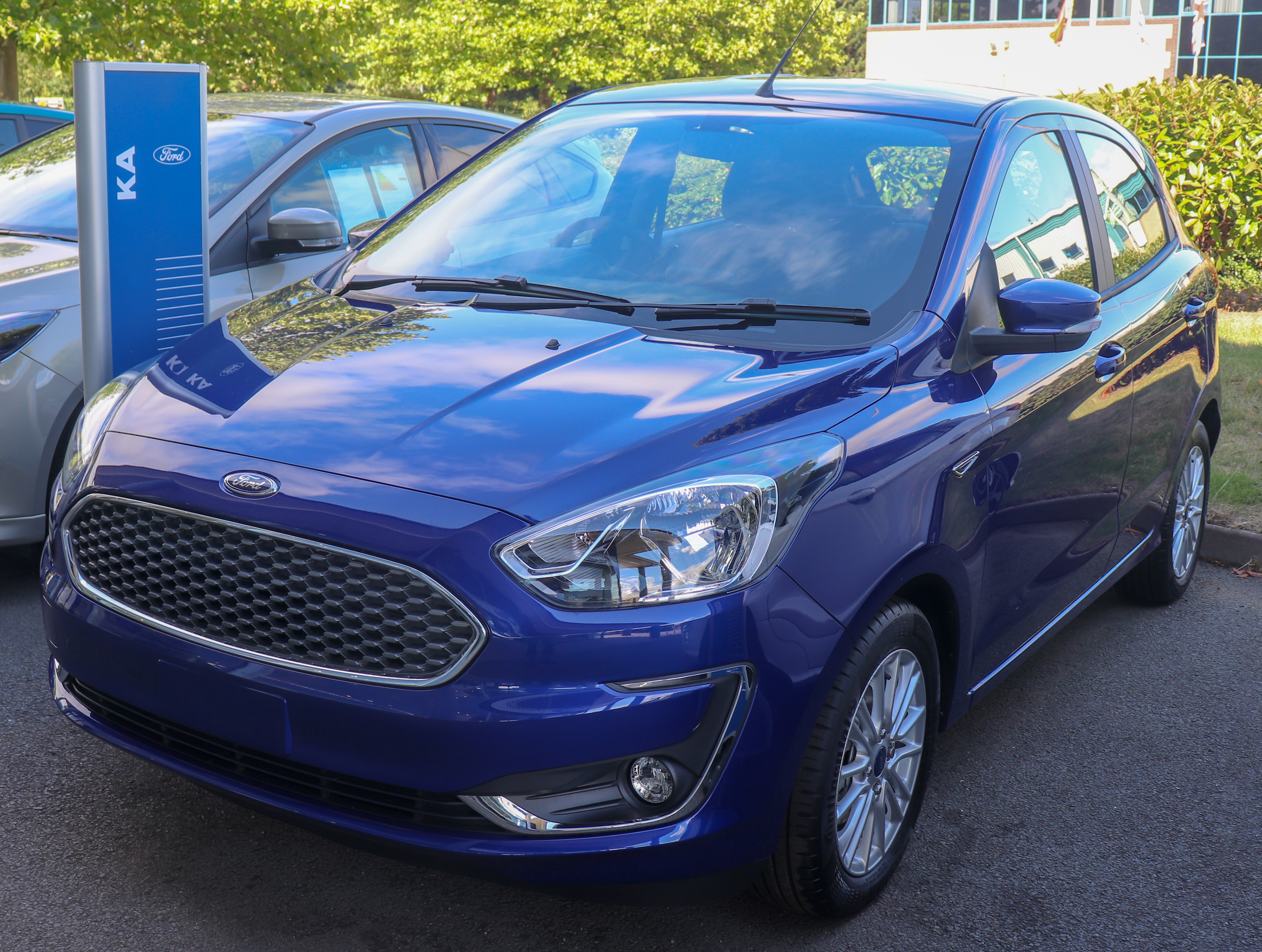
Ford Ka+

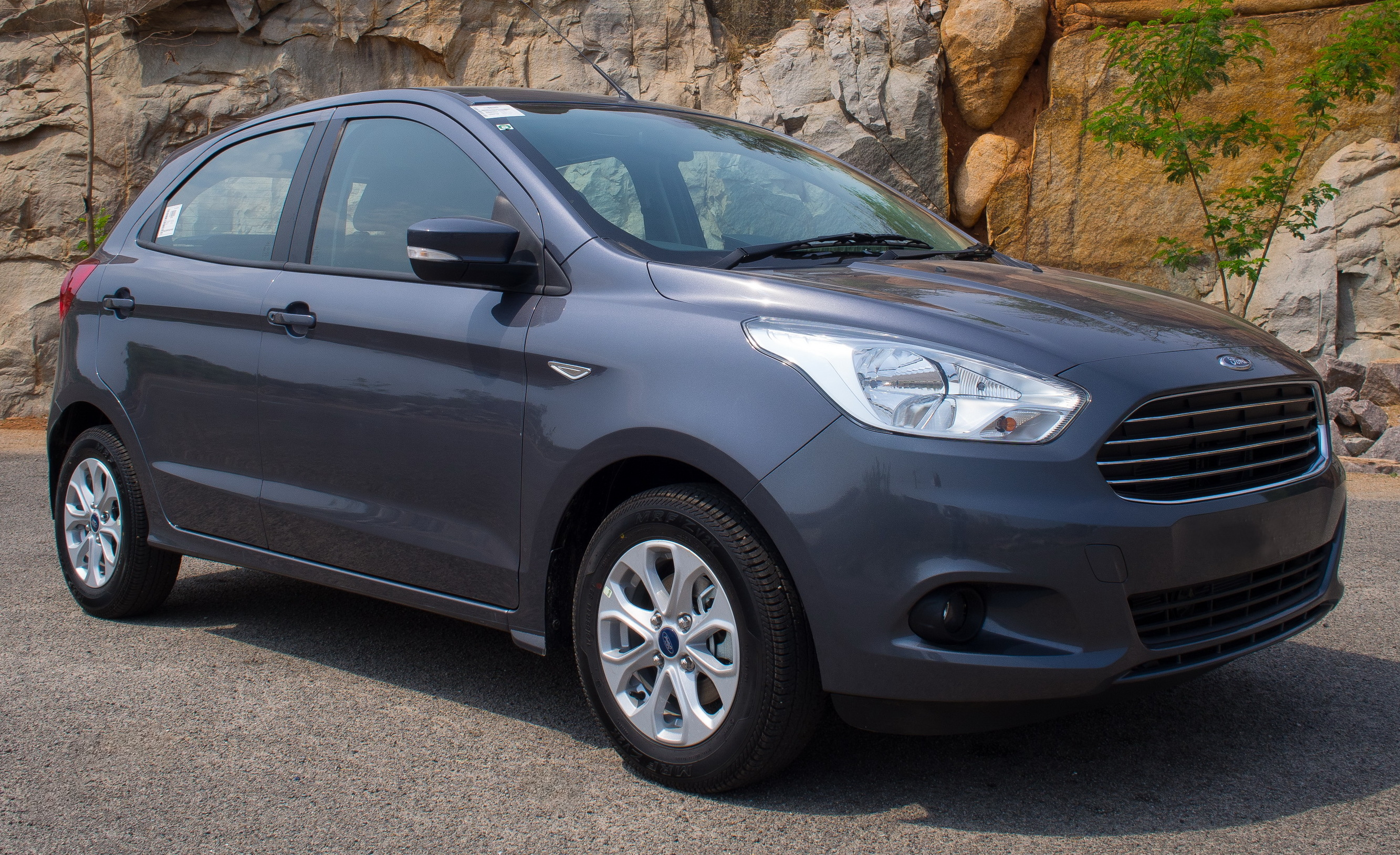
Ford Figo MK2

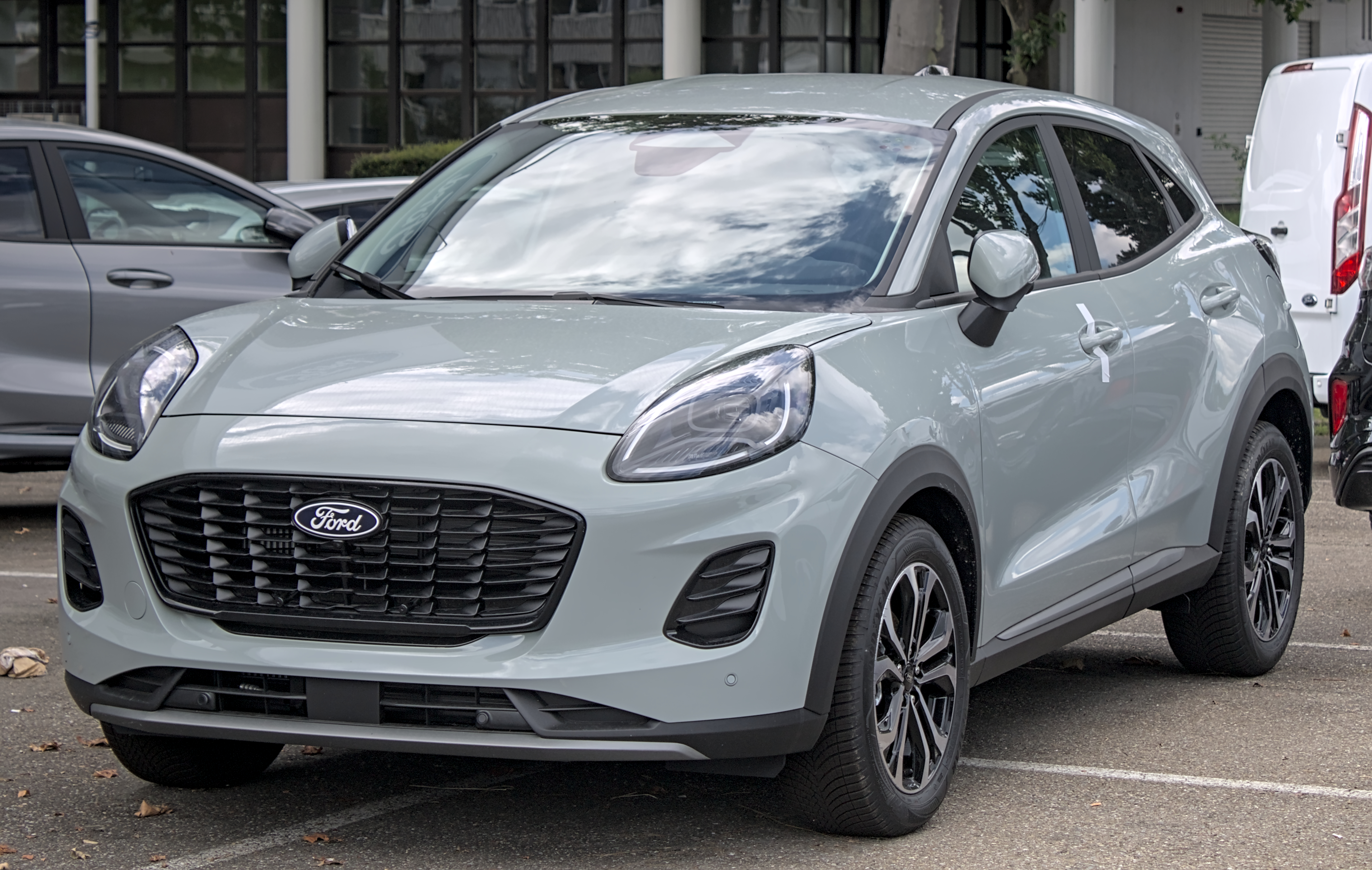
Ford Puma

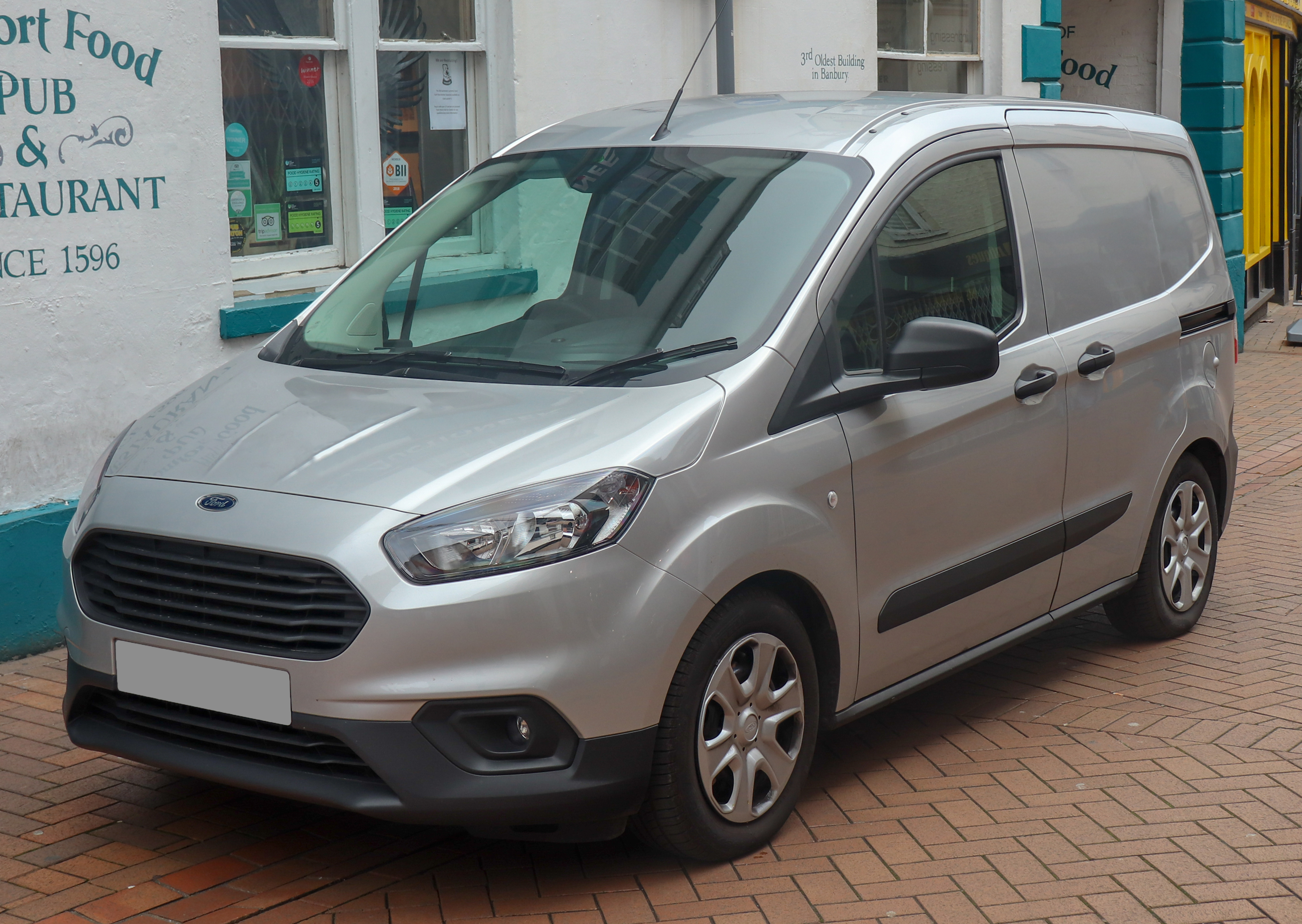
Ford Transit Courier MK1

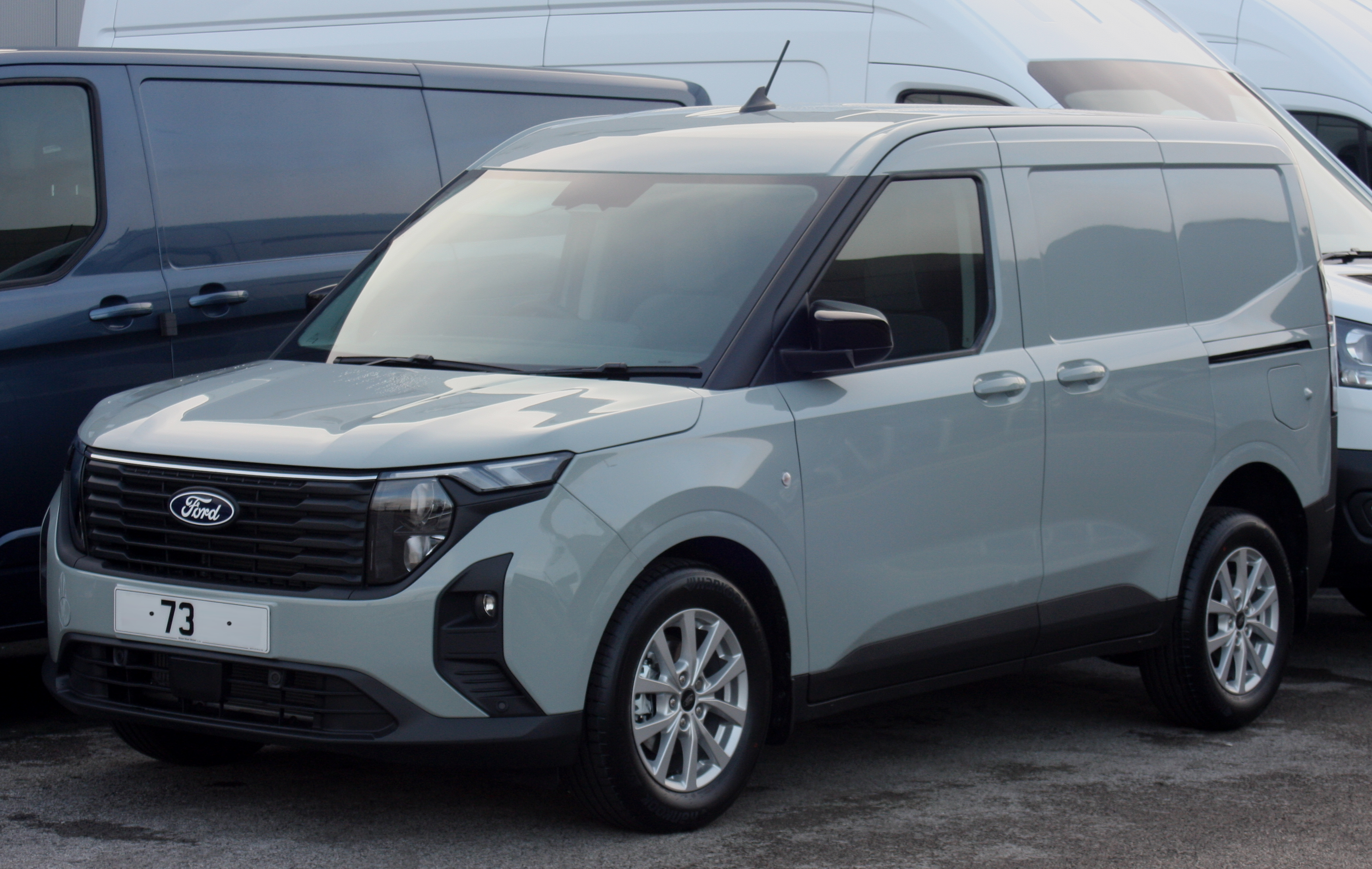
Ford Transit Courier MK2
