= Ford B platform =

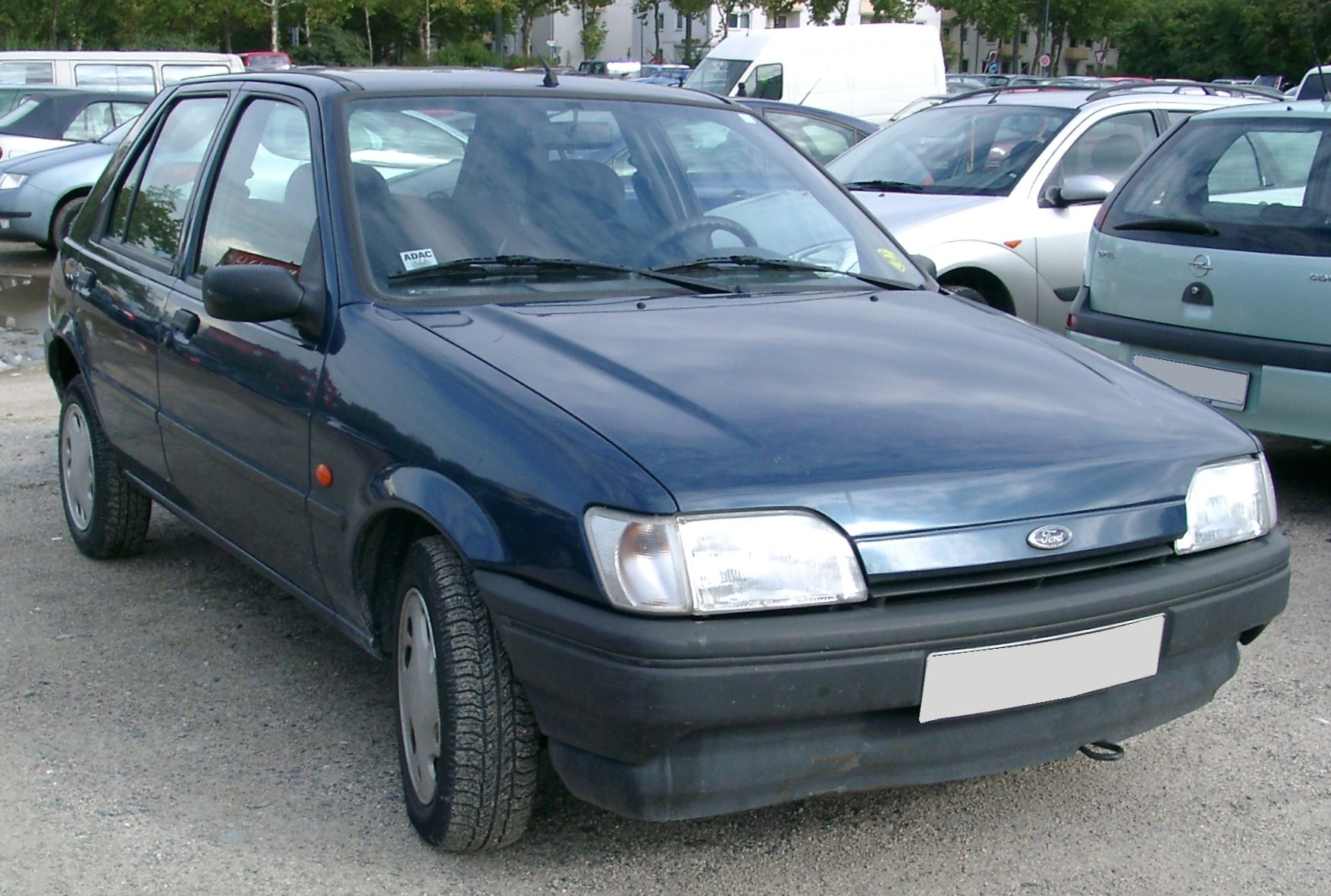

Overview
- Manufacturer: Ford Motor Company
- Also called: Ford BE-1 platform (until 1989); Ford BE-2 platform (from 1989)
- Production: 1976–2003

Body and chassis
- Class: Subcompact (B) platform

Chronology
- Successor: Ford B3 platform

The Ford B platform is an automobile platform used for Ford subcompact cars from the late 1970s through the early 2000s. It was used in the Ford Fiesta, Ford Ka, Ford Puma, and Ford Courier. It was superseded by the Ford B3 platform in 2004.
