= Ford Transit Courier =

Leisure activity/commercial vehicle produced by Ford

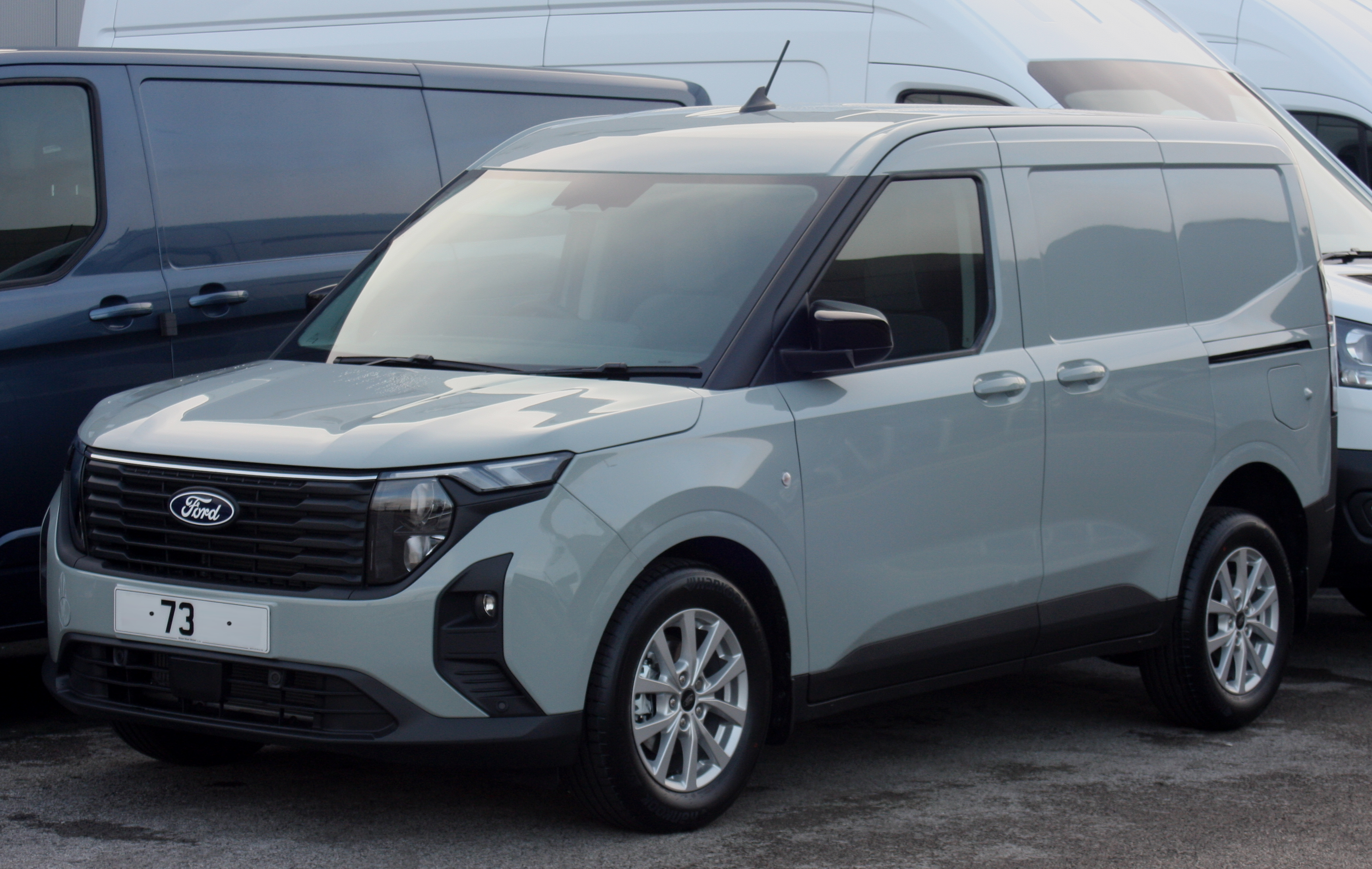
- 2024 Ford Transit Courier (Europe)

Overview
- Manufacturer: Ford
- Production: 2014–present

Body and chassis
- Class: Small commercial vehicle Leisure activity vehicle
- Layout: Front-engine, front-wheel-drive

Chronology
- Predecessor: Ford Courier; Ford Galaxy (Tourneo Courier)

The Ford Transit Courier is a small delivery vehicle marketed by Ford of Europe. Making its debut as a model of 2014 at the 2013 Geneva Motor Show, the Transit Courier is the smallest vehicle of the product range of the Ford Transit. Deriving its underpinnings from the Ford Fiesta, the model line is the first van based on the Fiesta since the discontinuation of the Ford Courier in August 2002. The Tourneo Courier variant is marketed as leisure activity vehicle.

In contrast to the Transit and Transit Connect, the Transit Courier is marketed primarily by Ford of Europe, and is not marketed in North America with the exception of Mexico between 2021-2023. The passenger version of the Transit Courier (outside the United Kingdom) is known as the Ford Tourneo Courier, in line with other Ford passenger vans sold globally.

== First generation (2014) ==
First generation
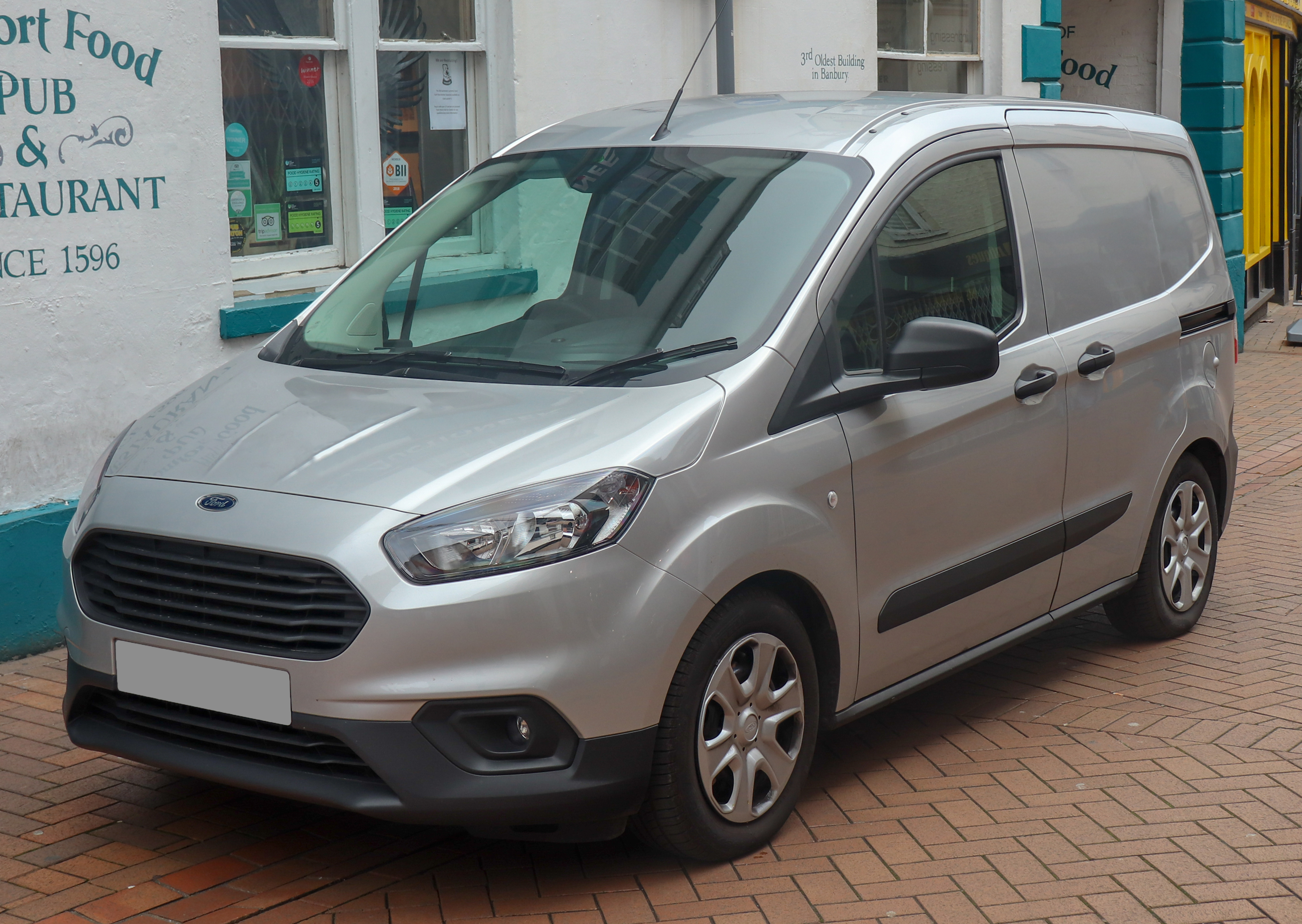
- 2018 Ford Transit Courier (facelift)

Overview
- Also called: Ford Tourneo Courier
- Production: 2014–2023
- Model years: 2021–2023 (Mexico)
- Assembly: Turkey: Yeniköy Merkez, Başiskele, Kocaeli (Ford Otosan)

Body and chassis
- Body style: 2-door panel van 4/5-door panel van 5-door MPV
- Platform: Ford Global B-car
- Related: Ford B-Max; Ford Fiesta Mk6

Powertrain
- Engine: Petrol: 1.0 L EcoBoost I3; Diesel: 1.5 L Duratorq TDCi I4; 1.6 L Duratorq TDCi I4
- Transmission: 5-speed manual 6-speed manual

Dimensions
- Wheelbase: 2,489 mm (98.0 in)
- Length: 4,160 mm (163.8 in)
- Width: 1,796 mm (70.7 in)
- Height: 1,747 mm (68.8 in)
- Kerb weight: 1,190–1,310 kg (2,624–2,888 lb)

While sharing the name of the full size Transit and Transit Custom, the Transit Courier shares the global B platform with the Ford Fiesta and B-Max. Its front styling is similar to the Fiesta, while its dashboard is shared with the B-Max.

Inside, a docking port option in the dashboard allows electronic devices such as mobile phones, MP3 players or portable navigation systems to connect. An option includes Sync Wizard which integrates voice control of the entertainment and communications system with connected devices.

Like the B-Max, the Tourneo Courier passenger van is a five passenger vehicle. The rear seat is a 60/40 split bench seat. The outboard rear seats have Isofix (child seat) brackets as well as a connection point with integrated USB and AUX port fitted as standard.

Behind the rear seat, an adjustable height luggage rack divides the cargo space so that both light and heavy cargo can be stowed separately.

In Mexico, the Ford Transit Courier was introduced in 2021. It was only offered with a 1.0-litre inline-3 engine. It was discontinued in 2023 due to low sales and was eventually replaced by the Transit Custom.

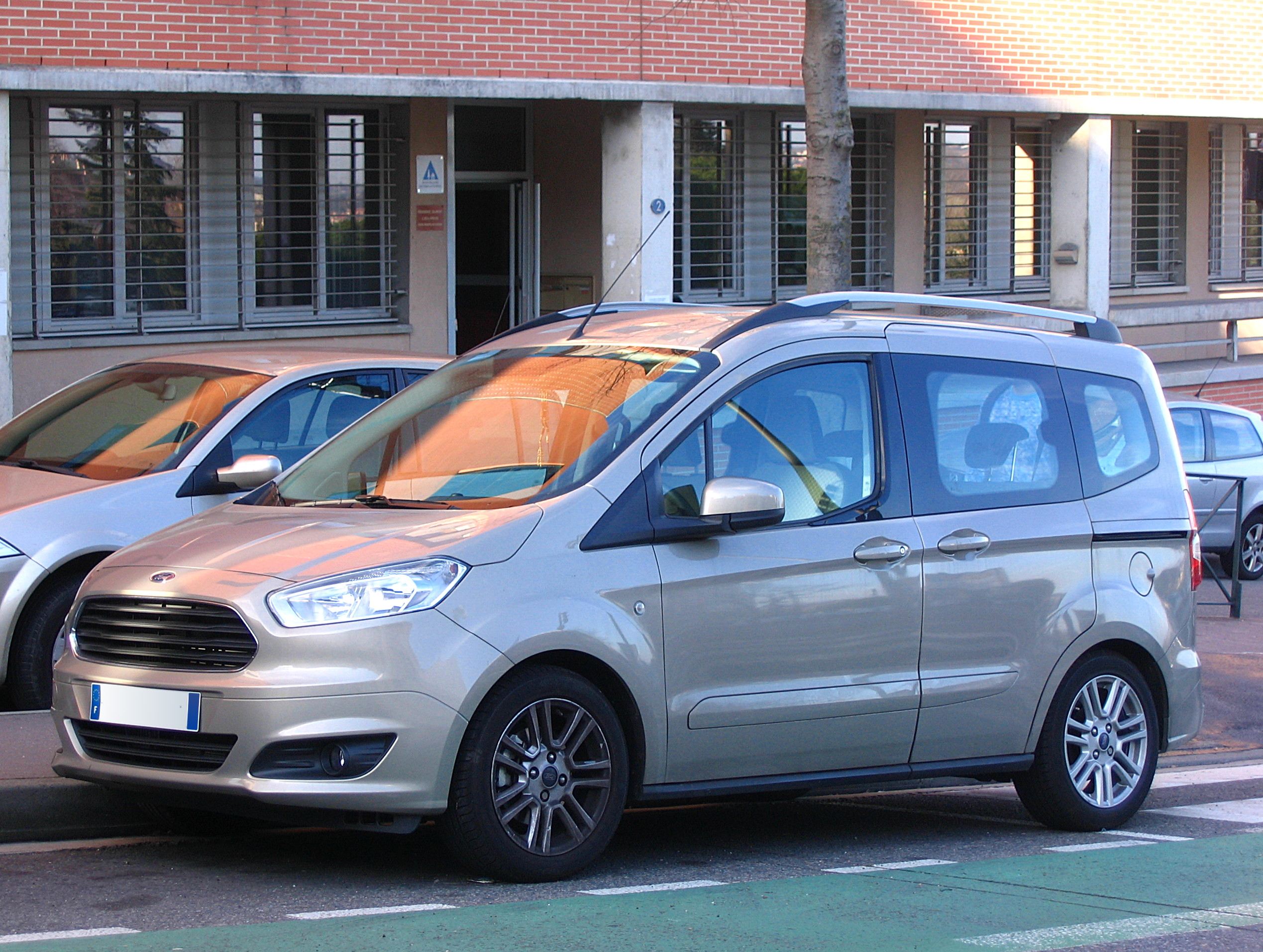
Front view (pre-facelift)

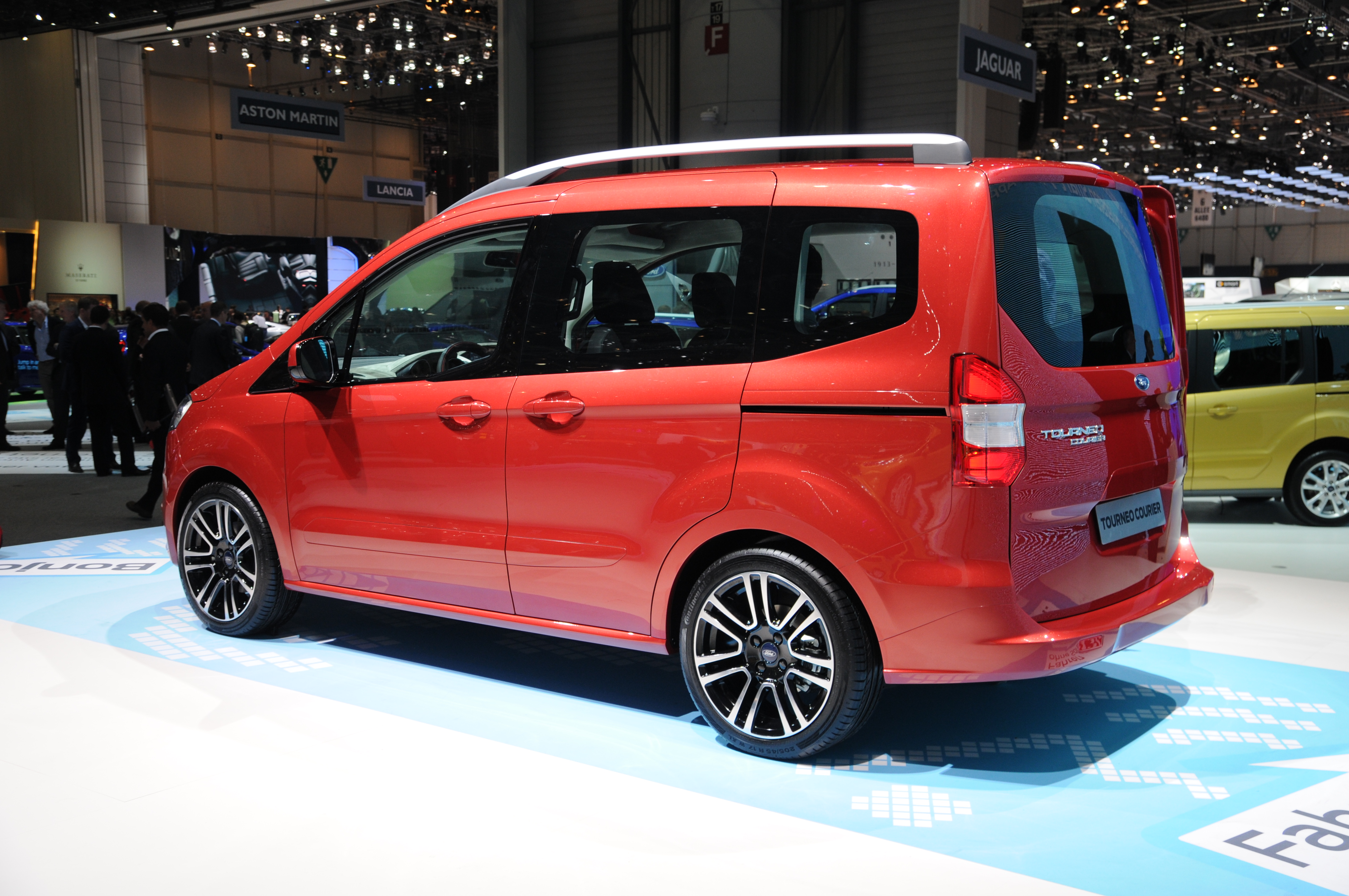
Rear view (pre-facelift)

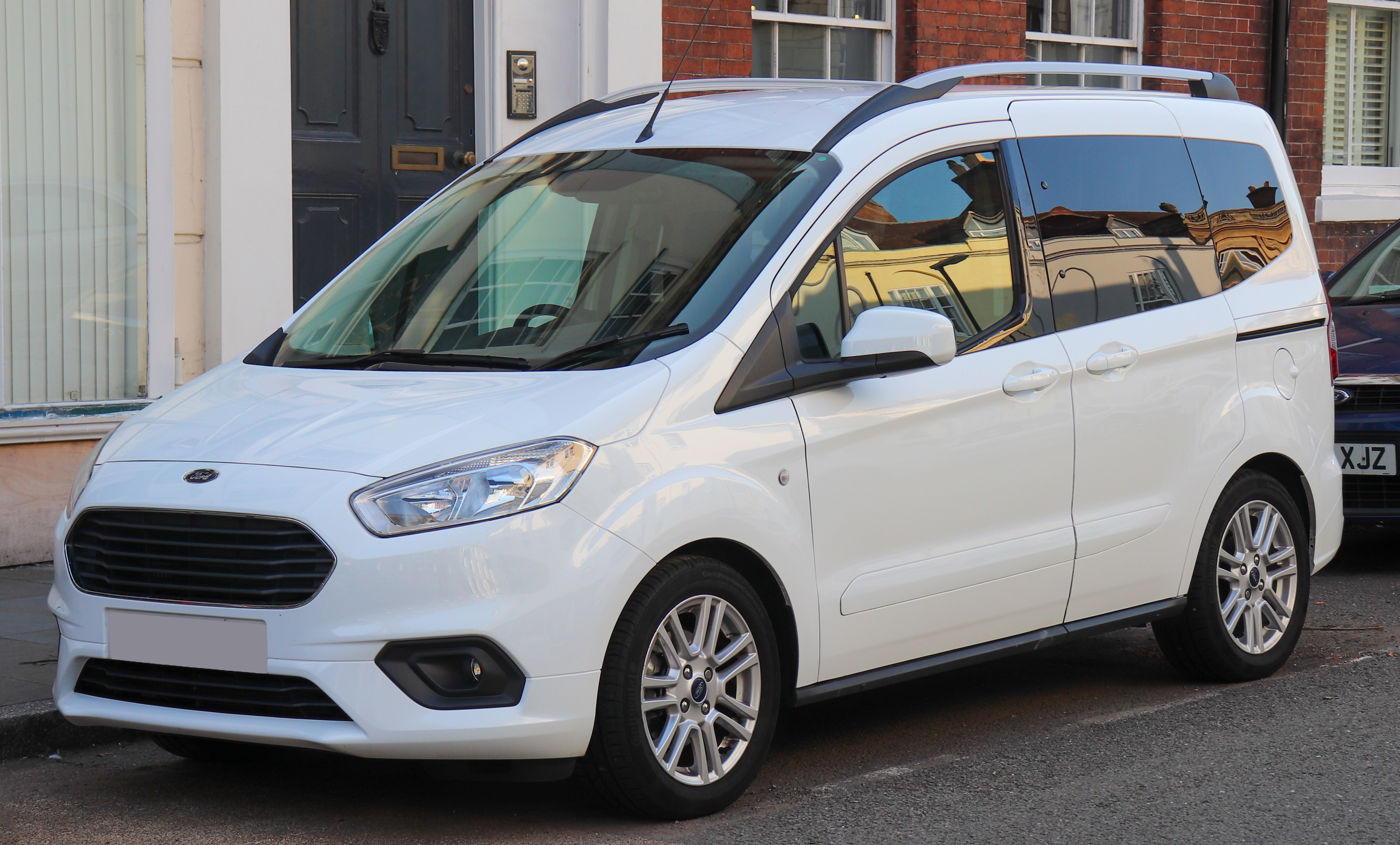
Front view (facelift)

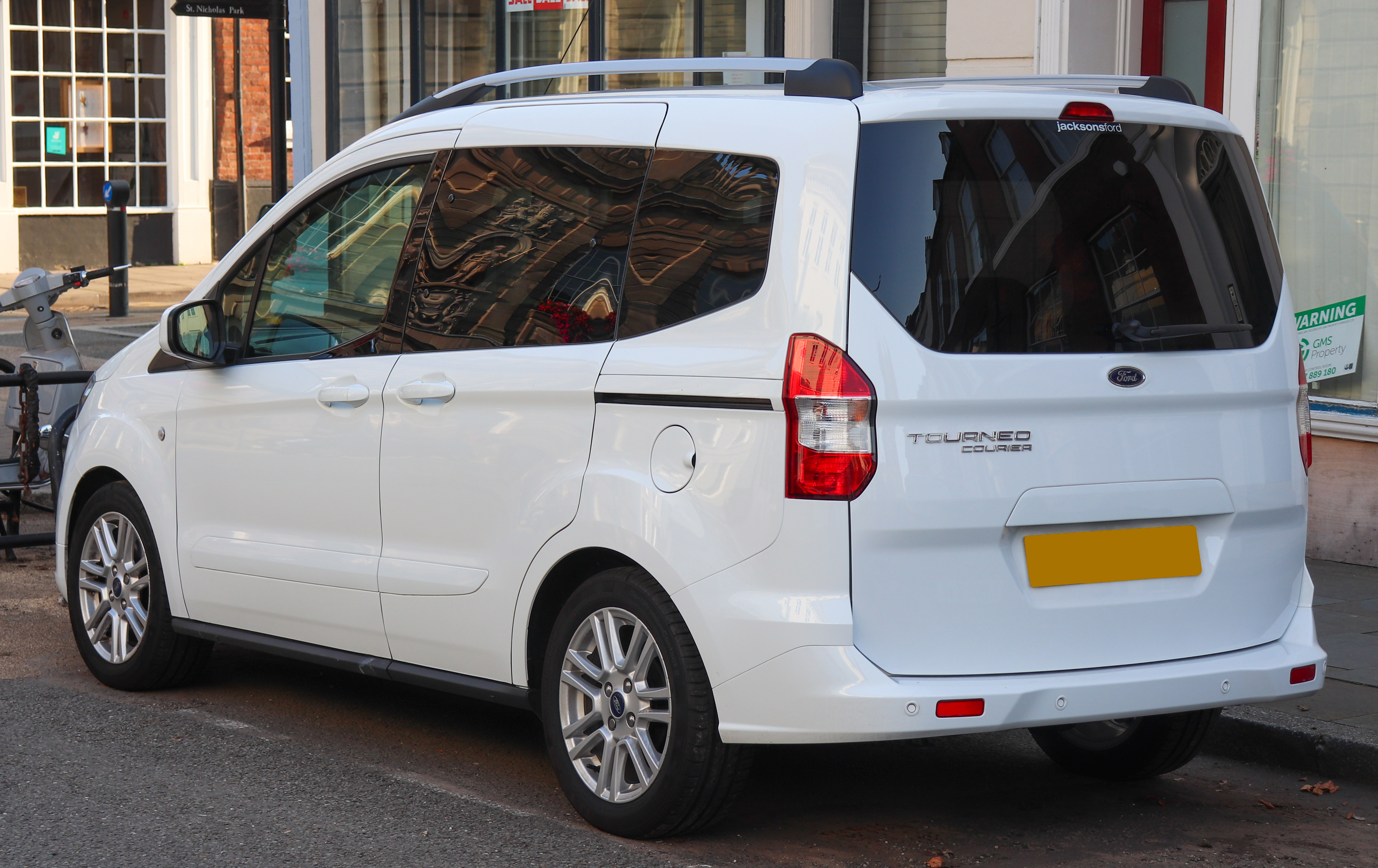
Rear view (facelift)

=== Cargo handling ===
In the van version as Transit Courier there is a standard partition and a load volume of 2.3 cubic metres (81 cubic feet) with a maximum payload of 660 kilograms (1,460 pounds) standard. The cargo area of the Transit Courier has a load length of 1.62 m (64 in), which can be extended to 2.59 m (102 in), allowing for the transport of a standard euro pallet.

Two sliding side doors, six lashing eyes and mounting points in the body for the installation of shelves or installation systems offer many variations for commercial use. To increase cargo space, the vehicle is fitted with a folding passenger seat and an optional grid partition between the cockpit and cargo area. Optionally, LED lighting is available for the cargo area.

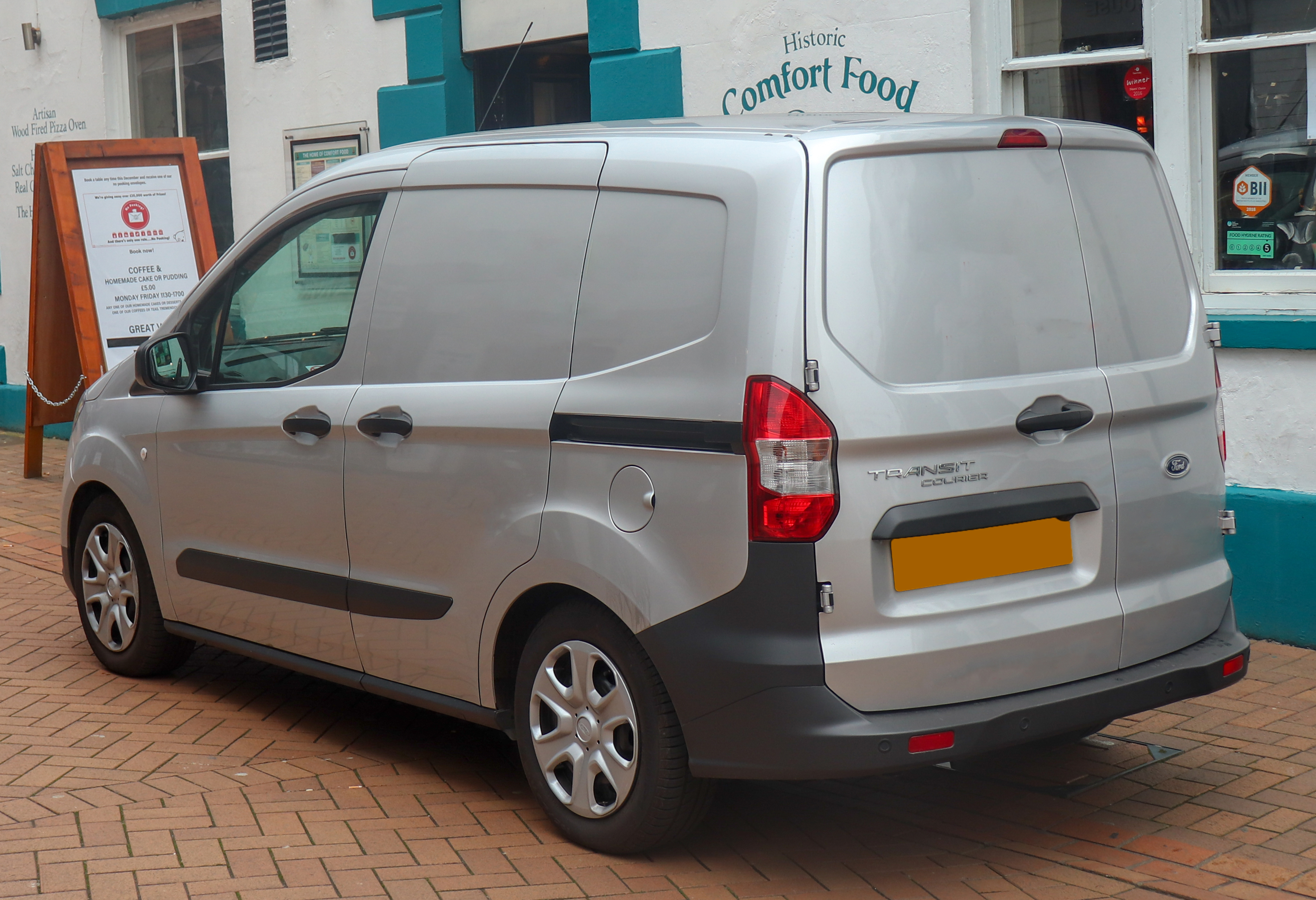
Rear view (facelift)

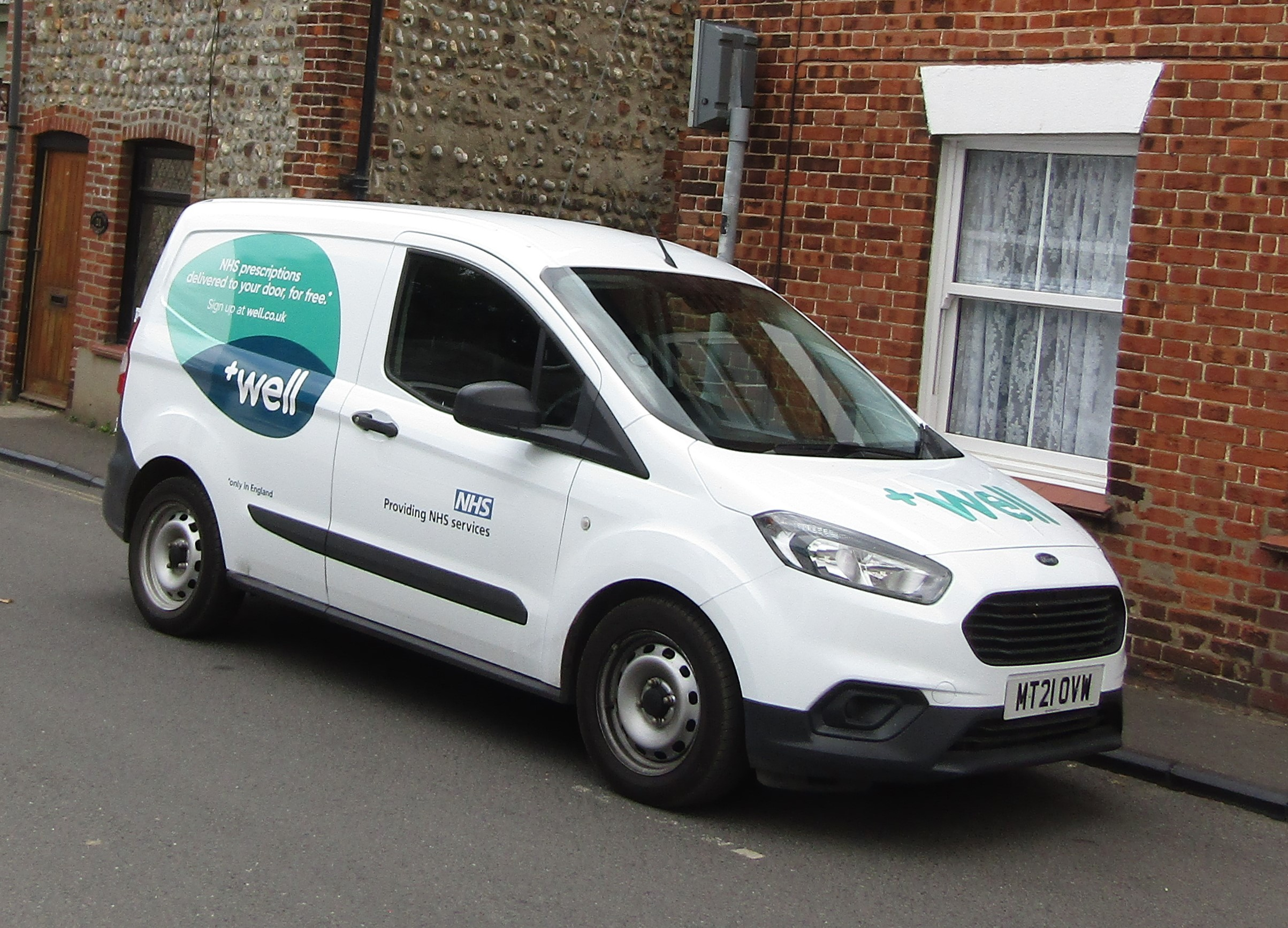
2-door panel van (facelift)

=== Powertrain ===
The base engine for the Transit/Tourneo Courier is the 1.0L 3-cylinder EcoBoost engine producing 100 PS (74 kW). Alongside the petrol engine are two diesels: A 1.5L Duratorq producing 75 PS (55 kW) and a 1.6L Duratorq producing 95 PS (70 kW). On all three engines, Ford offers their start stop system to reduce fuel consumption.

== Second generation (2023) ==
Second generation
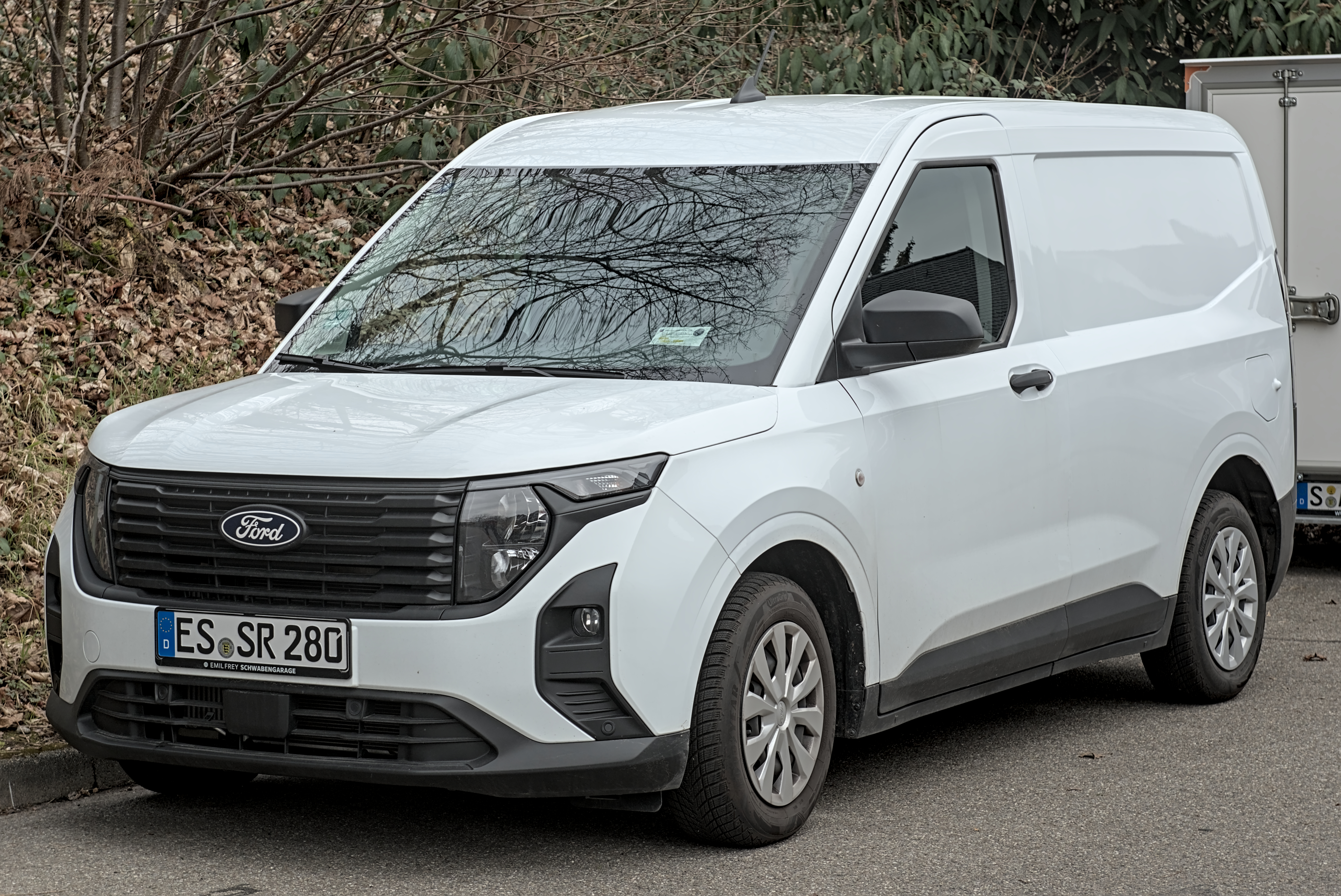

Overview
- Also called: Ford Tourneo Courier
- Production: 2023–present
- Assembly: Romania: Craiova (Craiova Assembly)
- Designer: Christopher Giroux

Body and chassis
- Body style: 4/5-door panel van 5-door MPV
- Platform: Ford Global B-car
- Related: Ford Puma EV; Ford Fiesta Mk7

Powertrain
- Engine: Petrol: 1.0 L EcoBoost I3; Diesel: 1.5 L EcoBlue I4
- Electric motor: 100 kW (130 hp)
- Transmission: 6-speed manual 7-speed dual clutch

Dimensions
- Wheelbase: 2,690 mm (105.9 in)
- Length: 4,340 mm (170.9 in)
- Width: 1,790 mm (70.5 in)
- Height: 1,830 mm (72.0 in)
- Kerb weight: 1,400–1,470 kg (3,086–3,241 lb)

The second generation adopts a sharper design, a more modern interior and an electric version. It is based on a Ford platform, unlike the Tourneo Connect which is derived from the Volkswagen Caddy.

Production of the E-Transit Courier is scheduled to begin in late 2024 at the Craiova plant in Romania, where the Puma crossover is also manufactured.

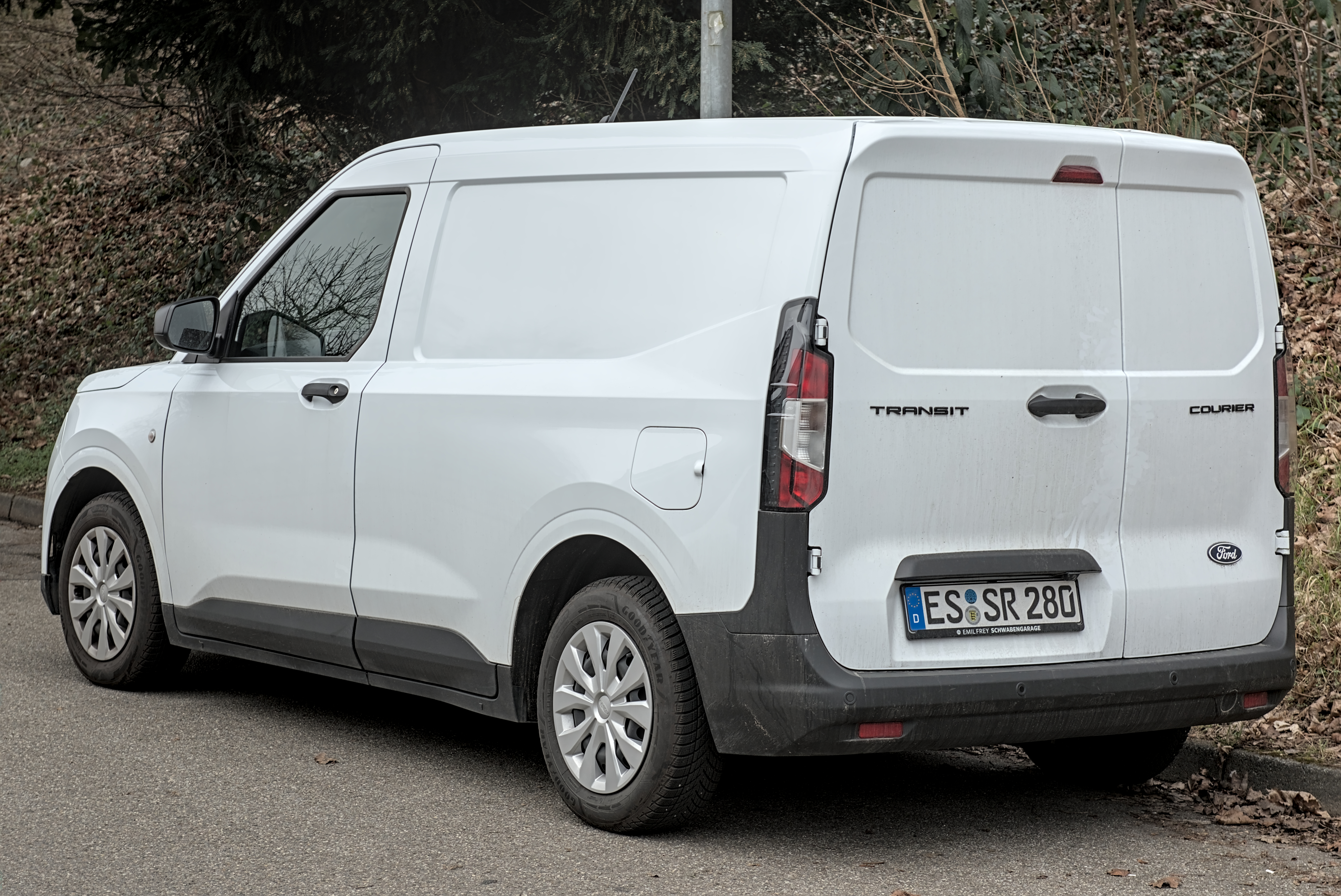
Rear view

=== Tourneo Courier ===
The Tourneo Courier was unveiled on 15 May 2023 with a crossover-inspired Active trim and a battery electric model.

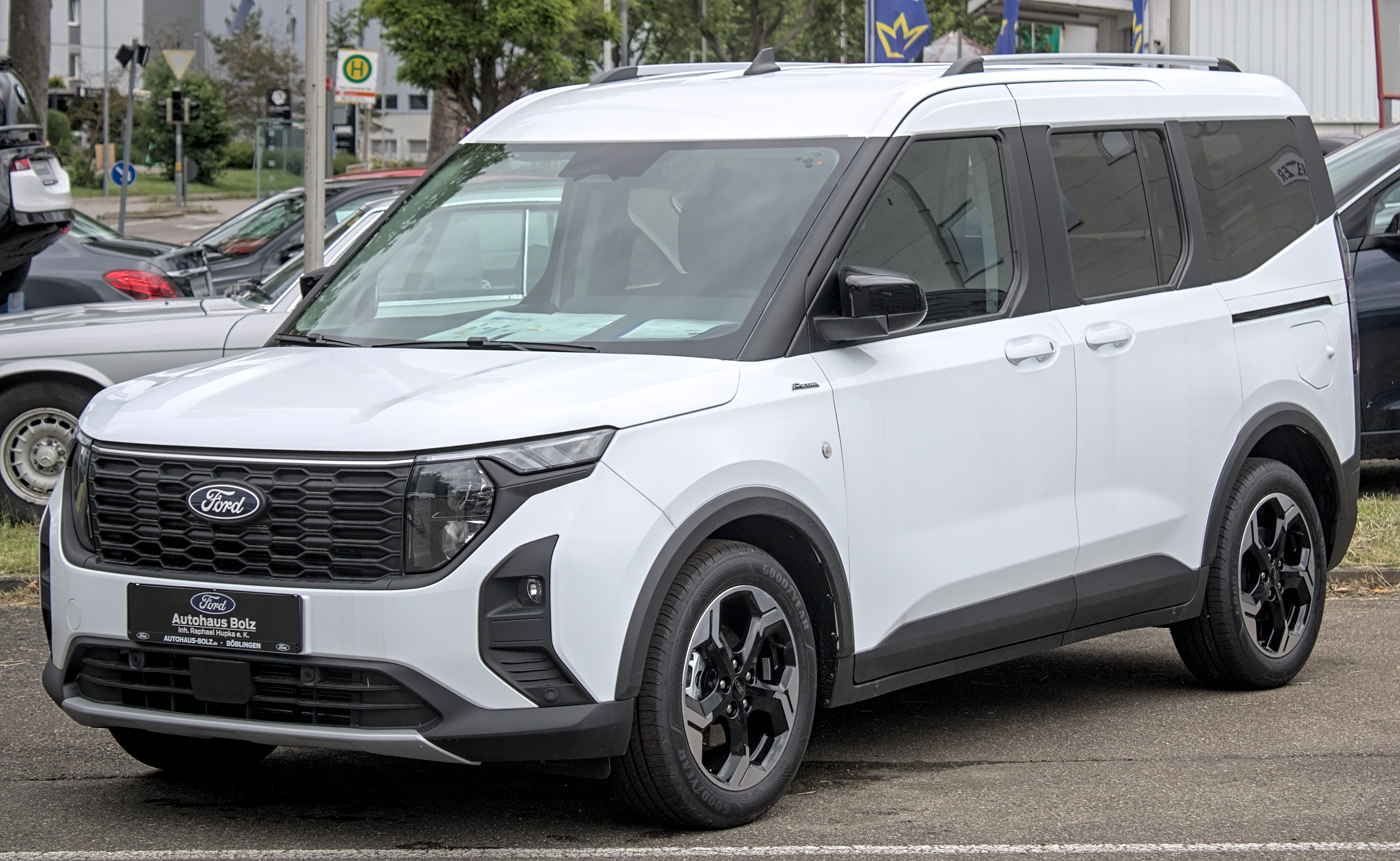
Tourneo Courier

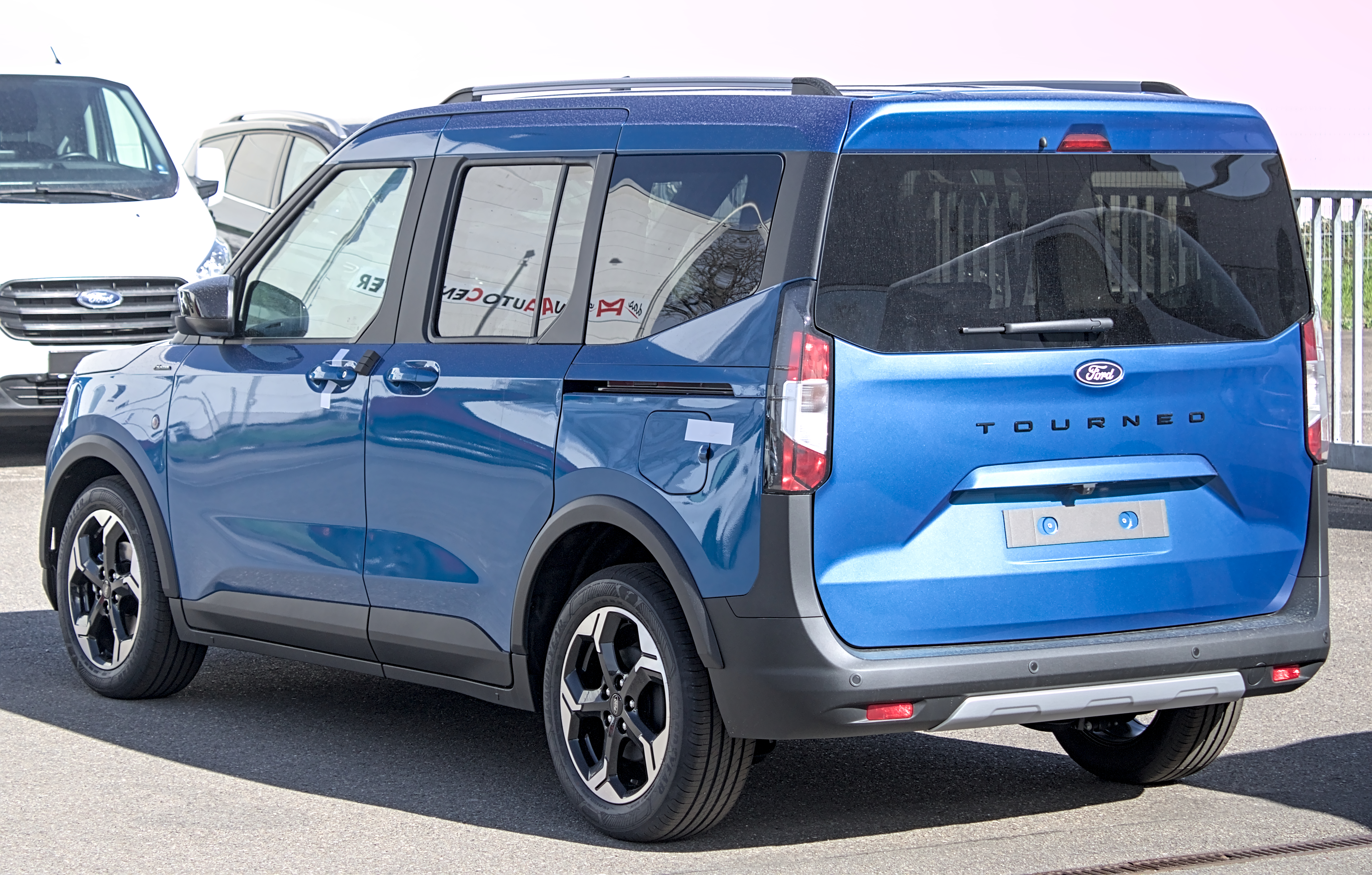
Rear view

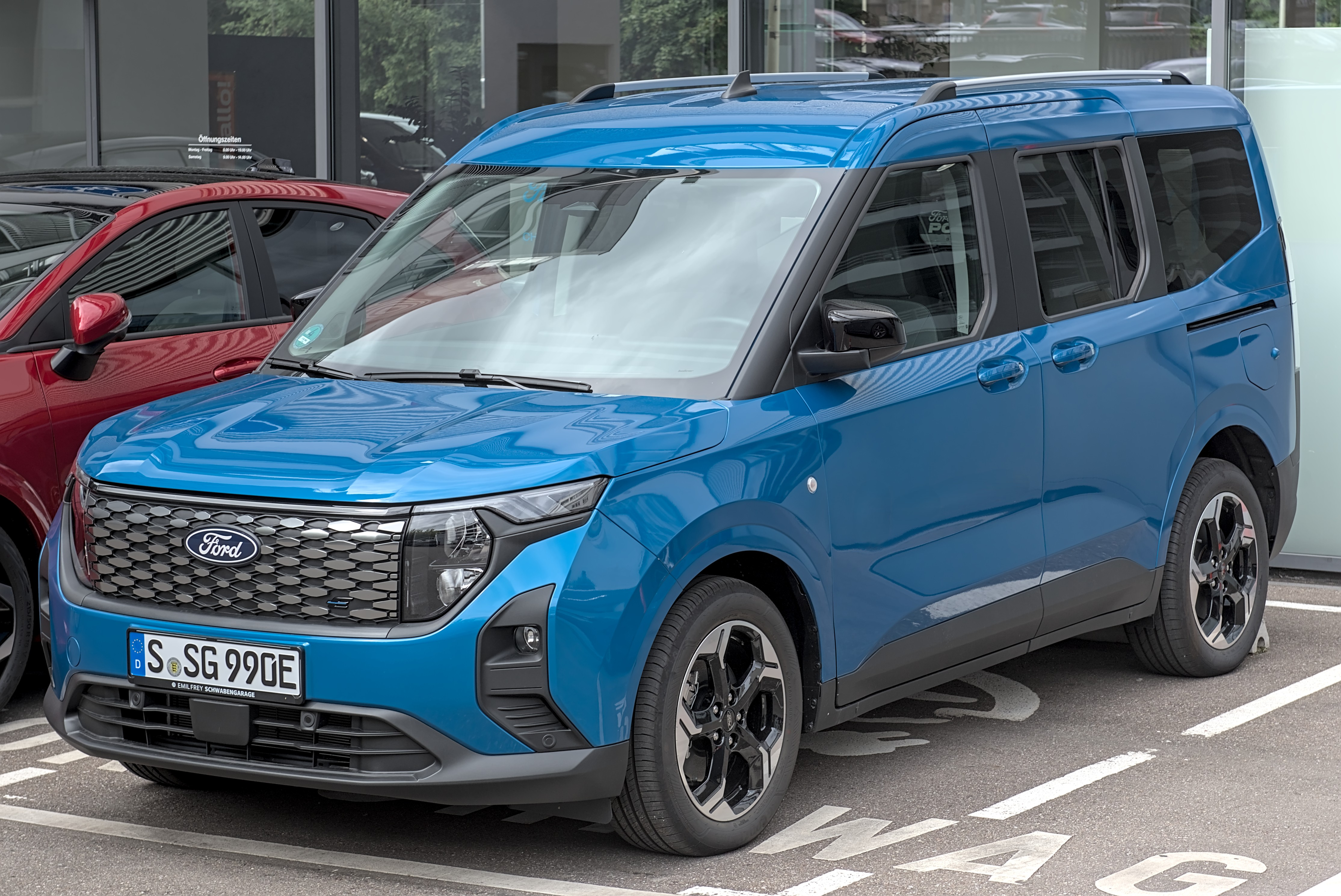
E-Tourneo Courier

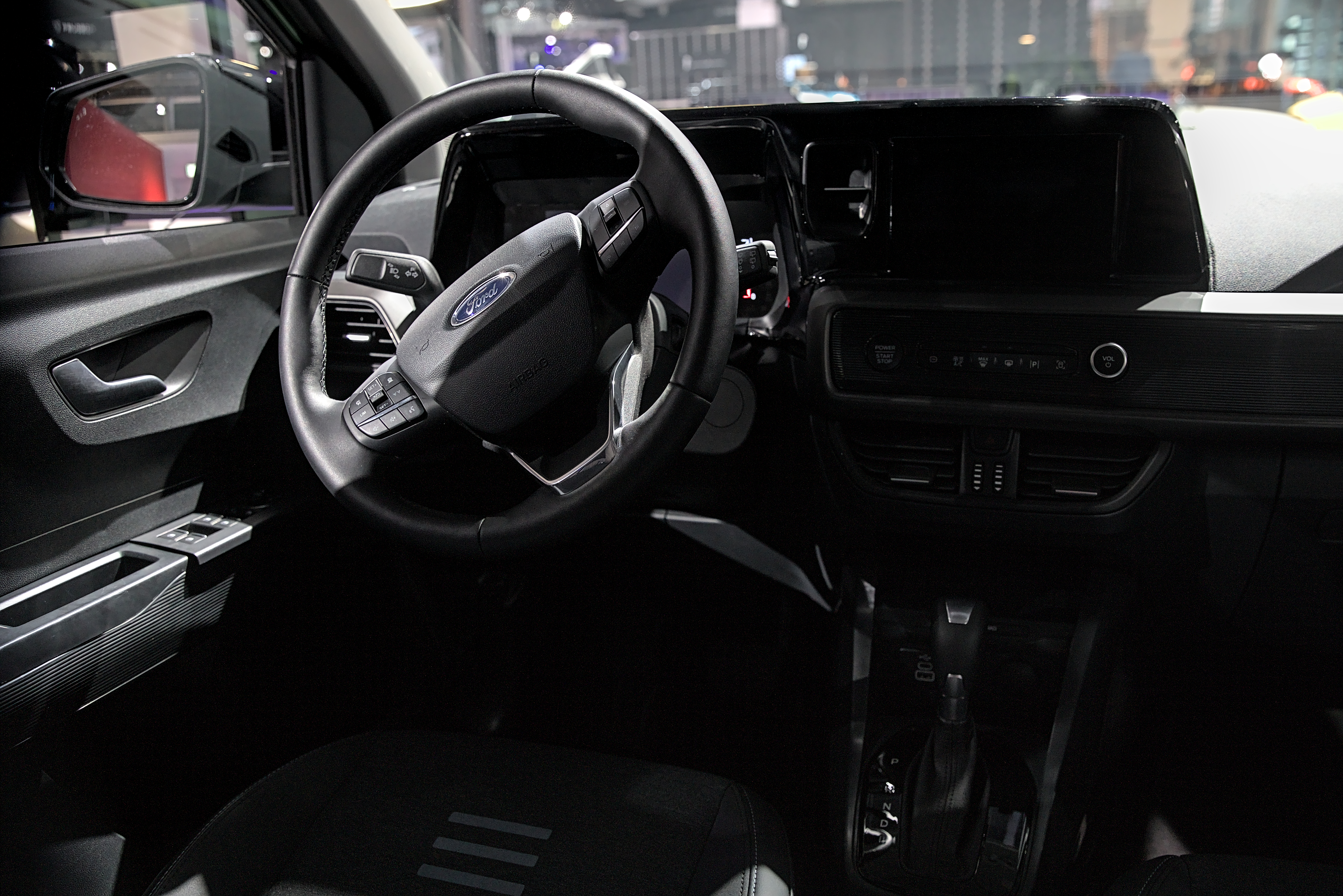
Interior

=== Safety ===
Euro NCAP test results Ford Tourneo Courier 1.0 Trend (LHD) (2024)
| Test | Points | % |
|---|---|---|
| Overall: | 3 /5 stars | |
| Adult occupant: | 25.2 | 62% |
| Child occupant: | 39.3 | 80% |
| Pedestrian: | 51.2 | 81% |
| Safety assist: | 9.8 | 54% |

Euro NCAP test results Ford Transit Courier (2025)
| Test | Score |
|---|---|
| Overall: | 5 /5 stars |
| Safe driving | 80% |
| Crash avoidance | 83% |
| Post crash | 80% |
