= Ford Focus (fourth generation) =

Fourth generation of Ford Focus

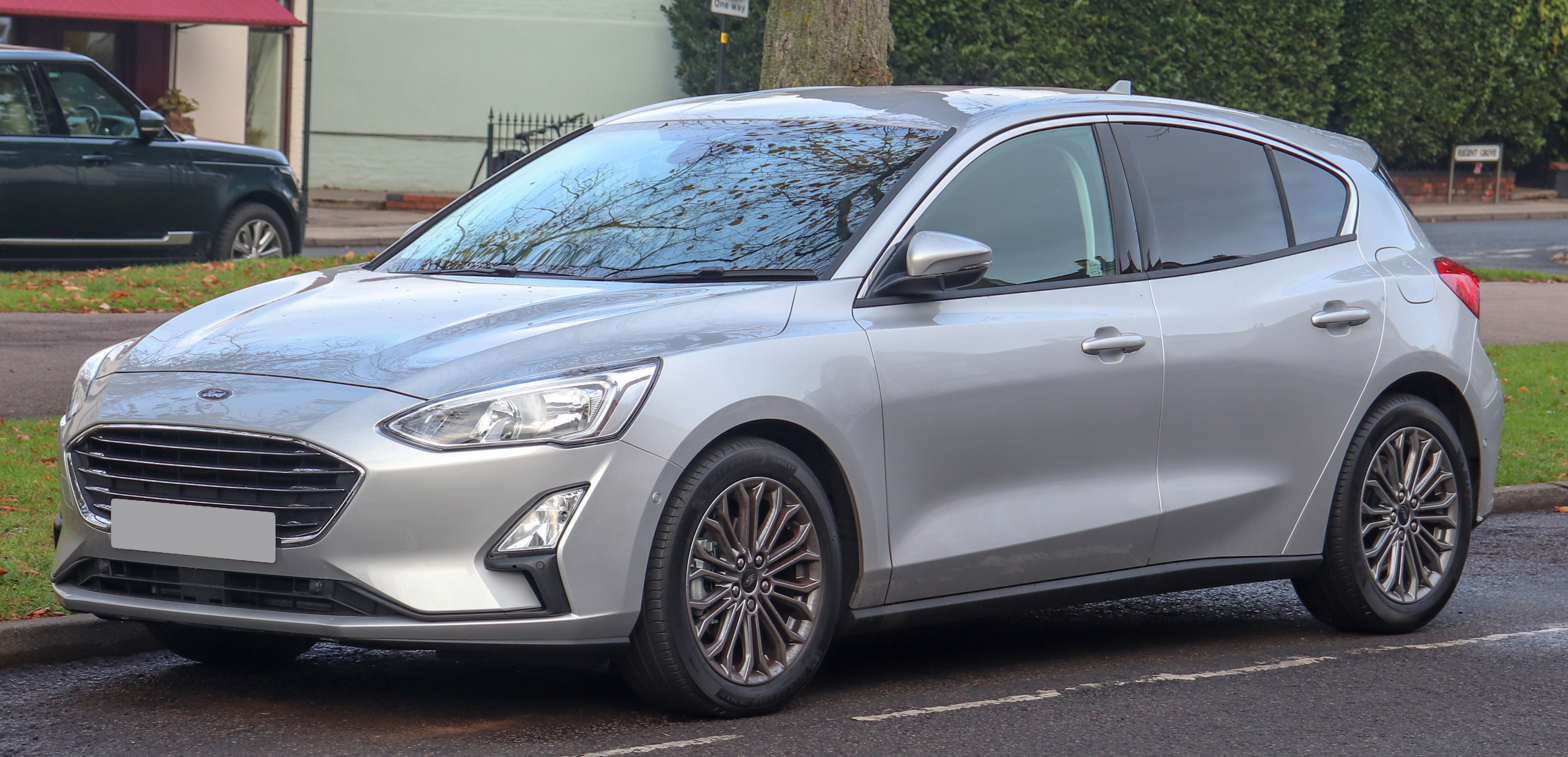
- 2018 Ford Focus Titanium X (UK)

Overview
- Manufacturer: Ford Motor Company
- Model code: C519; SA, ST (Australia)
- Production: 2018 – November 2025 (Europe); 2018–2024 (China); 2019–2026 (Taiwan)
- Assembly: Germany: Saarlouis (SB&A); China: Chongqing (Changan Ford); Harbin (Changan Ford, Focus Active); Taiwan: Zhongli (Ford Lio Ho)
- Designer: Jordan Demkiw

Body and chassis
- Class: Compact car/small family car (C)
- Body style: 5-door hatchback 5-door wagon 4-door saloon
- Layout: Front-engine, front-wheel-drive
- Platform: Ford C2
- Related: Ford Escape/Kuga; Ford Bronco Sport; Ford Maverick (2022)

Powertrain
- Engine: Petrol: 1.0 L EcoBoost (Fox) turbo I3; 1.0 L EcoBoost Hybrid Fox mHEV turbo I3; 1.5 L EcoBoost (Dragon) turbo I3; 1.5 L Ti-VCT I3; 1.5 L EcoBoost turbo I4 (China market); 2.3 L EcoBoost turbo I4; Diesel: 1.5 L EcoBlue (Panther) turbo I4; 2.0 L Duratorq TDCi I4; 2.0 L EcoBlue (Panther) turbo I4
- Electric motor: 11.5 kW (15.4 hp) belt-driven integrated starter/generator (BISG)
- Transmission: 6-speed manual; 6-speed automatic (1.5 Ti-VCT only); 7-speed 7F40 automatic (ST); 8-speed 8F24 automatic; 8-speed 8F35 automatic; 7-speed Powershift DCT
- Hybrid drivetrain: EcoBoost Hybrid mHEV
- Battery: 48-volt battery pack

Dimensions
- Wheelbase: 2,700 mm (106.3 in)
- Length: 4,378 mm (172.4 in) (hatchback); 4,668 mm (183.8 in) (estate); 4,647 mm (183.0 in) (saloon)
- Width: 1,825 mm (71.9 in)
- Height: 1,454 mm (57.2 in) (hatchback); 1,481 mm (58.3 in) (estate); 1,483 mm (58.4 in) (saloon)
- Curb weight: 1,235–1,518 kg (2,722.7–3,346.6 lb) (hatchback); 1,383–1,559 kg (3,049.0–3,437.0 lb) (estate); 1,239–1,408 kg (2,731.5–3,104.1 lb) (saloon)

Chronology
- Predecessor: Ford Focus (third generation)

The fourth generation Ford Focus, also known as the Focus Mk IV (codename: C519), is a small family car which was produced by Ford from 2018 until 2025. It was revealed in April 2018 to replace the third-generation Focus. As in the previous generation, the model is available with hatchback, wagon, saloon body styles. This generation marked the demise of the Focus line-up in many regions, including North/South America and Southeast Asia, effectively limiting its market reach to just Europe, China, Taiwan, Australasia, and other minor markets.

== Overview ==
On 10 April 2018, Ford unveiled the European- and Asian-market versions of the fourth-generation Focus. It is underpinned by the Ford C2 platform, an evolution of the C1 platform used on previous iterations of the car and 20 percent stiffer in torsional rigidity. The Mk4 Focus also features a weight reduction of up to 88 kg (194 lb) compared with the Mk3. As the wheelbase is extended by 53 mm (2.1 in), Ford designers managed to position the wheels higher up into the sheet metal, reducing the perception of overall length and mass.

At launch, six trim levels were available for the car, which consisted of the Active, Ambiente, ST-Line, Titanium, Trend and Vignale. The Vignale trim is given satin aluminium finishes for the roof rails, fascia and rocker inserts, as well as a signature grille mesh. Only the ST-Line and Titanium trims were introduced in China.

For interior space, shoulder-room for rear passengers has been increased by nearly 61 millimetres (2.4 in) and knee clearance and legroom has been improved by 51 millimetres (2.0 in) and 71 millimetres (2.8 in) respectively. For the Estate model, the load height in the boot has been increased by 43 mm (1.7 in), while overall capacity is 1,650 litres (58 cu ft).

Ford of Europe have said that they intend to cease production of the model in 2025 as their product line shifts towards electric vehicles, with the company investigating other possible uses for the Saarlouis factory in Germany following the Focus's discontinuation, including selling the facility to another manufacturer.

== Body styles ==
=== Hatchback ===
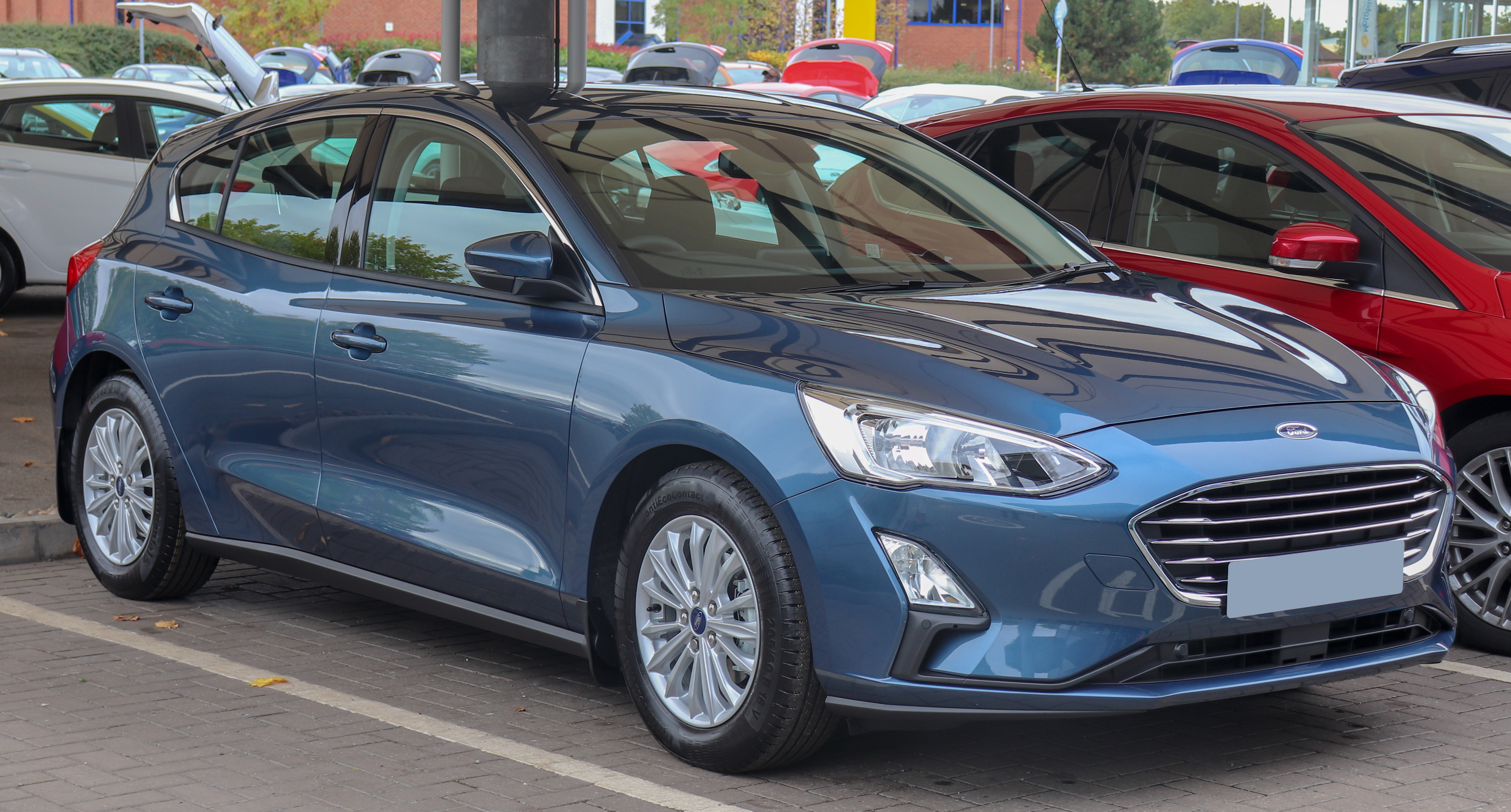
2018 Ford Focus Titanium (UK)

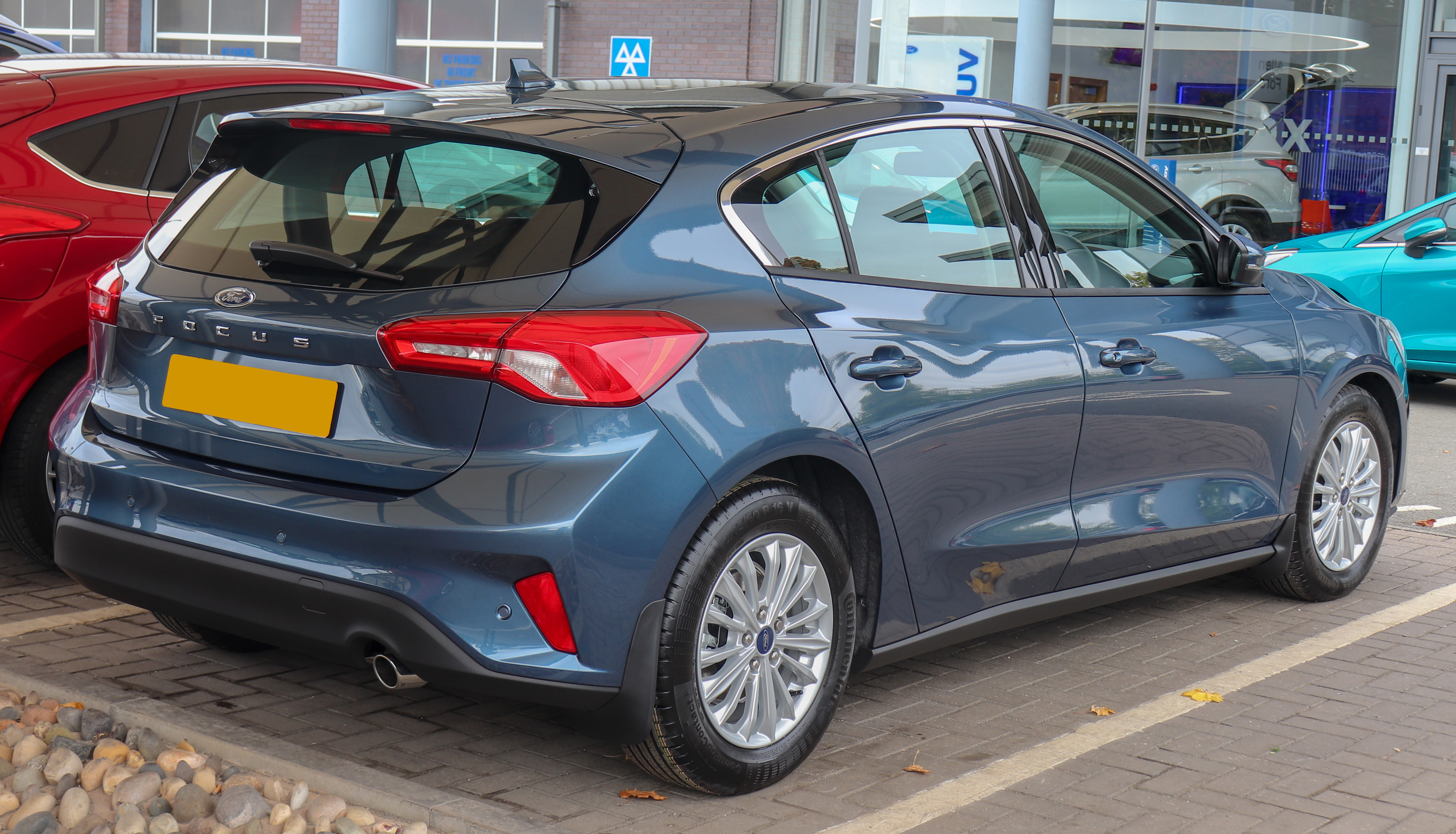
2018 Ford Focus Titanium (UK)

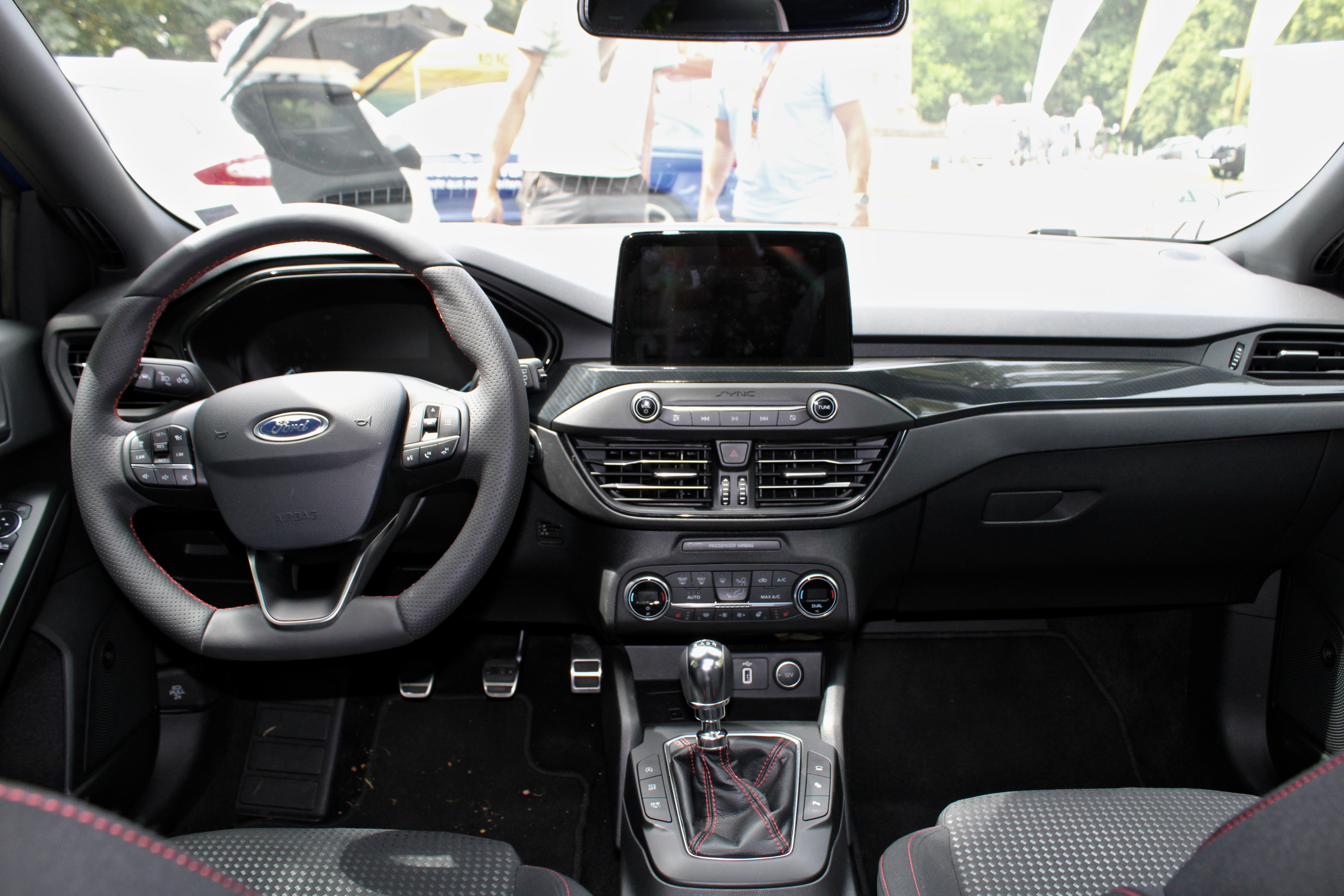
Interior

=== Estate ===
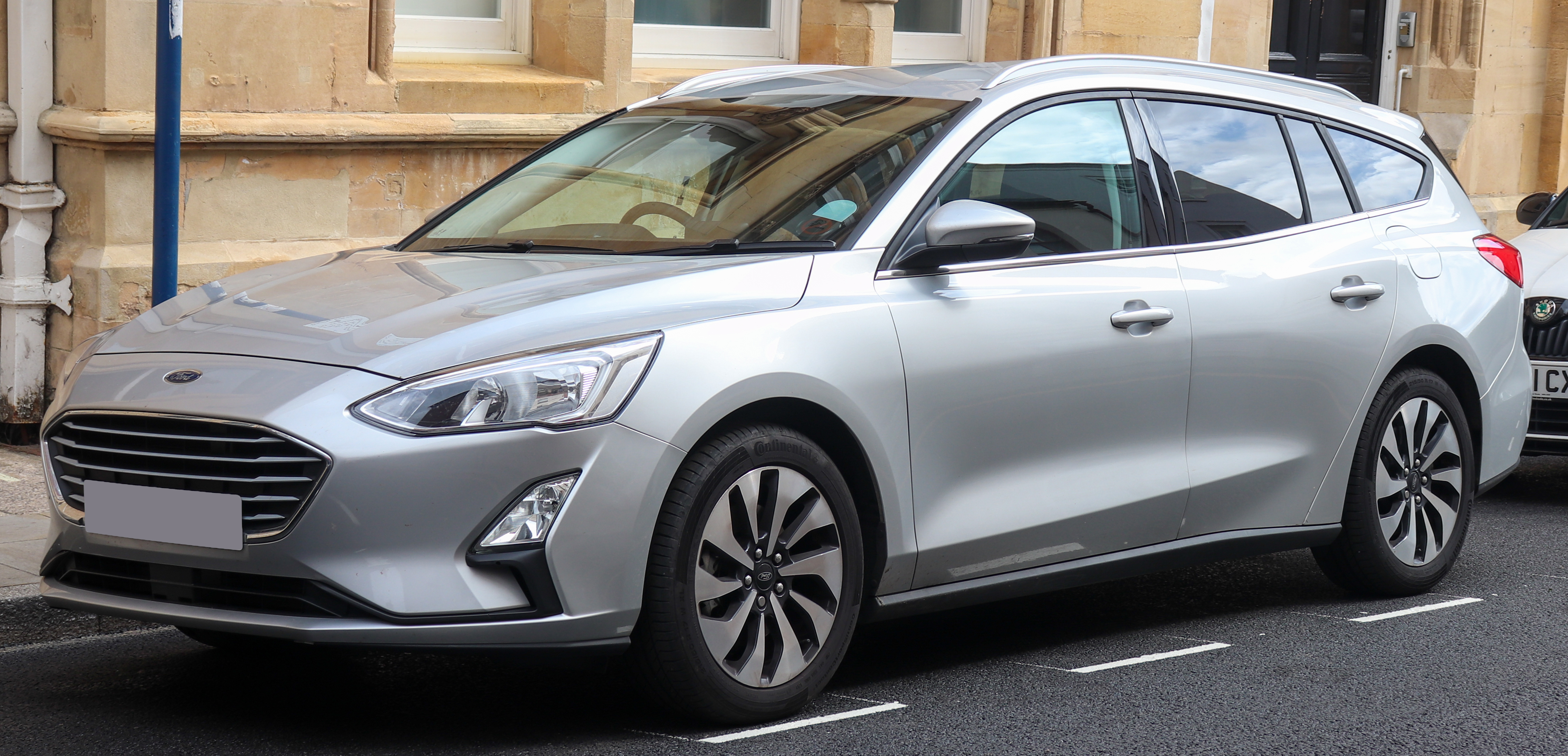
2019 Ford Focus Zetec (UK)

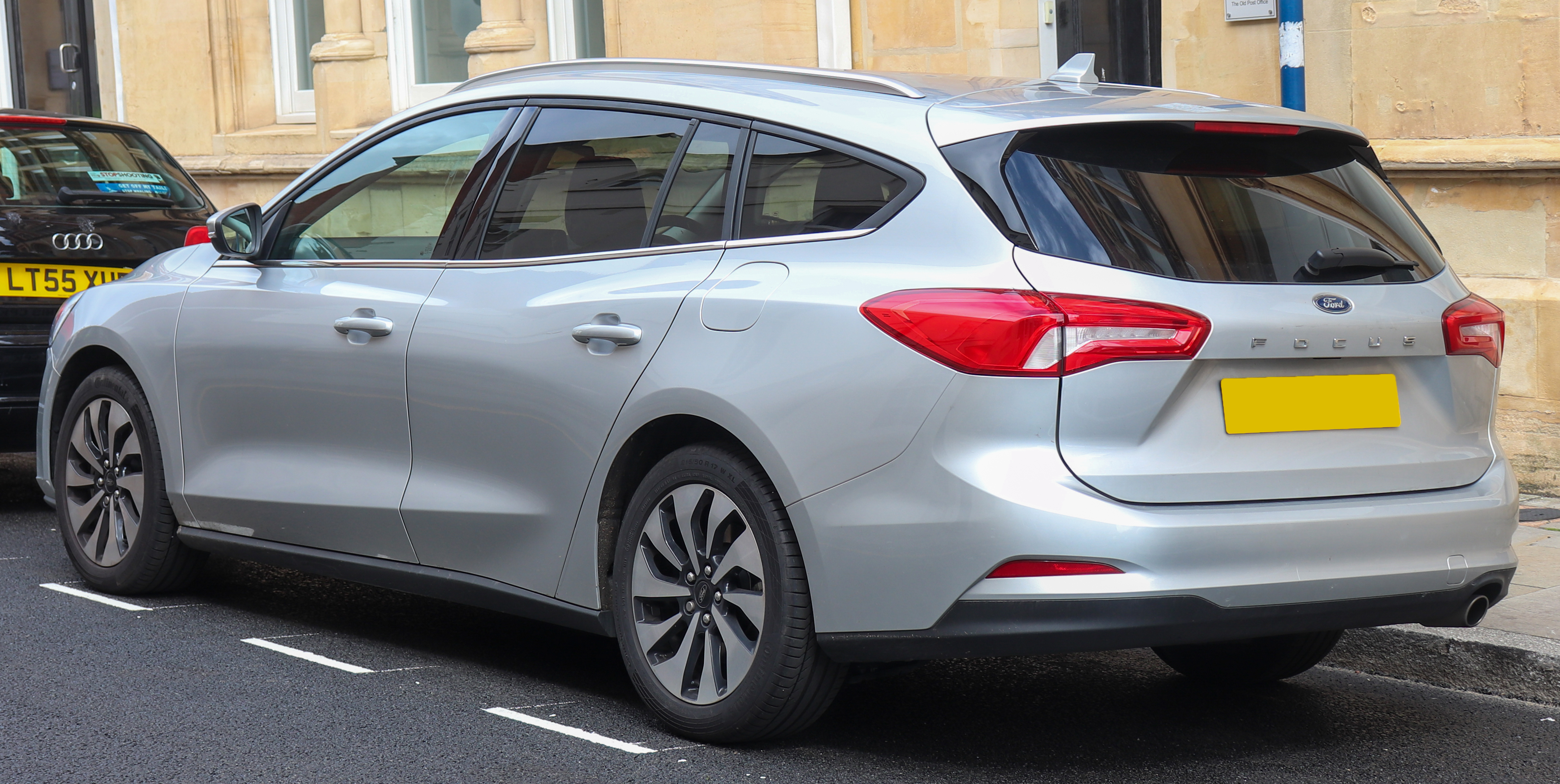
2019 Ford Focus Zetec (UK)

=== Saloon ===
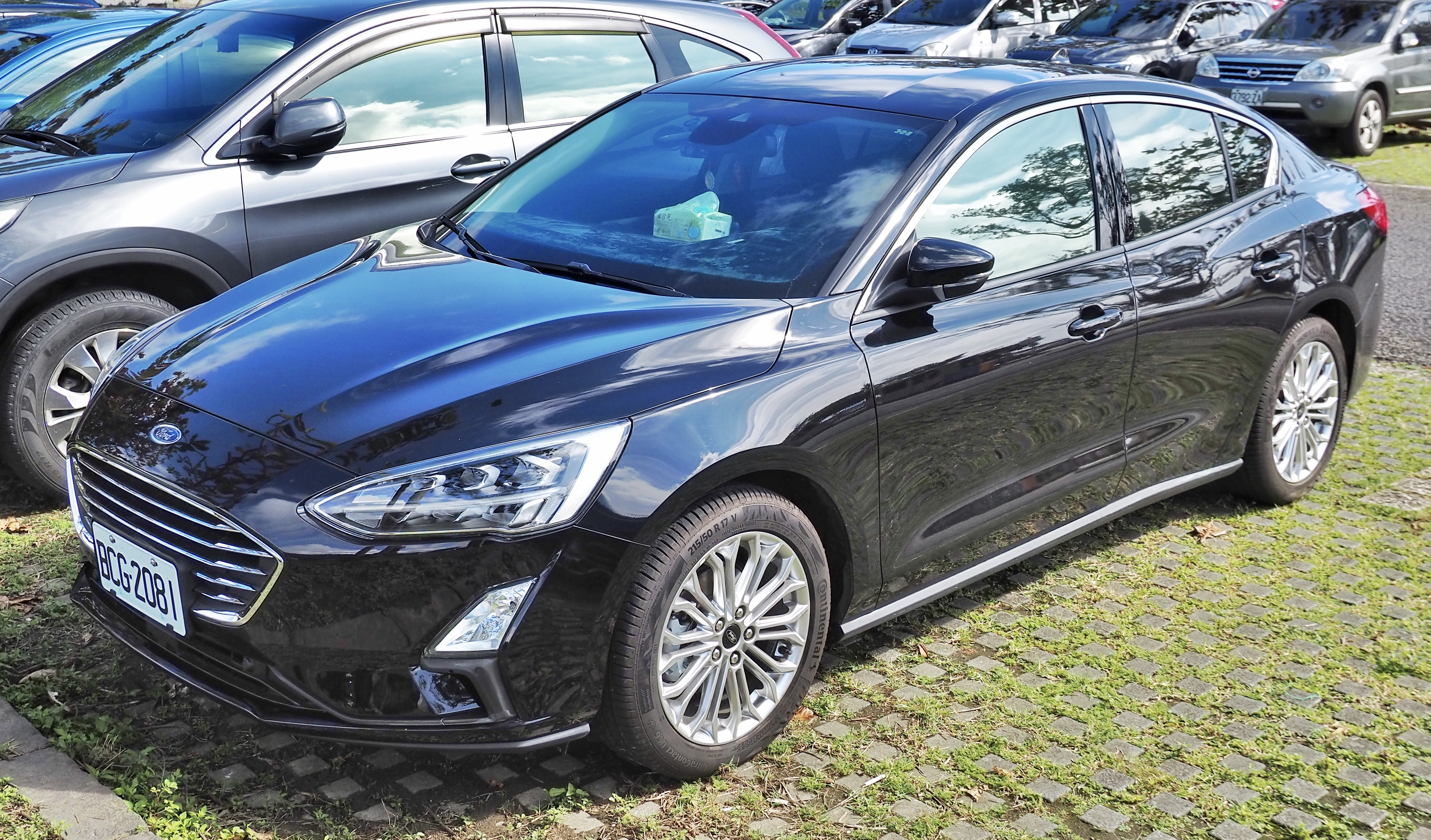
2018 Ford Focus (Taiwan)

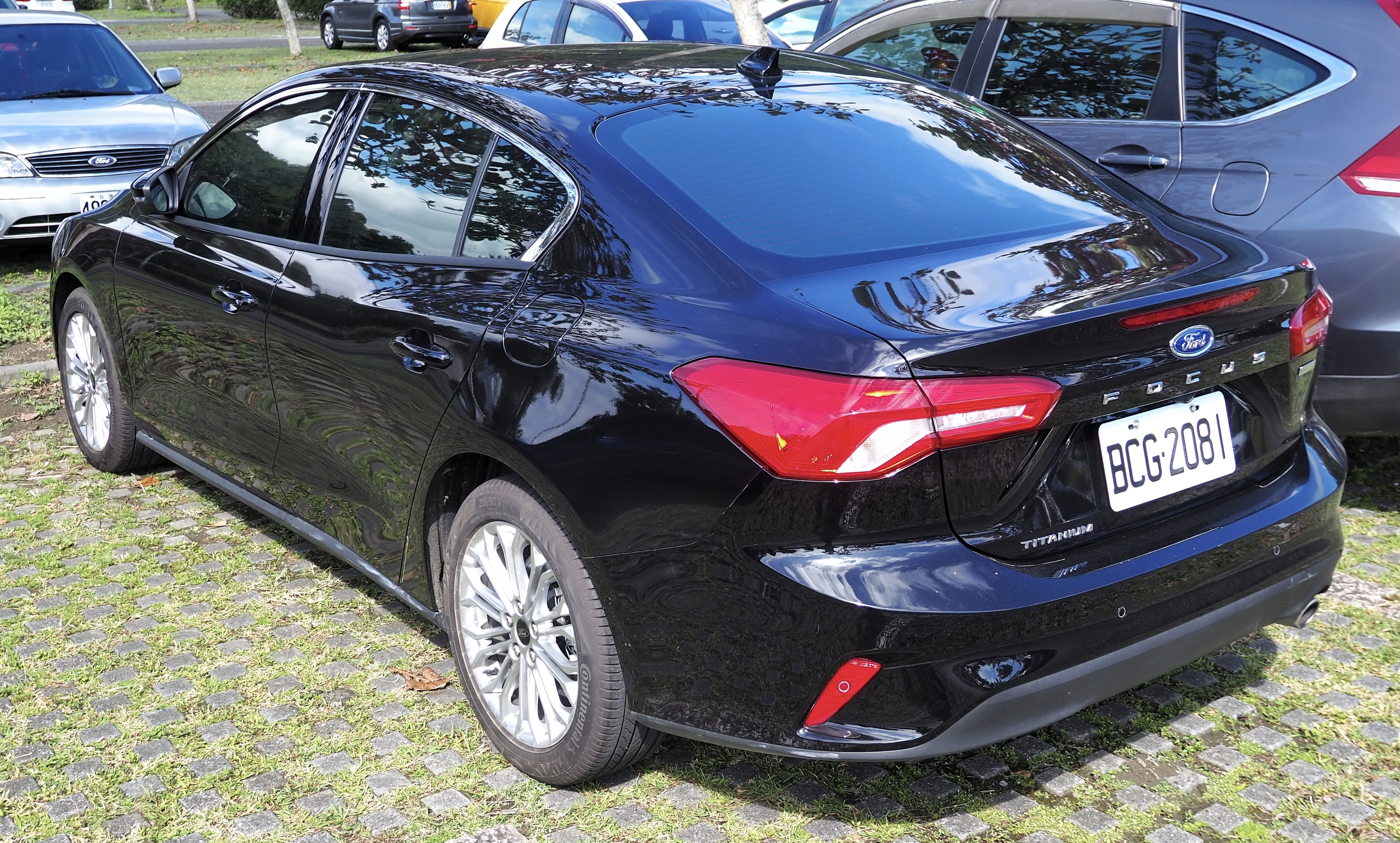
2018 Ford Focus (Taiwan)

== Models ==
=== ST-Line ===
The ST-Line trim level includes dark-finished 17-inch wheels, a sports body kit, large diffuser, functional roof spoiler, lower wing elements, and polished twin tailpipes.

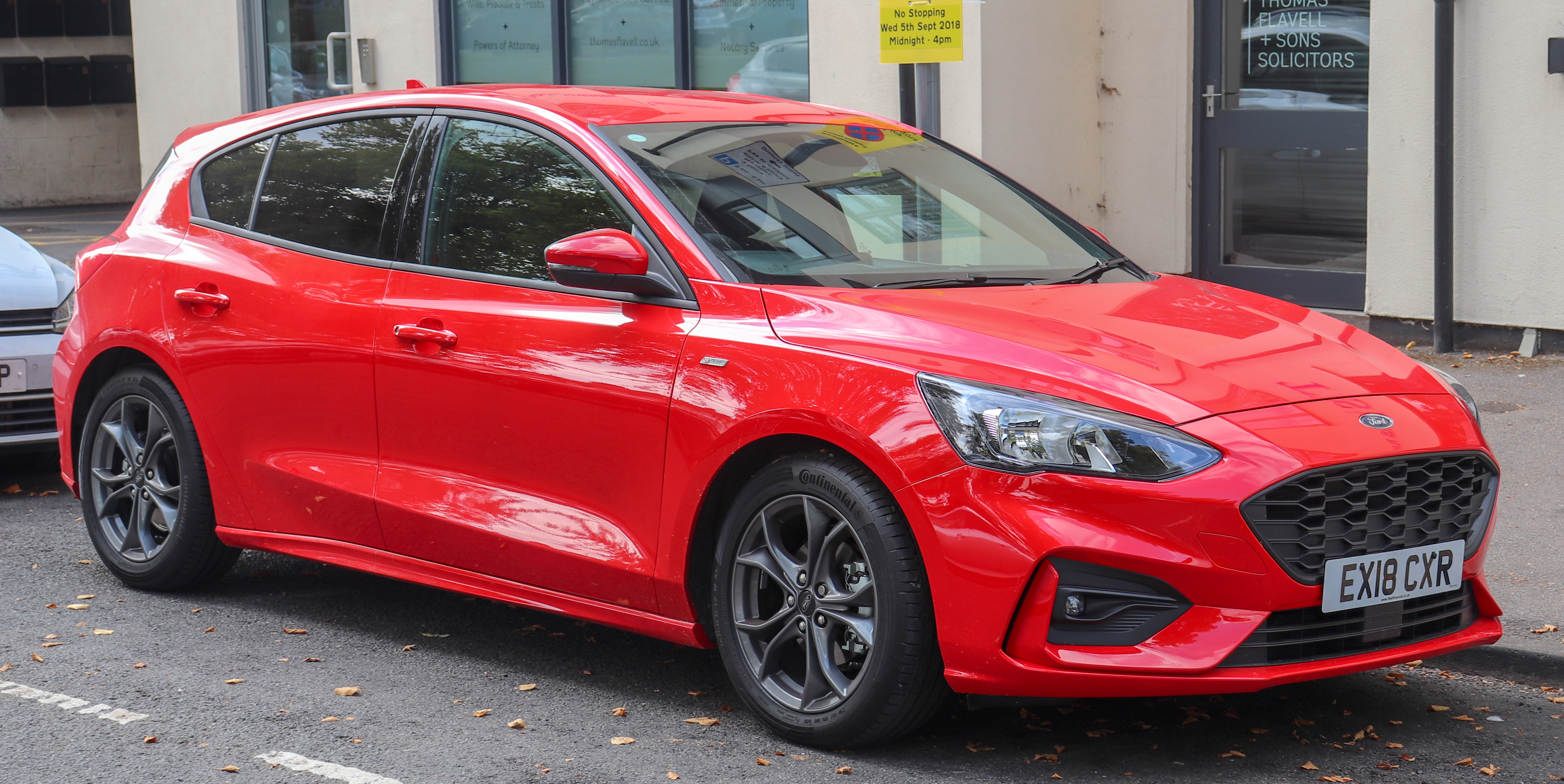
2018 Ford Focus ST-Line (UK)

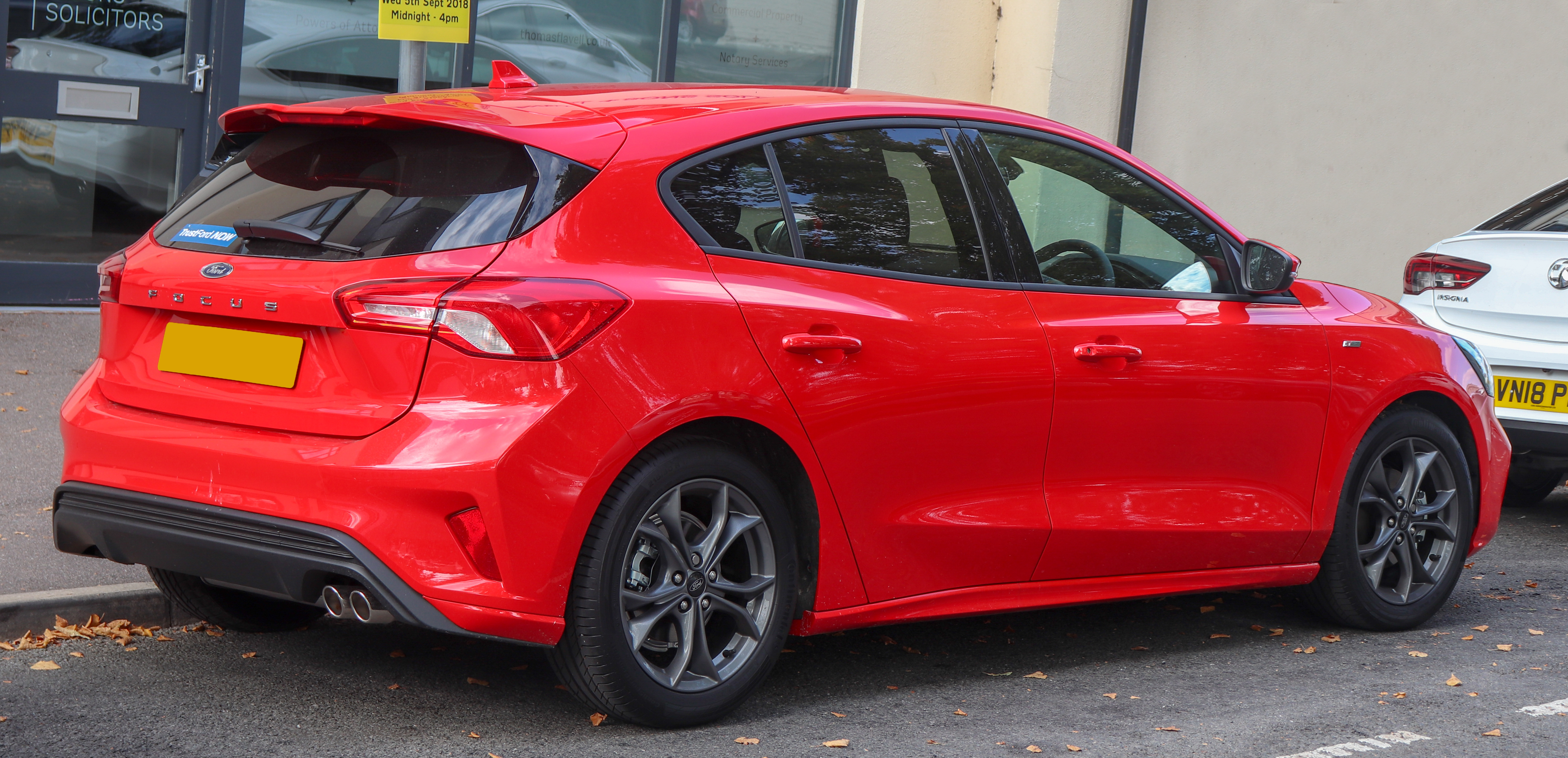
2018 Ford Focus ST-Line (UK)

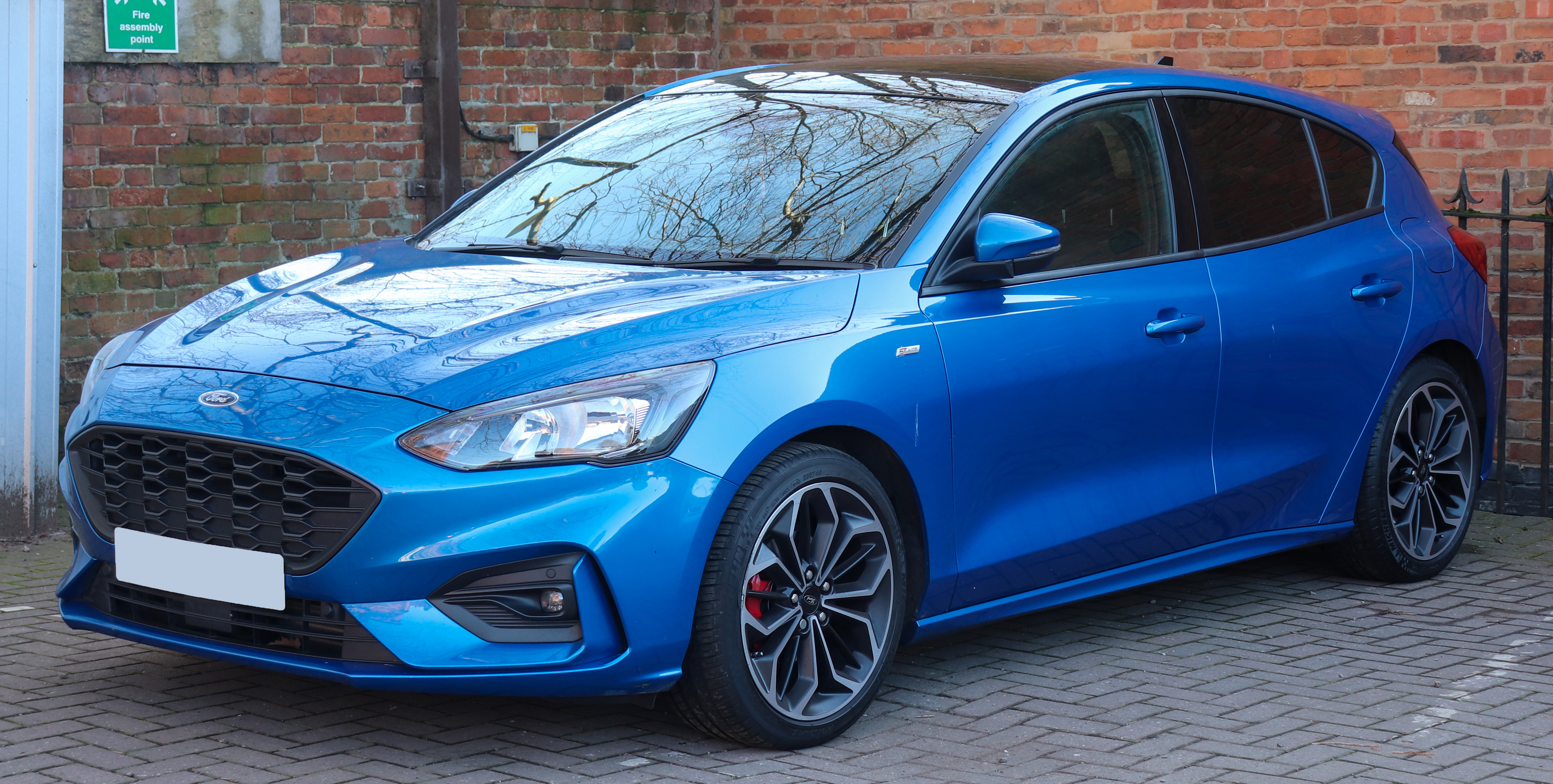
2018 Ford Focus ST-Line X (UK)

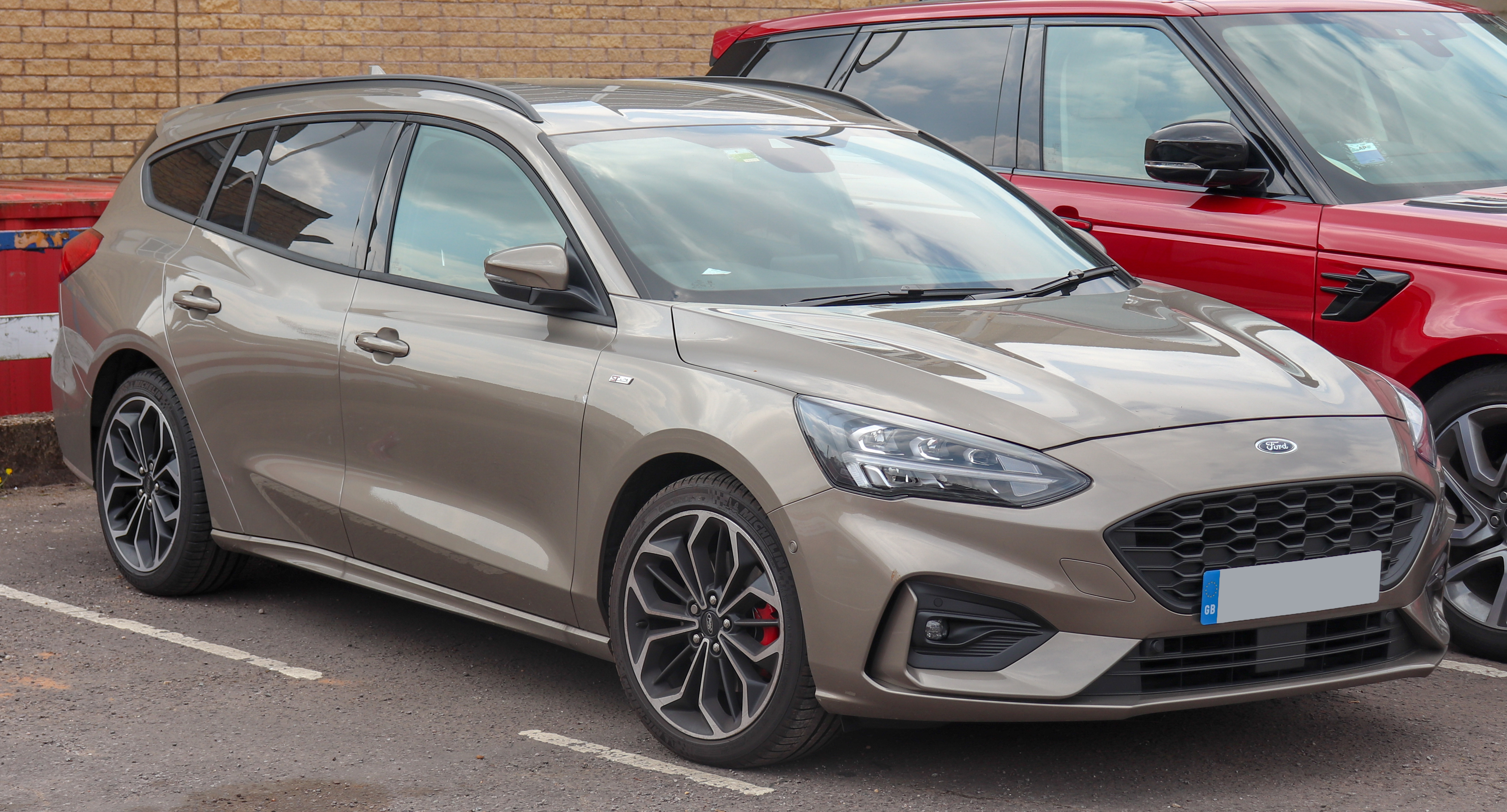
2019 Ford Focus ST-Line X estate (UK)

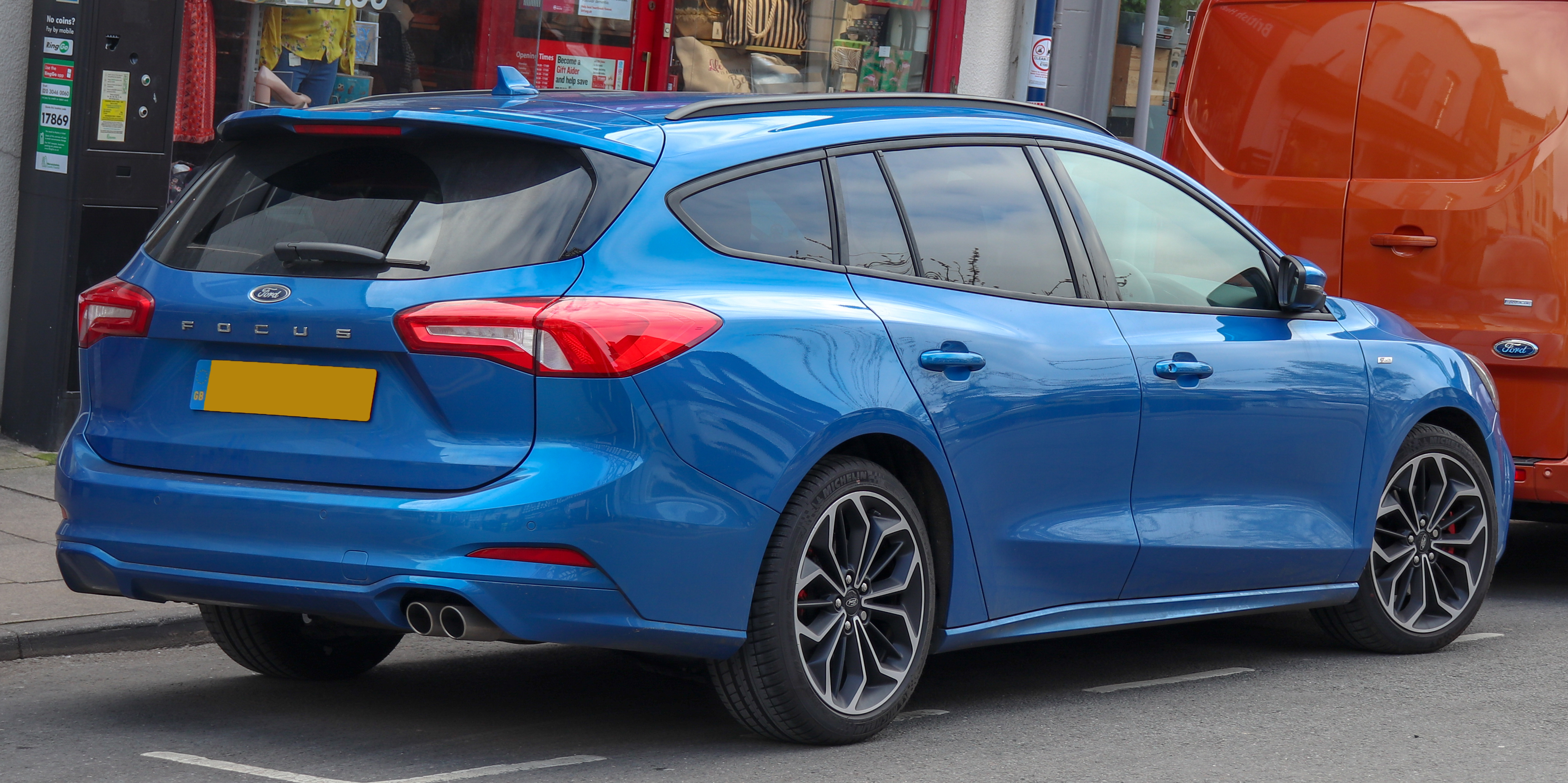
2018 Ford Focus ST-Line X estate (UK)

=== Vignale ===
The Vignale trim level is a luxury-oriented version of the Focus. It offers extra equipment and styling changes, such as satin aluminium elements and a signature Vignale mesh grille. It has 18-inch wheels, leather interior trim, a heads-up display, the ability to park itself in a space, and a Bang & Olufsen sound system.

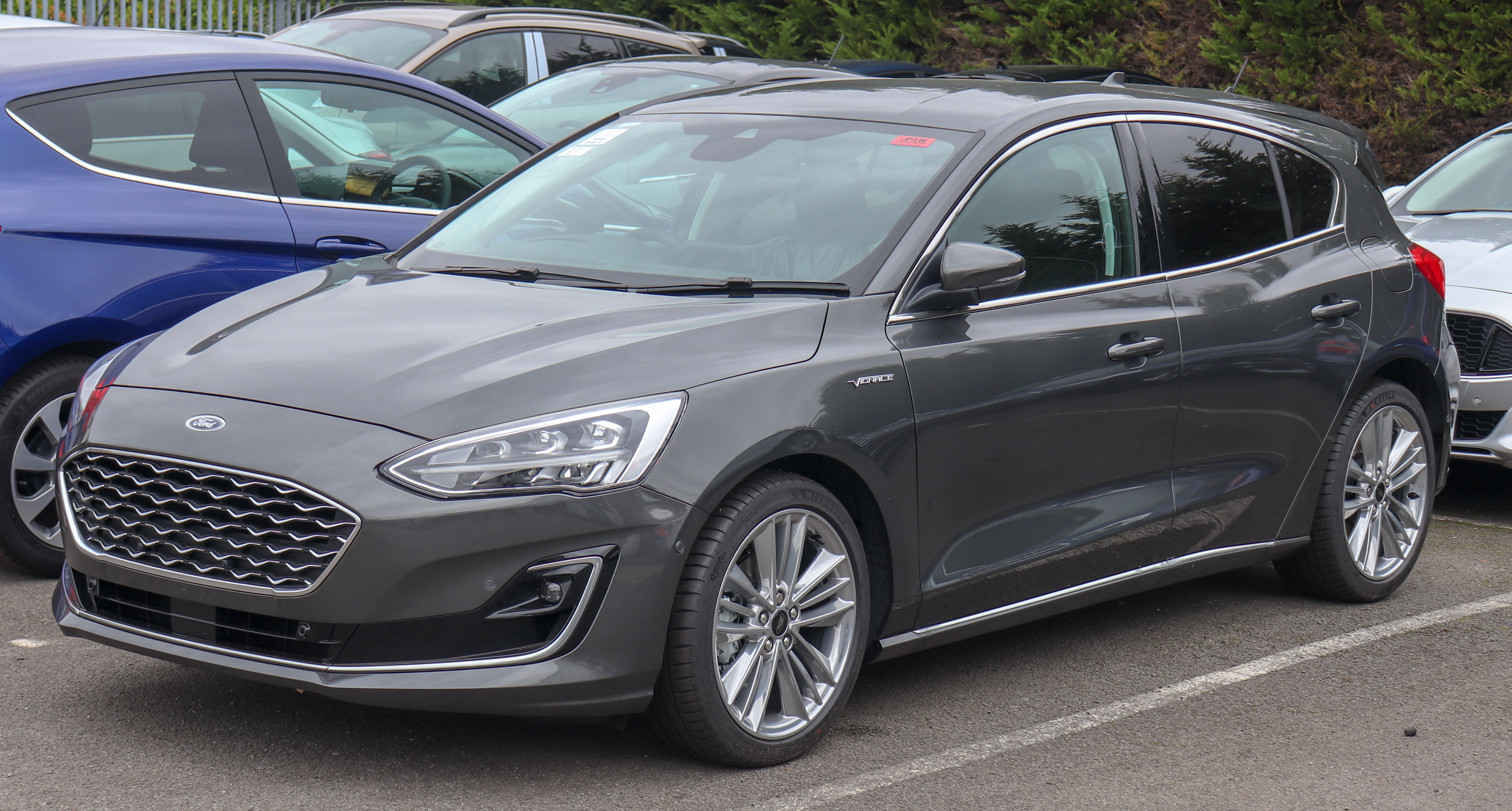
2018 Ford Focus Vignale hatchback (UK)

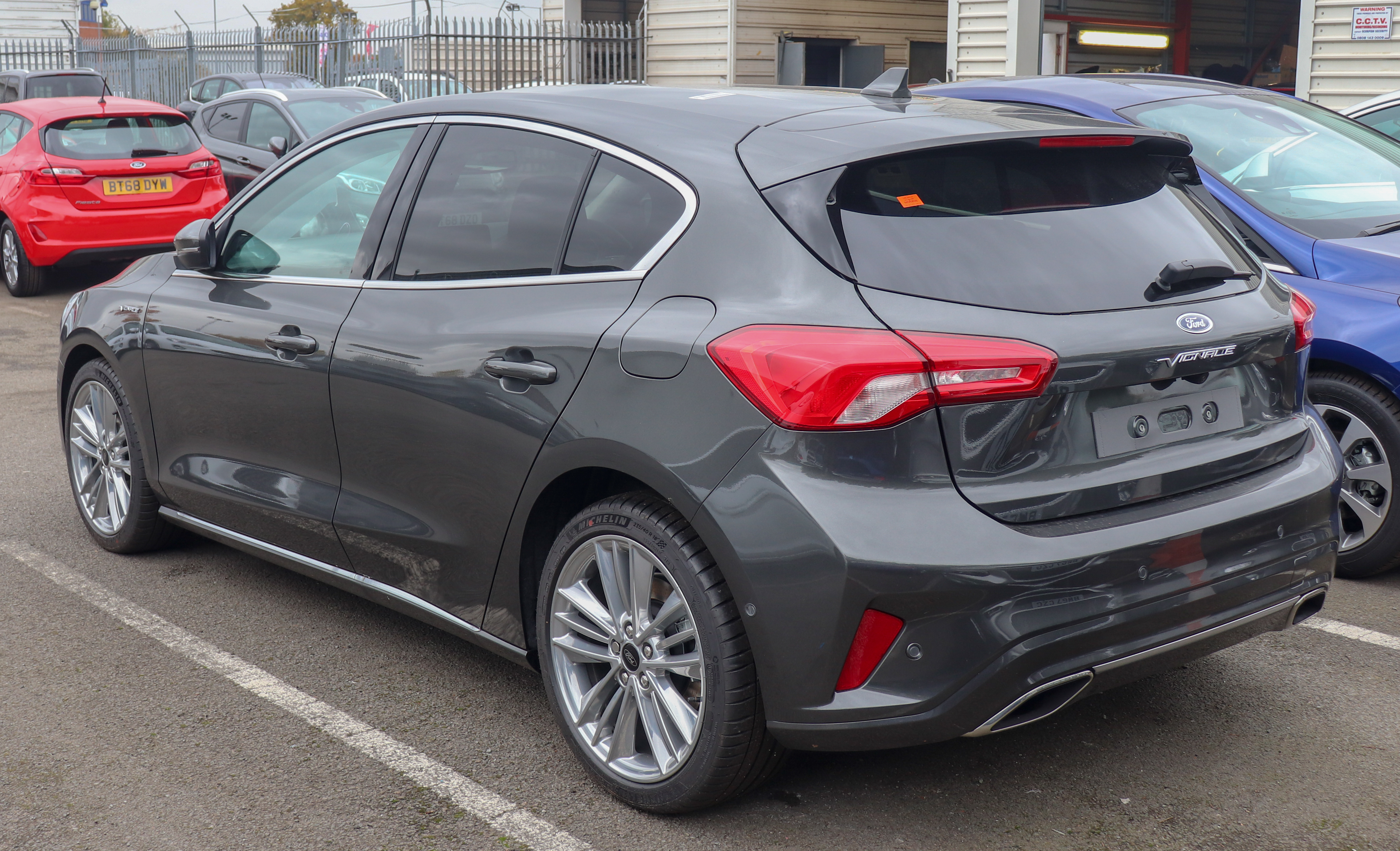
2018 Ford Focus Vignale hatchback (UK)

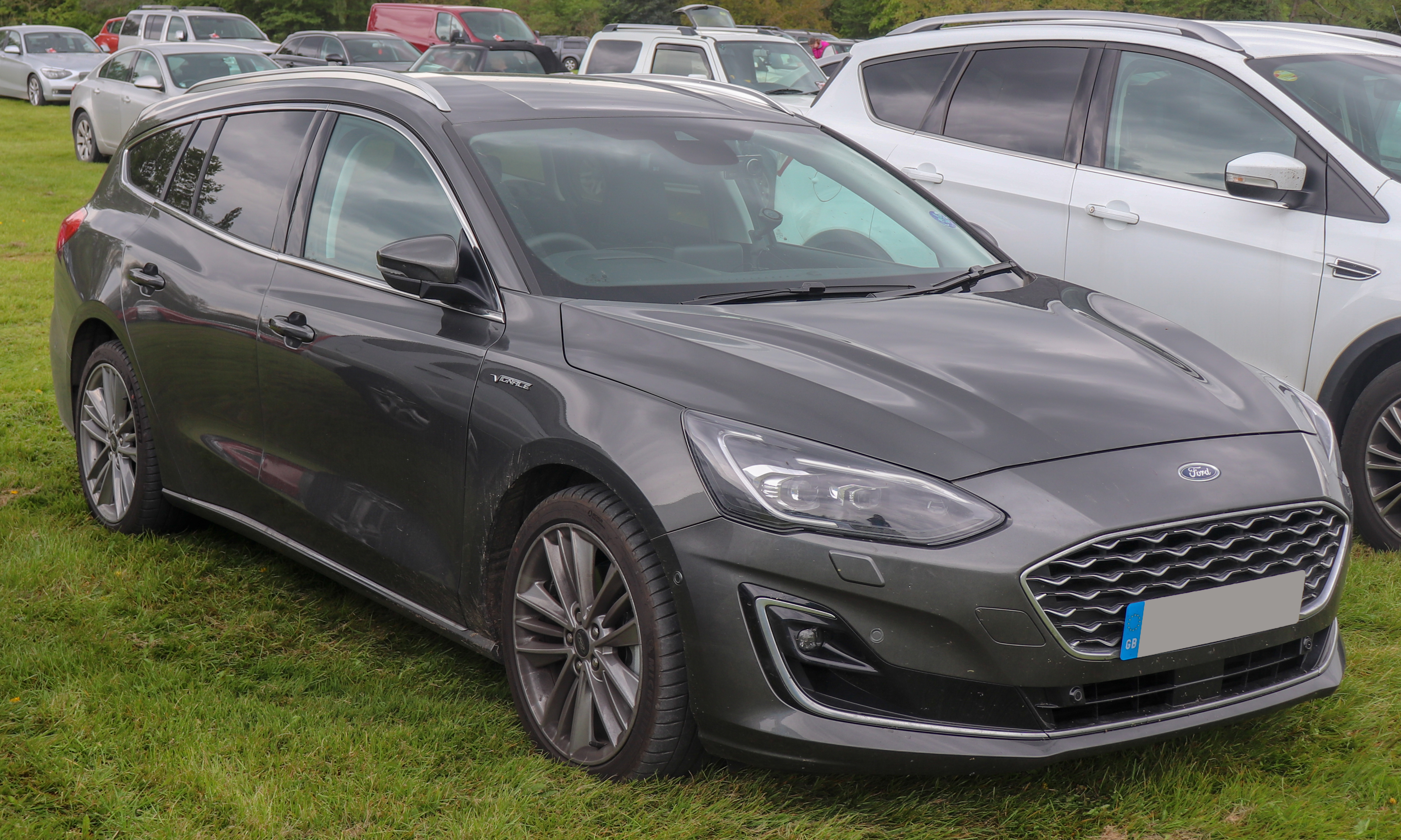
2019 Ford Focus Vignale estate (UK)

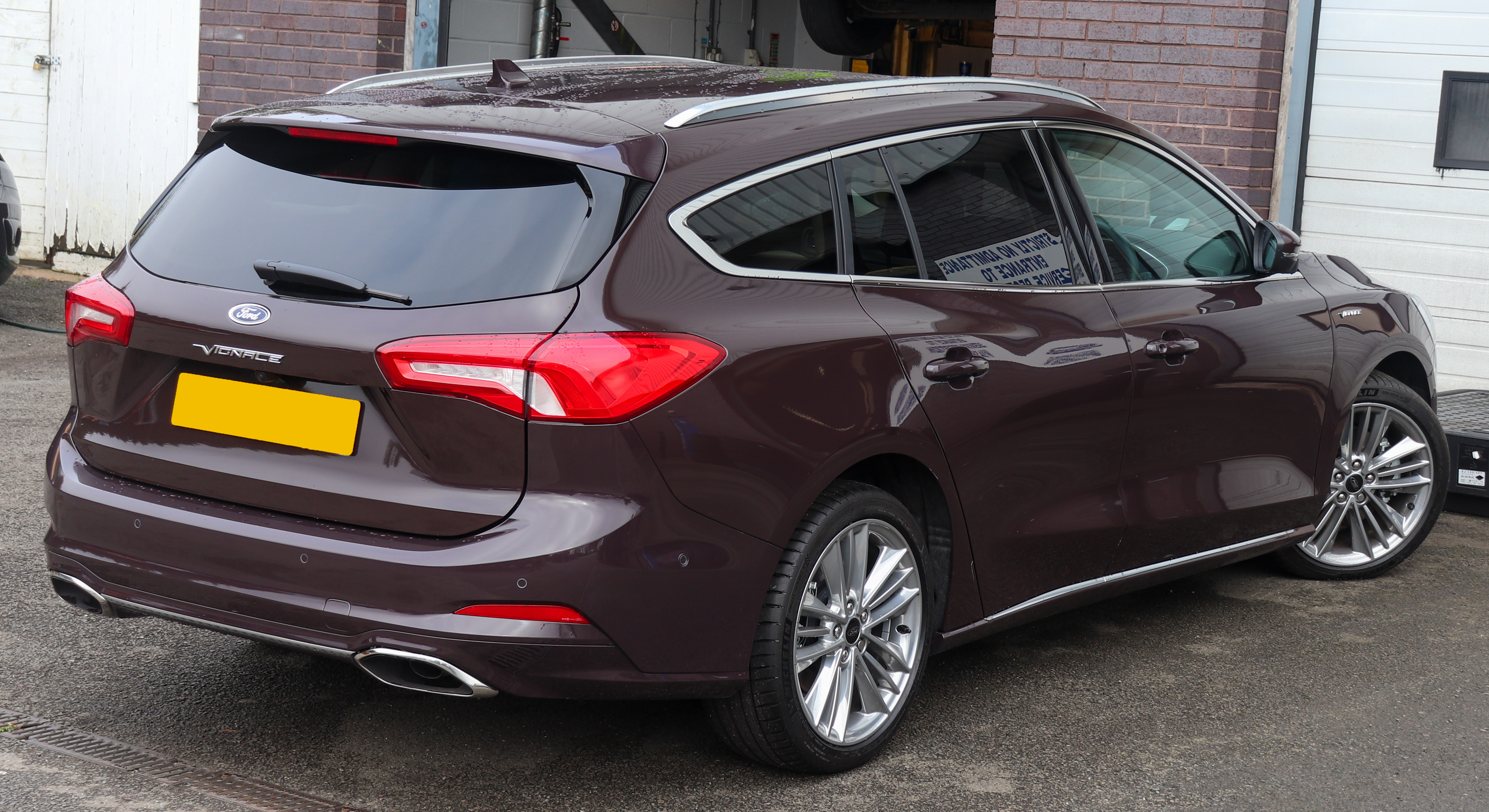
2019 Ford Focus Vignale estate (UK)

=== Active ===
The Active trim level is a crossover-styled version of the Focus. To give a rugged styling to the car, it features bespoke front end design, off-road styled accessories such as black protective wheel arches and rocker claddings and front/rear skid plates. The ground clearance is also lifted by 30 mm (1.2 in). This model is available in hatchback and station wagon body styles.

In China, the estate model was released in November 2020 with a reworked front fascia and marketed as the Focus Shooting Brake.

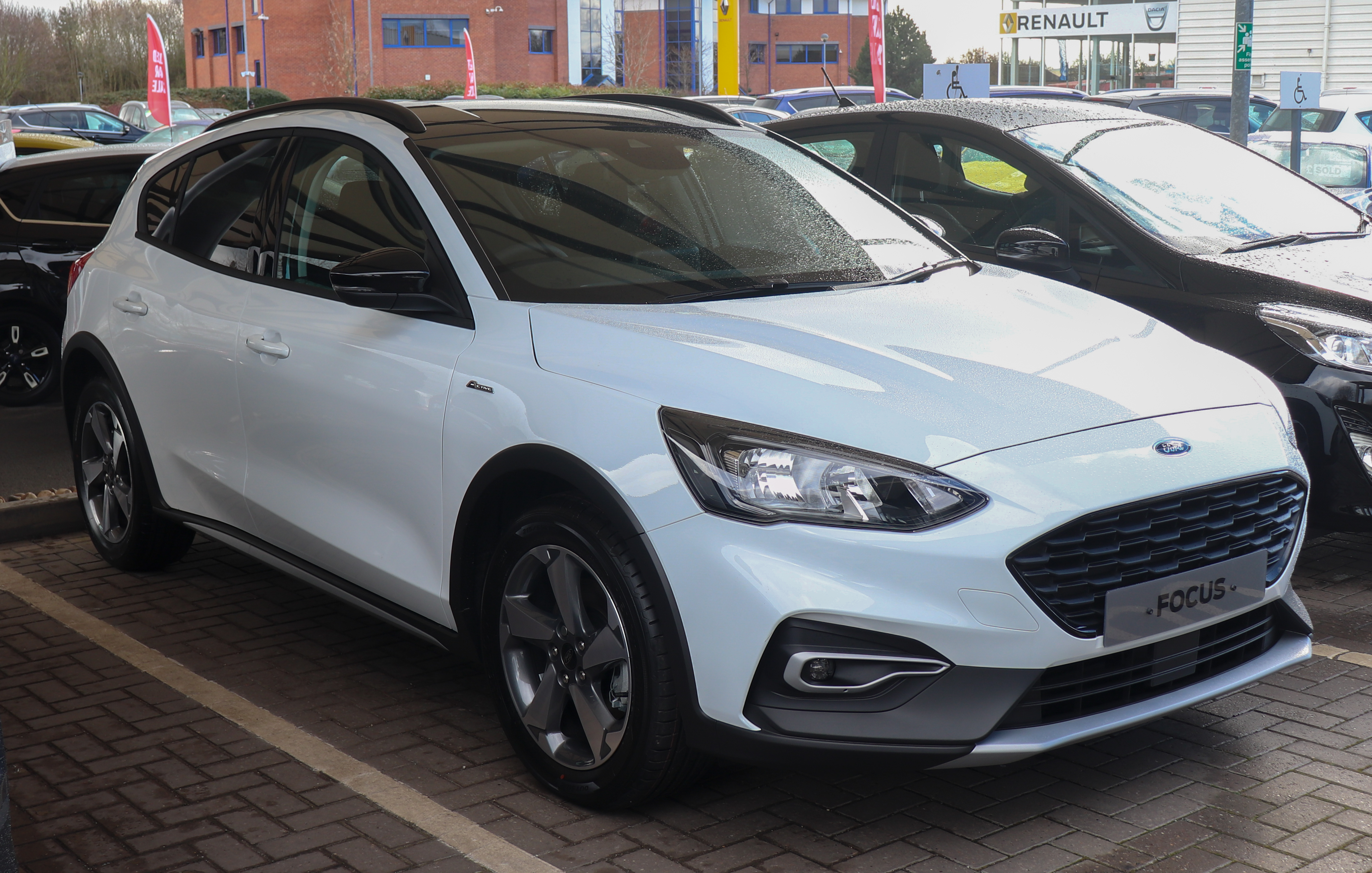
2019 Ford Focus Active hatchback (UK)

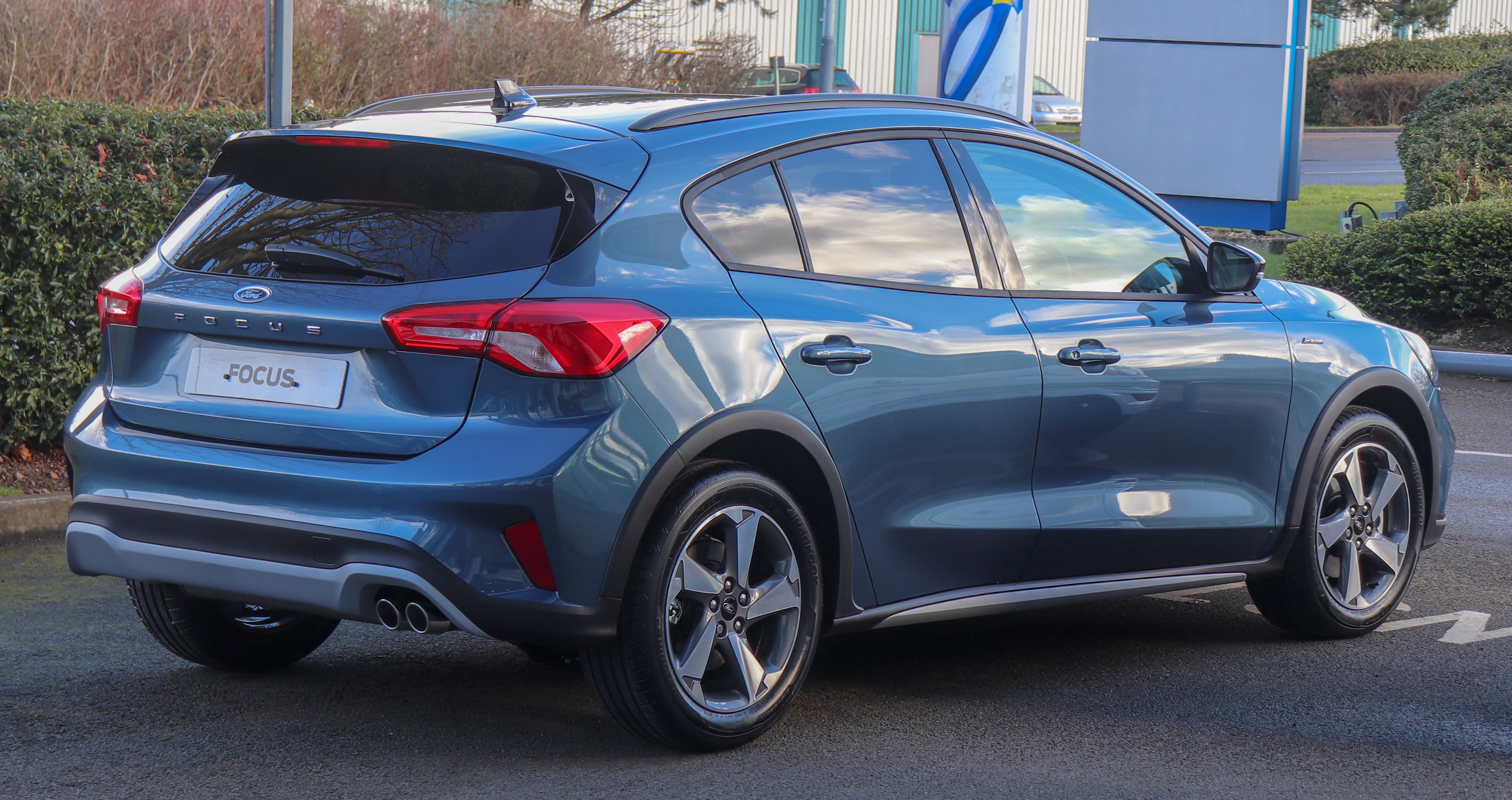
2019 Ford Focus Active hatchback (UK)

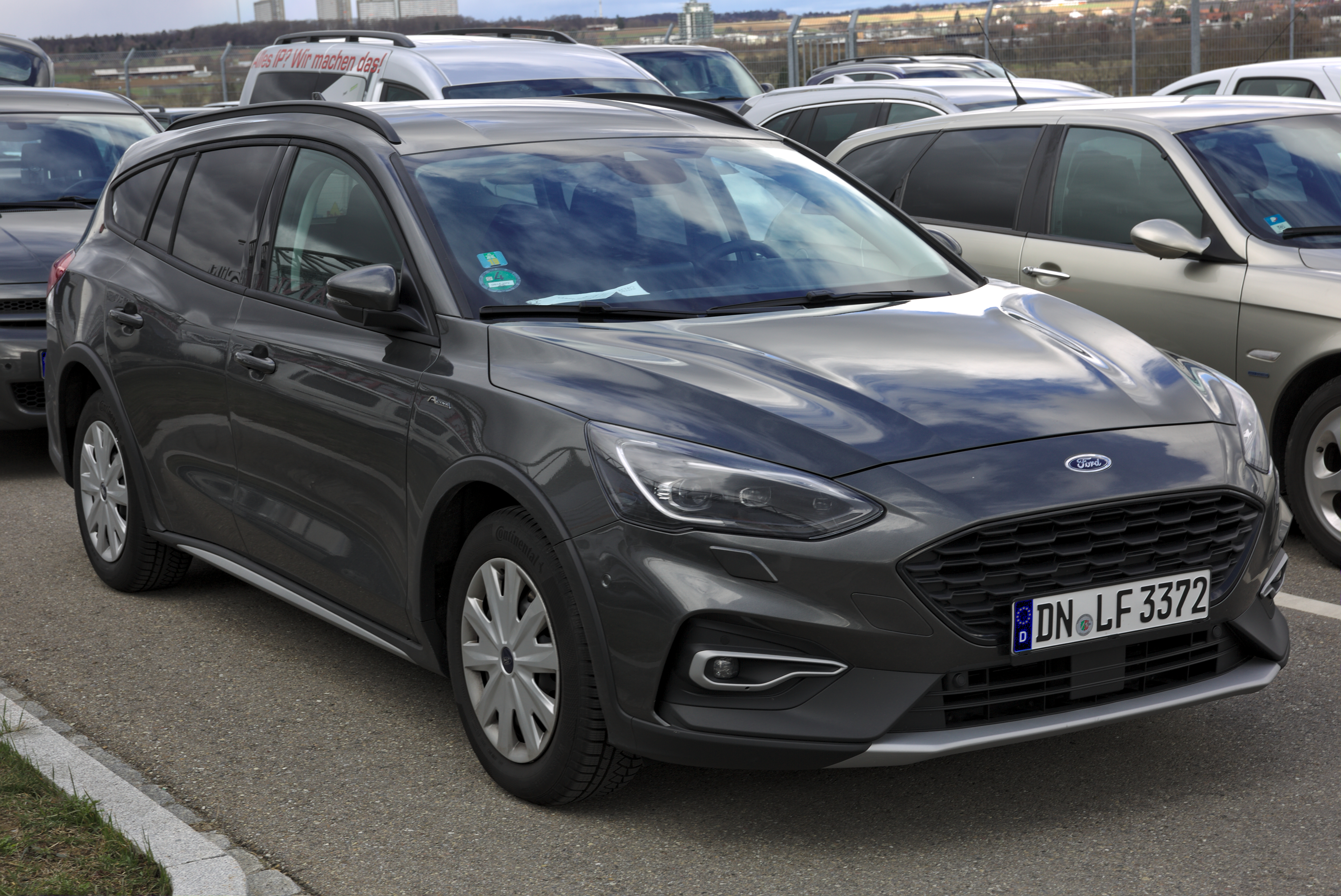
2020 Ford Focus Active estate (Germany)

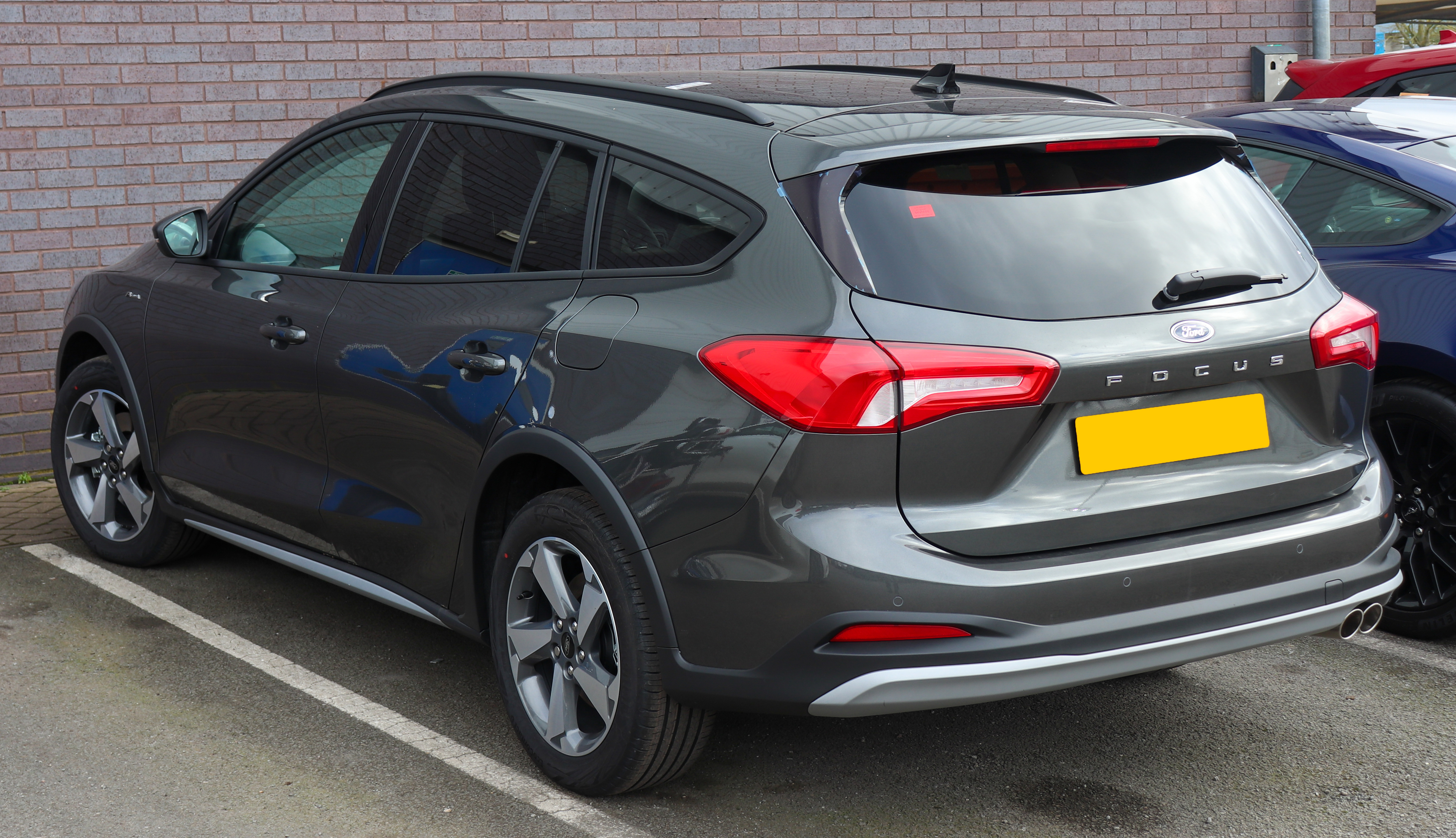
2020 Ford Focus Active estate (UK)

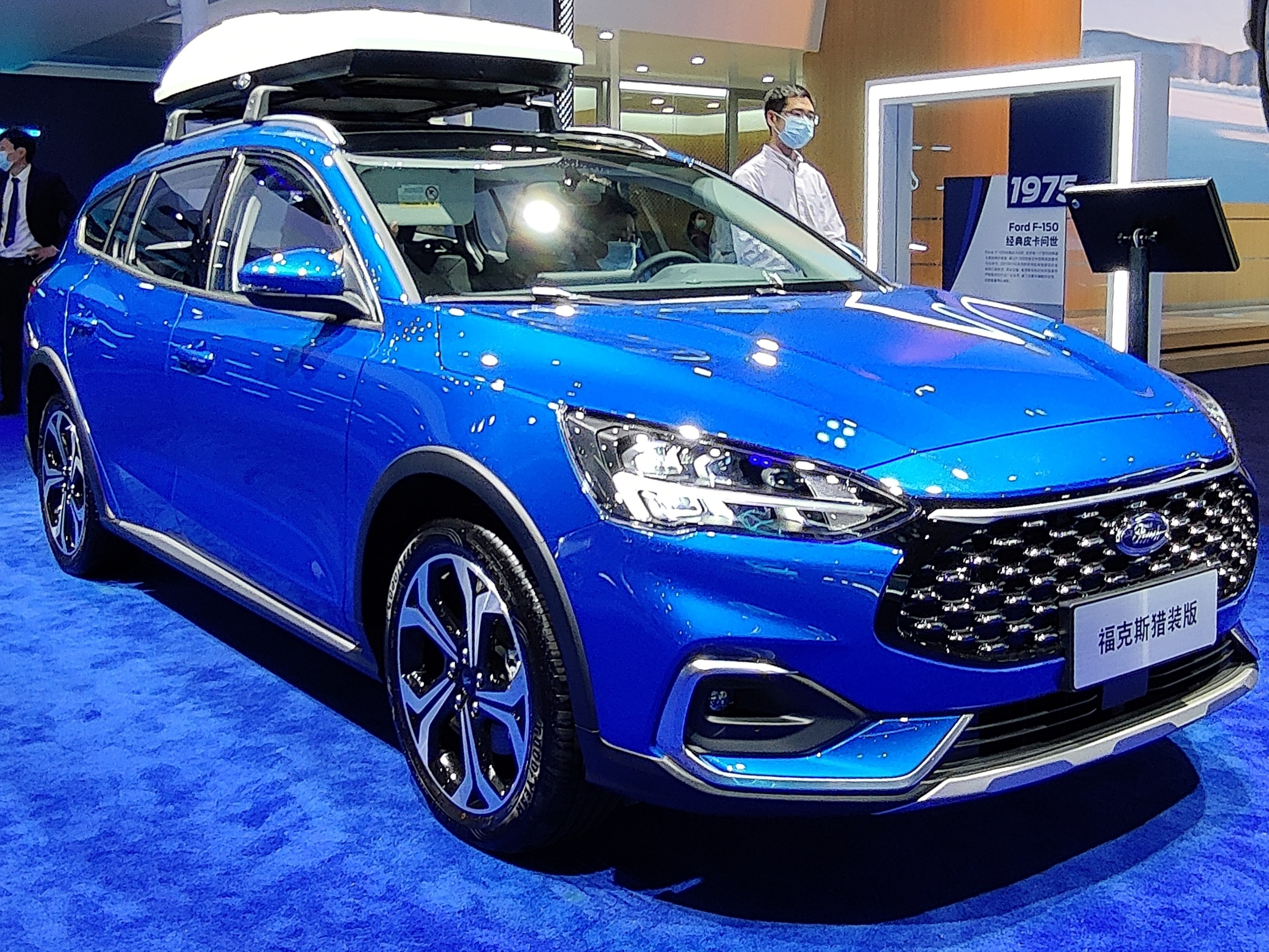
2021 Ford Focus Shooting Brake (China)

=== ST ===
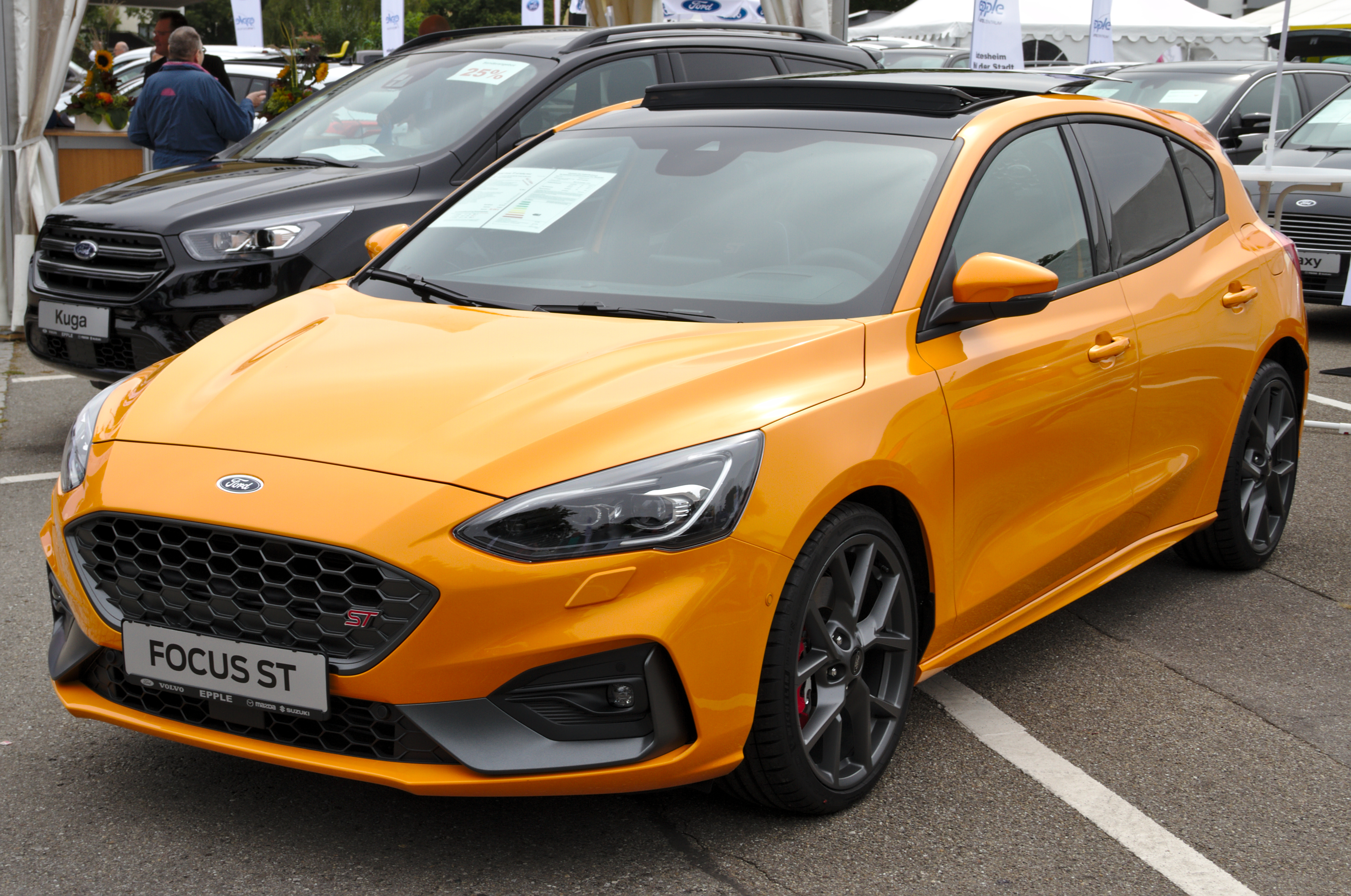

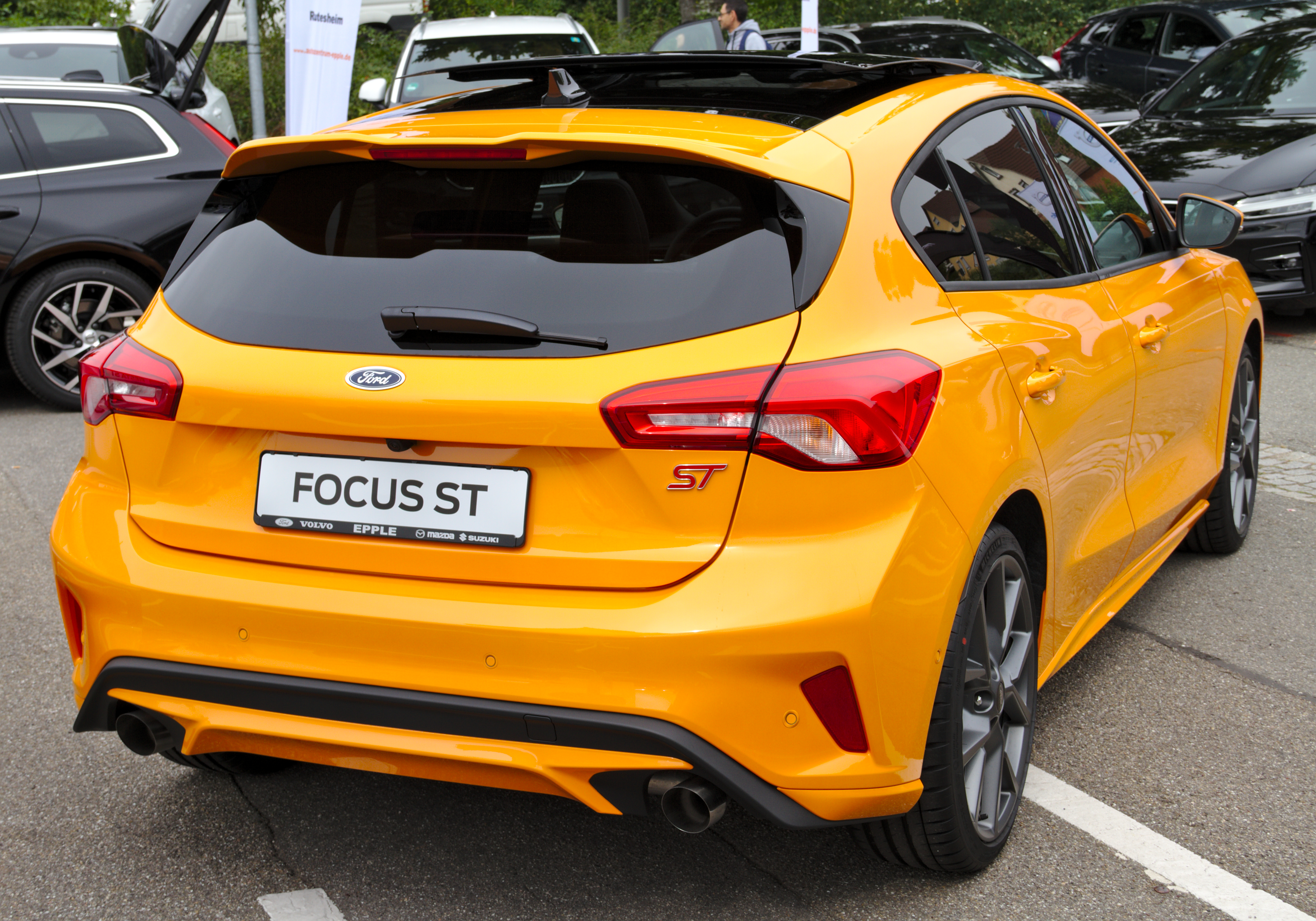
Focus ST

In February 2019, Ford announced the fourth-generation Focus ST for the European market. It was launched in mid-2019.

The Focus ST is offered with a choice of either a 2.3-litre EcoBoost turbocharged petrol engine with a 280 PS (276 hp; 206 kW) power output or a 2.0-litre EcoBlue diesel engine with a 190 PS (187 hp; 140 kW) power output. As standard, all models come with a MMT-6 six-speed manual transmission however a new performance-optimized seven-speed automatic transmission (which includes wheel-mounted paddle-shifters, based on Ford 8F40 transmission without 2nd gear) is going to be also available as an option in the near future.

The EcoBoost variant of the new Focus ST is the first front-wheel-drive Ford model to feature an electronic limited-slip differential (eLSD). New Steering Torque Disturbance Reduction software for EPAS, unique steering knuckle geometry with an anti-lag system are also implemented to aid with power delivery.

EcoBoost equipped variants benefit from Continuously Controlled Damping (CCD) for enhanced suspension performance.

Larger brakes (f 330 mm 2-pot, r 302 mm) with improved fade resistance now sports Electric Brake Booster (EBB) for more consistent pedal feel across operating conditions (i.e. high performance driving).

On the exterior, the Focus ST features a revised grille, unique 18- or 19-inch alloy wheels, larger rear spoiler and twin-exit tailpipes (petrol model only, the diesel has the polished twin tailpipe as the ST-Line due to the AdBlue tank). Interior changes include Recaro front seats, aluminium gear knob, pedals and scuff plates, and decorative elements with grey stitching.

Like the Fiesta ST, an optional "Performance Pack" is available. The package includes launch control, shift light indicator, rev-matching for the manual EcoBoost variant, Track driving mode, electronically adjustable dampers with potholes detection, red-painted brake callipers and ambient interior lightning.

In August 2021, Ford unveiled a new, special edition version of the Focus ST called the "Edition", limited to 300 cars for UK and 200 for Europe. It constists of 2.3‑litre EcoBoost petrol engine, six-speed manual with hydraulically-activated electronic limited-slip differential (eLSD), 4 selectable Drive Modes (including Track Mode), uprated KW suspension for 50% stiffer powder coated springs with manually adjustable ride height (-10 mm from factory, further -15 mm possible), manually adjustable KW V3 coilovers (12 c, 16 r) and 10% lighter flow-formed alloy 19" wheels. Only available in Azura Blue, with Gloss Black detailing including roof, rear spoiler, rear diffuser, mirror caps, wheels and badging. All of this should make the ST Edition help enthusiasts optimise driving dynamics – including special Nürburgring setting.

In September 2022, Ford revealed "Track Pack" for updated Focus ST. This adds to Edition spec Pirelli P Zero Corsas tyres, front 4-pot 363 mm brakes from Mach-E and new Ford Performance seats. Aesthetically Track Pack retains black accents for this once with different exterior colours. All of this should make the ST Track Pack more resilient on track days.

In April 2024, Ford introduced "Edition" for updated Focus ST. It combines 2.3‑litre EcoBoost petrol engine, six-speed manual, KW coilover adjustable suspension set to Nurburgring setting, front 4-pot 363 mm brakes, flow-formed alloy 19" wheels and Pirelli P Zero Corsas tyres. Comfort part is ensured by standard fitment of (based on most ordered options) Driver Assist pack, 675 W B&O Premium Sound System and Winter Pack. Exterior colour is Azura Blue with High Gloss Black accents. Inside there is Motion Blue stitching for the Ford Performance seats, steering wheel, gear shift gaiter, centre console knee pads and floor mats. All of this should make it the most complete road- and track- ready version.

== 2022 refresh ==
In June 2022, the Focus received an update in Europe which includes the addition of a new electrified powertrain and some minor changes to the equipment list. A mild hybrid powertrain was introduced, which is called the EcoBoost Hybrid engine, a mild hybrid version of Ford's 1.0-litre turbocharged three-cylinder with 125 PS (123 hp; 92 kW) and 155 PS (153 hp; 114 kW), both with a 6-speed manual transmission. With the EcoBoost Hybrid, the standard alternator is replaced with a belt-driven integrated starter-generator (BISG), enabling energy recuperation during braking and coasting to charge a 48-volt lithium-ion battery pack located beneath the front passenger seat.

Ford has also introduced a configurable 12.3-inch digital instrument cluster. The new Connected variant comes as standard with a wireless charging pad, a SYNC 3 infotainment system with navigation, adaptive cruise control, front and rear parking sensors and a rearview camera.

Meanwhile, the ST-Line and Active feature dual-zone climate control, auto-dimming rear-view mirror, rain-sensing wipers and Ford's proprietary door-mounted keypad system, marketed as its Securicode. ST-Line X models come with a larger roof spoiler and the Active X gets a black headliner.

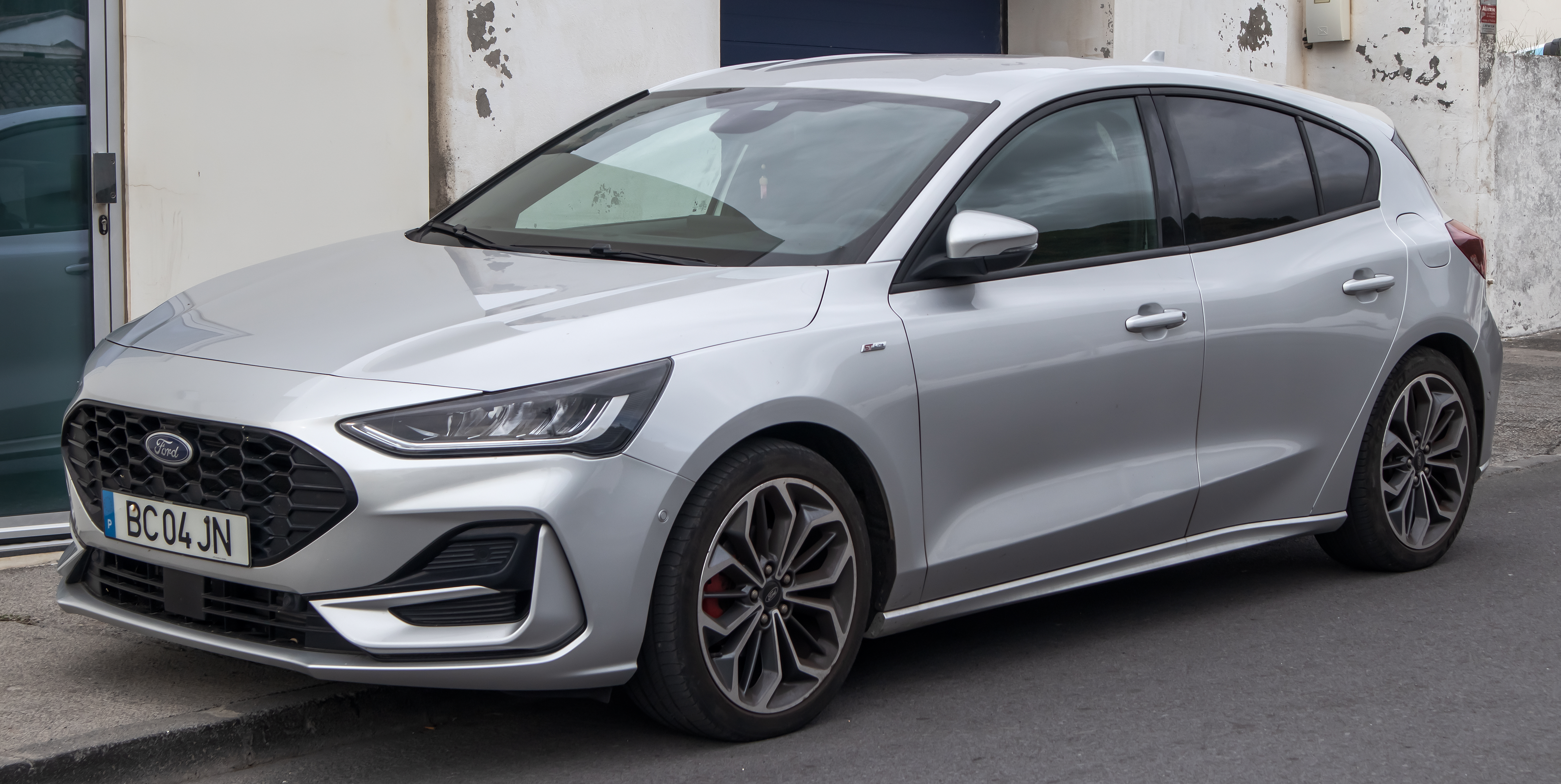
2022 Ford Focus hatchback (facelift)

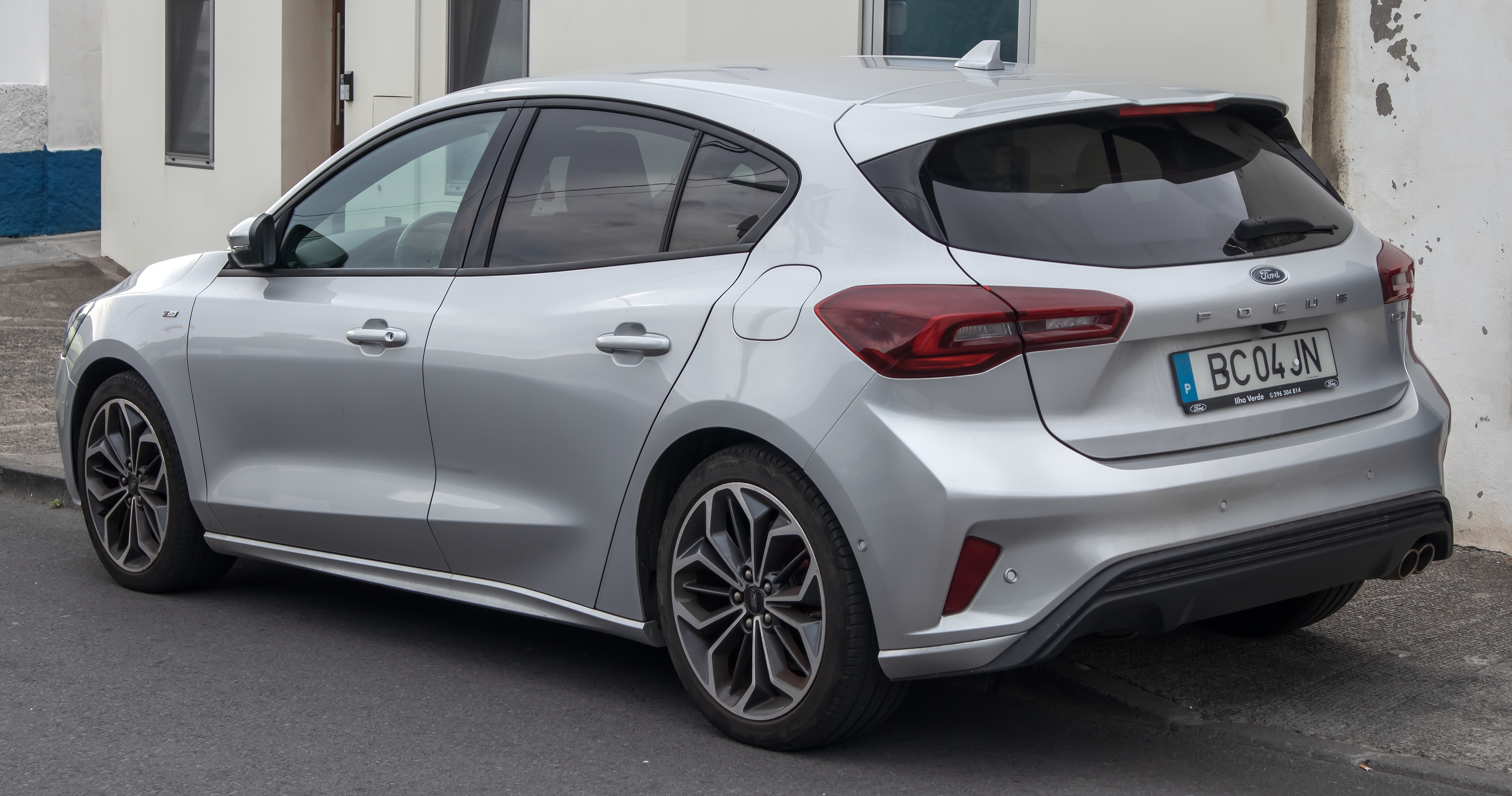
2022 Ford Focus hatchback (facelift)

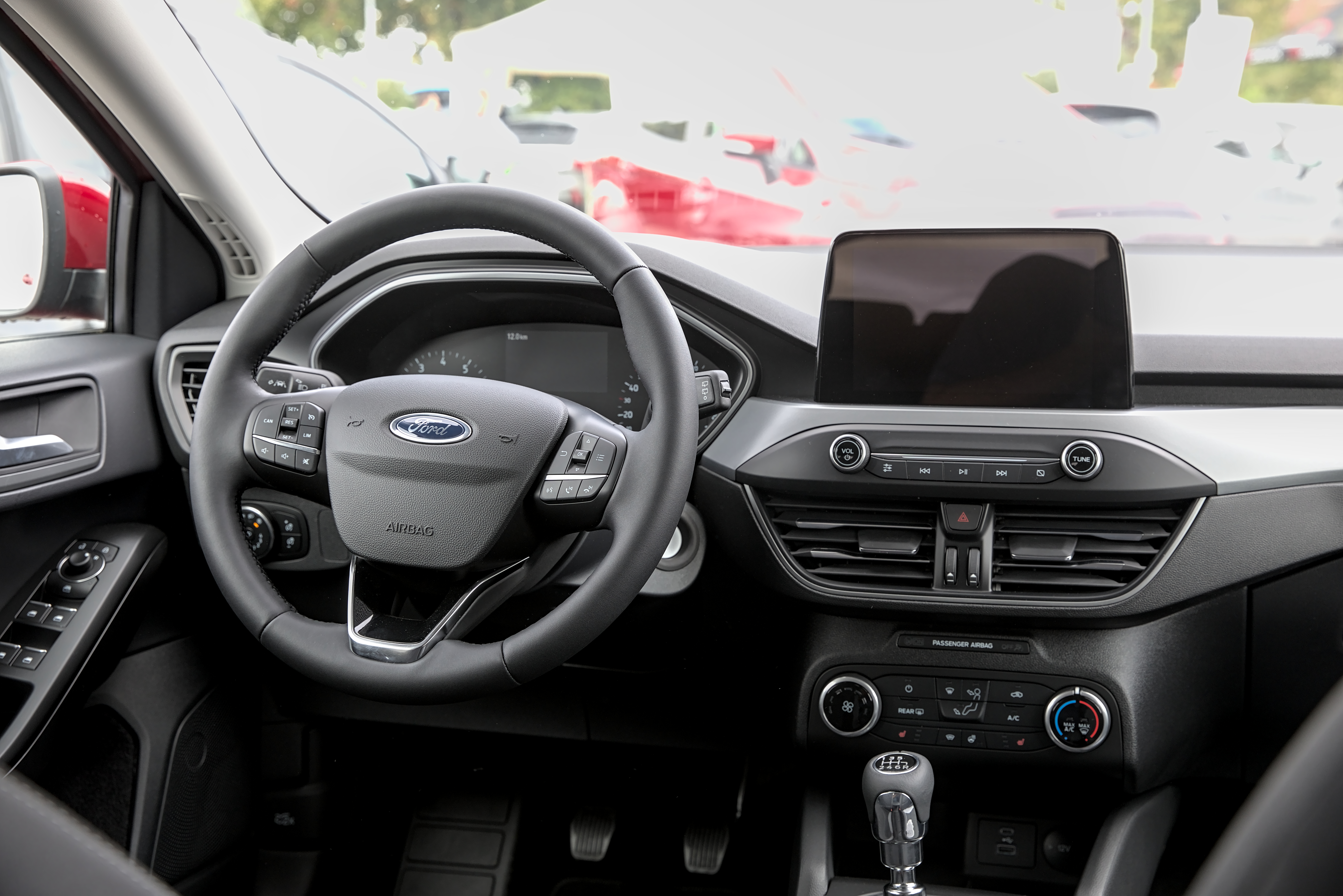
Interior (facelift)

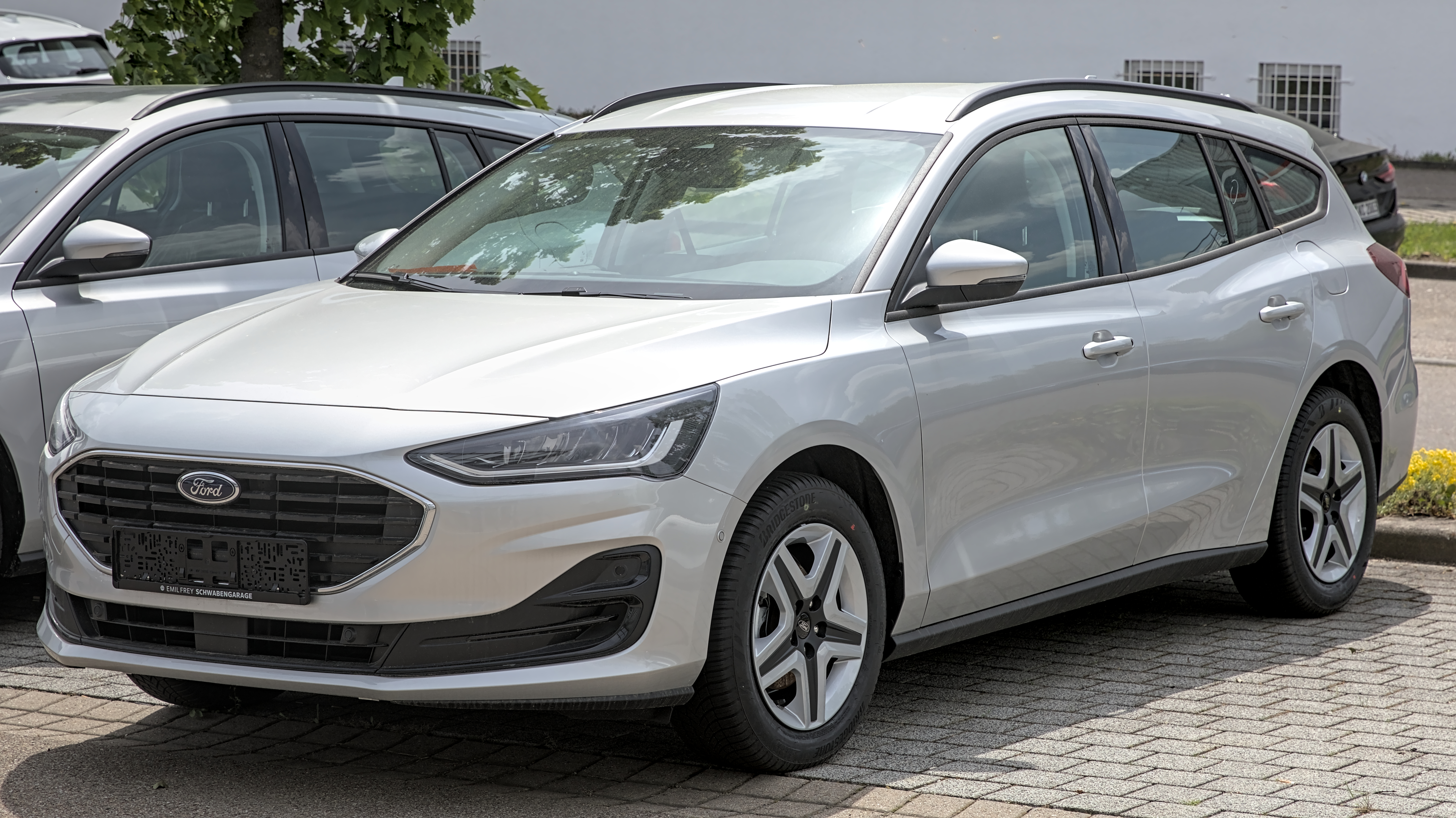
2022 Ford Focus estate (facelift)

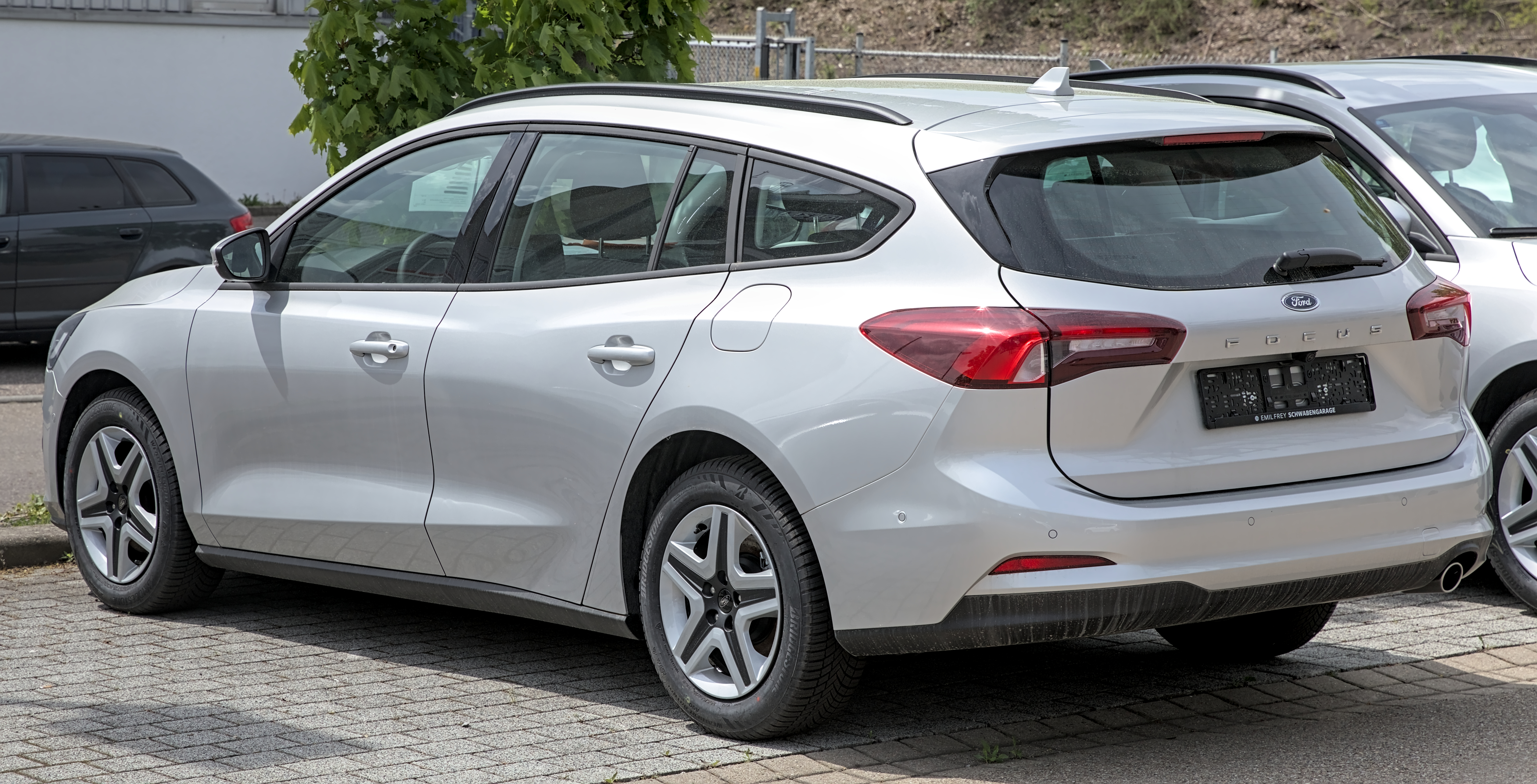
2022 Ford Focus estate (facelift)

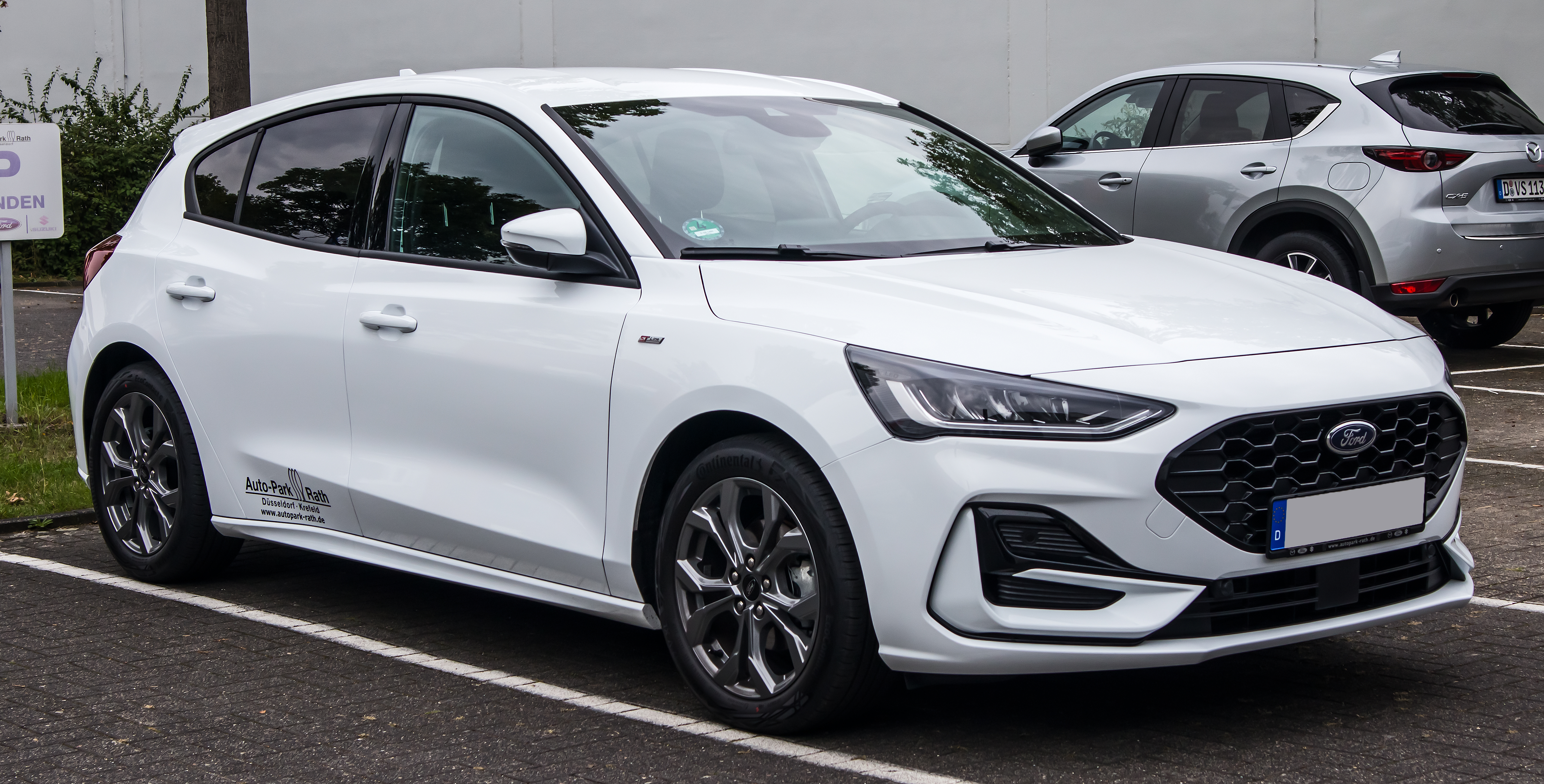
2022 Ford Focus ST-Line (facelift)

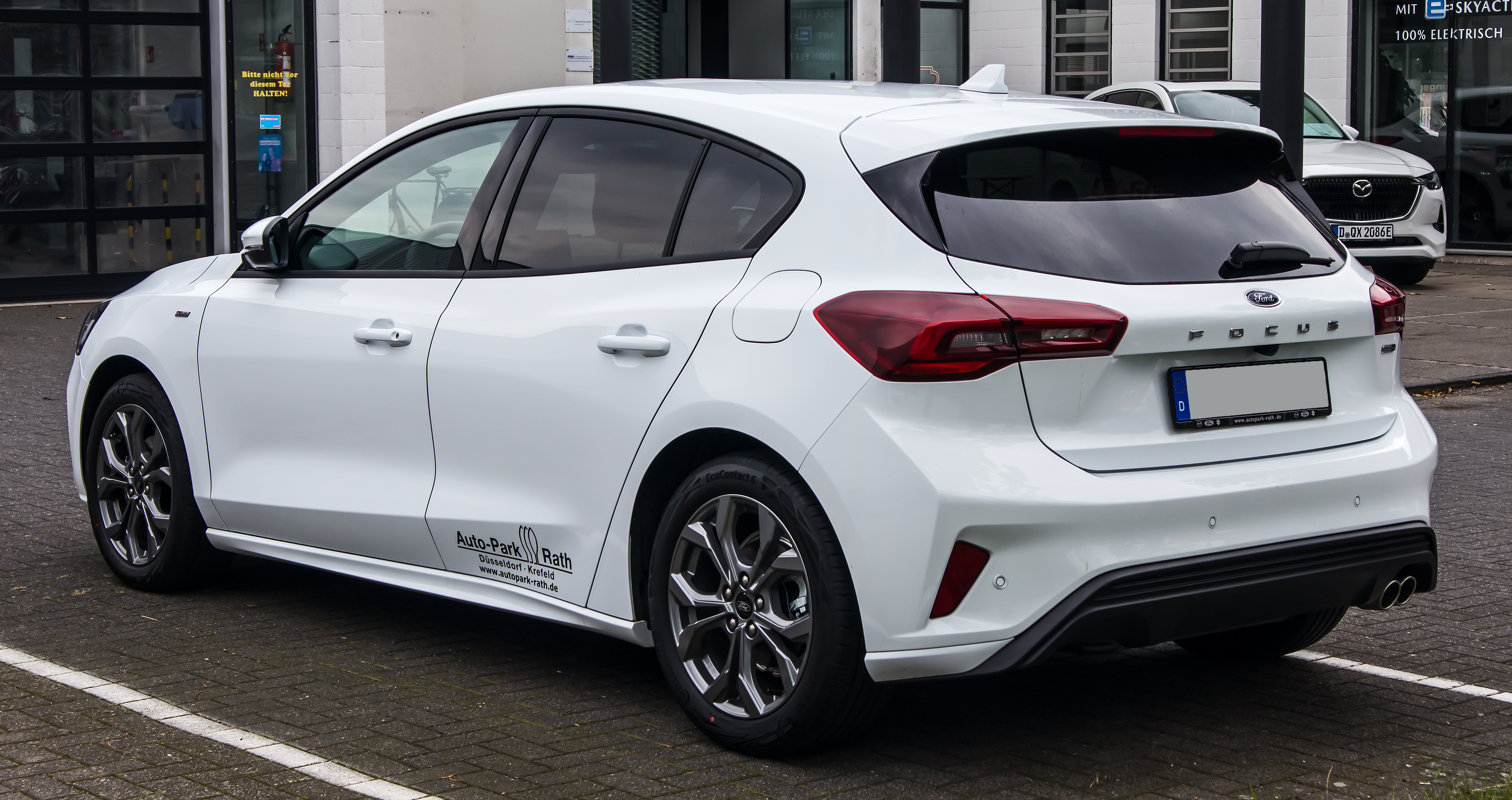
2022 Ford Focus ST-Line (facelift)

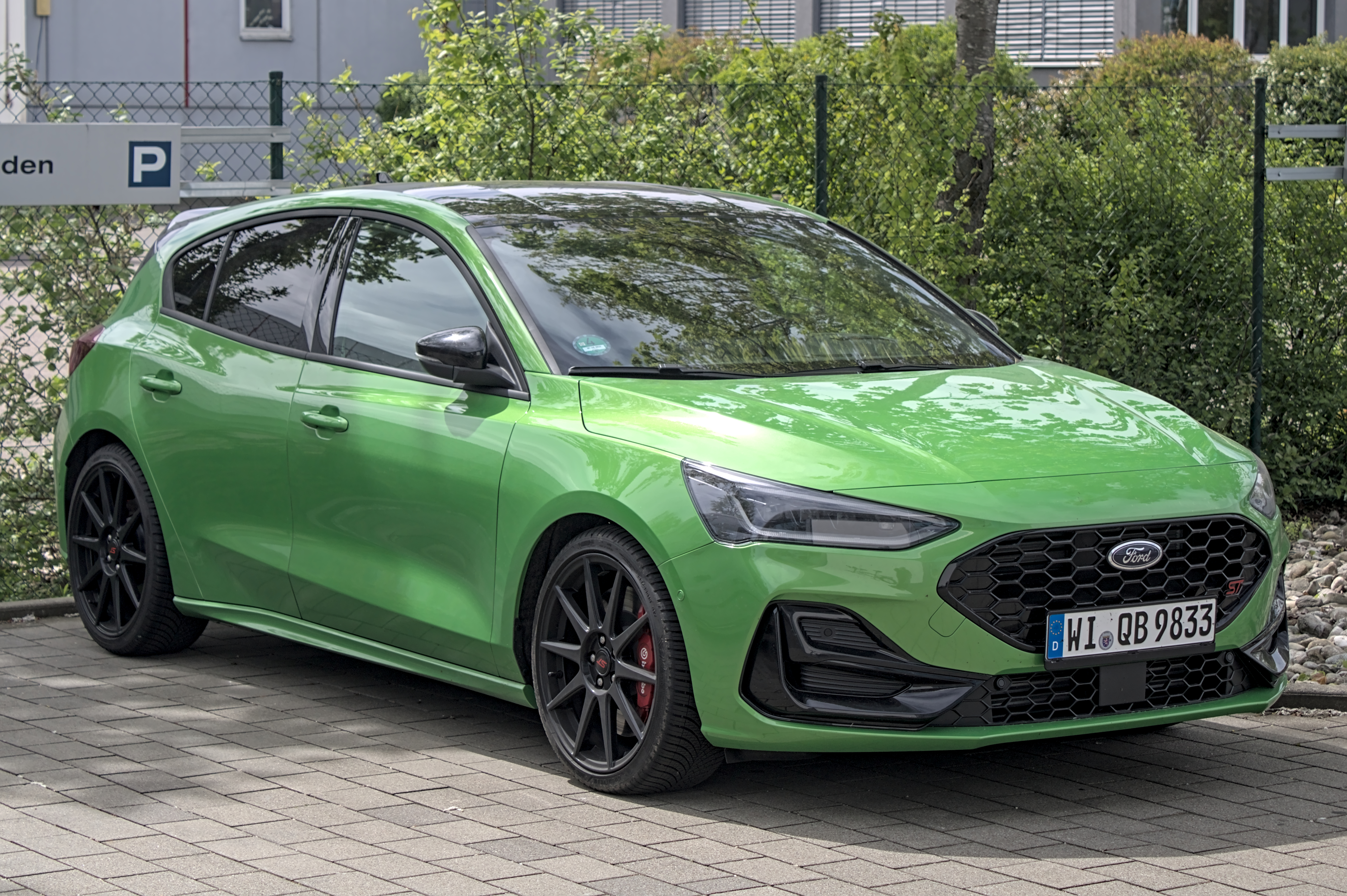
2022 Ford Focus ST (facelift)

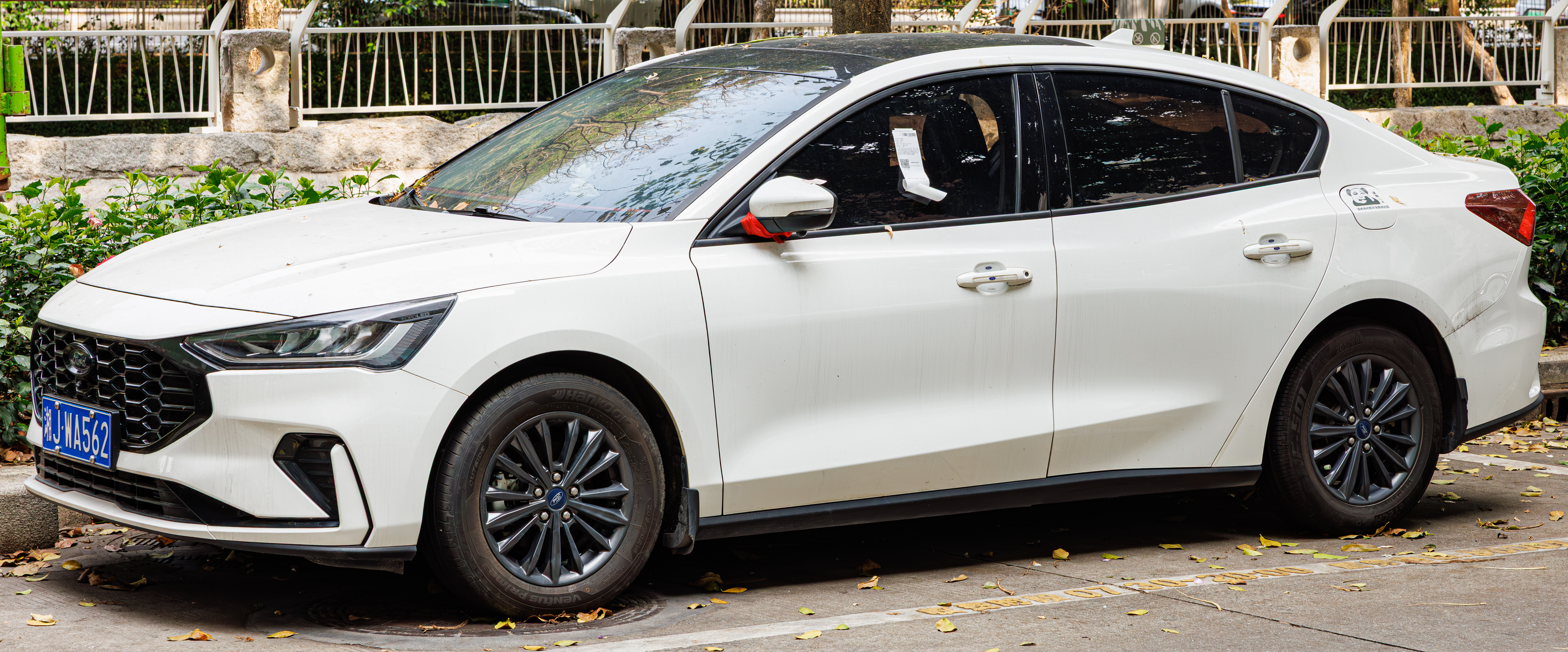
2022 Ford Focus Sedan (facelift, China)

== Marketing ==
In April 2018, Ford announced that all passenger vehicles but the Mustang would be discontinued in the North American market, in order to focus on trucks and SUVs. The Focus Active was intended to be the only version of the model available in the market, but Ford cancelled these plans in August 2018 over tariffs imposed by the U.S. government on exports from China, as the model is manufactured in the country.

Ford also cancelled plans to manufacture the fourth generation Focus in Thailand, due to the low sales for the previous generation Focus, and a strategy change saw Ford halting sales and production of the passenger cars in the country.

Ford limited sales of fourth generation Focus in its 4-door saloon form in Estonia, Latvia, Lithuania, Serbia, Montenegro, North Macedonia, Albania, Bulgaria, Romania, Moldova, Turkey, Cyprus as well as many Asian and African countries. Ford no longer sells the Focus in Russia, Belarus, Kazakhstan, and Israel due to a broader reorganization of their European branch.

In April 2020, Ford confirmed there are no plans for a fourth generation Focus RS model due to pan-European emissions standards and high development costs.

=== Australia ===
The 4th generation Focus was launched in November 2018 in Australia, as the car is fully imported from Germany instead of Thailand from previous generation. The model were available with Trend, and ST-Line models available from launch. Ambiente, Active and Titanium models were available in mid-2019. The Focus ST launched in 2020.

It was also the first time the wagon was available in Australia and solely in ST-Line guise. The wagon was initially the only variant to offer fully independent rear suspension (IRS), whereas other variants were fitted with a torsion-beam rear suspension.

Engines available are the 1.5-litre EcoBoost three-cylinder with 134 kW (182 PS; 180 hp) and 240 N⋅m (177 lb⋅ft), and a 2.3-litre EcoBoost four-cylinder with 206 kW (280 PS; 276 hp) and 420 N⋅m (310 lb⋅ft). Transmissions include the 8F24 8-speed automatic standard on 1.5 L EcoBoost, 6-speed manual standard on ST, with a 7-speed automatic a no-cost option. A 6-speed automatic was previously offered on Ambiente models.

The Focus has received a full 5-star ANCAP safety rating in 2019 (aligned with Euro NCAP).

In June 2020, the Focus lineup in Australia had been culled to only the ST-Line Hatch (wagon discontinued), Active and ST. To compensate for the discontinuation of the Titanium, features such as front parking sensors and LED headlights were made standard on the ST-Line. Independent rear suspension was also added to the ST-Line where it was previously only fitted on the ST-Line wagon and Active. FordPass 4G modems were also added to the Focus in Australia for the first time allowing remote unlocking and start from a smartphone.

Coinciding with the launch of the facelift model in 2022, only the ST model will be sold, with non-Ford Performance models (ST-Line Hatch and Active) being discontinued in Australia. The ST and ST X will replace the ST-1 and ST-2 variants launched in 2020. The ST now receives less standard equipment than previously, such as 18 alloys rather than the 19" alloys previously standard across the range. While the ST X gains LED matrix headlights and 19" alloys.

Ford Australia discontinued the Focus ST and Fiesta ST, from its lineup on August 5, 2022. Forty examples of the facelifted Focus ST were secured for the Australian market, with both vehicles to be retired before the end of 2022. The company said the decision was led by the semiconductor chip shortage and a priority for its higher selling vehicles, such as the Ranger, Everest, Mustang, Escape and Puma.

== Powertrain ==
Model	Type	Power	Torque	Years
Petrol engines
1.0 L EcoBoost 85 PS	998 cc turbocharged I3	85 PS (63 kW; 84 bhp)	170 N⋅m (125 lbf⋅ft)	2018–2025
1.0 L EcoBoost 100 PS	998 cc turbocharged I3	100 PS (74 kW; 99 bhp)	170 N⋅m (125 lbf⋅ft)	2018–2025
1.0 L EcoBoost 125 PS	998 cc turbocharged I3	125 PS (92 kW; 123 bhp)	170 N⋅m (125 lbf⋅ft)	2018–2025
1.5 L EcoBoost 150 PS	1,497 cc turbocharged I3	150 PS (110 kW; 148 bhp)	240 N⋅m (177 lbf⋅ft)	2018–2025
1.5 L EcoBoost 182 PS	1,497 cc turbocharged I3	182 PS (134 kW; 180 bhp)	240 N⋅m (177 lbf⋅ft)	2018–2025
2.3 L EcoBoost 280 PS	2,261 cc turbocharged I4	280 PS (206 kW; 276 bhp)	420 N⋅m (310 lbf⋅ft)	2019–2025
Petrol mild hybrid engines
1.0 L EcoBoost Hybrid 125 PS	998 cc turbocharged I3	125 PS (92 kW; 123 bhp)	210 N⋅m (155 lbf⋅ft)	2020–2025
1.0 L EcoBoost Hybrid 155 PS	998 cc turbocharged I3	155 PS (114 kW; 153 bhp)	240 N⋅m (177 lbf⋅ft)	2020–2025
Diesel engines
1.5 L EcoBlue 95 PS	1,498 cc turbocharged I4	95 PS (70 kW; 94 bhp)	300 N⋅m (221 lbf⋅ft)	2018–2025
1.5 L EcoBlue 120 PS	1,498 cc turbocharged I4	120 PS (88 kW; 118 bhp)	300 N⋅m (221 lbf⋅ft)	2018–2025
2.0 L EcoBlue 150 PS	1,995 cc turbocharged I4	150 PS (110 kW; 148 bhp)	370 N⋅m (273 lbf⋅ft)	2018–2025
2.0 L EcoBlue 190 PS	1,995 cc turbocharged I4	190 PS (140 kW; 187 bhp)	400 N⋅m (295 lbf⋅ft)	2019–2025

== Safety ==
The fourth-generation Focus features the Ford Co-Pilot360 technology which is claimed to enhance safety, driving and parking. It includes adaptive cruise control with Stop & Go, speed sign recognition and lane-centring which works at speeds of up to 200 km/h (124 mph).

Another safety features include Adaptive Front Lighting System with Predictive curve light and Sign-based light, Active Park Assist 2, Park-out Assist, Pre-Collision Assist with Pedestrian and Cyclist Detection, Evasive Steering Assist, Blind Spot Information System with Cross Traffic Alert, Rear wide-view camera, Wrong Way Alert, Ford MyKey and Post-Collision Braking.

Euro NCAP test results* Ford Focus (2019)
Test	Points	%
Overall:	5 /5 stars	
Adult occupant:	36.6	96%
Child occupant:	43	87%
Pedestrian:	34.8	72%
Safety assist:	9.9	75%

ANCAP test results* Ford Focus all variants (2018, aligned with Euro NCAP)
Test	Points	%
Overall:	5 /5 stars	
Adult occupant:	32.5	85%
Child occupant:	43	87%
Pedestrian:	34.8	72%
Safety assist:	9.3	72%

ANCAP test results* Ford Focus all variants (2019, aligned with Euro NCAP)
Test	Points	%
Overall:	5 /5 stars	
Adult occupant:	36.6	96%
Child occupant:	43	87%
Pedestrian:	34.8	72%
Safety assist:	9.3	72%

TNCAP (1.0) test result Ford Focus 'X' hatchback (2023, similar to Euro NCAP 2017)
Test	Points	%
Overall:	5/5 stars	
Adult occupant:	35.903	94%
Child occupant:	43.924	89%
Pedestrian:	34.618	82%
Safety assist:	11.174	93%
