= Ford PowerShift transmission =

Dual clutch automatic transmission

The Ford PowerShift are 6 and 7-speed dual-clutch automatic transmissions, produced for the Ford Motor Company. The 6 speed PowerShift gearboxes were built by Getrag Ford Transmissions, a joint-venture with Getrag. PowerShift improves fuel efficiency by as much as 10 percent when compared to a conventional automatic transmission.

The operation of a dual-clutch transmission is analogous to two traditional manual transmissions, each with its own clutch, operating in parallel and alternating shifts. The Ford unit is a six-speed with one clutch acting on reverse, first, third, and fifth gears, and the other used for second, fourth, sixth gears. As the first gear is engaged, the 2-4-6 clutch is disengaged and the second gear cogs are engaged. At the appropriate time, the R-1-3-5 clutch is disengaged and the 2-4-6 clutch is engaged. While in second gear, the other side shifts from first to third. The process is repeated with none of the efficiency loss normally associated with torque converters and, in theory, provides quick smooth shifts.

The older PowerShift gearboxes were developed jointly by Ford, Getrag, and LuK and were first introduced in Europe.

Lower torque versions of the PowerShift transmission, including the 6DCT250 DPS6 version used in the Ford Fiesta and Ford Focus, used dry clutches and electric motor/solenoid actuation.

Newer PowerShift transmissions are still manufactured by Getrag and can be found on Ford Fiesta and Puma models starting with MY2020, these are known as 7DCT300 (wet clutch).

== Applications ==
Ford

- Ford Focus - International (2008–2019; Mk2 facelift, Mk3) (2012-2018 in US markets)
- Ford C-MAX (2008– )
- Ford Mondeo (2008– )
- Ford Fiesta (2010–2017; Mk7) (2020-2023; Mk8 MY2020/2021)
- Ford Puma (2020-present)
- Ford S-MAX (2010–2019)
- Ford Galaxy (2010–2018)
- Ford Kuga (2010–2018)
- Ford Ecosport (2012–2017), Brazil (2013-2017). 2018+ use a traditional 6-speed torque converter automatic.
- Ford B-Max (2012– )
- Ford Tourneo Connect / Ford Transit Connect (US) (2012– )
- Ford Edge (2016– ), European models with diesel engine

Newer vehicles like Fiesta and Puma use the newer 7-speed PowerShift, while others have reverted to a torque-converter automatic.

Volvo Cars

While P3 Volvo models using the EcoBoost engine in 1.6T derivatives are equipped with the 6-speed PowerShift, some older P3 platform cars feature the 6-speed PowerShift in 2.0T derivatives (Badged T3 (1.6T), T4 (1.6T), and 2.0T).

- Volvo S60 (2011-2015)
- Volvo V60 (2011-2015)
- Volvo S80 (2009-2015)
- Volvo V70 (2.0T) (2008-2015)
- Volvo XC70 (2.0T) (2008-2015)
- Volvo C30 (2.0T) (2008-2013)
- Volvo V40 (2012-2015)

By model year 2015, all Volvo cars had stopped using EcoBoost engines and the only automatic transmission options were from Aisin.

== Faulty operation ==
The use of cheaper, lighter and simpler dry clutch packs in lower-end models of the transmission ultimately led to the demise of the PowerShift name.

The gearboxes with dry clutch packs were used in the Fiesta, Focus and EcoSport. Dry clutches are designed to be used in manual transmissions, and are known to have very peculiar engagement properties, unlike wet (oil-bathed) clutches which are much smoother in operation, and have a higher tolerance for slipping the clutches as they have better heat dissipation. This all makes wet clutches better suited for use in DCTs, and thus Ford experienced problems with models of the transmission which used dry clutch packs.

Ford has faced class-action lawsuits and fraud investigations in the United States, Australia and Canada over the PowerShift gearbox as being defective and potentially dangerous in the Ford Focus, Ford Fiesta and Ford EcoSport. The lawsuits allege that vehicles equipped with the PowerShift gearbox "continue to experience the transmission defect, including, but not limited to, bucking, kicking, jerking, harsh engagement, and delayed acceleration and lurching." U.S. courts tentatively approved a settlement of the U.S. lawsuit on April 25, 2017.

Ford has claimed that the defects were caused by either a faulty throwout bearing or input shaft and rear main seals that leak fluid onto the clutch causing it to slip even while supposedly fully engaged. Ford has released fixes of the seals and updated clutch kits. There were also issues with the transmission control module such as faulty connector pins, shifter motors failing, and a poorly connected main ground wire due to paint on threads or an incorrect bolt being used during assembly. These transmissions were still installed into Focus and Fiesta until Ford introduced newer models to replace them.

However, subsequent journalistic investigations conducted after the Focus and Fiesta models were succeeded, has revealed that Ford engineers and executives were aware of the problems before and after the release of it, with developmental engineers even stating in company e-mails that there was "no driveable calibration" of the transmission, and with pre-production test engineers having to pull over out of traffic due to the transmission shifting into neutral. These were mainly caused by the clutch pack overheating, and the control module instructing clutches to disengage in order to prevent further damage; though faulty control modules may also exhibit such behaviour. Yet Ford has repeatedly denied systemic problems even to their own dealerships, instead directing them to replace the transmission over and over even though it was never truly fixed.

Ford Thailand agreed to buy back about 200 Ford Fiesta and Focus models with faulty PowerShift transmissions. Ford Brazil extended the warranty of the transmission to 10 years or 240.000 km. Ford USA extended the warranty of the transmission to 7 years or 100,000 miles depending on the model year of the vehicle. Ford Australia has had a $AU10,000,000 fine imposed on it by the Australian Federal Court for unconscionable conduct relating to the transmission problems and poor handling of customer complaints In 2019, US Department of Justice fraud investigators began a probe to determine if the company was aware of a defect that it knew to be irreparable, or if it may have misled customers and safety regulators.

== See also ==
- List of Ford transmissions
- Ford EcoBoost engine
