= Volvo V40 =

Volvo V40 may refer to:

- Volvo V40 (1995–2004), a station wagon version of the S40 manufactured by Volvo from 1995 to 2004
- Volvo V40 (2012–2019), a hatchback manufactured by Volvo from 2012 to 2019
