= Lincoln Corsair =

Compact luxury crossover utility vehicle

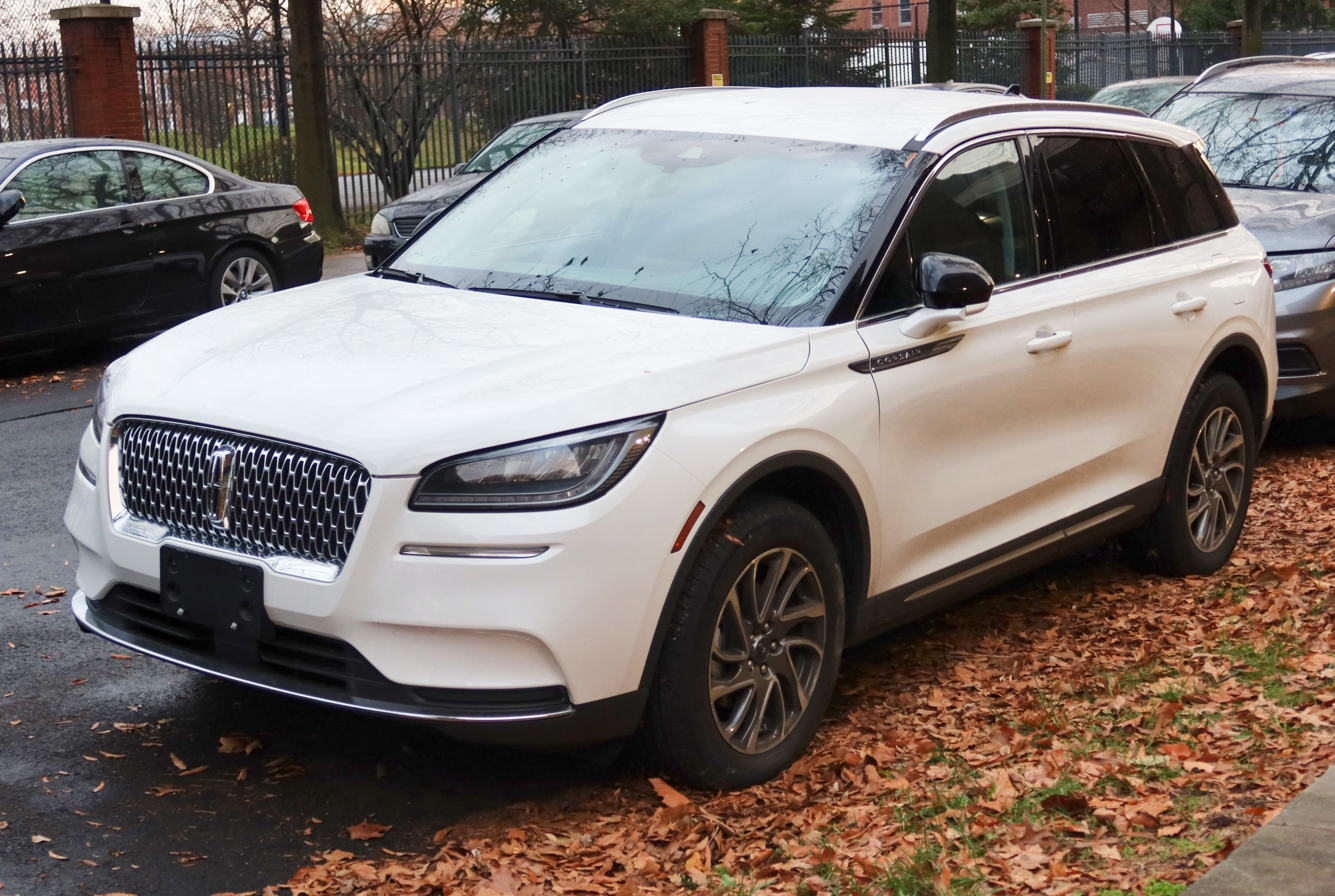
- 2020 Lincoln Corsair

Overview
- Manufacturer: Lincoln (Ford)
- Production: August 2019–December 2025 (US); 2020–present (China)
- Model years: 2020–present
- Assembly: United States: Louisville, Kentucky (Louisville Assembly Plant); China: Chongqing (Changan Ford)
- Designer: Kemal Curić, Shawn Wehrly

Body and chassis
- Class: Compact luxury crossover SUV (C)
- Body style: 5-door SUV
- Layout: Front-engine, front-wheel-drive; Front-engine, all-wheel-drive
- Platform: Ford C2
- Related: Ford Escape/Kuga; Ford Bronco Sport

Powertrain
- Engine: Gasoline: 2.0 L EcoBoost turbo I4; 2.3 L EcoBoost turbo I4; Gasoline plug-in hybrid: 2.5 L Duratec iVCT Atkinson cycle I4
- Electric motor: 2×permanent magnet synchronous (1×PowerSplit eCVT + 1×rear)
- Transmission: 8-speed SelectShift 8F35/8F40 automatic; eCVT (Grand Touring)
- Battery: 14.4 kWh NMC Samsung SDI (Grand Touring)
- Electric range: 27–28 mi (43–45 km) (Grand Touring, EPA)
- Plug-in charging: AC: 3.3 kW SAEJ1772 (Grand Touring)

Dimensions
- Wheelbase: 2,710 mm (106.7 in)
- Length: 4,608 mm (181.4 in)
- Width: 1,887 mm (74.3 in)
- Height: 1,630 mm (64.2 in)

Chronology
- Predecessor: Lincoln MKC

The Lincoln Corsair is a compact luxury crossover manufactured by Ford and marketed by its Lincoln brand since 2019, superseding the MKC. The Corsair was Lincoln's best-selling model through 2023.

== Overview ==
The Corsair made its debut on April 17, 2019, at the New York Auto Show and shares its underpinnings with the fourth generation Ford Escape. The Corsair joined the Nautilus (previously the MKX), Aviator, Continental, and Navigator in the Lincoln model line. The name "Corsair" has previously been used on several other Ford products including the Edsel Corsair and the British Ford Corsair.

The Corsair went on sale in late 2019 with Standard and Reserve trims, with the exclusively plug-in hybrid Grand Touring trim arriving later in 2020. In the Chinese market, deliveries of the Corsair (Chinese: 冒险家; pinyin: mào xiǎn jiā; lit. 'buccaneer') began in May 2020.

The interior features a standard 8-inch display flanked by a speedometer and tachometer in the instrument cluster and 8-inch infotainment screen running Lincoln Sync 3 software. Integrated air vents span the width of the dashboard with buttons for operation of the computer-controlled transmission mounted below the vents, below which HVAC and media controls are located. Standard equipment featured a driver assistance suite marketed as Co-Pilot360 which included blind spot monitoring, automatic emergency braking and lane-keep assist.

Optional upgrades include a 12.3-inch fully digital gauge cluster with integrated navigation, 24-way power seats marketed as Perfect Position, a 14-speaker Revel sound system, and a heads-up display. the optional "Co-Pilot360 Plus" package included adaptive cruise control, automatic parking, and a 360-degree view camera.

Production of the Corsair, along with the Ford Escape ended in December 2025 at the Louisville Assembly Plant to make way for a midsize all-electric pickup to enter production in 2027. The new all-electric pickup truck will be called the Ford Fathom.

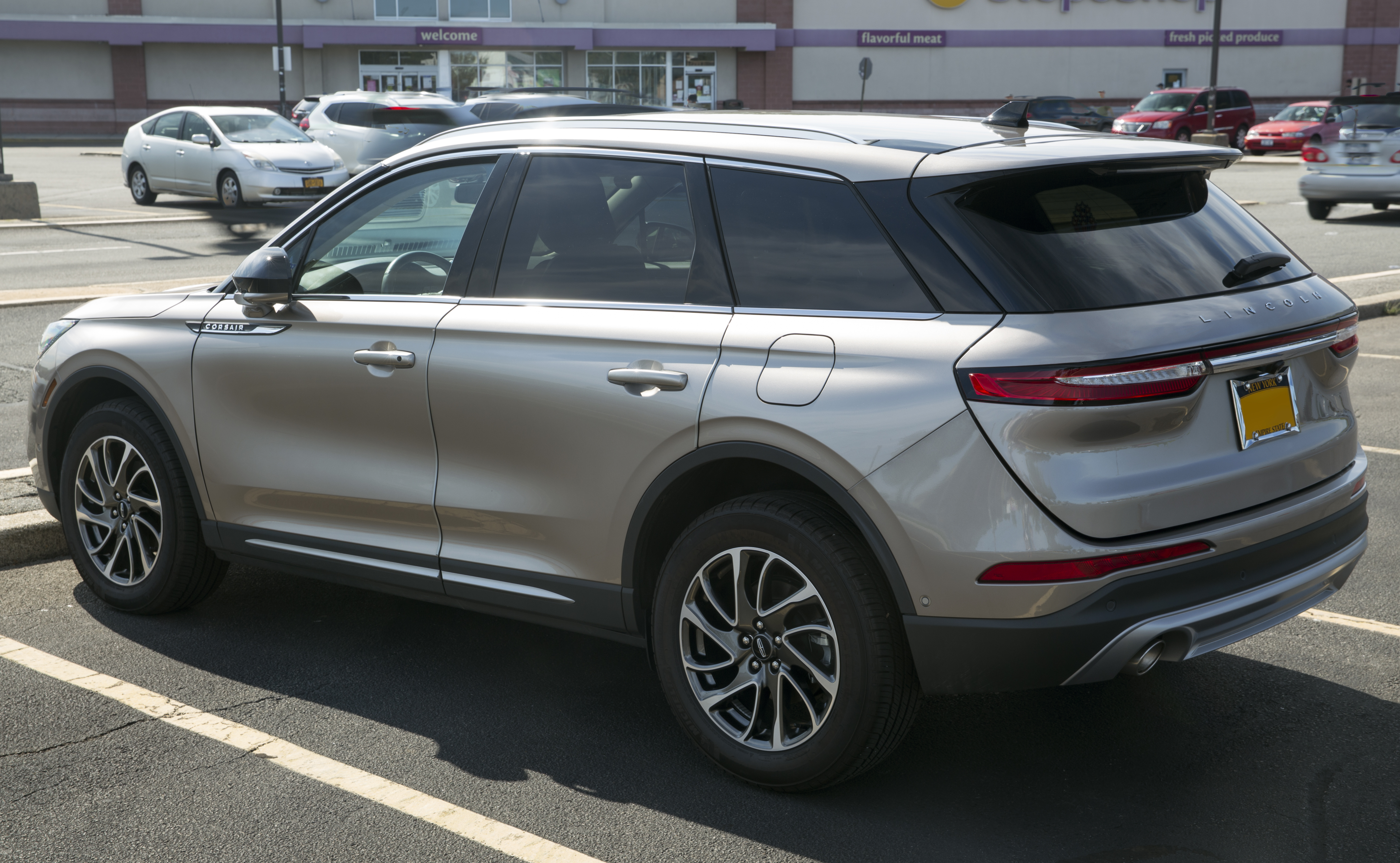
2020 Lincoln Corsair (rear)

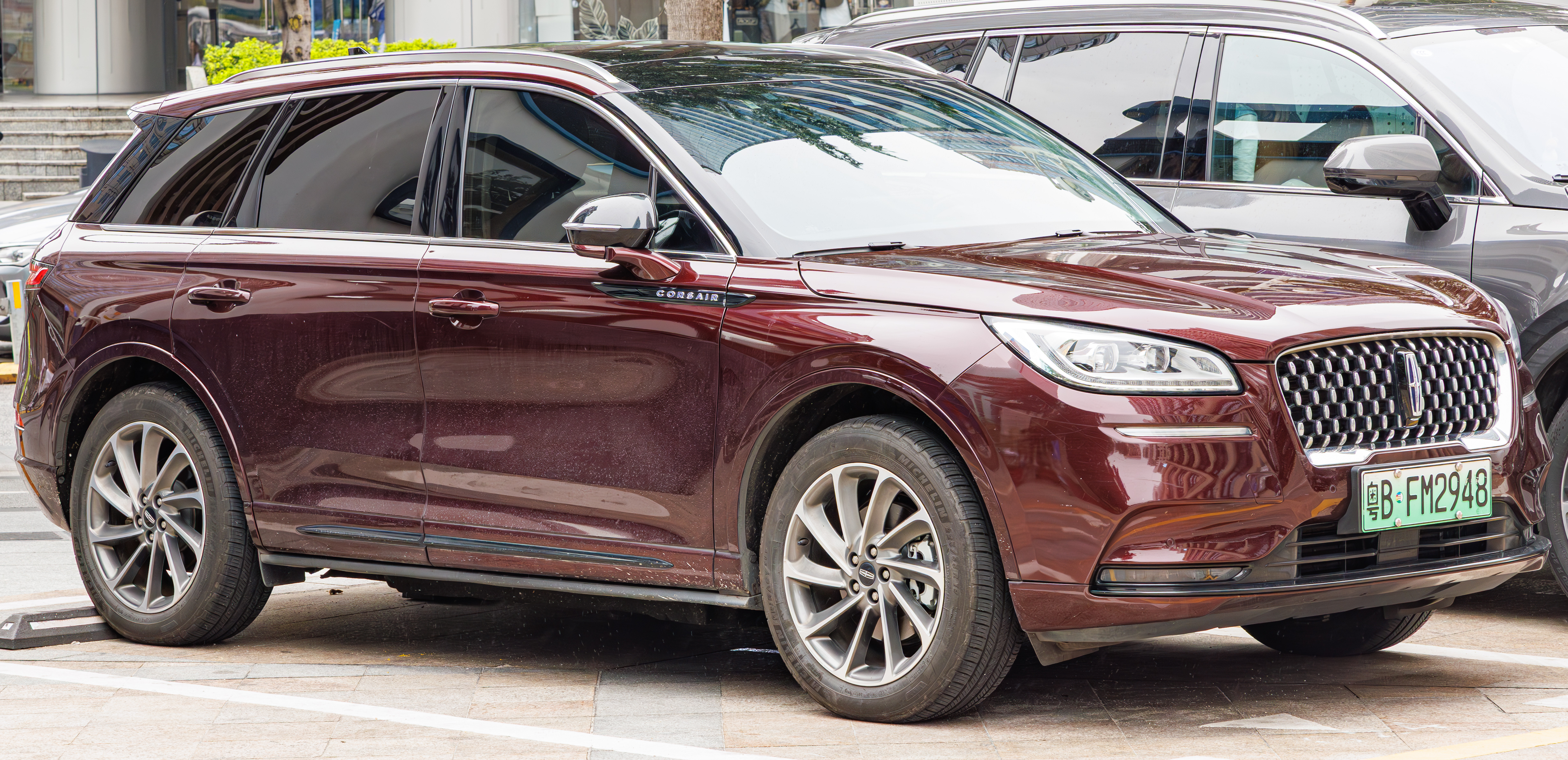
Lincoln Corsair PHEV front (China)

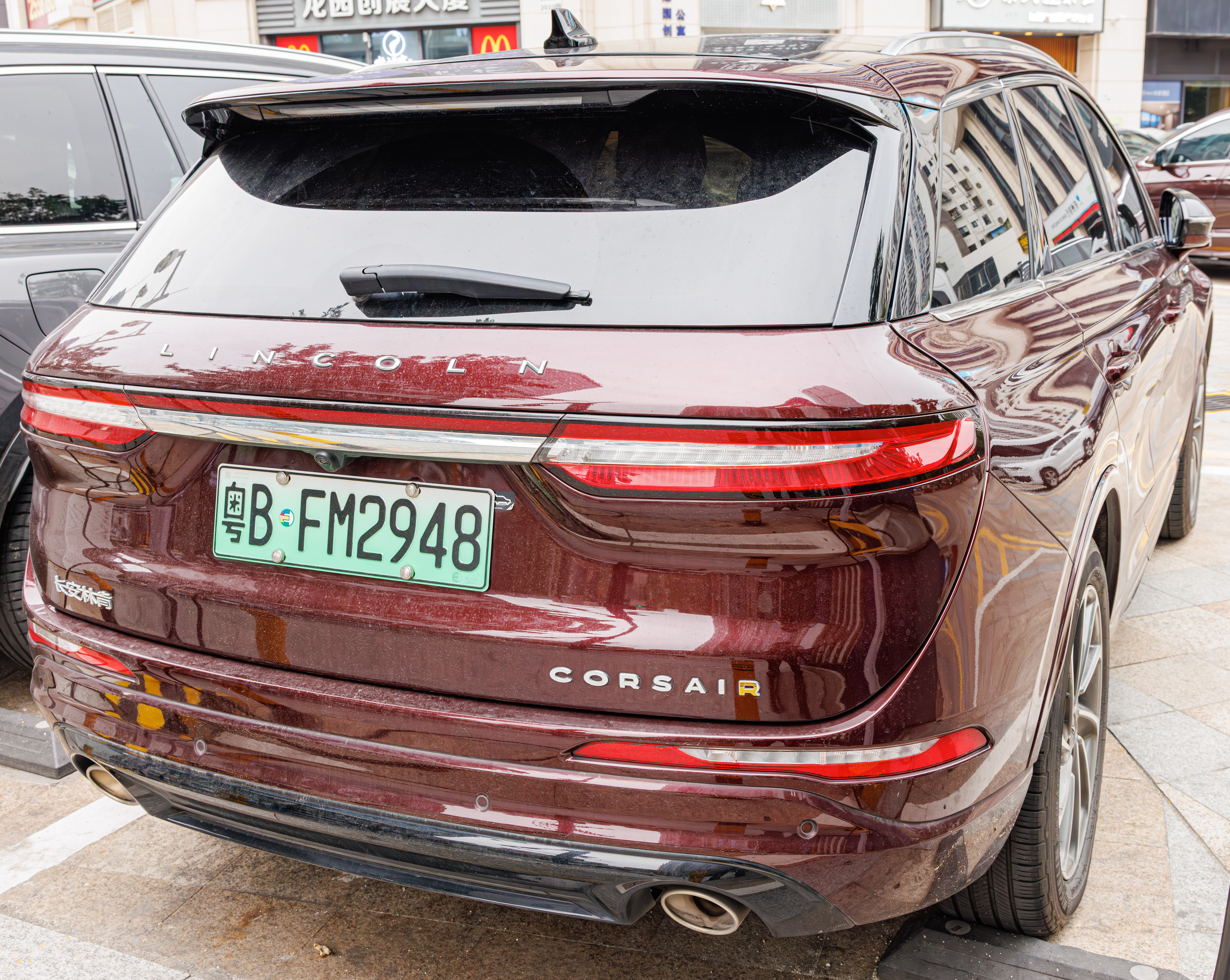
Lincoln Corsair PHEV rear (China)

=== Powertrain ===
The Corsair comes with three engine options. The base engine is a 2.0 L turbocharged 4-cylinder making 250 hp (186 kW) and 275 lb⋅ft (373 N⋅m) of torque and is paired with an 8-speed automatic transmission with either front or all-wheel drive. The upgrade engine option is a 2.3 L turbocharged 4-cylinder making 295 hp (220 kW) and 310 lb⋅ft (420 N⋅m) of torque, paired with the same transmission and is only available with all-wheel drive.

The final powertrain is a gasoline-electric plug-in hybrid consisting of a 2.5 L 4-cylinder in Atkinson cycle making 163 hp (122 kW) and 155 lb⋅ft (210 N⋅m) of torque, a 96 kW (129 hp) front motor, and a 50 kW (68 PS) rear motor. The gasoline engine and front motor power the front wheels through a planetary gearset eCVT transmission, while the rear motor independently drives the rear wheels thus providing all-wheel drive (eAWD). Total system is 266 hp (198 kW) and the 14.4 kWh Li-ion battery provides 28 mi (45 km) of all-electric range on the EPA test cycle.

=== 2023 facelift ===
On September 12 2022, a refreshed design of the Corsair was revealed for the North American market for the 2023 model year. Changes include updated exterior styling with a new larger grille and LED daytime running lights, new exterior colors. The interior receives a larger 13.2-inch touchscreen with Sync 4 software where the HVAC controls now reside, the 12.3-inch fully digital instrument cluster is now standard, and new upholstery choices are available. It is available with Lincoln's ActiveGlide hands-free advanced highway driving assistance system. The 2.3 L engine option was dropped, while the standard 2.0 L engine and plug-in hybrid remain. The base Standard trim has been renamed to Premiere, while the Reserve and exclusively plug-in hybrid Grand Touring trims remain. The Chinese-market facelift features unique front and rear fascias, as well as a redesigned interior consisting of a new steering wheel and a 27-inch panoramic display spanning the width of the dashboard..

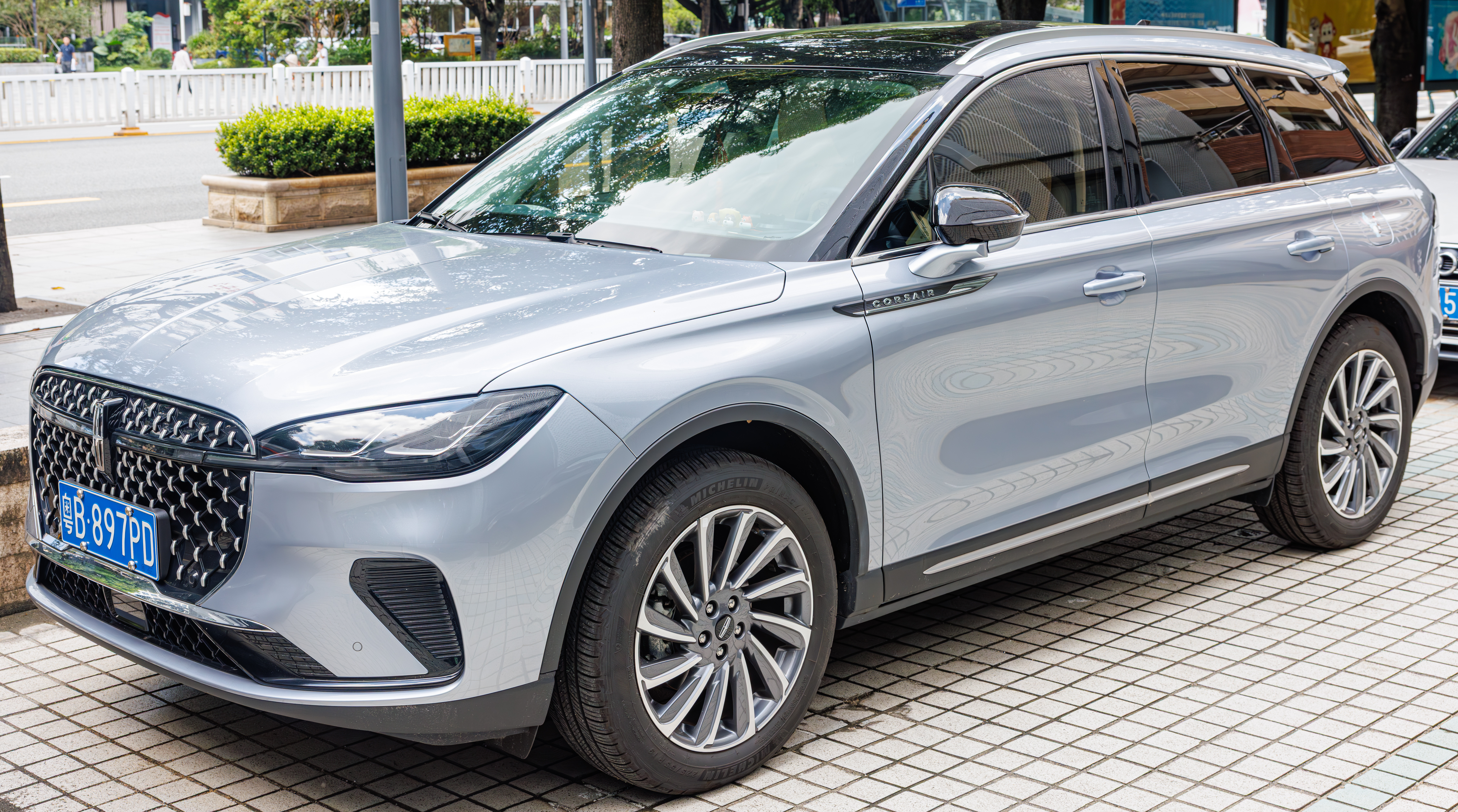
Lincoln Corsair 2023 facelift front (China)

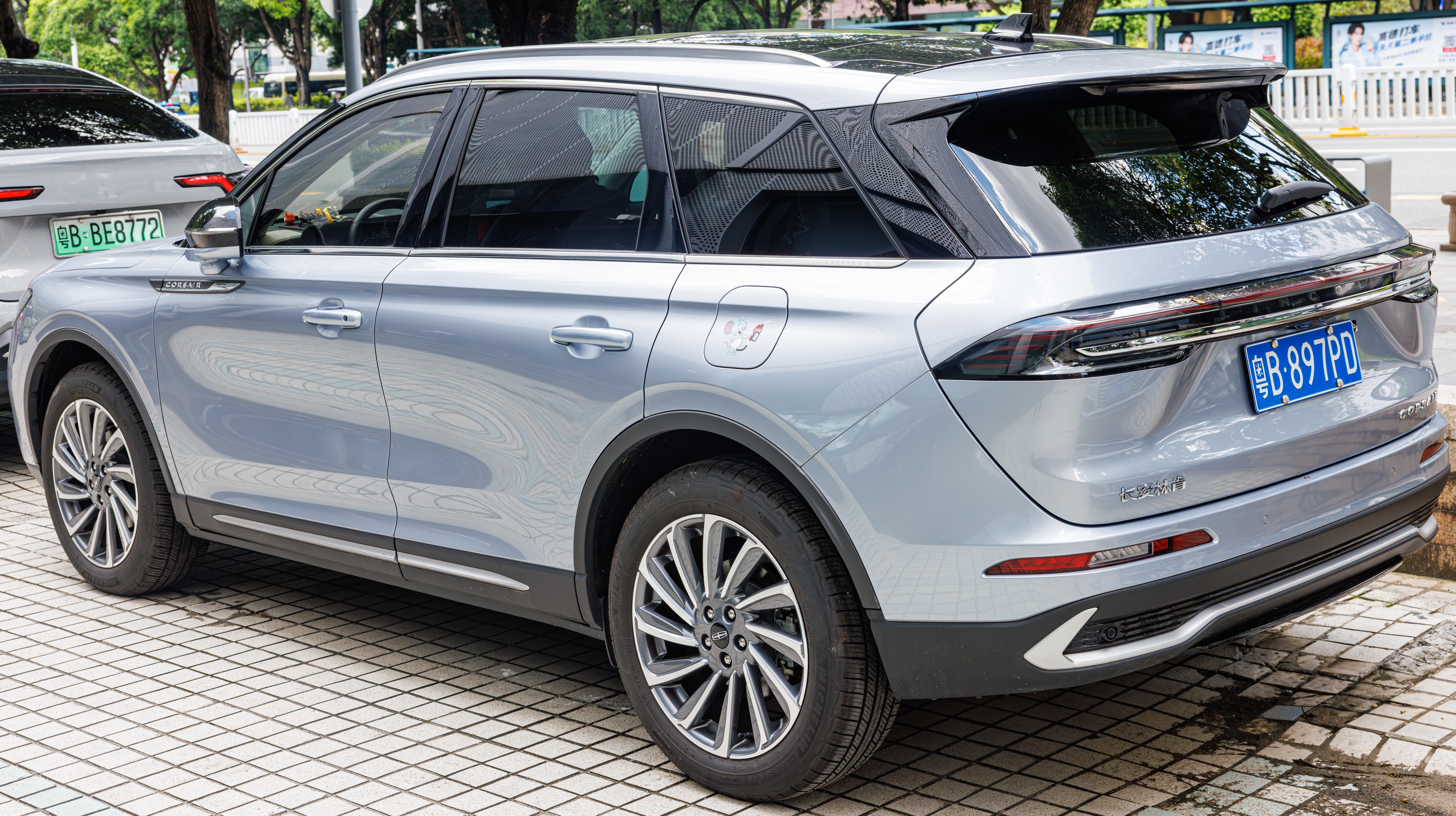
Lincoln Corsair 2023 facelift rear (China)

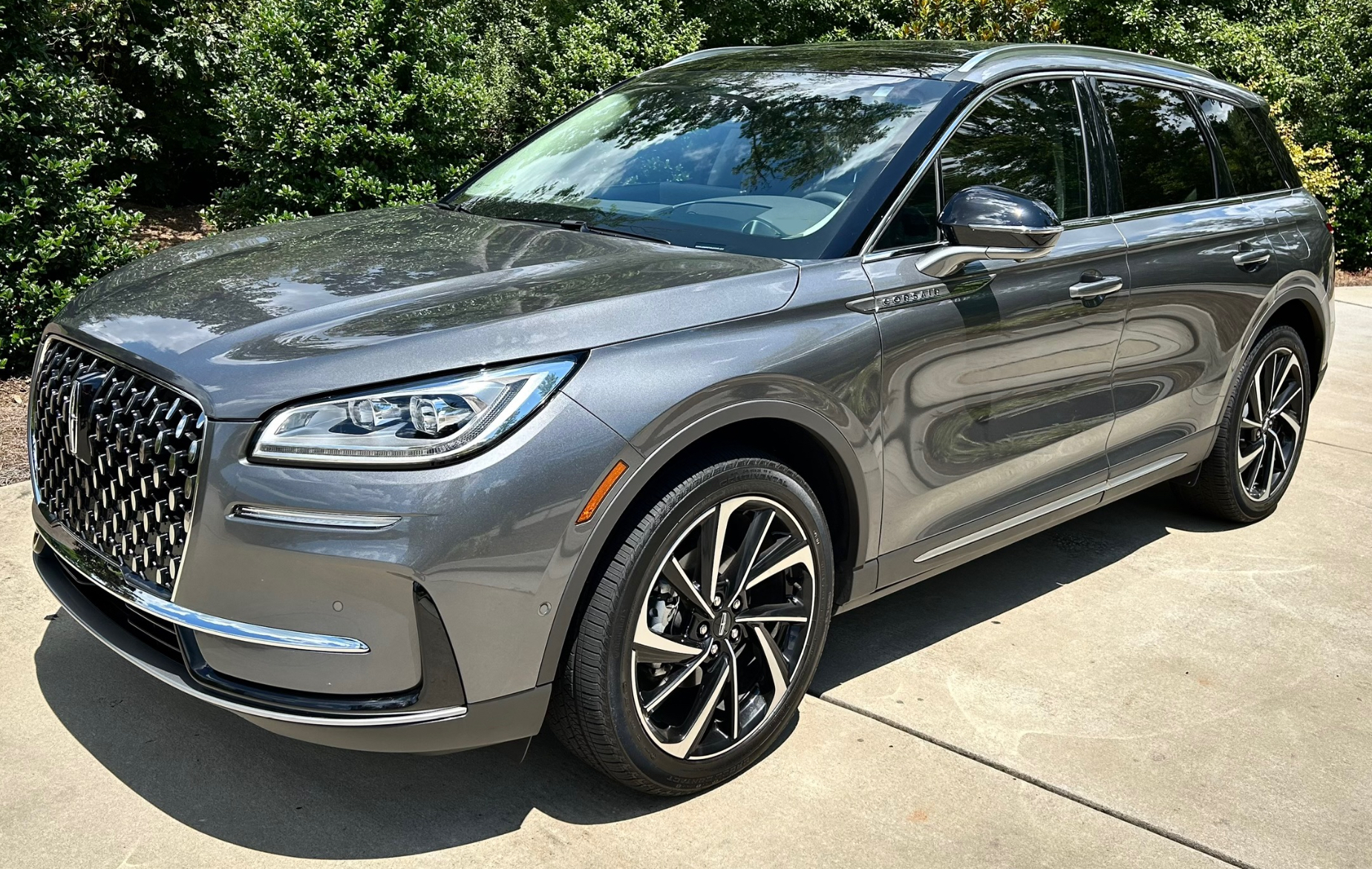
Lincoln Corsair 2023 facelift front (US)

=== 2027 facelift ===
A second facelift for the North American market Corsair was unveiled on 26 August 2026. Its front and rear fascias have been redesigned to resemble the pre-facelift Nautilus and facelifted Aviator, including a larger grille, updated headlights and a rear light bar. Five new exterior colors and new wheels ranging from 18 to 20 inches are available. The interior features a new one-piece seat design and a new interior theme, though it forgoes the Chinese-market 27-inch display including the passenger display. Only one powertrain is available across the entire model range - a hybrid setup combining a 2.0-liter four-cylinder engine with two electric motors, producing an increased total of 305 hp (227 kW). Unlike the previous plug-in hybrid model, the new powertrain does not have a pure electric driving range. Only the Premiere and Reserve trims remain. All models are imported from Chongqing, China.

== Safety ==
The Corsair was an IIHS Top Safety Pick for its first 3 years of production.

2020 Lincoln Corsair IIHS Ratings
Category	Rating
Small overlap front	Good
Moderate overlap front	Good
Side impact (updated test)	Marginal
Roof strength	Good
Head restraints & seats	Good

NHTSA crash test ratings (2020):

- Front Impact Rating:
- Side Impact Rating:
- Rollover Rating:

== Sales ==
Calendar year	United States	China
2019	25,815	—N/a
2020	26,227	30,367
2021	22,790	45,779
2022	27,668	37,085
2023	24,384	28,433
2024	27,513	16,046
2025	26,566	6,394
