= Ford Kuga =

Sport utility vehicle manufactured by Ford

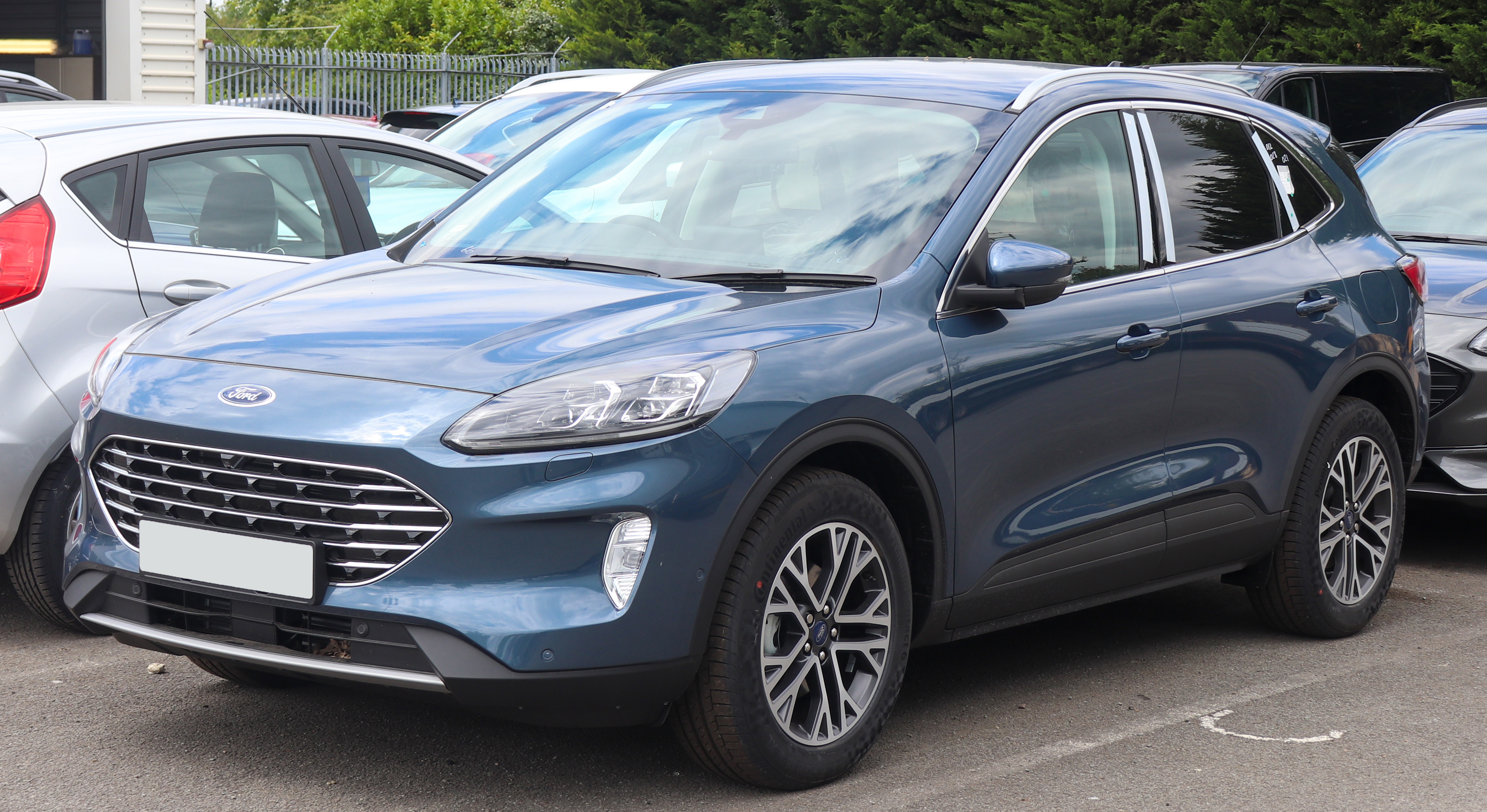

Overview
- Manufacturer: Ford
- Also called: Ford Escape (2012–2026)
- Production: 2008–present

Body and chassis
- Class: Compact crossover SUV (C)
- Body style: 5-door SUV
- Layout: Front-engine, front-wheel drive or all-wheel drive

Chronology
- Predecessor: Ford Escape/Maverick (Europe)
- Successor: Ford Territory (Middle East (excluding Israel), Africa, Latin America, Taiwan, and Southeast Asia (excluding Singapore))

The Ford Kuga is a compact crossover SUV (C-segment) manufactured by Ford since 2008, mainly for the European market, and now in its third generation. Both front-wheel drive and four-wheel drive are offered.

The Kuga was originally European-designed and sold in Europe and a few other markets, but beginning in 2012 for the 2013 model year, it was marketed in North America as the Ford Escape. The Ford Kuga is marketed as the Ford Escape in North America, Australia, the Middle East, and several countries in the Americas.

== Name ==
The vehicle name, Kuga, may refer to another Ford automobile, the Mercury Cougar. The final Mercury Cougar from 1998 to 2002 was sold outside of the United States as the Ford Cougar. Kuga means plague in Bosnian, Croatian, Serbian, and Slovenian languages. Its sales are reportedly lower in the region due to the unfortunate naming choice.

== First generation (C394; 2008) ==
First generation
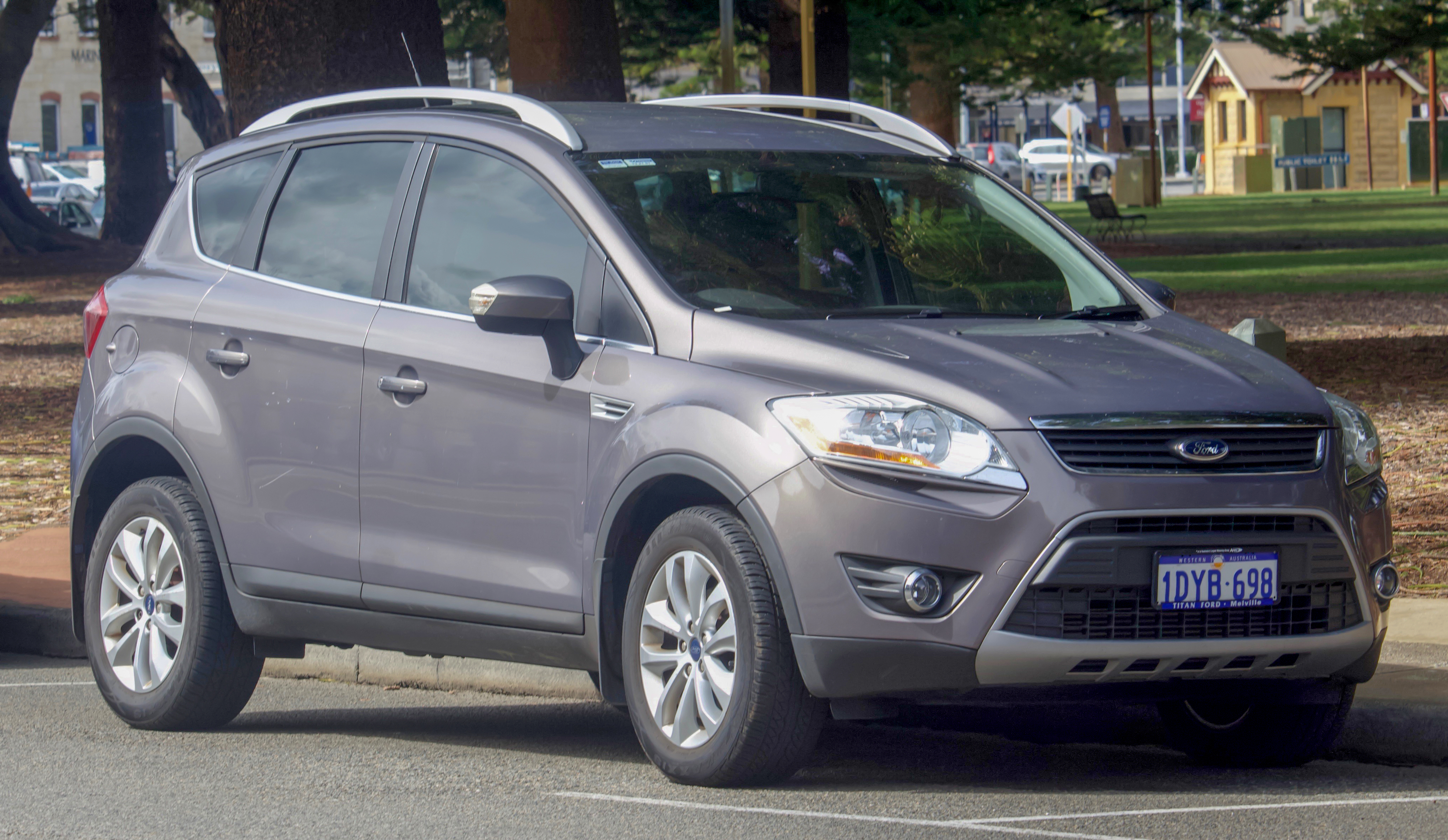

Overview
- Production: February 2008 – 2013
- Assembly: Germany: Saarlouis (SB&A)

Body and chassis
- Platform: Ford C1 platform
- Related: Ford Focus (second generation, Europe); Ford Focus C-Max; Ford C-Max

Powertrain
- Engine: Petrol: 2.5 L Duratec I5 turbo; Diesel: 2.0 L Duratorq TDCi I4 turbo
- Transmission: 6-speed Durashift manual; 5-speed Durashift automatic; 6-speed PowerShift dual-clutch automatic

Dimensions
- Wheelbase: 2,690 mm (105.9 in)
- Length: 4,443 mm (174.9 in)
- Width: 1,842 mm (72.5 in)
- Height: 1,710 mm (67.3 in)
- Kerb weight: 1,613 kg (3,556 lb)

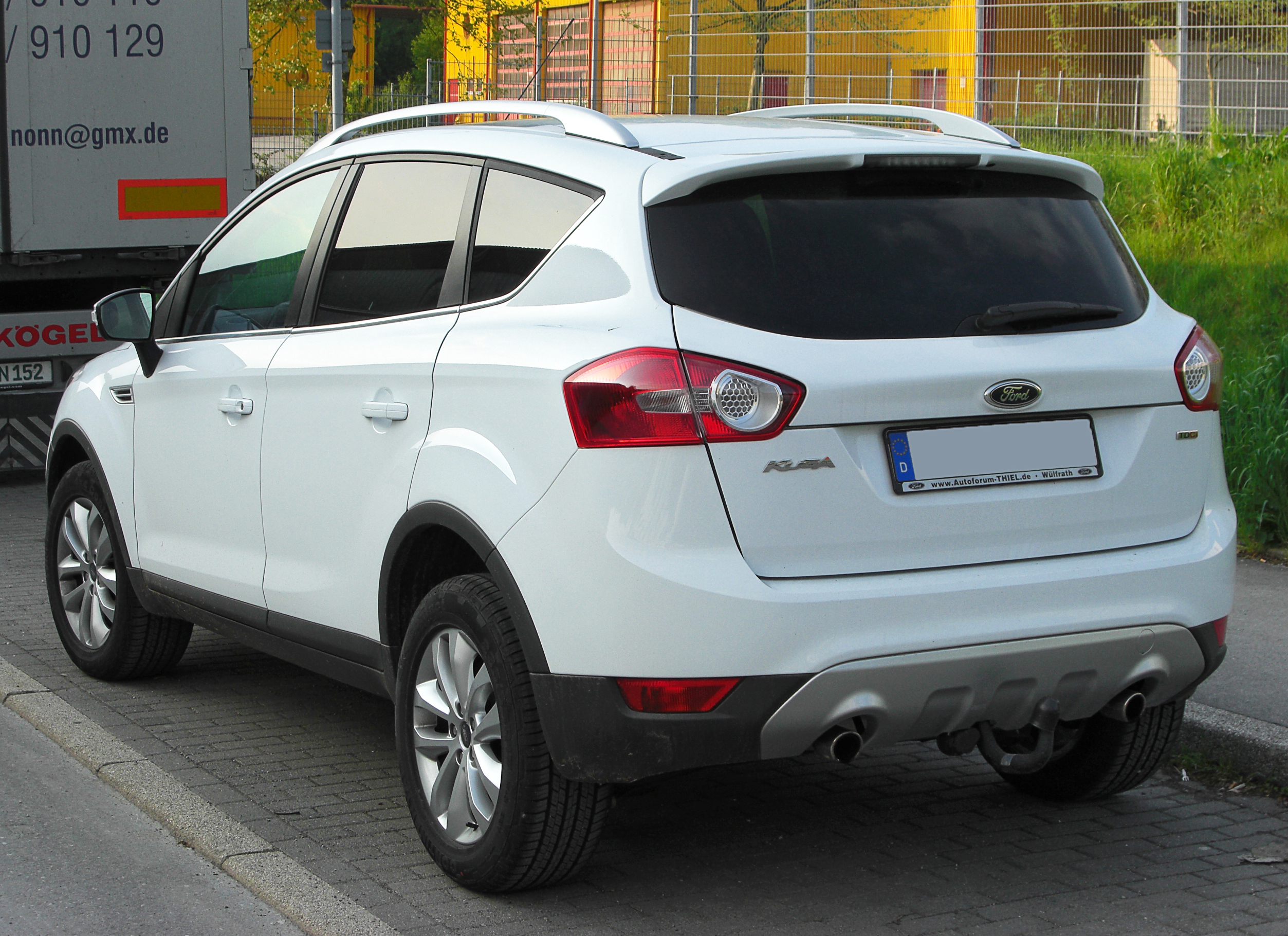
Ford Kuga 2.0 TDCi (rear view)

The Kuga went on sale in the first half of 2008, and was built at Ford's plant in Saarlouis, Germany. In the United Kingdom, emphasising the car's premium market aspirations, only high-end Zetec and Titanium specifications are offered. The combined fuel consumption is 44.1 mpg_{‑imp} (6.41 L/100 km; 36.7 mpg_{‑US}) and the CO_{2} emissions are 169 g/km. It is based on the C1 platform, which also forms the underpinnings of the Ford Focus and Ford C-Max.

The first-generation Kuga was presented in September 2007, having its world premiere at the Frankfurt Motor Show.

=== Engines ===
Petrol

- 2.5 L Duratec turbo I5, 200 PS (147 kW; 197 hp)

Diesel

- 2.0 L Duratorq, 136 PS (100 kW; 134 hp)
- 2.0 L Duratorq, 163 PS (120 kW; 161 hp) AWD and powershift models

=== Worldwide markets ===
A report from 20 July 2007 indicated Ford executives were considering the prospects of sales in North America. This idea was later scrapped, after they determined the car could not be sold both competitively priced and at a profit in the United States, due to the current dollar-to-euro exchange rate.

On 24 July 2008, WDIV-TV announced that Ford was reconsidering bringing the Kuga to North America after all. On 22 October 2009, news leaked that Ford would build the Kuga at its Louisville plant, possibly as the 2012 Ford Escape.

On 23 June 2010, Ford announced it would end production of the second-generation Escape in 2011 in anticipation of the Kuga's North American launch as the next-generation Escape. The Ford Kuga has also been available in Argentina since 2010; in Japan, South Africa, and New Zealand since 2011; and in Australia since March 2012.

A facelift was released at the end of 2010, after being revealed in July 2010.

The redesigned Kuga formed the basis for the 2013 Ford Escape sold in the United States. Ford announced in May 2010 that it would build unspecified hybrids at a plant in Valencia, Spain, and likely offer a hybrid option of both vehicles. The Kuga Hybrid would be Ford's first hybrid to be sold in Europe, though it has sold over 100,000 Escape Hybrids and Mercury Mariner Hybrids in the United States since 2004.

=== Safety ===
Euro NCAP test results Ford Kuga 2.0 diesel 'Trend' (LHD) (2008)
Test	Score	Rating
Adult occupant:	33	5 /5 stars
Child occupant:	38	4 /5 stars
Pedestrian:	20	3 /4 stars

== Second generation (C520; 2012) ==
Second generation
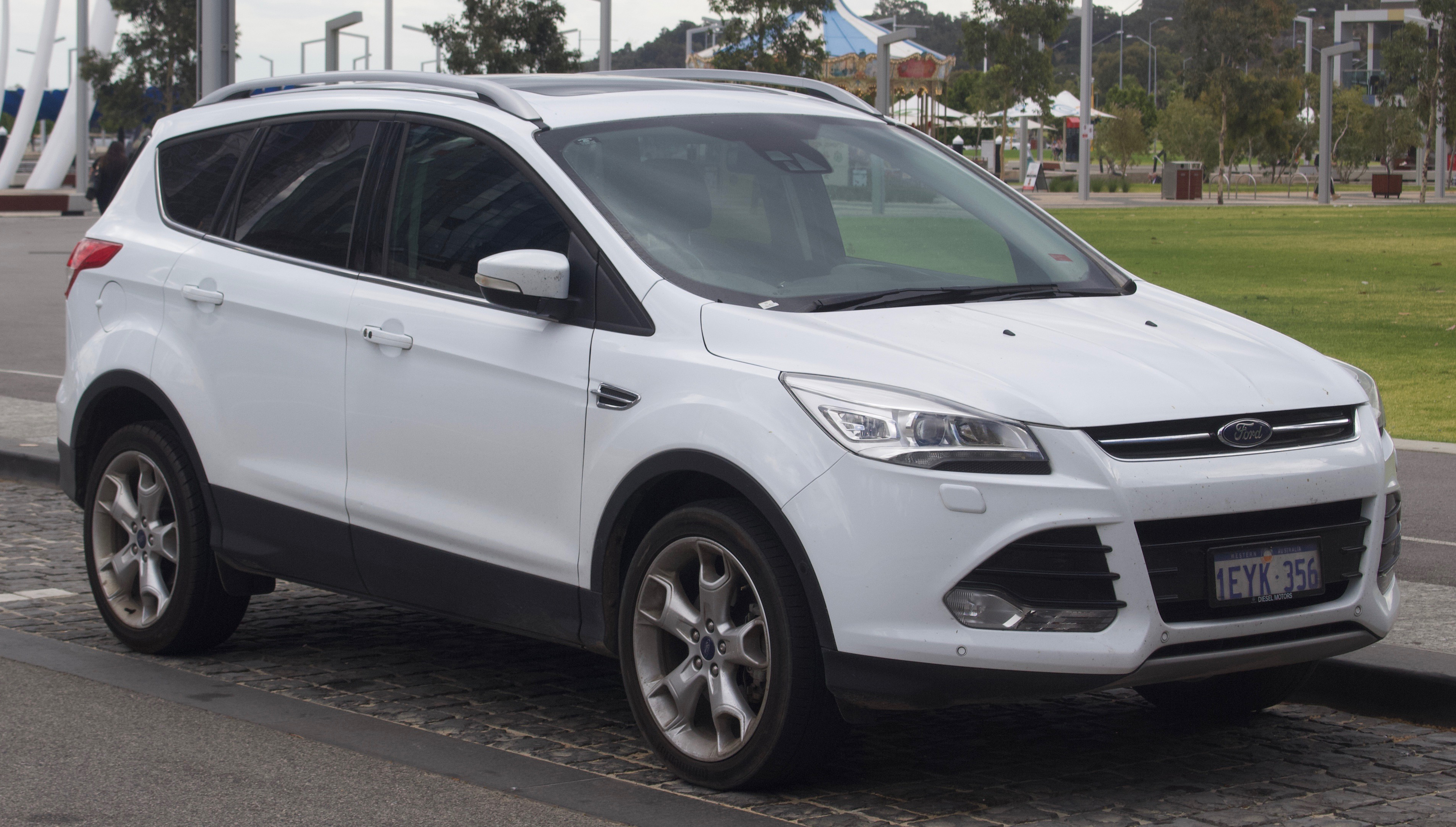
- Ford Kuga Titanium (pre-facelift)

Overview
- Also called: Ford Escape (Third generation)
- Production: 2012–2019 (Europe); 2013–2021 (China)
- Assembly: Spain: Valencia (FV); China: Chongqing (Changan Ford); Russia: Yelabuga (FS); United States: Louisville, Kentucky (Louisville Assembly Plant, Escape)
- Designer: Patrick Verhee, Stefan Lamm, Andrea Di Buduo, Kemal Curić (2010)

Body and chassis
- Platform: Ford C1 platform
- Related: Ford Focus (third generation); Ford C-Max (second generation); Lincoln MKC

Powertrain
- Engine: Petrol: 1.5 L EcoBoost I4 turbo; 1.6 L EcoBoost I4 turbo; 2.0 L EcoBoost I4 turbo; 2.5 L Duratec I4; Diesel: 1.5 L Duratorq TDCi I4 turbo; 2.0 L Duratorq I4 turbo
- Transmission: 6-speed manual 6-speed 6F35 automatic 6-speed PowerShift automatic

Dimensions
- Wheelbase: 2,690 mm (105.9 in)
- Length: 4,524 mm (178.1 in)
- Width: 1,838 mm (72.4 in)
- Height: 1,702 mm (67.0 in)
- Kerb weight: 1,580–1,707 kg (3,483–3,763 lb)

The second-generation Kuga was primarily developed by Ford of Europe, developed under the "One Ford" policy, which stipulates that Ford designs only one model in each segment to be sold globally. The rebadged name Ford Escape is used in North America, replacing the model of the same name there.

The Kuga follows on from the Vertrek concept, developed over nine months at Ford's Cologne design studio. For the production model, designers and engineers in Cologne were responsible for the body design and C1 platform, the upper body and interior come from Detroit, and powertrains are manufactured by Ford Dagenham.

The patents from January 2011 list the designers as Patrick Verhee, Stefan Lamm, Kemal Curic, and Andrea Di Buduo from Ford in Germany. Final assembly for European models is conducted at the Ford Valencia Plant in Spain. Ford claims the Kuga and Escape have 80% parts commonality.

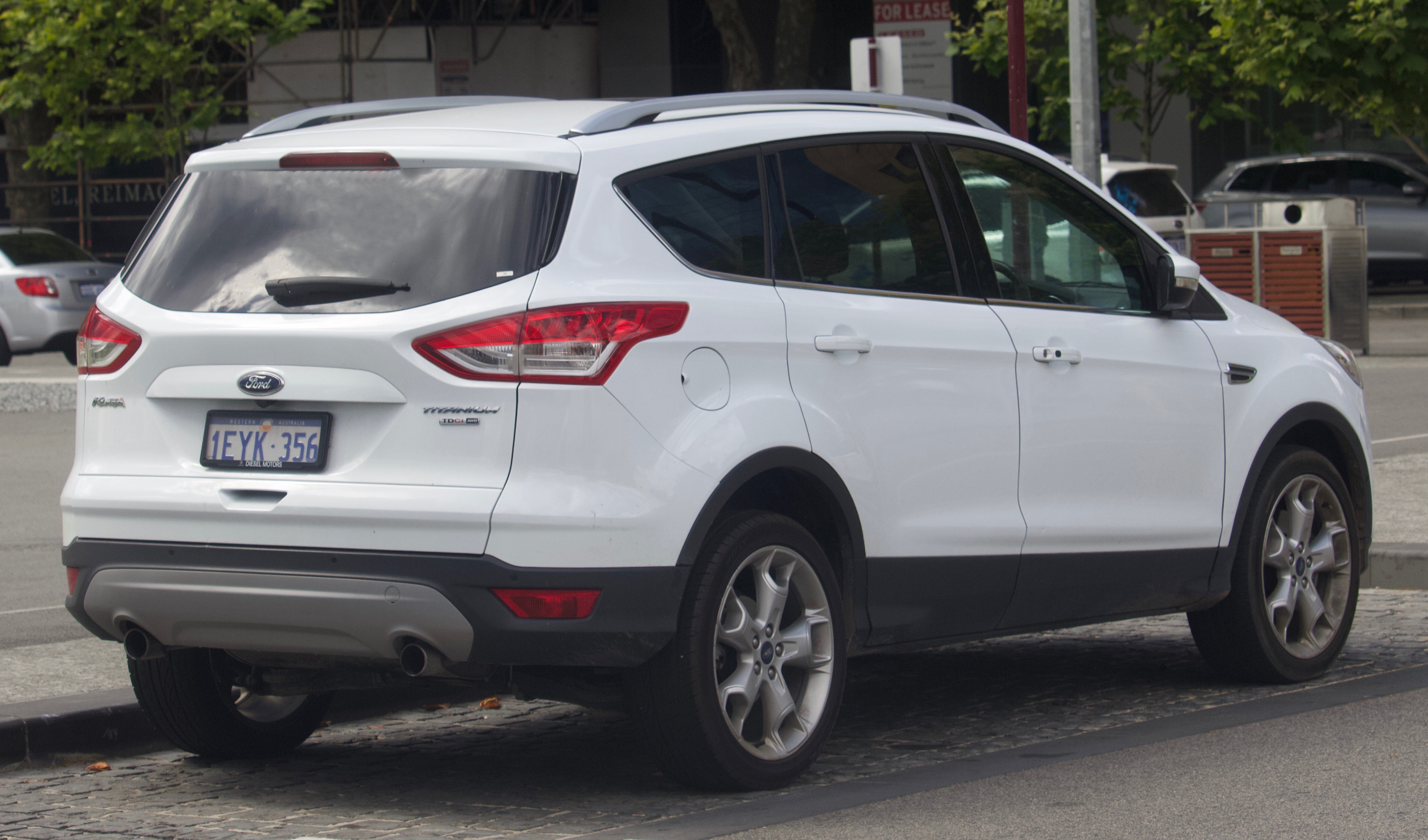
Ford Kuga Titanium (pre-facelift)

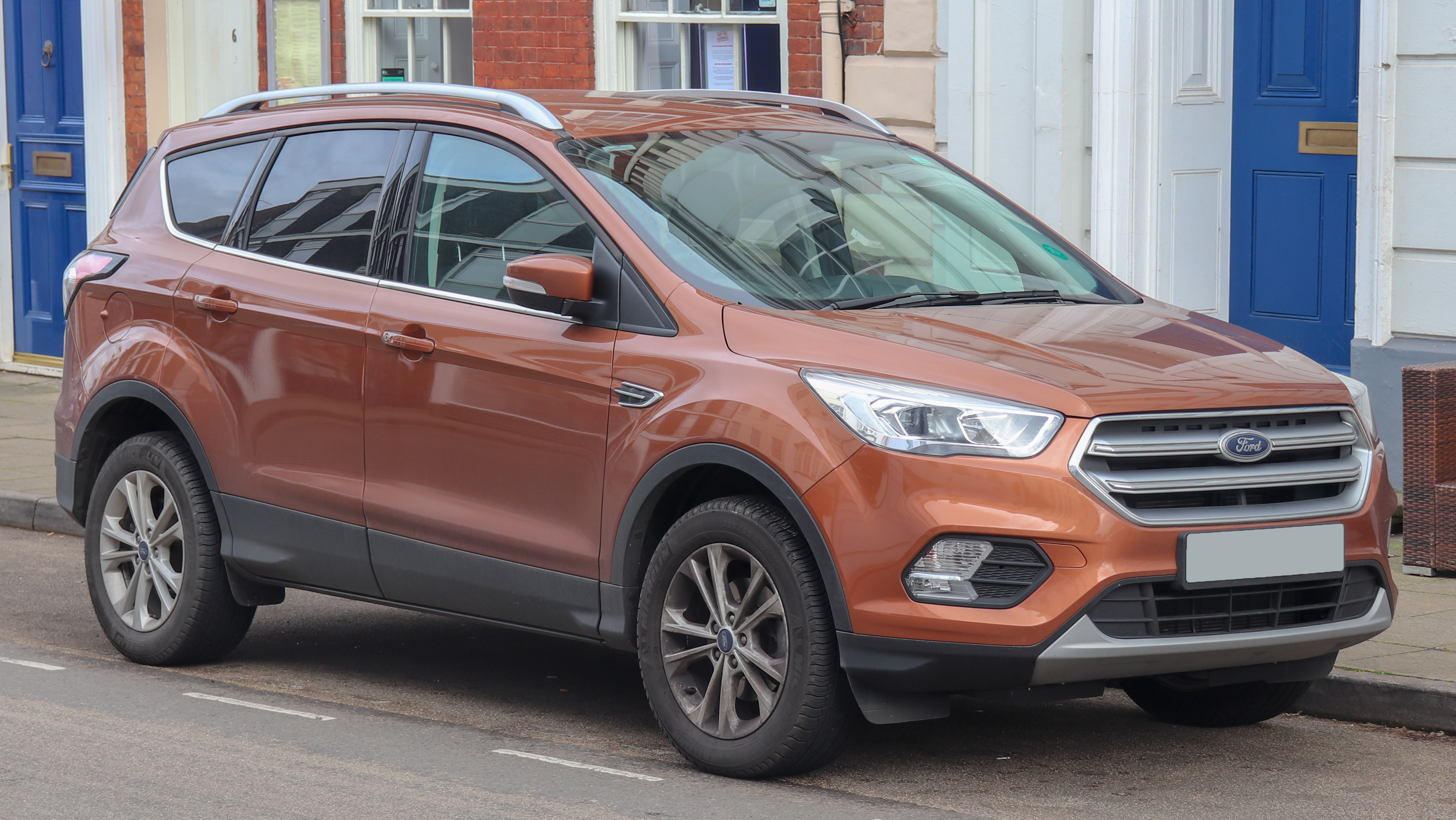
Ford Kuga Titanium (facelift)

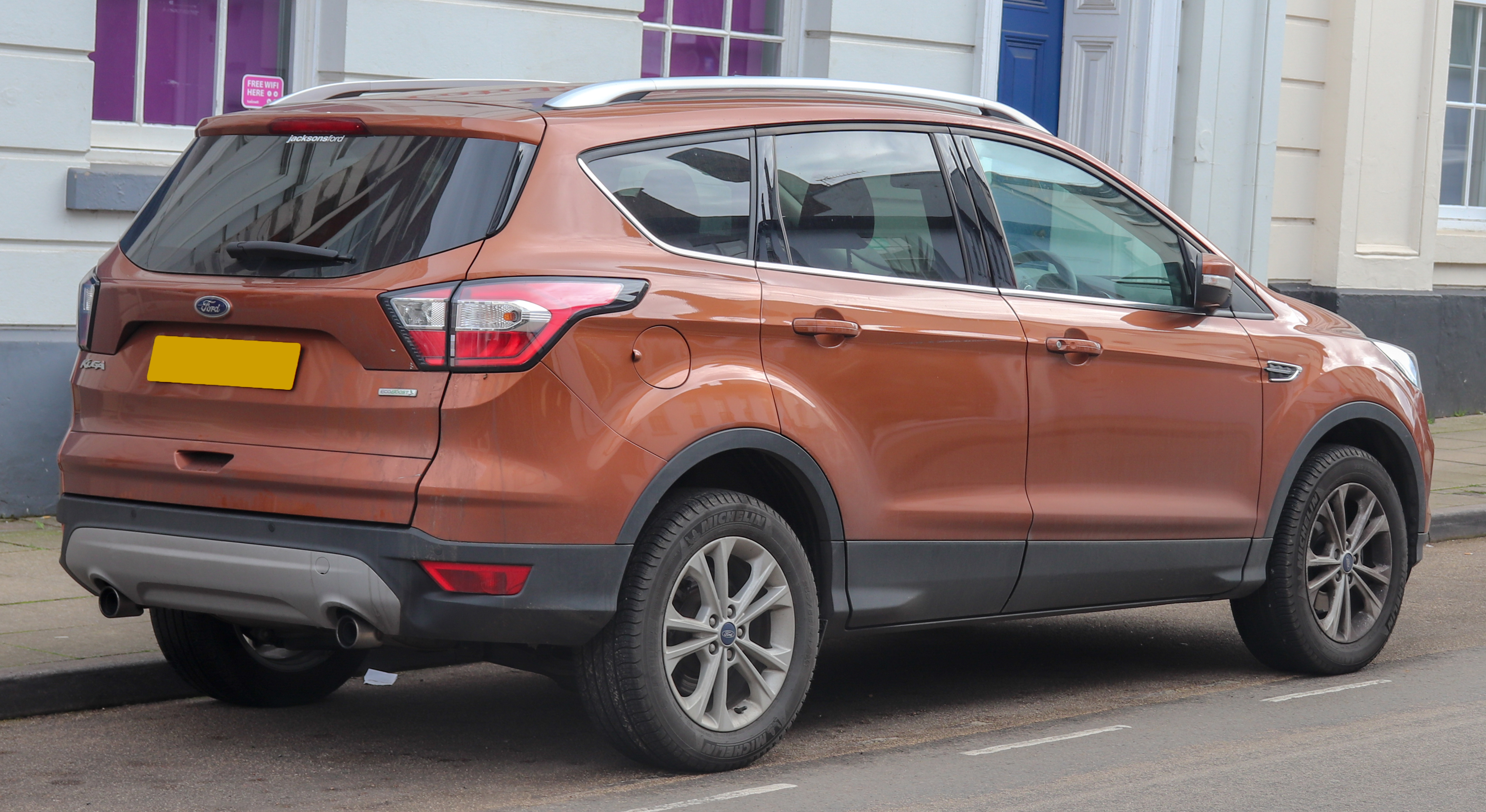
Ford Kuga Titanium (facelift)

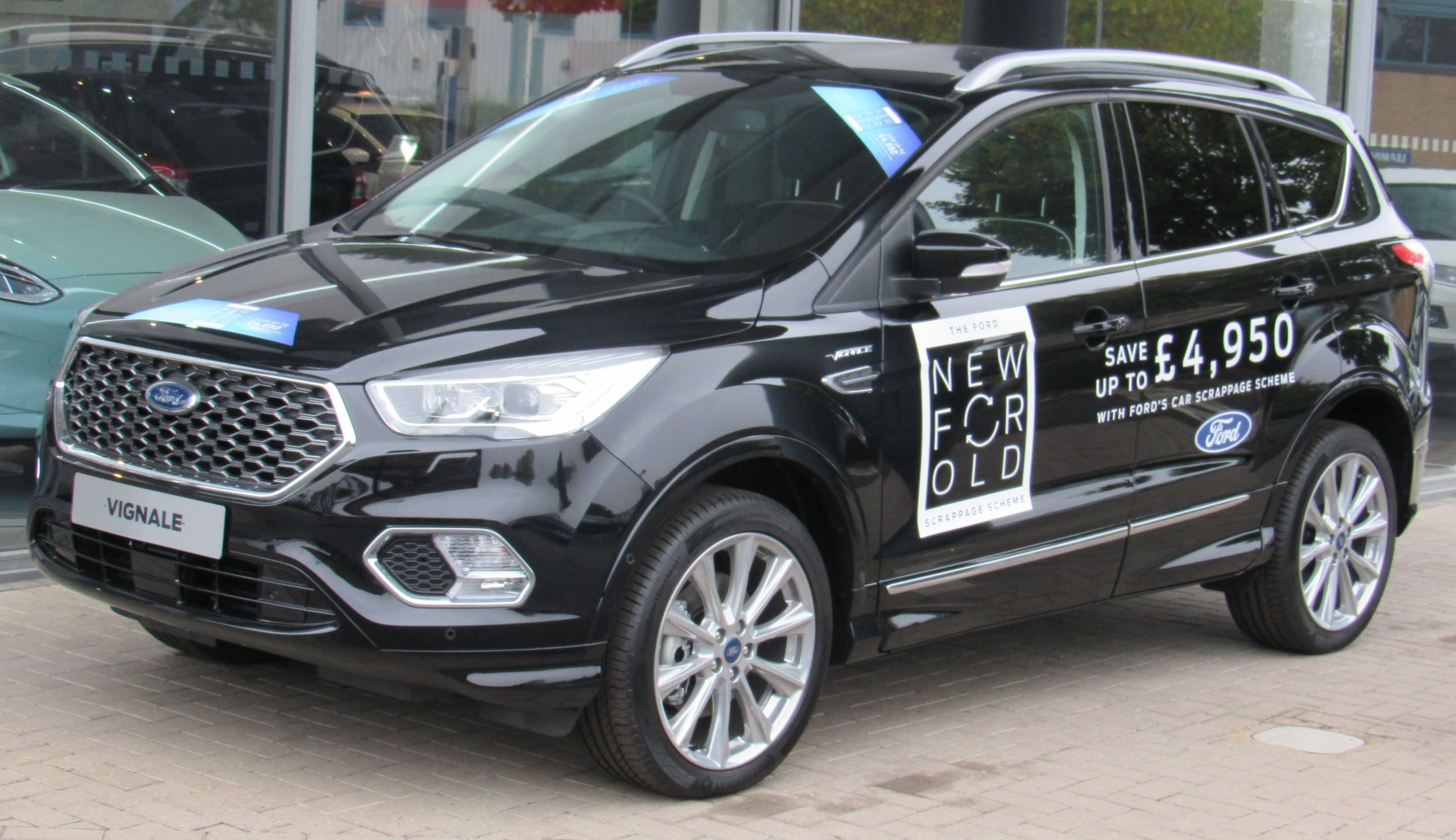
Ford Kuga Vignale (facelift)

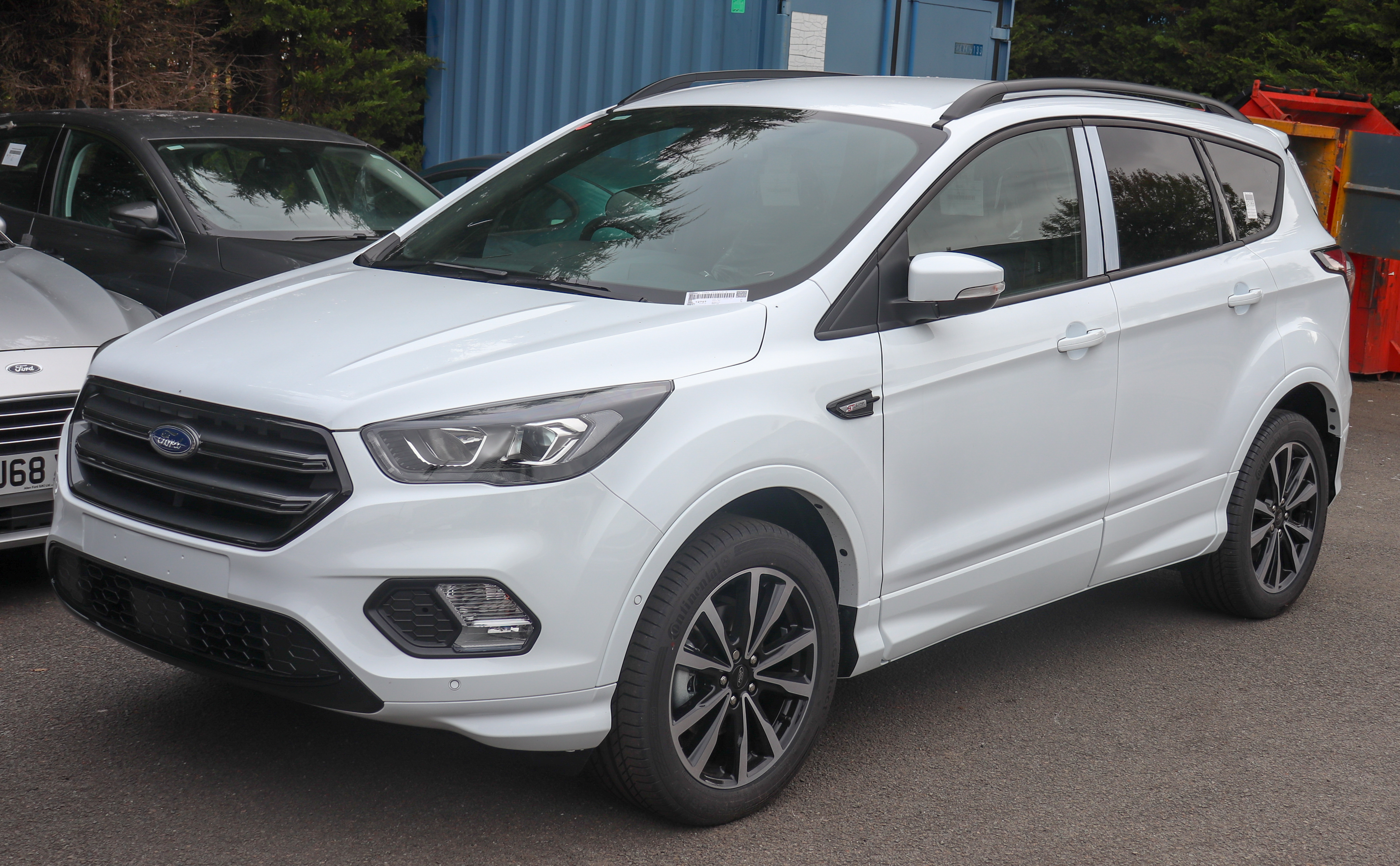
Ford Kuga ST-Line (facelift)

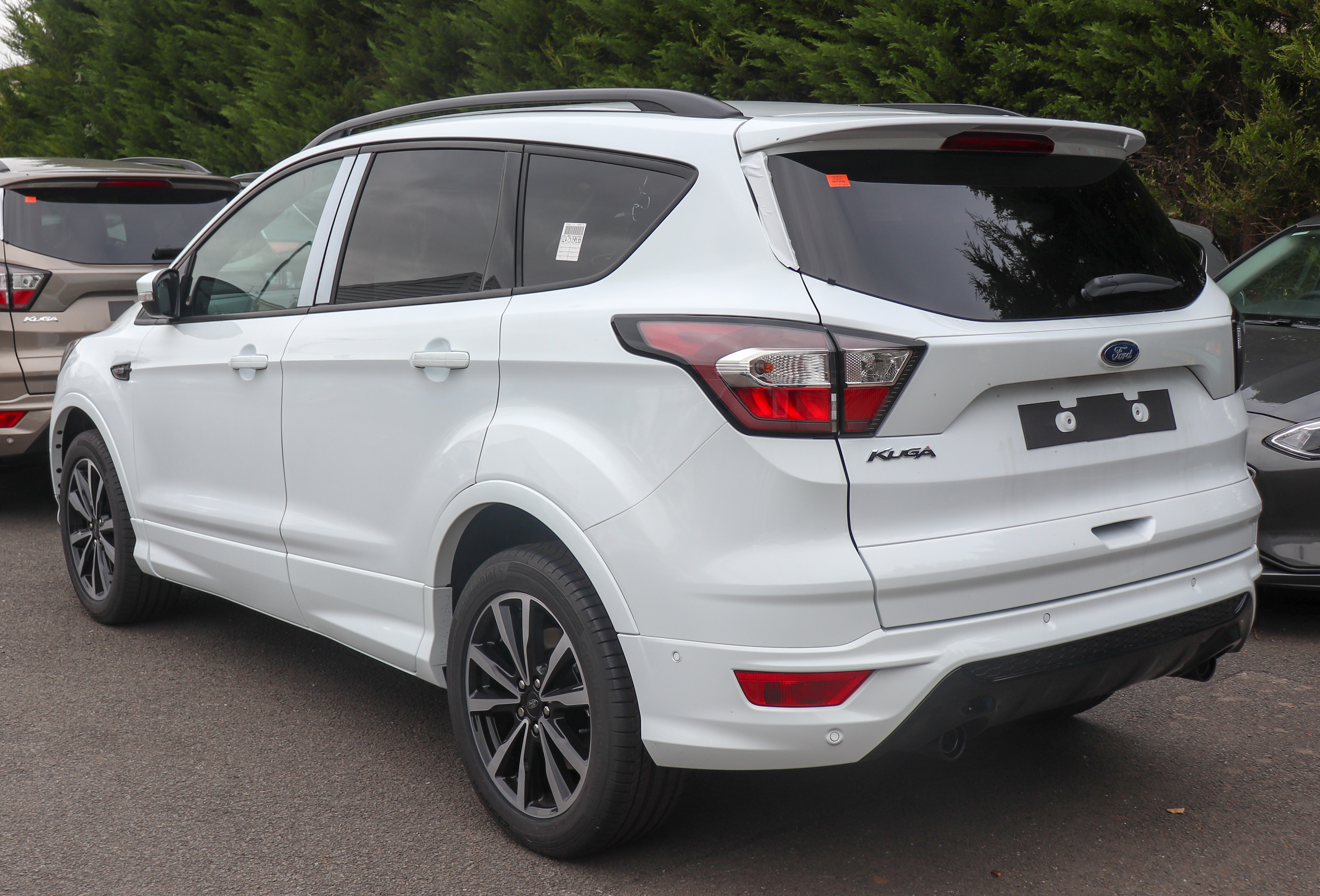
Ford Kuga ST-Line (facelift)

=== Powertrain ===
Petrol

- 1.5 L EcoBoost turbo I4, 150 PS (110 kW; 148 hp)
- 1.6 L EcoBoost turbo I4, 150 PS (110 kW; 148 hp)
- 1.6 L EcoBoost turbo I4, 182 PS (134 kW; 180 hp) 2WD and AWD models
- 2.0 L EcoBoost turbo I4, 242 PS (178 kW; 239 hp) AWD models

Diesel

- 2.0 L Duratorq, 140 PS (103 kW; 138 hp)
- 2.0 L Duratorq, 163 PS (120 kW; 161 hp)
- 2.0 L Duratorq, 150 PS (110 kW; 148 hp)
- 2.0 L Duratorq, 180 PS (132 kW; 178 hp)

Ford Europe debuted the facelifted model at Mobile World Congress in Barcelona in February 2016.

=== Fire hazard ===
==== South Africa ====
In South Africa, onwards from 2015, numerous Ford Kugas of the 1.6 L EcoBoost variant caught fire. In December 2016, Ford South Africa requested that all local Kuga owners take their vehicles in for a safety inspection. As of 16 January 2017, at least 46 Kugas in South Africa had been destroyed by fire, and Ford South Africa had confirmed that a total of 39 incidents had been reported to the company. By 18 January 2017, the number of incidents had reached 50, with 13 in 2017 alone. Between November 2015 and December 2017, 72 vehicles suffered fires. By 4 February 2019, more than 80 incidents had occurred, with one as recently as 1 February 2019.

On 16 January 2017, Ford South Africa and South Africa's National Consumer Commission held a media briefing to announce a safety recall of the affected Kuga model, affecting "4556 1.6 L EcoBoost models that were built between December 2012 and February 2014". The NCC said that it had decided to exercise its authority to authorize a recall on safety grounds, and had then been informed that Ford South Africa had decided to implement a recall.

Between January 2017 and January 2018, Ford implemented three safety recalls on the vehicles. Ford South Africa identified the mechanism leading to the majority of fires as overheating caused by a lack of coolant circulation, which could lead to cracking of the cylinder head, resulting in an oil leak and subsequent fire in the engine compartment. The proposed solution would be first to replace and check affected components and systems, and later to improve the cooling and warning systems.

In December 2019, the National Consumer Commission fined the Ford Motor Company of Southern Africa R35 million in connection with the numerous fires, in addition to compensation payments already offered to affected parties.

==== New Zealand ====
Television New Zealand reported that a Ford Kuga Titanium 2013 burst into flames in December 2016. The incident is being investigated by Ford NZ. Ford NZ say that the models being investigated in South Africa were built between 2012 and 2014 and fitted with a 1.6 L EcoBoost engine. They also say differences exist between the models sold in South Africa and those sold in New Zealand.

Until the investigation into the New Zealand incident has been completed, no decision can be made about recalling the 1,300 cars of the same model sold in New Zealand.

=== Safety ===
ANCAP test results Ford Kuga all Trend and Titanium variants (2011)
Test	Score
Overall	5 /5 stars
Frontal offset	12.69/16
Side impact	16/16
Pole	2/2
Seat belt reminders	2/3
Whiplash protection	Marginal
Pedestrian protection	Adequate
Electronic stability control	Standard

ANCAP test results Ford Kuga all variants (2013)
Test	Score
Overall	5 /5 stars
Frontal offset	15.33/16
Side impact	16/16
Pole	2/2
Seat belt reminders	2/3
Whiplash protection	Good
Pedestrian protection	Adequate
Electronic stability control	Standard

Euro NCAP test results Ford Kuga 2.0 diesel 'Trend' (LHD) (2012)
Test	Points	%
Overall:	5 /5 stars	
Adult occupant:	33.8	94%
Child occupant:	42	86%
Pedestrian:	25.1	70%
Safety assist:	7	100%

== Third generation (C482; 2019) ==
Third generation
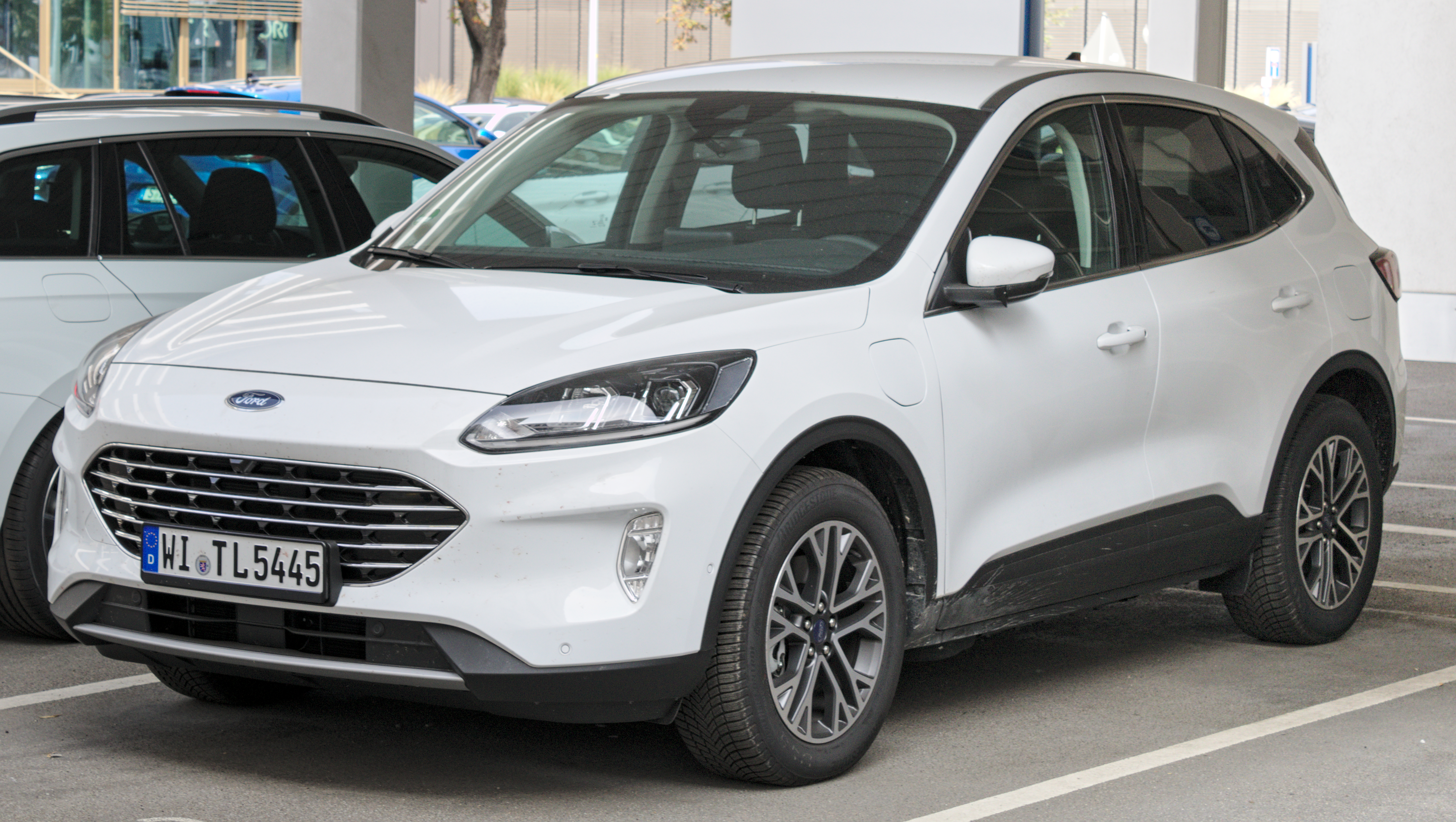

Overview
- Also called: Ford Escape
- Production: 2019–2025 (North America); 2019–present (Europe); 2020–2026 (Taiwan)
- Assembly: Spain: Valencia (Ford Valencia Plant); Germany: Cologne (Cologne Body & Assembly, Vignale trim); United States: Louisville, Kentucky (Louisville Assembly Plant, Escape); China: Chongqing (Changan Ford); Taiwan: Zhongli, Taoyuan (Ford Lio Ho)
- Designer: Andrew Bazinski; Christopher Giroux, Nedzad Mujcinovic, Jordan Demkiw (facelift)

Body and chassis
- Platform: Ford C2
- Related: Ford Focus (fourth generation); Ford Bronco Sport; Ford Maverick; Lincoln Corsair

Powertrain
- Engine: Petrol: 1.5 L EcoBoost I3 turbo; 2.0 L EcoBoost I4 turbo; Petrol hybrid: 2.5 L Duratec iVCT I4; Petrol plug-in hybrid: 2.5 L Duratec I4; Diesel: 1.5 L EcoBlue I4 turbo; 2.0 L EcoBlue I4 turbo; 2.0 L EcoBlue I4 turbo mild hybrid
- Electric motor: List: 11.5 kW (15.4 hp) belt-driven integrated starter/generator (BISG) (mild hybrid); 88 kW (120 PS; 118 hp) Permanent-magnet synchronous AC electric motor (hybrid and plug-in hybrid)
- Power output: List: Petrol: 120 PS (118 hp; 88 kW) (1.5 L EcoBoost); 150 PS (148 hp; 110 kW) (1.5 L EcoBoost); 175 PS (173 hp; 129 kW) (1.5 L EcoBoost, non-European markets only); 240 PS (237 hp; 177 kW) (2.0 L EcoBoost); Petrol hybrid: 190 PS (187 hp; 140 kW) (2.5 L Duratec iVCT, combined); Petrol plug-in hybrid: 225 PS (222 hp; 165 kW) (2.5 L Duratec, combined); Diesel: 120 PS (118 hp; 88 kW) (1.5 L EcoBlue); 190 PS (187 hp; 140 kW) (2.0 L EcoBlue); 150 PS (148 hp; 110 kW) (2.0 L EcoBlue, with mild-hybrid)
- Transmission: 6-speed manual; 6-speed Powershift DCT; 8-speed 8F40 automatic; CVT
- Hybrid drivetrain: Mild hybrid; Parallel hybrid; Plug-in hybrid
- Battery: 48 V (mild hybrid); 1.1 kWh lithium-ion (hybrid); 14.4 kWh lithium-ion (plug-in hybrid)

Dimensions
- Wheelbase: 2,690 mm (105.9 in)
- Length: 4,531–4,541 mm (178.4–178.8 in)
- Width: 1,838–1,856 mm (72.4–73.1 in)
- Height: 1,694–1,703 mm (66.7–67.0 in)
- Kerb weight: 1,591–1,716 kg (3,507.6–3,783.1 lb)

The third-generation Ford Kuga made its debut on 2 April 2019; it went on sale in the third quarter of 2019 as a 2020 model for markets in North America (as the fourth-generation Escape for the region). The model has five new engine/transmission combinations, including a plug-in petrol electric hybrid that can go 30 mi (48 km) on electricity, as well as a conventional hybrid, and two turbocharged four-cylinder engines mated to eight-speed automatic transmissions

The third-generation Kuga is the company's first SUV to use the C2 platform, also found in the latest Focus, making it longer and wider, with a more generous wheelbase. Ford claims that the new model is up to 90 kg lighter than the outgoing Kuga.

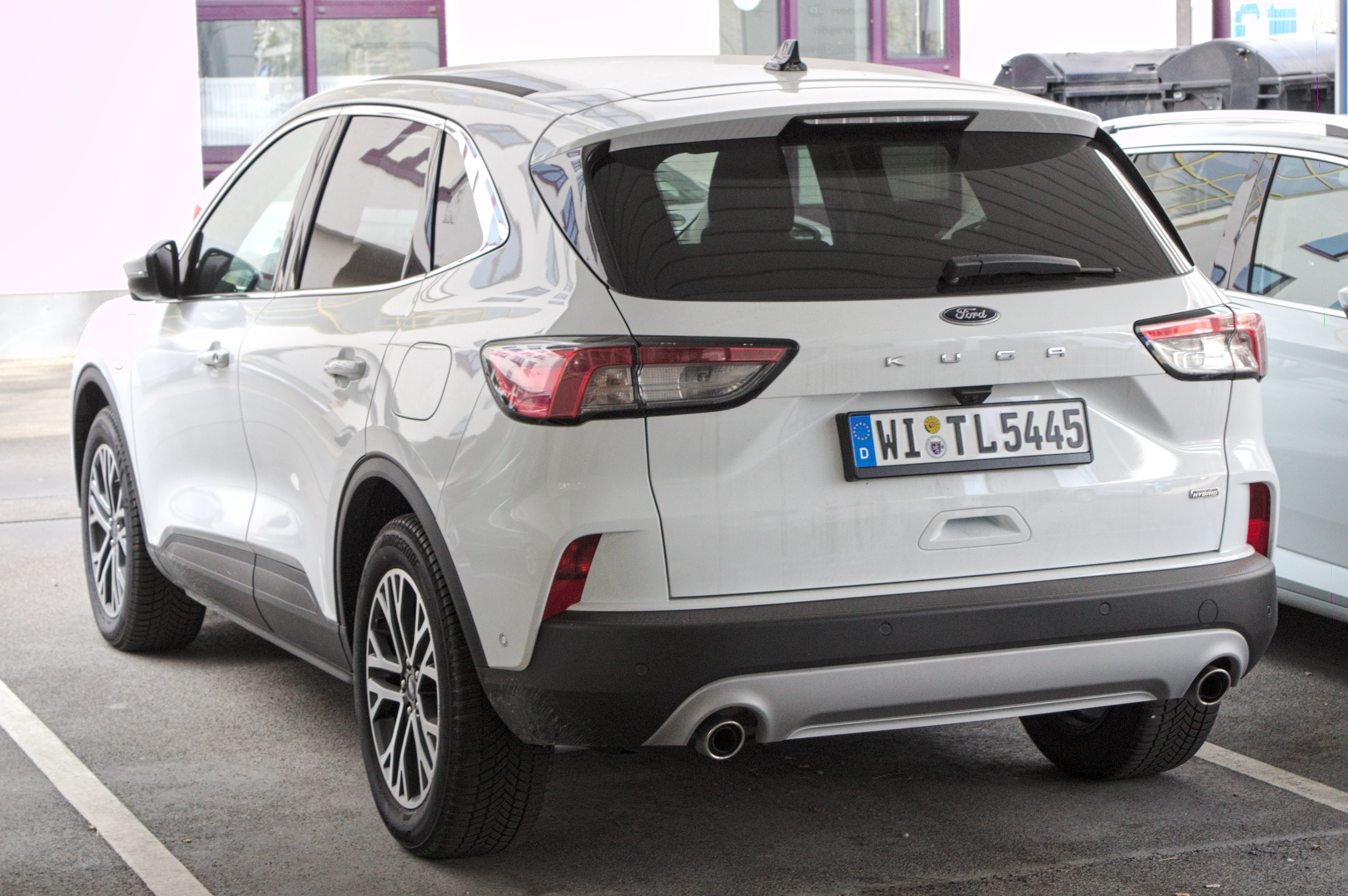
Rear view (Plug-in-Hybrid)

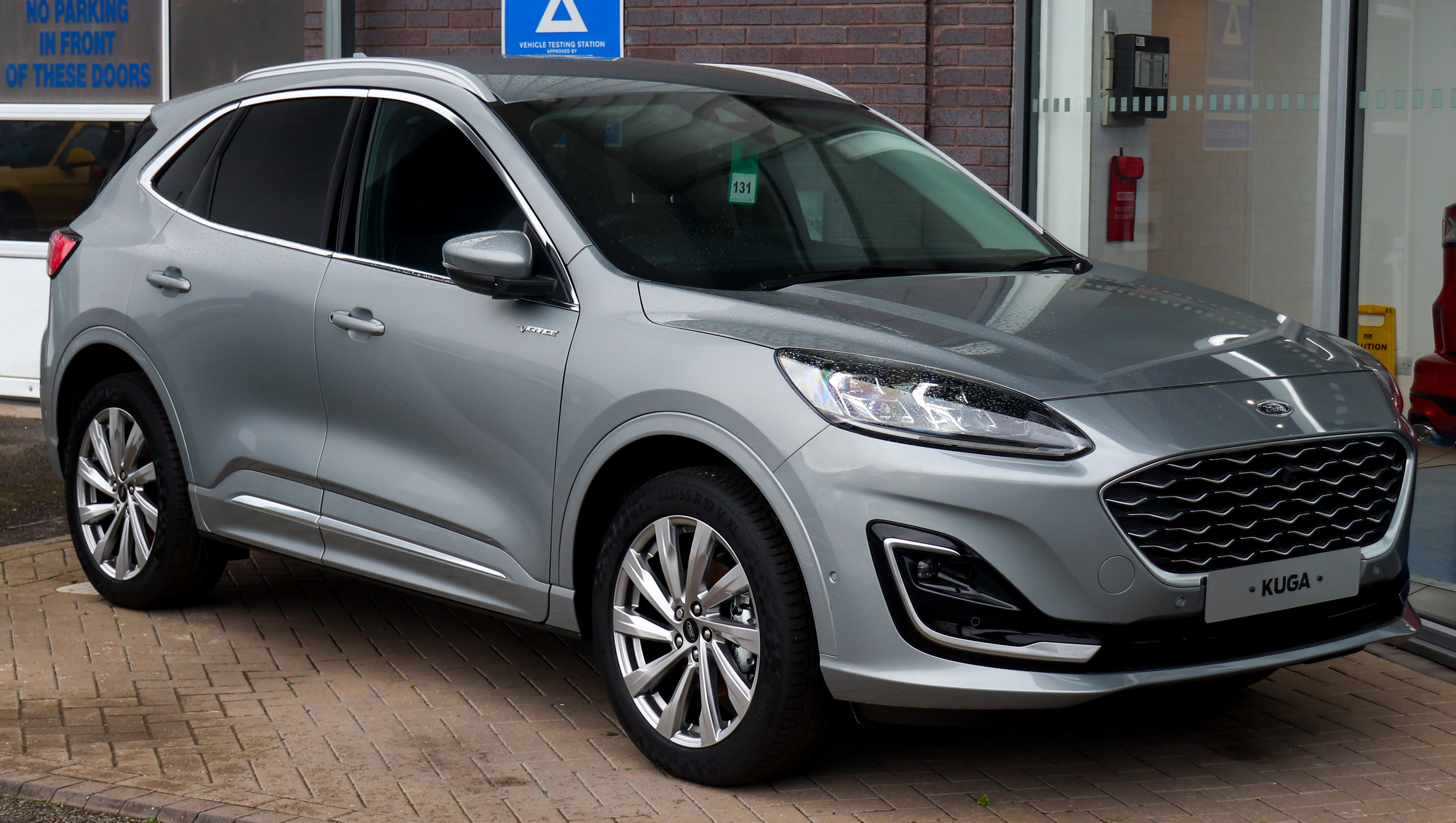
Kuga Vignale

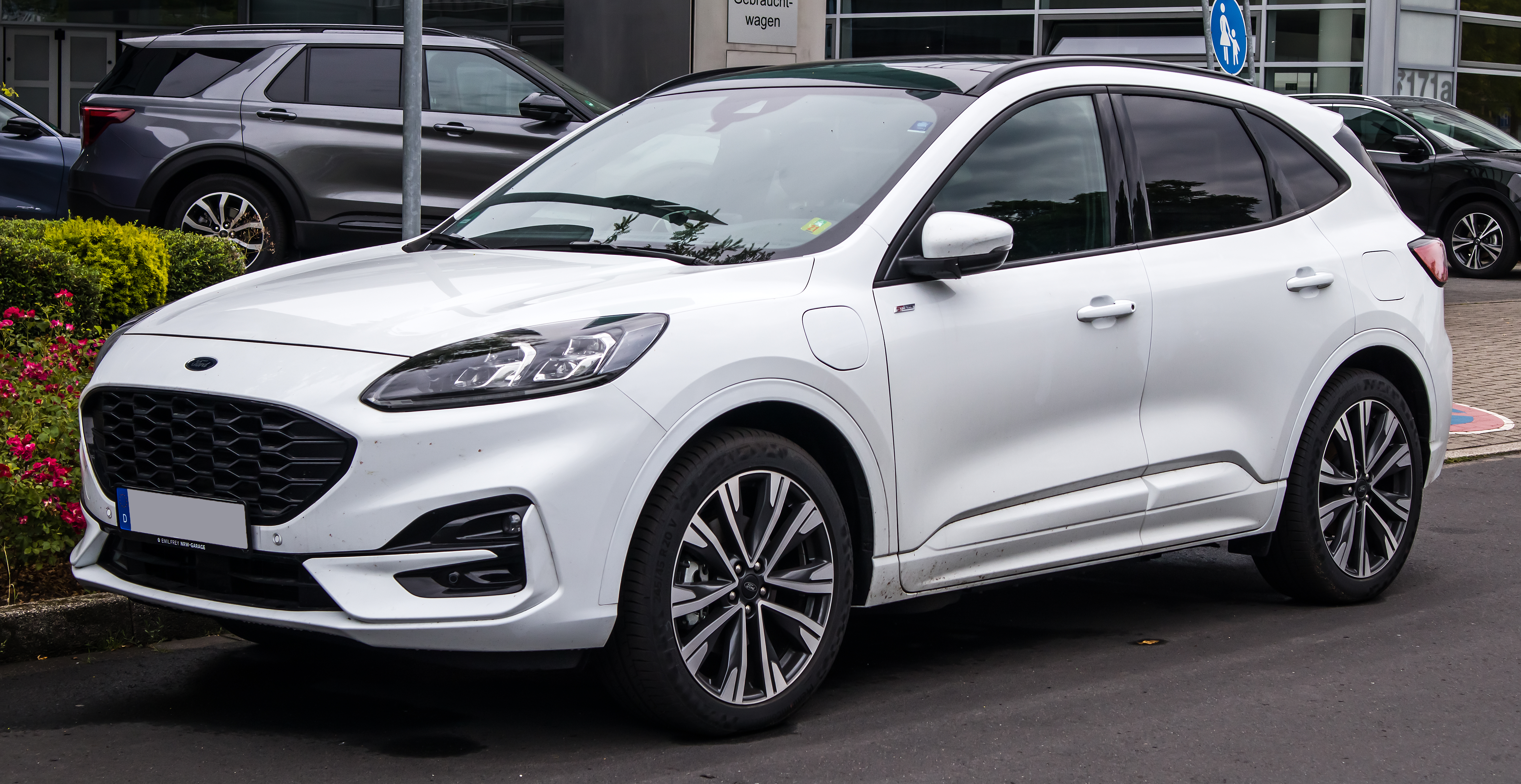
Kuga Plug-in-Hybrid ST-Line

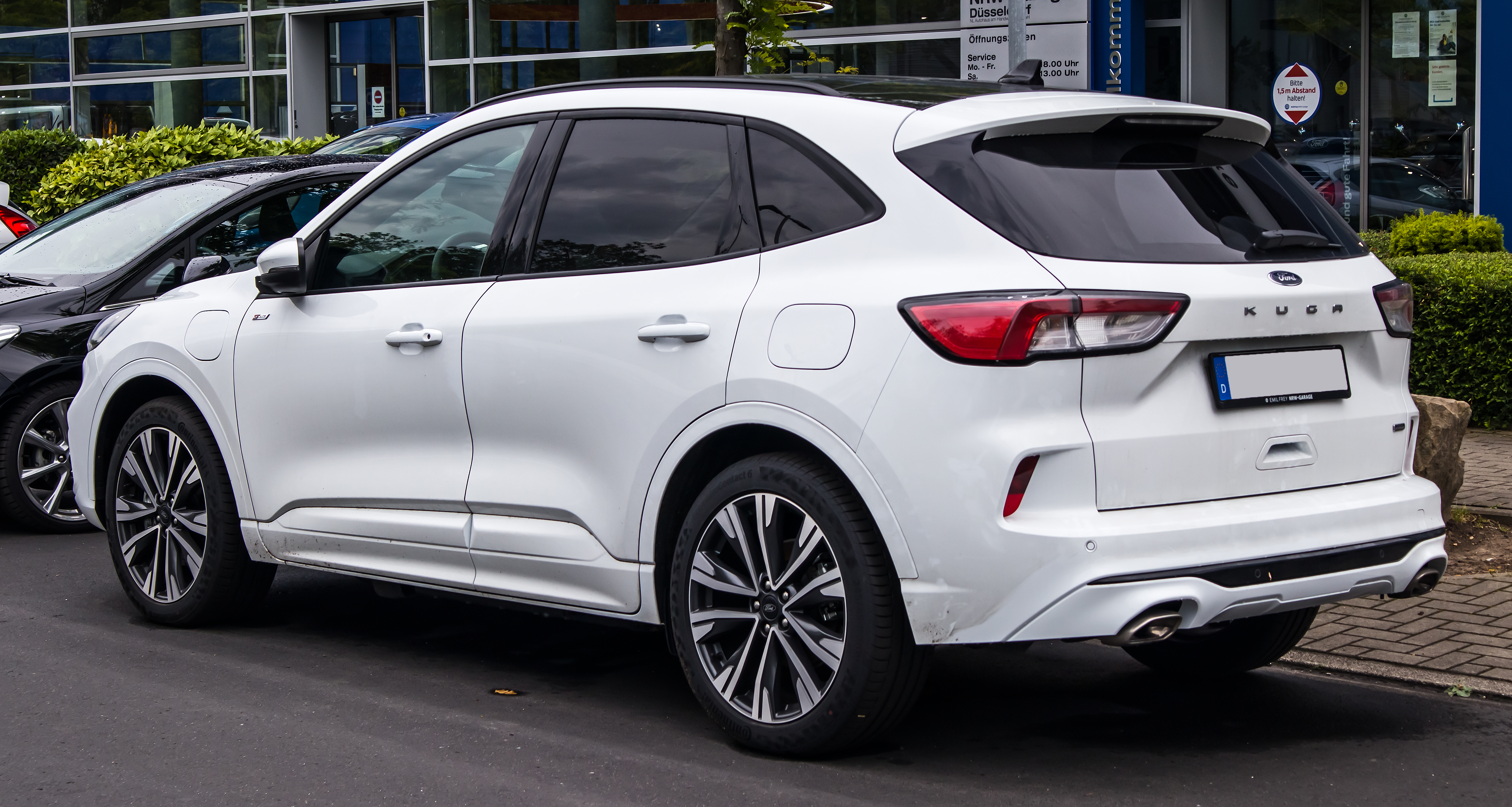
Rear view

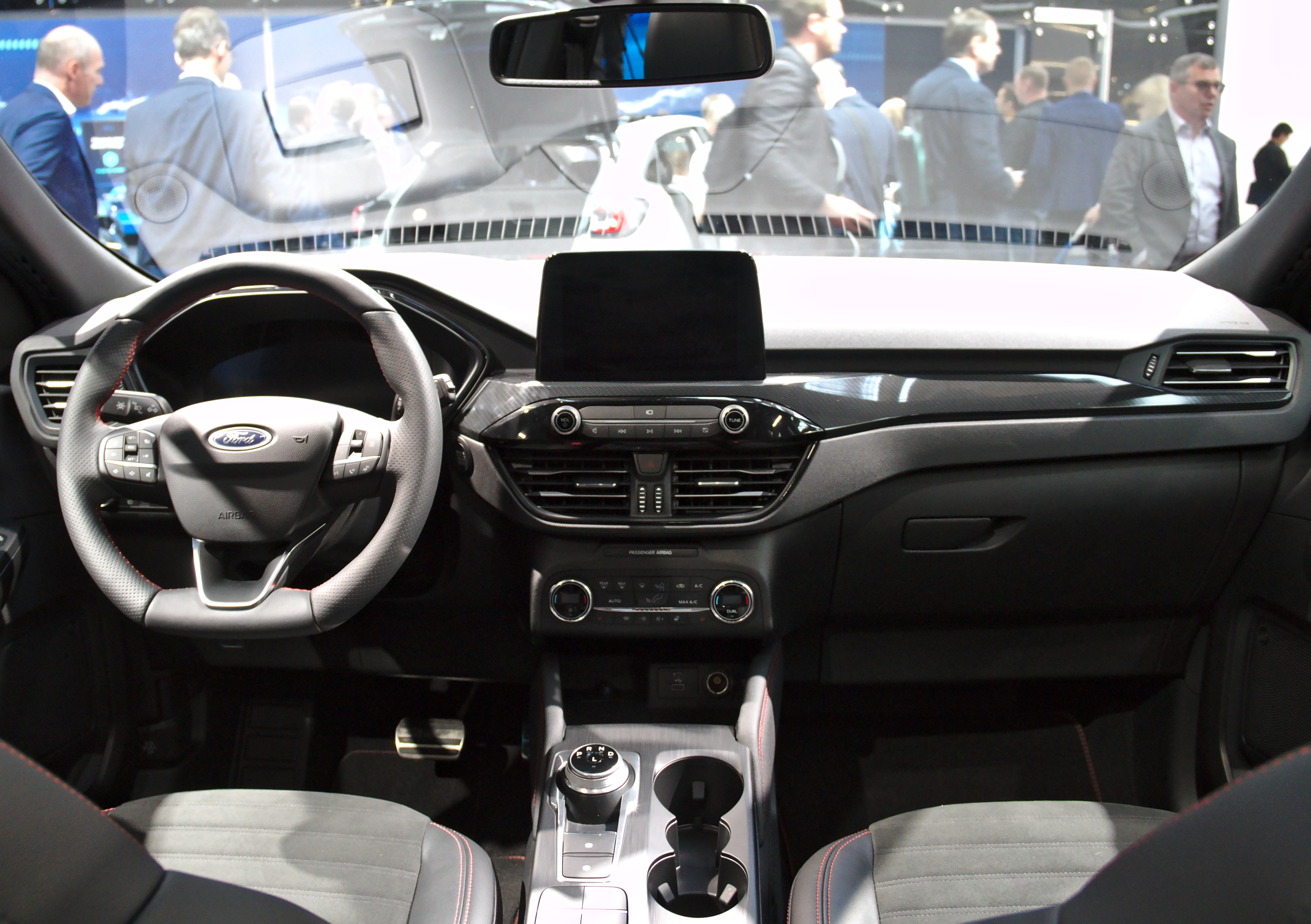
Interior (ST-Line)

=== Facelift ===
The facelifted Kuga was introduced in January 2024, a year after its North American market counterpart, the Escape, received the design refresh.

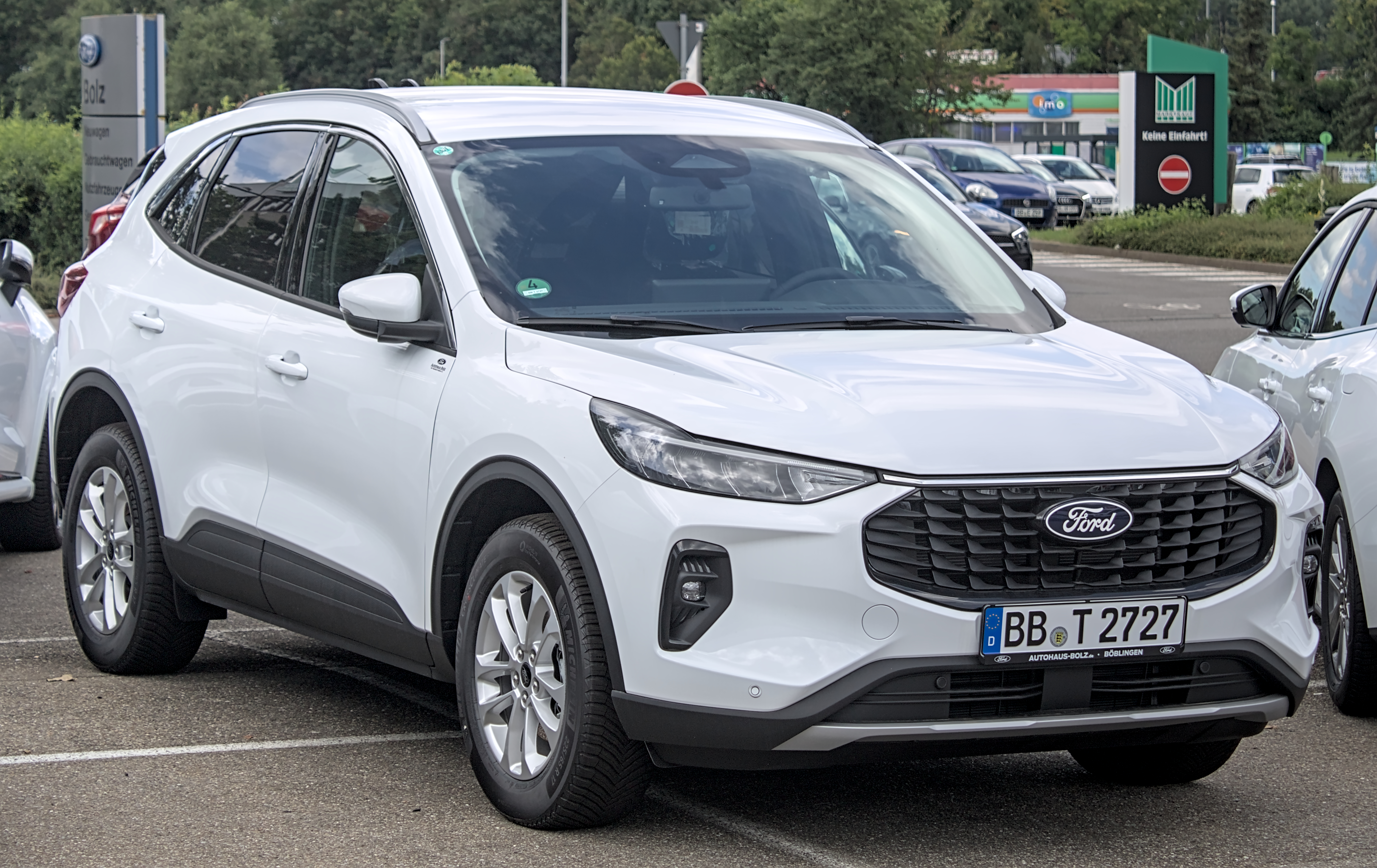
2024 facelift Kuga (front)

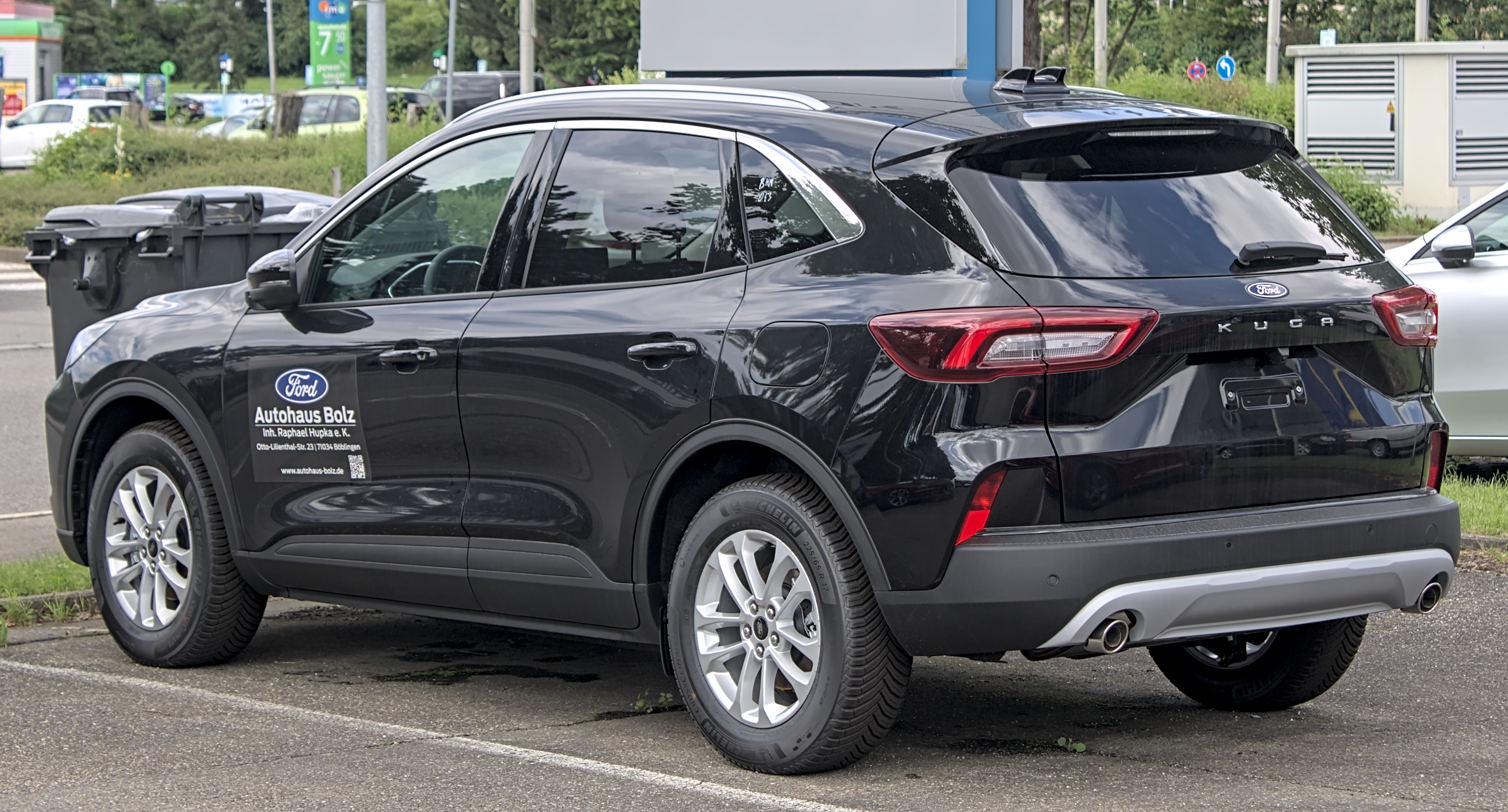
2024 facelift Kuga (rear)

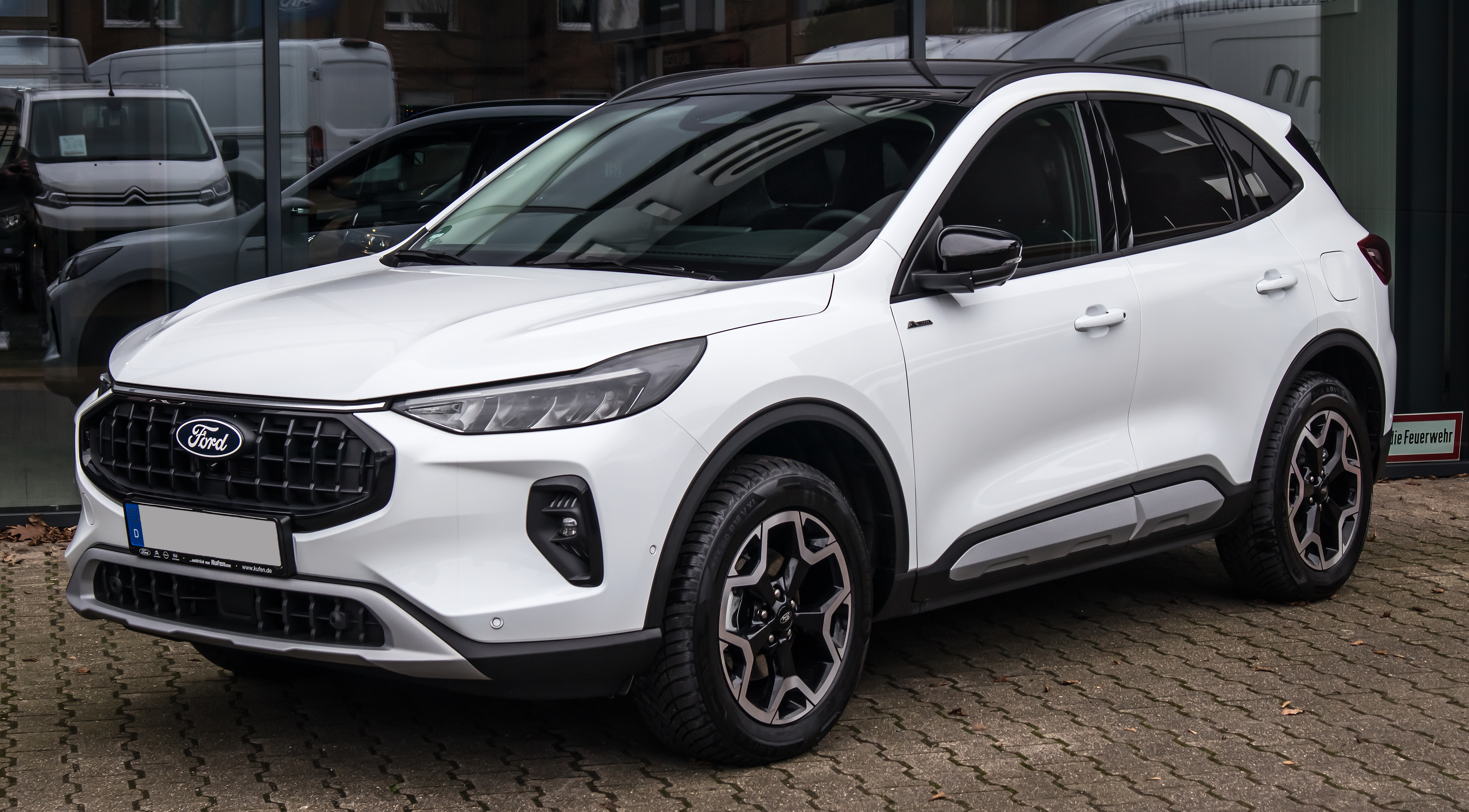
2024 facelift Kuga Active (front)

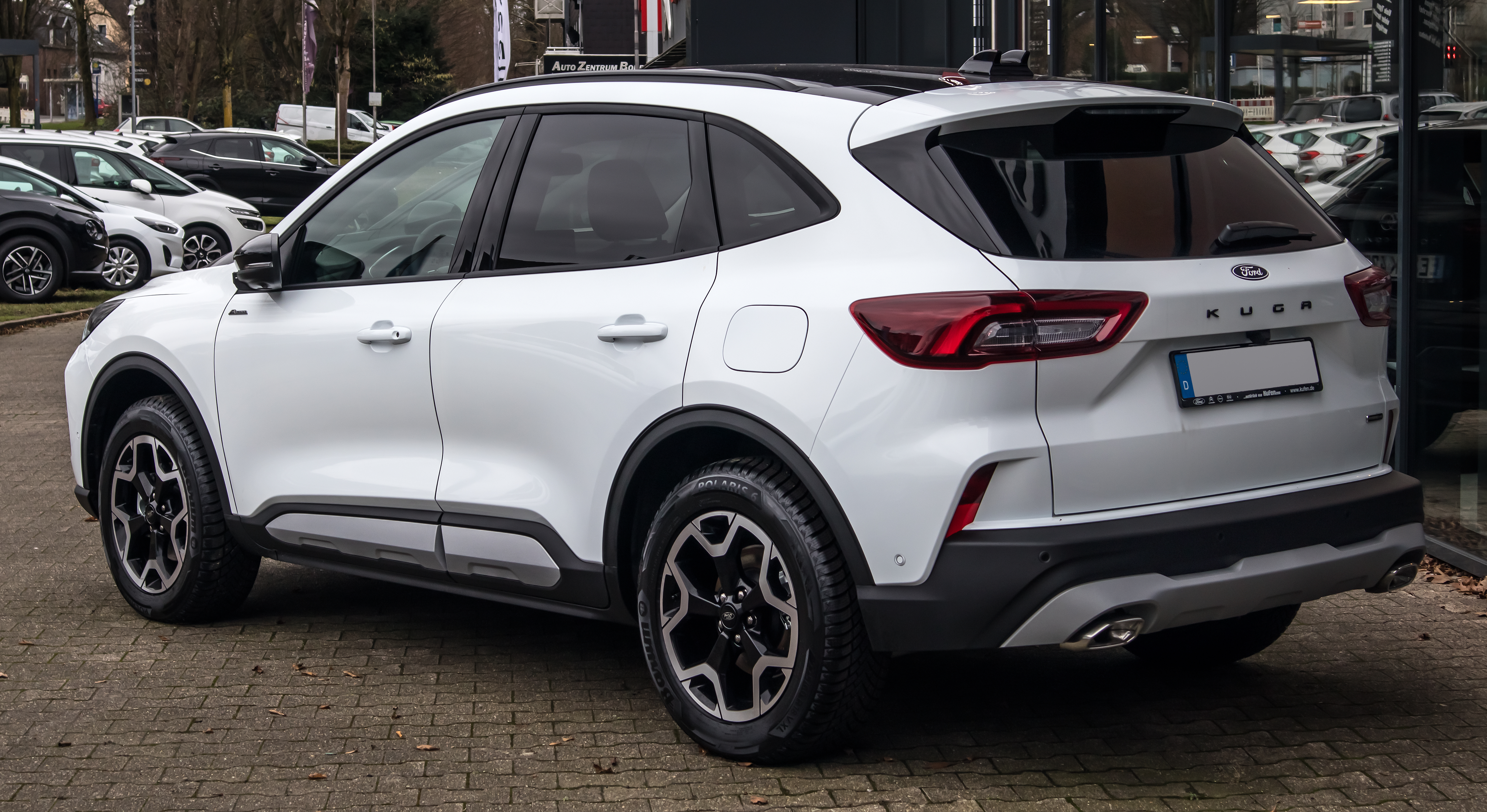
2024 facelift Kuga Active (rear)

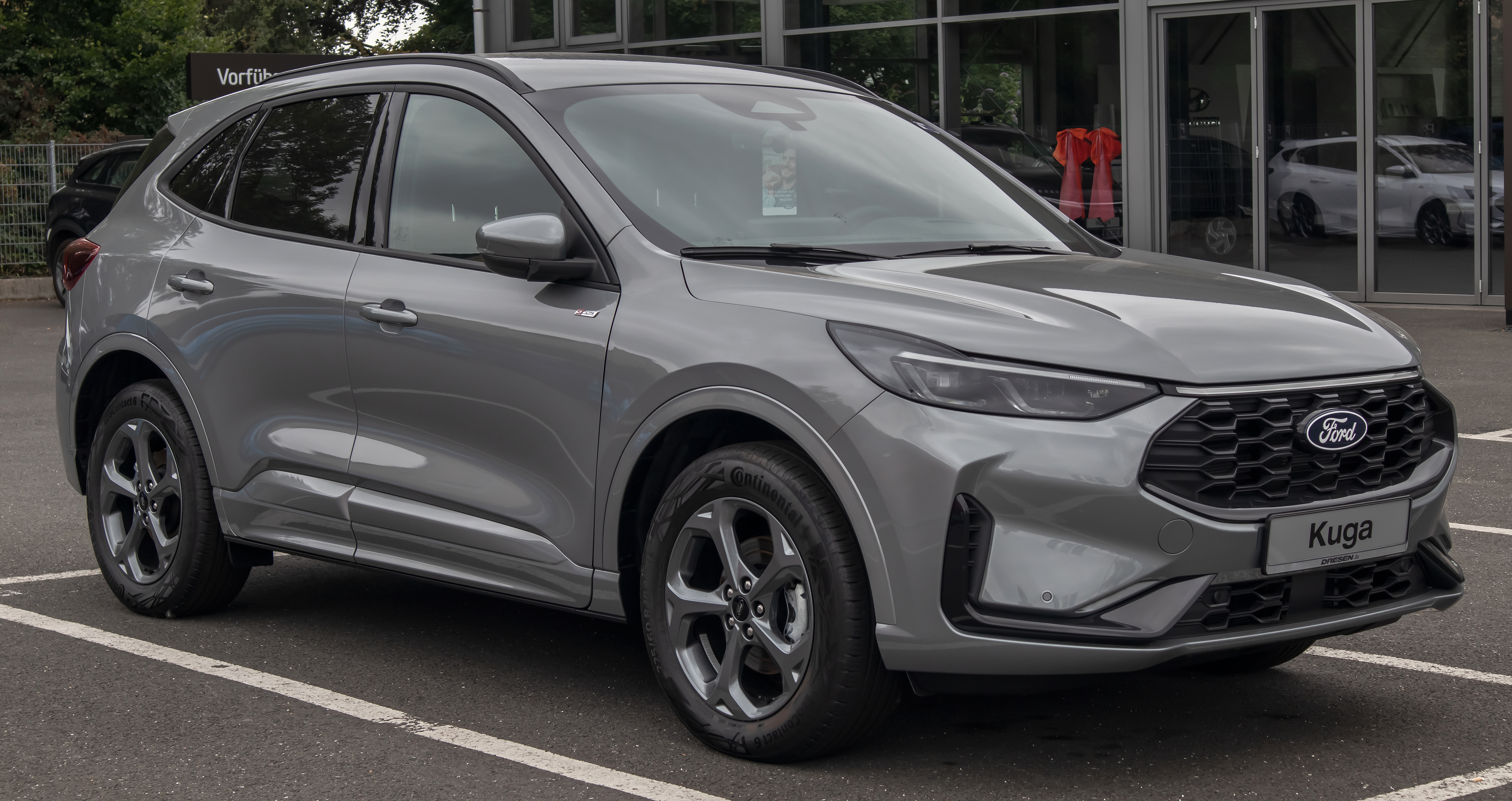
2024 facelift Kuga ST-Line (front)

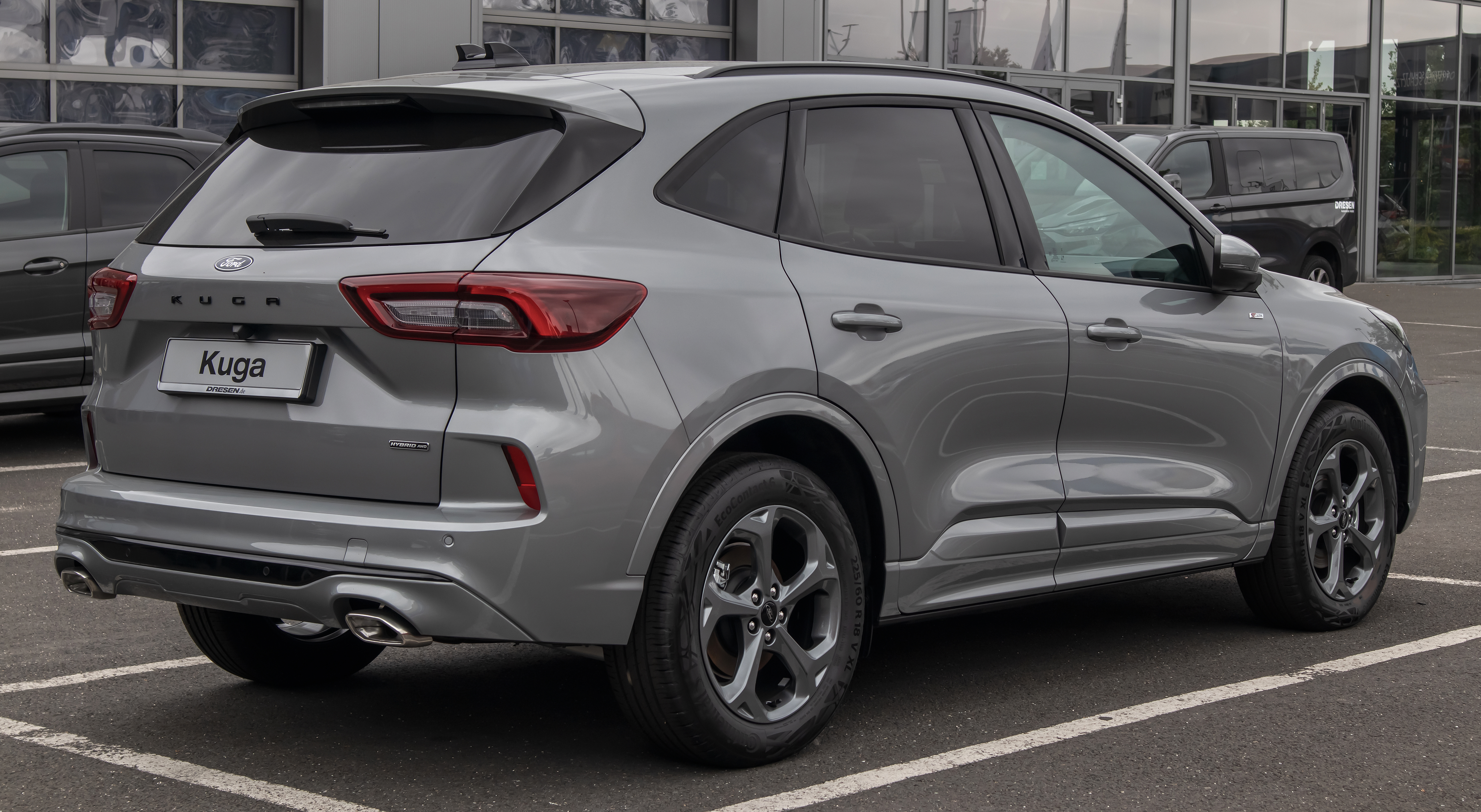
2024 facelift Kuga ST-Line (rear)

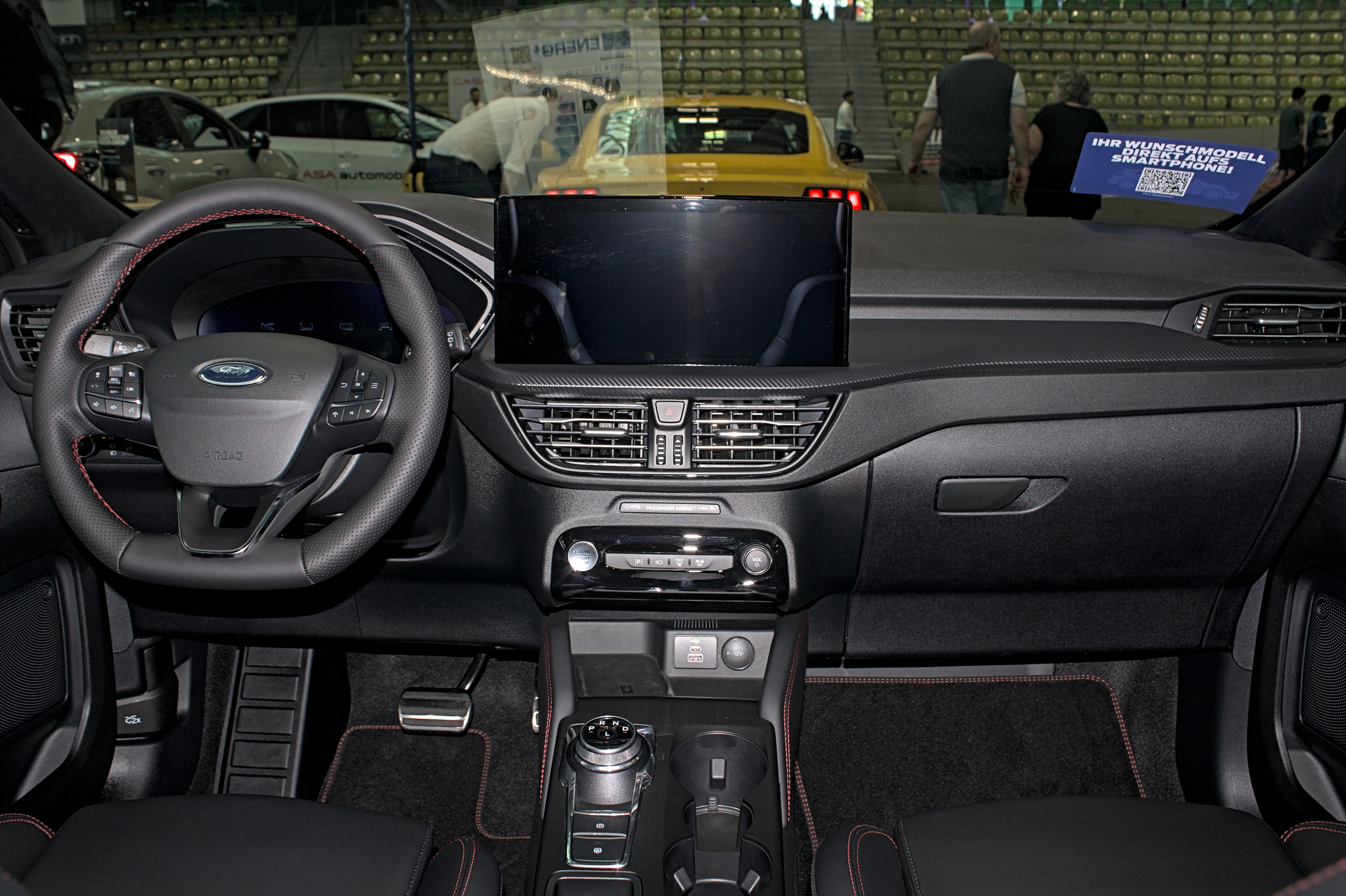
Interior (ST-Line X)

=== Safety ===
Euro NCAP test results Ford Kuga 2.0 diesel 4x4 automatic (LHD) (2019)
Test	Points	%
Overall:	5 /5 stars	
Adult occupant:	35.2	92%
Child occupant:	42.6	86%
Pedestrian:	39.6	82%
Safety assist:	9.5	73%

TNCAP test results Ford Kuga EcoBoost 180 'Value X' (2023, adapted from Euro NCAP 2017)
Test	Points	%
Overall:	3 /5 stars	
Adult occupant:	33.208	87%
Child occupant:	24	48%
Pedestrian:	32.301	76%
Safety assist:	6.957	57%

== Sales ==
The plug-in hybrid Kuga was Europe's best-selling plug-in hybrid in 2021, 2022, 2023, and it was Europe's second-best-selling plug-in hybrid in 2024. The non-PHEV version of the Kuga consistently ranks in the thirty most popular vehicles in Europe.

Year	Europe	China	Taiwan
2008	26,761		
2009	64,773		
2010	72,878		
2011	68,604		
2012	62,951		
2013	64,767	95,891	
2014	86,445	135,998	5,187
2015	102,464	135,194	6,634
2016	119,433	115,083	5,950
2017	151,451	92,455	7,502
2018	153,259	31,149	5,551
2019	161,635	8,898	4,558
2020	80,177	10,905	12,132
2021	107,966	3,506	13,312
2022	127,266		9,914
2023	123,268		6,722
2024			5,253

Chinese sales do not include the third-generation Kuga, which is sold as the Escape.
