= Louisville Assembly Plant =

Ford vehicle manufacturing plant in Louisville, Kentucky

Coordinates: 38.158587°N 85.718937°W

- Operated: 1955–present
- Location: 2000 Fern Valley Road; Louisville, Kentucky, United States
- Industry: Automotive
- Products: SUVs and pickup trucks
- Employees: 4,500
- Area: 180 acres (0.73 km^{2})
- Volume: 3,150,000 square feet (293,000 m^{2})
- Owner: Ford Motor Company

The Louisville Assembly Plant is an automobile manufacturing plant owned by Ford Motor Company in Louisville, Kentucky. Opened in 1955, the 3,154,173-square-foot (293,032.3 m^{2}) plant on 180 acres currently employs a total of 4,554 people. It is located adjacent to the Louisville International Airport on the south side of the city. Ford also operates another plant in Louisville, Kentucky Truck Assembly. The plant houses approximately 20.1 miles (32.3 km) of conveyor belts.

== History ==
Ford Motor Company began manufacturing Model T cars in Louisville in 1913, at 931 South Third Street. A new four story assembly plant at Third & Eastern Parkway opened in 1916. In 1925 Ford moved production to a new, one level assembly plant on Southwestern Parkway, on the Ohio River. The current plant on Fern Valley Road opened in 1955. Most Edsel automobiles (around 67%) were produced here in 1957–1959. Other models produced included Sunliners, Fairlanes & Galaxies. Louisville Assembly also produced heavy trucks as well as full-size cars on a separate assembly line. Heavy truck production ceased when the Kentucky Truck Plant opened on Chamberlain Lane in 1969. The factory continued with passenger car production that was augmented in 1973 with the addition of F-Series light trucks. F-Series/LTD passenger car production continued until 1981 when the plant was shut down for retooling for the new compact pickup, the Ranger, and its SUV cousin, the Bronco II. Production began in January 1982. Ford produced its two millionth Ranger/Bronco II at the plant on April 26, 1988. On February 14, 1990, Ford began producing the Explorer SUV in Louisville after investing $563 million at the plant. It produced one million Explorers as of August 27, 1993. Production of the similar Mercury Mountaineer began in April 1996, and Ranger production gave way in April 1999 to the Ford Explorer Sport Trac.

Production of the Explorer and Mountaineer ended in December 2010. The Explorer moved to Ford's Chicago Assembly plant, and the Mountaineer was discontinued with the demise of the Mercury brand. On April 4, 2012, Louisville Assembly began producing the Ford Escape, which was previously housed at Kansas City Assembly, and on August 25, 2014, the Lincoln MKC. In 2019, production of the new Lincoln Corsair (MKC replacement) began.

Production of the Lincoln Corsair, along the Ford Escape, has concluded in December 2025 make way for a midsize all-electric pickup, which is slated to enter production in 2027.

In August 2025, Ford Motor Company CEO Jim Farley announced a nearly $2 billion investment to transform the Louisville Assembly Plant into a cutting-edge electric vehicle (EV) manufacturing hub. Ford executives described the initiative as a "Model T moment" for the company's EV business, a bold leap toward making electric vehicles more affordable, efficient, and American-made.

Ford broke off development of the Universal Electric Vehicle (UEV) platform from its traditional product development business to pair "the speed of a startup with the expertise and scale of a 122-year-old automaker." A 350-person team in California is responsible for its design.

The new Ford Universal EV Platform is slated for completion by Q2 2027. The first UEV platform vehicle is the Ford Fathom.

== Products made ==
=== Past (model years) ===
- Ford LTD (1967–1981)
- Ford F-Series (1973–1982)
- Ford Ranger (1983–1999)
- Ford Bronco II (1984–1990)
- Ford Explorer (1991–2010)
- Ford Escape (2013–2025)
- Mazda Navajo (1991–1994)
- Mercury Mountaineer (1997–2010)
- Ford Explorer Sport Trac (2001–2010)
- Lincoln MKC (2015–2019)
- Lincoln Corsair (2020–2025)

== See also ==
- List of major employers in Louisville, Kentucky
