= Ford Sunliner =

Ford used the Sunliner name on many of its full-sized convertibles through the 1950s and 1960s.

- 1952–1954 Ford Crestline Sunliner
- 1955–1956 Ford Fairlane Sunliner
- 1957–1959 Ford Fairlane Sunliner
- 1959 Ford Galaxie Sunliner
- 1960–1964 Ford Galaxie Sunliner
