= Ford Fathom =

Battery electric compact pickup truck

Overview
- Manufacturer: Ford
- Model code: P833
- Production: 2027 (to commence)
- Model years: 2027
- Assembly: United States: Louisville, Kentucky (Louisville Assembly Plant)

Body and chassis
- Class: Compact pickup truck
- Body style: 4-door pickup truck
- Layout: Rear-motor, rear-wheel-drive; Dual-motor, all-wheel-drive
- Platform: Universal Electric Vehicle

Powertrain
- Electric motor: Permanent magnet motor (rear); Induction motor (front)
- Battery: 51 kWh CATL-Ford LFP
- Range: Up to 300 mi (483 km)

The Ford Fathom is an upcoming battery electric compact pickup truck to be built by the Ford Motor Company.

== Overview ==
The Fathom, which was rumored to be called the "Ranchero" before its official announcement, is expected to be about the same size as the Ford Maverick pickup truck.

The Fathom name and its starting price were announced on August 6, 2026. The Fathom will have a starting price of US$28,350, plus destination and delivery charges of $1,595, for a total of $29,945, making the Fathom the least expensive electric vehicle that Ford sells. Production and preorders will begin in the first quarter of 2027, and deliveries will start later that year.

The Fathom is the first vehicle that will use Ford's new Universal Electric Vehicle (UEV) platform. Ford CEO Jim Farley said in August 2025 that the UEV platform is Ford's "Model T moment", noting that the $30,000 target price for the new truck was roughly the same as that of a Ford Model T, adjusted for inflation. To support production of the Fathom, the company intended to invest about $5 billion in the Louisville Assembly Plant in Kentucky and BlueOval Battery Park in Michigan.

=== Design ===
The Fathom maintains the appearance of a crew cab pickup truck. Prototypes of the Fathom were shown to have conventional pickup features, such as a conventional hood and upright cab, however the front end is considered to be more aerodynamic due to thick, black camouflage at the front of the Fathom prototypes and the back of the cab. Illustrations by Ford show the Fathom will use a sloping hood.

Renderings from TopElectricSUV based on prototypes show it is expected to use vertical headlights, with them being accompanied by daytime running lights. The A-pillar will be pushed back farther to maximize aerodynamic gains.

=== Features ===
Regardless of trim level, all Fathom models will come with BlueCruise hands-free driving, bidirectional power, Apple CarPlay and Android Auto, and a digital key. The center console is reported to be shared with the Maverick. The Fathom will also have Apple Maps embedded for built-in navigation.

== Powertrain and chassis ==
The Fathom comes standard with a rear-motor, rear-wheel-drive setup and a lithium iron phosphate battery, with a dual-motor, all-wheel-drive setup being optional. Based on a statement from Ford, the Fathom's standard battery size is estimated to be around 51 kWh, as Ford stated that it is aiming for a battery capacity roughly 15% smaller than that of the BYD Atto 3, which has a usable battery size of 60.5 kWh. The battery used in the Fathom will also be roughly half in size of the Ford F-150 Lightning's battery. All-wheel-drive models will get a range of up to 300 miles (483 km) with a larger battery and is likely to have a different battery chemistry than that of the rear-wheel-drive model. The battery cells for the rear-wheel-drive models will use technology licensed from CATL.

The chassis is made of only 3 parts: A front casting, battery pack, and rear casting. This is the result of Ford using large castings, known as unicastings by Ford, as part of a drive to cut costs and lower the weight of the Fathom.

Based on images of the Fathom's chassis, MacPherson struts will be used for the front suspension.
