= Ford Mustang Mach-E =

Battery electric compact crossover SUV

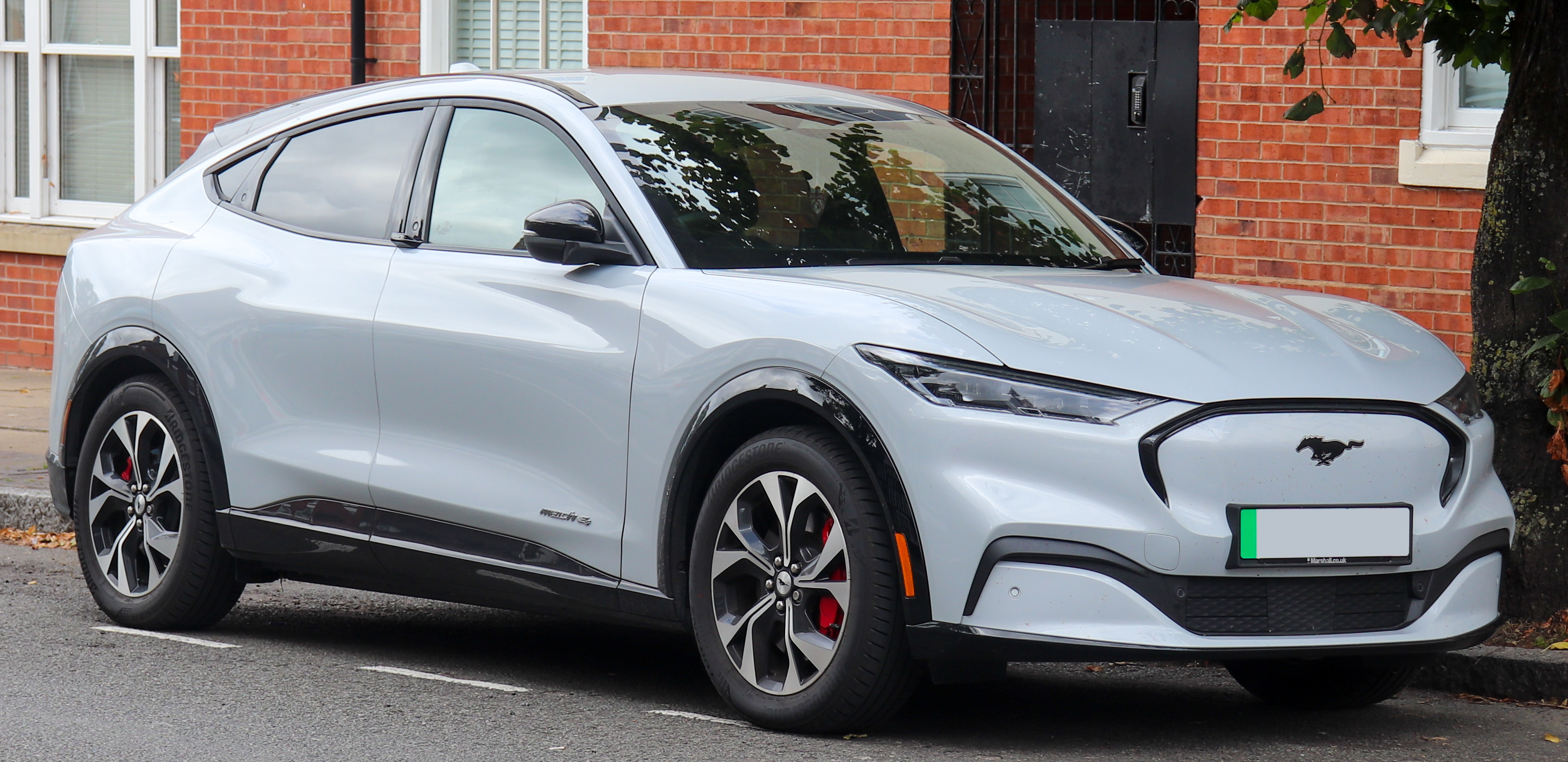

Overview
- Manufacturer: Ford
- Model code: CX727
- Production: 2020–present
- Model years: 2021–present
- Assembly: Mexico: Cuautitlán Izcalli (Cuautitlán Assembly); China: Chongqing (Changan Ford, 2021–2025)
- Designer: Jason Castriota (chief designer); Chris Walter (exterior design manager); Josh Greiner (interior designer)

Body and chassis
- Class: Compact crossover SUV
- Body style: 5-door coupe SUV
- Layout: Rear-motor, rear-wheel drive; Dual-motor, all-wheel-drive
- Platform: Ford GE1

Powertrain
- Electric motor: Permanent magnet synchronous motor
- Power output: 198–358 kW (266–480 hp; 269–487 PS)
- Battery: 75.7 kWh NMC LGES; 78 kWh LFP CATL; 98.8 kWh NMC LGES
- Electric range: 211–320 mi (340–515 km) (EPA); 400–610 km (249–379 mi) (WLTP)
- Plug-in charging: AC: 11 kW; DC: 115–150 kW

Dimensions
- Wheelbase: 2,984 mm (117.5 in)
- Length: 4,739 mm (186.6 in)
- Width: 1,881 mm (74.1 in)
- Height: 1,621 mm (63.8 in)
- Curb weight: 4,394–4,890 lb (1,993–2,218 kg)

The Ford Mustang Mach-E is a battery electric compact crossover SUV produced by Ford. Introduced on November 17, 2019, it went on sale in December 2020 as a 2021 model. The Mach-E is part of the Mustang series, with its name inspired by the Mach 1 variant of the first-generation Mustang. The car won the 2021 North American SUV of the Year Award.

== Overview ==
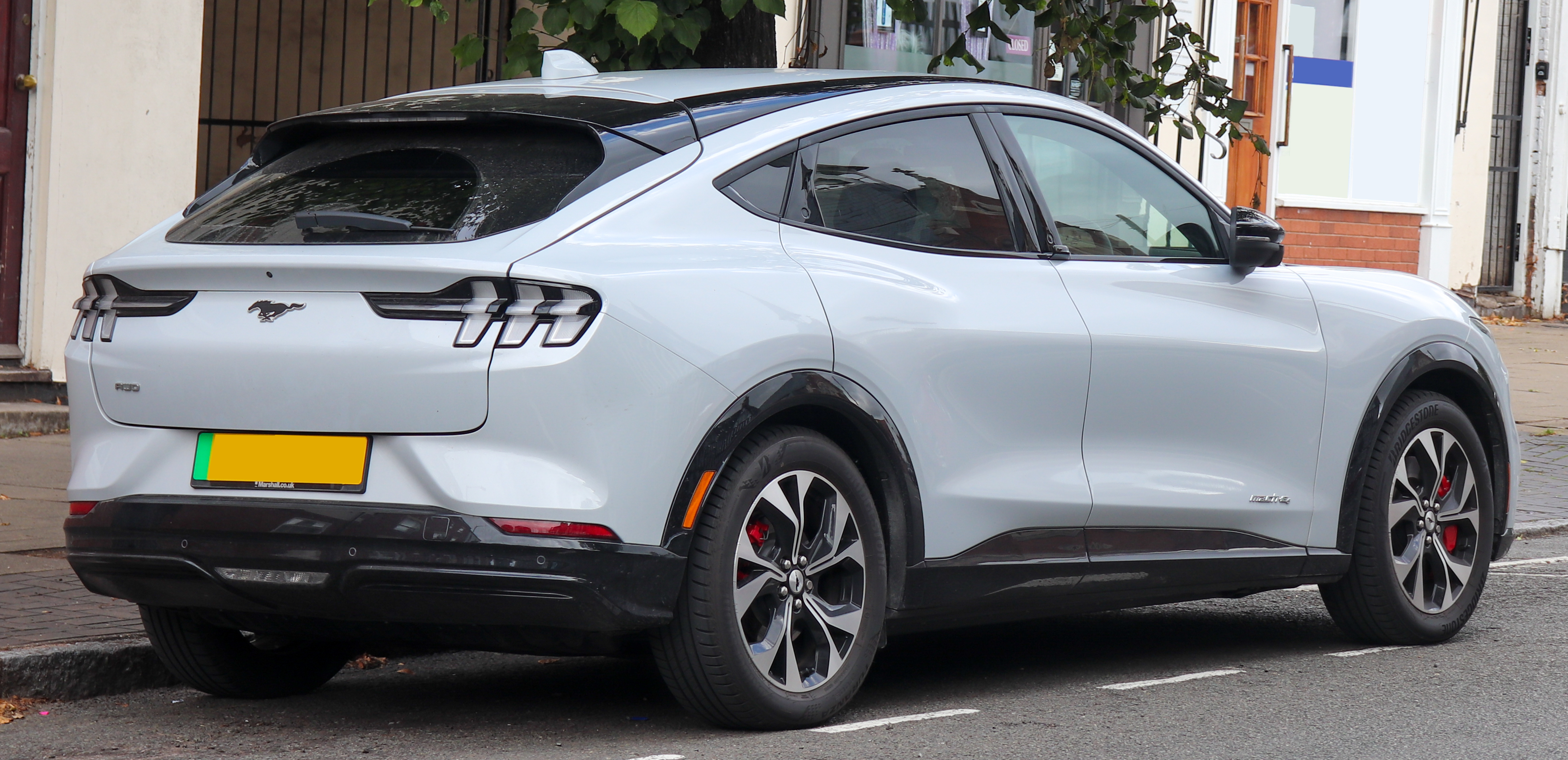
Rear view

During development, the Mustang Mach-E was originally teased as the Ford Mach 1, but was retracted after strong public opposition, with Ford CEO Jim Farley describing the name tease as an evaluation.

The Mach-E has buttons that open the doors, and a small fixed door handle protruding from the front doors, instead of door handles. Smartphones, or a keypad built into the B-pillar, can be used as a door key.

The interior has a wide dashboard and built-in soundbar; the dash is equipped with a vertically mounted 15.5 in (394 mm) touchscreen infotainment system fitted with a rotary dial. The majority of the car's systems are controlled through the screen, which uses Ford's recent SYNC 4 operating system, updatable wirelessly. There is a 10.2 in (260 mm) digital cluster for the driver, and the steering wheel has several physical buttons.

The Mustang Mach-E uses the Global Electrified 1 (GE1) platform, which is a heavily reworked version of the C2 platform shared with the fourth generation Focus and third generation Kuga/fourth generation Escape. It offers a traditional cargo area at the rear offering a volume of 29 cu ft (821 L), and a 4.8 cu ft (136 L) waterproof trunk under the hood and can be charged by a home AC charger or by DC fast chargers at up to 150 kW.

== Trim levels ==
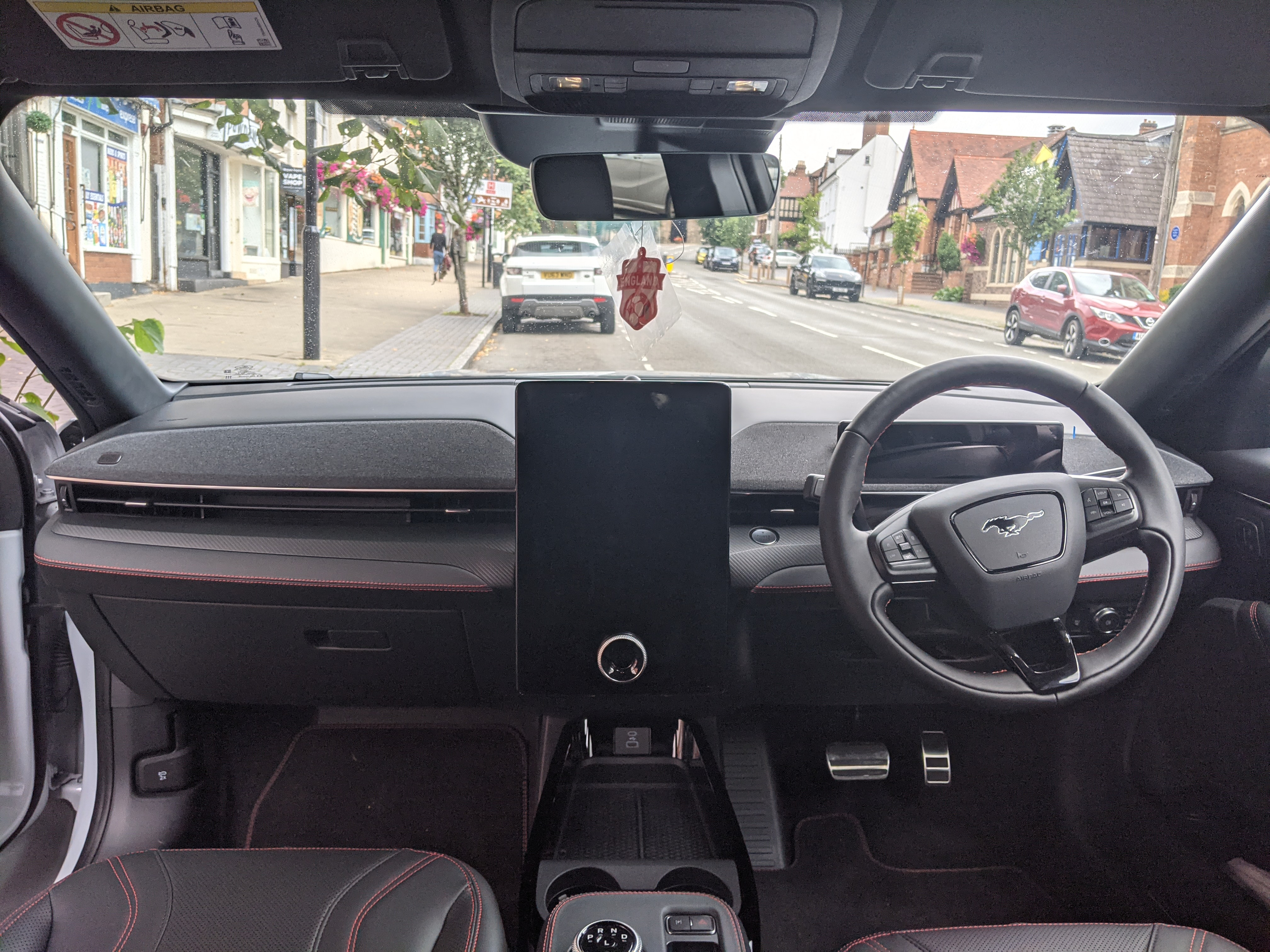
Interior

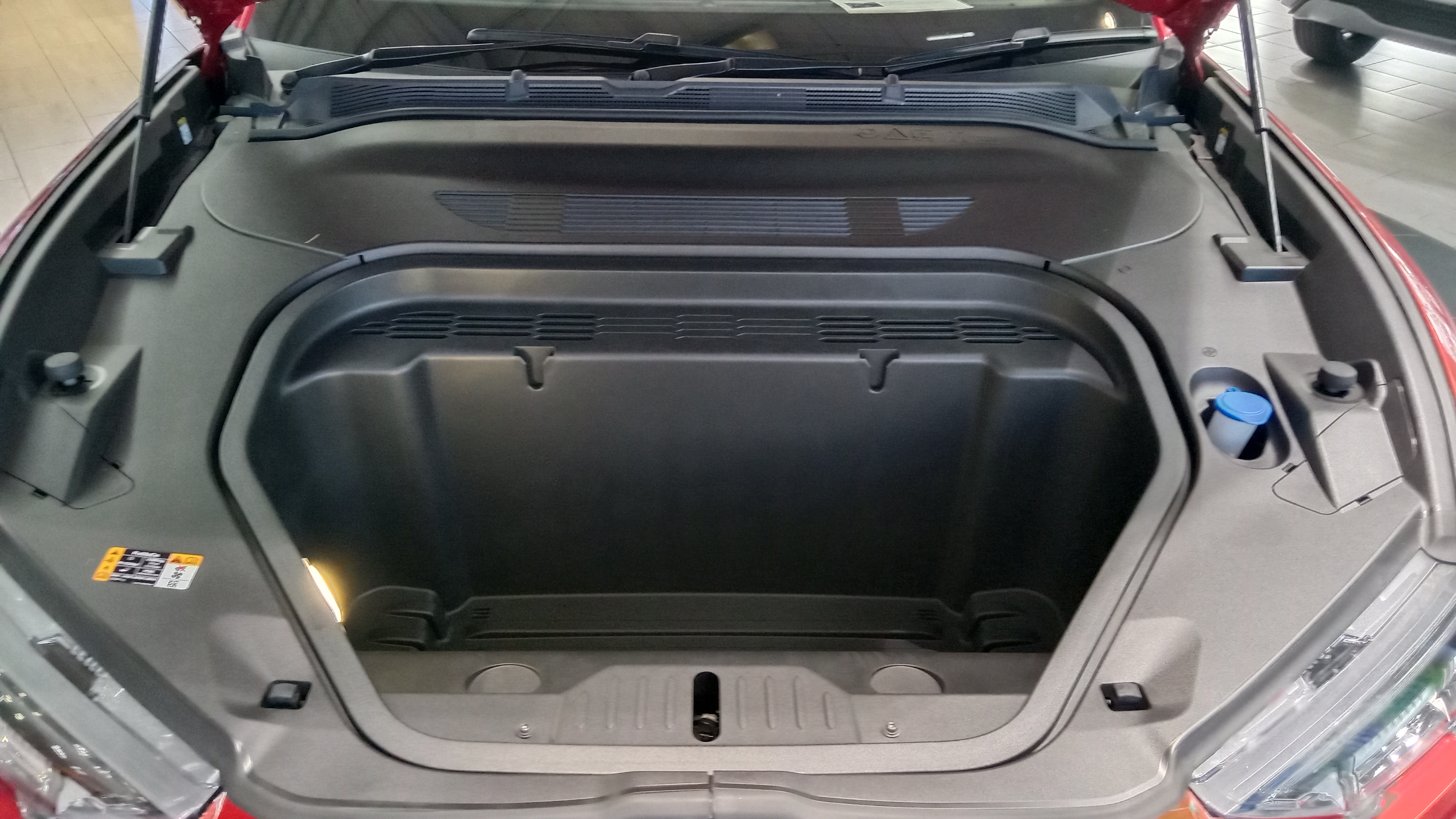
Front trunk (Frunk)

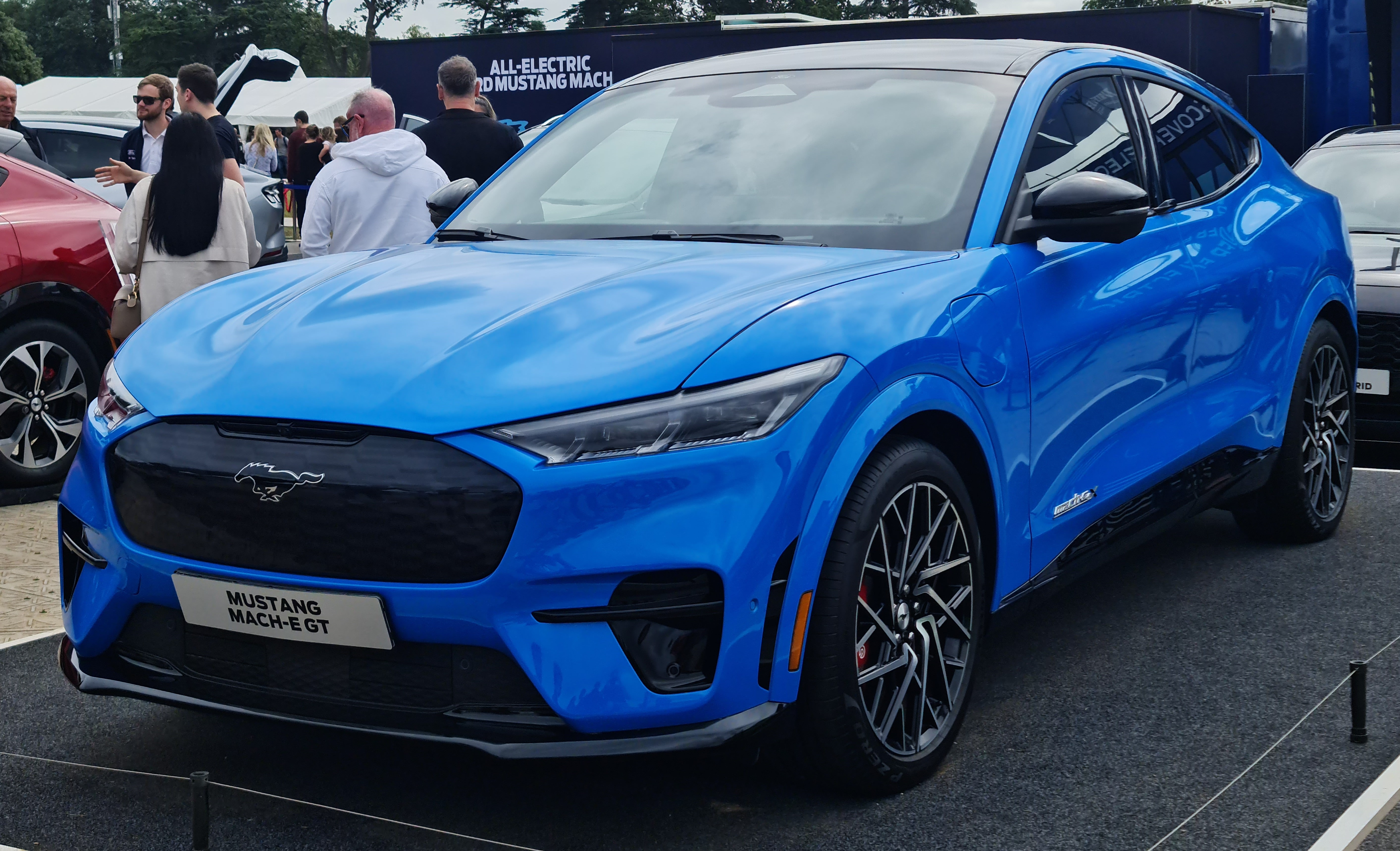
Mustang Mach-E GT Performance Edition

In the U.S., the Mustang Mach-E is available in four distinct trim levels: base Select, mid-level California Route 1 Edition, well-equipped Premium, and performance-oriented GT. A limited-production First Edition trim was also available at launch for the 2021 model year, and was based on the Premium trim. A GT Performance Package is also available for the GT trim.

The model was launched with two battery pack sizes and three power outputs. The entry-level rear-wheel drive version is offered with either a 75.7 kWh (68 kWh usable) battery pack driving a 266 hp (198 kW; 270 PS) motor or an 98.8 kWh (88 kWh usable) extended battery pack driving a 290 hp (216 kW; 294 PS) motor. Both battery packs have a claimed 0–60 mph (0–97 km/h) time of 6.1 seconds or less and an EPA range of around 230 and 300 miles (370 and 480 km) respectively. The SR (Standard Range) and ER (Extended Range) models use the motors, but motor output differs due to the pack's differing power output limits. All models use a 210 kW (282 hp; 286 PS) rear motor, while eAWD models (Select and Premium) use an additional smaller 50 kW (67 hp; 68 PS) motor on the front axle. The GT Performance trim uses the same 210 kW (282 hp; 286 PS) motor in both front and rear.

A dual-motor all-wheel-drive version is also offered with either the same 75.7 kWh battery pack driving a 266 hp (198 kW; 270 PS) motor, or the 98.8 kWh extended battery pack driving a 346 hp (258 kW; 351 PS) motor. They have estimated EPA ranges of 211 and 270 miles (340 and 435 km), respectively. Testing by Edmunds Automotive indicated an actual range of 304 miles (489 km) with the extended-range battery pack version; they said that "Every Tesla we've tested has failed to hit its EPA range estimate". Car and Driver achieved a 0–60 mph (0–97 km/h) time of 5.1 seconds with the extended-range model.

An all-wheel-drive GT trim is offered with the 98.8 kWh pack, producing 480 hp (358 kW; 487 PS), a targeted 0–60 mph (0–97 km/h) time of 3.8 seconds, and a targeted driving range of 250 miles (400 km). Edmunds's testing found that the Mach-E GT's peak acceleration is curtailed after 5 seconds of hard acceleration; Ford confirmed this. The GT trim's Unbridled Extend Mode attempts to ameliorate this limitation by increasing cooling and limiting peak motor output.

The Mach-E GT Performance Edition was revealed on December 2, 2020. It is equipped with 20" alloy wheels with Pirelli tires, red Brembo calipers, and black accents on the bodywork. It is equipped with a 480 hp (358 kW; 487 PS) motor that can generate 634 lb⋅ft (860 N⋅m) of torque, and has a range of 235 miles (378 km).

== Specifications ==
=== 2020–22 models ===
In a 2026 study of approximately 36,000 Ford Mustang Mach-E vehicles from the 2021 model year, Ford reported that the vehicles retained an average of 92% of their original usable battery capacity after approximately five years of use.

Specifications
Battery	Standard Range				Extended Range					
Powertrain	RWD		AWD		RWD		AWD			
Model	Select	Premium	Select	Premium	Premium	California Route 1 AWD	Premium	First Edition	GT	GT Performance Edition
Availability	Late 2020							Late 2020 (limited quantity)	Q3 2021	
Battery Capacity	75.7 kWh (68 kWh usable)				98.8 kWh (88 kWh usable)					
Range (EPA)	230 mi (370 km)		211 mi (340 km)		300 mi (483 km)		270 mi (435 km)		270 mi (435 km)	260 mi (418 km)
Range (WLTP)	440 km (273 mi)		400 km (249 mi)		610 km (379 mi)		540 km (336 mi)		500 km (311 mi)	
0–60 mph (97 km/h) time	5.8s		5.2s		6.1s		4.8s		3.8s	3.5s
Power Output	266 hp (270 PS; 198 kW)				290 hp (294 PS; 216 kW)		346 hp (351 PS; 258 kW)		480 hp (487 PS; 358 kW)	
Peak Torque	317 lb⋅ft (430 N⋅m)		428 lb⋅ft (580 N⋅m)		317 lb⋅ft (430 N⋅m)		428 lb⋅ft (580 N⋅m)		600 lb⋅ft (813 N⋅m)	634 lb⋅ft (860 N⋅m)
Top Speed	180 km/h (112 mph)								200 km/h (124 mph)	
DC Fast Charge (DCFC) Speed	Up to 115 kW (Select); Up to 150 kW (Premium)				Up to 150 kW					
Cargo Space	64.4 cu ft (1,820 L) max volume with rear seats folded, rear trunk, and front trunk ("frunk"). (59.6 cu ft (1,690 L) including rear trunk + 4.8 cu ft (140 L) frunk)									

=== 2023 models and charging standards change ===
For the 2023 model year, Ford began offering LFP battery chemistry in the Mach-E and updated battery pack gross capacities. In May 2023, Ford announced integration of the North American Charging System (NACS) DC fast charging system into their electric vehicles. Existing Ford electric models will be able to connect to the NACS system and its chargers by use of an adapter. Both will thus have access to the extensive NACS charging network with more than 12,000 chargers worldwide.

Ford EVs will eventually have native a NACS charge ports on the vehicle, but as of the 2025 model year Ford still sells the Mach-E with a native CCS1 port in the US market and offers a NACS to CCS1 adapter as an option on 2025 models. It is available to purchase through Ford Dealers for $200 if a vehicle was not optioned with it from the factory.

=== 2024–present models ===
In 2024 Ford dropped the California Route One model from the Mach-E lineup and added the Rally model above the GT model. In 2025 Ford also began offering the Sport Appearance Package on the Premium trim level which gave the Premium trim level the front grille and bumper design that was previously only available on the GT model.

Battery	Standard Range				Extended Range				
Powertrain	RWD		AWD		RWD	AWD			
Model	Select	Premium	Select	Premium	Premium	Select	Premium	GT	Rally
Battery Capacity	75.7-78 kWh (70–72.6 kWh usable)				98.8 kWh (88 kWh usable)			98.8 kWh (91 kWh)	
Range (EPA)	260 mi (418 km)		240 mi (386 km)		320 mi (515 km)	300 mi (483 km)		280 mi (451 km)	265 mi (426 km)
Range (WLTP)	470 km (292 mi)		435 km (270 mi)		600 km (373 mi)	550 km (342 mi)		515 km (320 mi)	510 km (317 mi)
0–60 mph (97 km/h) time	5.6s		5.2s		5.4s	4.8s		3.8s	3.4s
Power Output	264 hp (268 PS; 197 kW)		325 hp (330 PS; 242 kW)		272 hp (276 PS; 203 kW)	370 hp (375 PS; 276 kW)		480 hp (487 PS; 358 kW)	
Peak Torque	387 lb⋅ft (525 N⋅m)		500 lb⋅ft (678 N⋅m)		387 lb⋅ft (525 N⋅m)	500 lb⋅ft (678 N⋅m)		600 lb⋅ft (813 N⋅m); 700 lb⋅ft (949 N⋅m) (Performance Edition)	700 lb⋅ft (949 N⋅m)
Top Speed	180 km/h (112 mph)							200 km/h (124 mph)	
DC Fast Charge (DCFC) Speed	Up to 150 kW								
Cargo Space	('23-24) 56.5 cu ft (1,600 L) max volume with rear seats folded, rear trunk and front trunk(frunk). (59.6 cu ft (1,690 L) including rear trunk + 4.8 cu ft (140 L) frunk) (Frunk size not stated for 2025, but was heavily reduced to provide space for Vapor Injection Heat pump introduced for 2025 & 2026 model)								
Cargo Space	('25) 56.7 cu ft (1,610 L) max volume with rear seats folded, rear trunk.								

== Special variants ==
=== Mustang Mach-E 1400 ===
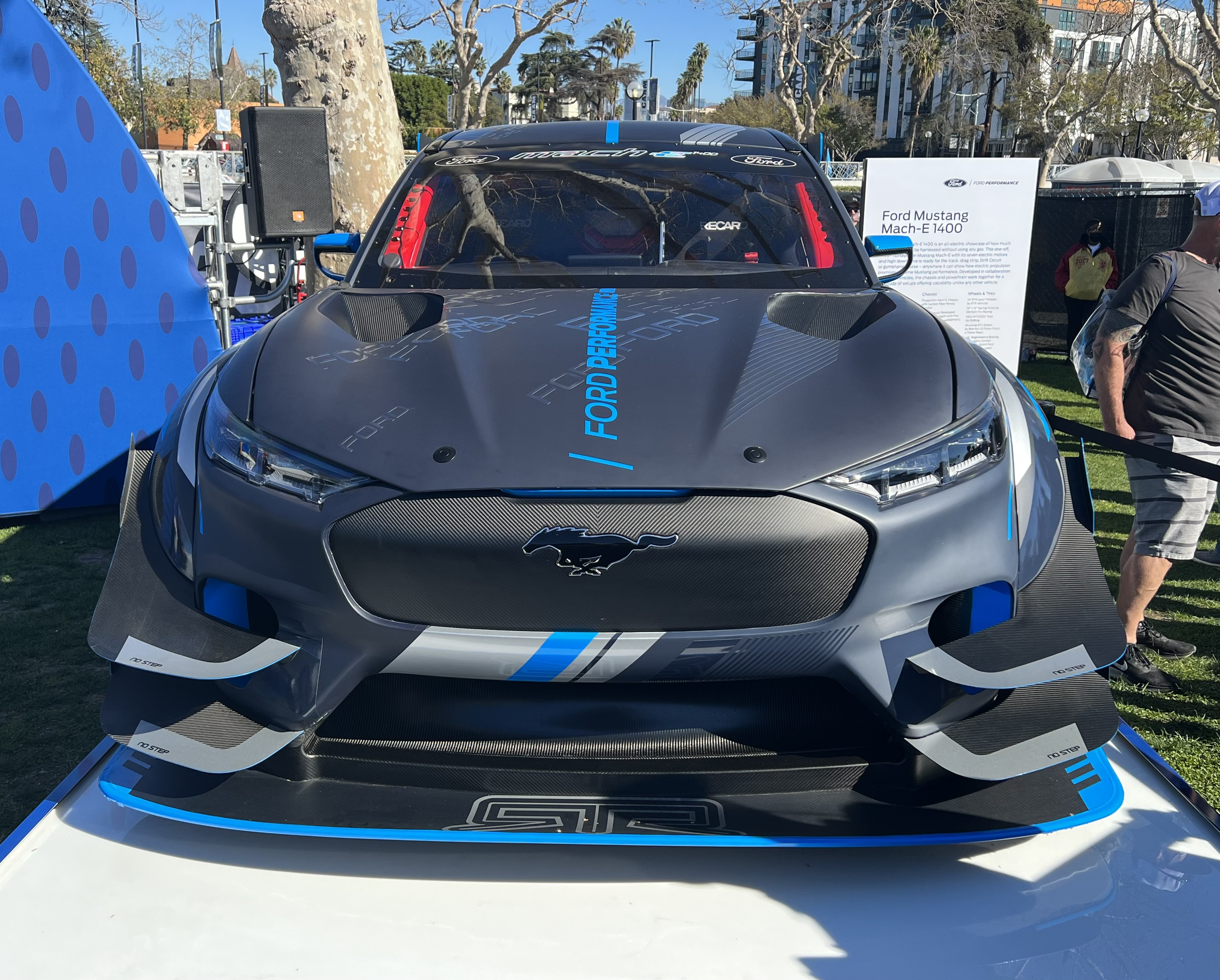
A Ford Mustang Mach-E 1400 on display at the L.A. Coliseum.

The Ford Mustang Mach-E 1400 is a test-bed prototype, first tested by Vaughn Gittin Jr., developed in over 10,000 hours of collaboration between RTR Vehicles and Ford Performance. It is made mostly from composite fiber, saving more weight over carbon fiber. Based on the performance figures of the upcoming Ford Mustang Mach-E GT, the power of the Mach-E 1400 has been increased to 1,400 hp (1,044 kW; 1,419 PS) and over 2,300 lbf⋅ft (3,118 N⋅m) of torque, powered by a total of 7 electric motors from a 56.8 kWh nickel-manganese-cobalt alloy battery, for high performance and discharge rate, cooled by a di-electric coolant. The power of each electric motor can be adjusted individually within very small margins, and could allow for switching between all-wheel drive, rear-wheel drive, and front-wheel drive.

The aerodynamics of the prototype allow it to get up to 2,600 lbf (12 kN) of downforce. Regenerative braking is achieved through an electric booster system, accompanied by ABS and stability control to optimize the braking system. The electric prototype uses Brembo brakes like the Ford Mustang GT4 racecar. The public debut occurred at the 2020 NHRA U.S. Nationals.

=== Super Mustang Mach-E ===
The Ford Super Mustang Mach-E is a performance-oriented EV demonstrator that was developed in collaboration with Ford Performance and STARD Advanced Research and Development with the purpose of participating in the annual automobile Pikes Peak International Hill Climb. Publicly unveiled on June 15th, 2025, the Super Mustang Mach-E superseded Ford Performance's F-150 Lightning SuperTruck entry of the previous year. Using three STARD UHP 6-Phase motors that produce a total of 1,400 hp (1,044 kW; 1,419 PS), it is supplied by Lithium-Polymer battery cells with a total capacity of 50 kWh and delivers 710 kW worth of electricity from regenerative braking. Similar to the aforementioned F-150 SuperTruck, the Super Mustang runs on a voltage of 799V, with the latter being approximately 260 lbs (117.9 kg) than the former. The Super Mustang Mach-E also utilizes carbon brakes alongside forged magnesium wheels. Paired with carbon fiber aerodynamic surfaces, the demonstrator produces up to 6,900 lbf (30.7 kN) of downforce when going at a speed of 150 mph (241.4 km/h).

On June 22nd, 2025, the Super Mustang Mach-E performed its maiden run at Pikes Peak, though weather conditions shortened the normal length of the course. Despite this, the Super Mustang Mach-E, driven by then five-time Pikes Peak winner Romain Dumas, finished the event in second place with a posted time of 3:42.252. The following year, Ford Racing and Dumas returned to compete in the 2026 Pikes Peak International Hill Climb. Without any weather constraints, the French driver completed a full, complete run of the course in the No. 125 Super Mustang Mach-E on June 21, 2026, reaching the top of the summit with a posted time of 8:18.202. This result won Dumas his sixth Pikes Peak victory and a second victory for Ford Racing.

=== Mustang Mach-E GT Service Vehicles ===
In December 2021, New York City announced it was buying 184 Mustang Mach-E SUVs as emergency vehicles. During 2022 these vehicles would replace gasoline-powered cars already in use. This model could accelerate from 0 to 60 mph (0 to 97 km/h) in 3.8 seconds and had a range of 270 miles (430 km).

=== Mustang Mach-E Rally ===
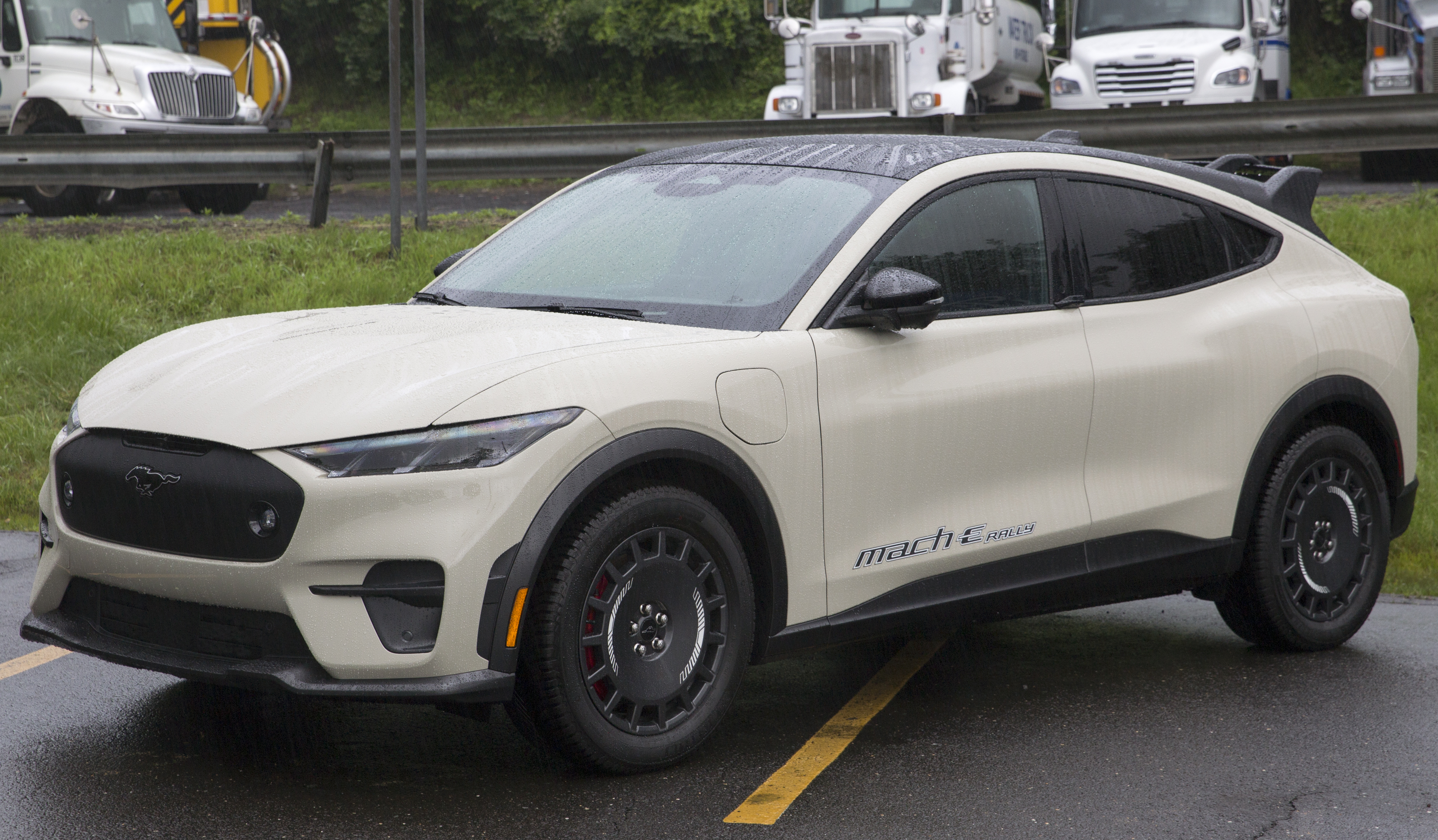
Ford Mustang Mach-E Rally (front view)

At the Goodwood Festival of Speed in July 2023, Ford unveiled the Rally concept car, which will be put in production. In September 2023, Ford introduced the production version of the Mustang Mach-E Rally, which has an electric motor on each axle with a total of 358 kW (480 hp).

== Marketing ==
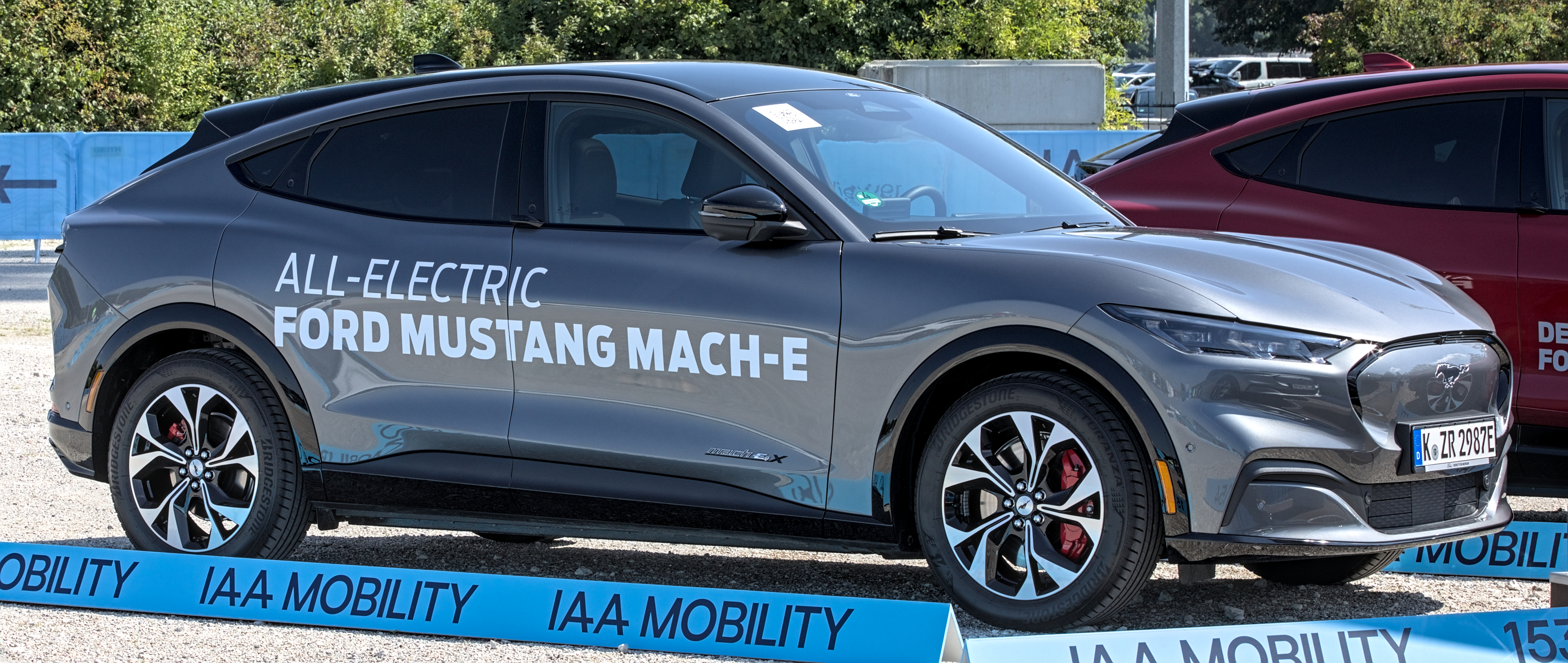
Ford Mustang Mach-E on display at IAA 2021.

Ford hired British actor Idris Elba (who once worked for Ford of Britain along with his father) to star in several teaser commercials for the car and host the Mustang Mach-E's official debut on November 17, 2019.

On July 9, 2021, Paul Clifton, Kevin Booker, and Fergal McGrath set a Guinness World Record by driving from John O'Groats to Land's End. They covered the 840 miles (1,350 km) route with three charges. Later, a team consisting of Booker, McGrath, and Adam Wood beat this record with one charge stop of 43 minutes 13 seconds, gaining an additional two Guinness World Records.

== Production ==
Unlike the internal combustion engine (ICE) Mustang models, the Mach-E is assembled at Cuautitlán Assembly in Cuautitlán Izcalli, Mexico. According to former Ford CEO Jim Hackett, assembling the vehicle in Mexico allows Ford to make a profit from the first vehicle, unlike other electric vehicles, adding that as Ford develops factory capacity for electric vehicle production in the United States, some production may be moved there.

In February 2021, Ford announced the vehicle would be produced in China by the Changan Ford joint venture for the Chinese domestic market in order to penetrate the nation's electric vehicle market. In 2025, Changan Ford ended production of the Chinese domestic market Ford Mustang Mach-E and as a result, the Mustang Mach-E was discontinued from the Chinese domestic market shortly after due to poor sales as it was unable to stay competitive against local electric vehicles made by domestic Chinese car brands/manufacturers (which were rivals to the Mustang Mach-E in China).

In April 2022, Ford stopped accepting new orders for the 2022 model year Mustang Mach-E due to its popularity.

In June 2022, the CFO of Ford Motor announced that the profitability of the Mustang Mach-E had been wiped out due to increases in the cost of raw materials.

== Significant recalls ==
In May 2022, Ford initiated a select recall for 2021 Mach-E AWD models over "an issue with unintended acceleration, deceleration, and/or a loss of power" resulting from functional safety software failing to detect a software error during operation leading to unintended acceleration, unintended deceleration, or a loss of drive power.

== Safety ==
The 2021 Mustang Mach-E top trim was awarded the "Top Safety Pick" by the Insurance Institute for Highway Safety.

IIHS scores
Small overlap front (Driver)	Good	
Small overlap front (Passenger)	Good	
Moderate overlap front	Good	
Side (original test)	Good	
Roof strength	Good	
Head restraints and seats	Good	
Headlights	Good / Marginal	varies by trim/option
Front crash prevention (Vehicle-to-Vehicle)	Superior	
Front crash prevention (Vehicle-to-Pedestrian, day)	Superior	
Front crash prevention (Vehicle-to-Pedestrian, night)	Superior	
Child seat anchors (LATCH) ease of use	Acceptable	

The National Highway Traffic Safety Administration opened an investigation after a crash where advanced driver assistance system was in use.

Euro NCAP test results Ford Mustang Mach-E, Titanium (LHD) (2021)
Test	Points	%
Overall:	5 /5 stars	
Adult occupant:	35.2	92%
Child occupant:	42.5	86%
Pedestrian:	37.3	69%
Safety assist:	13.2	82%

ANCAP test results Ford Mustang Mach-E all variants excluding GT (2021, aligned with Euro NCAP)
Test	Points	%
Overall:	5 /5 stars	
Adult occupant:	35.16	92%
Child occupant:	43.43	88%
Pedestrian:	37.32	69%
Safety assist:	13.14	82%

== Awards ==
In 2021, the Mustang Mach-E won Car and Driver's first "EV of the Year" award. It was up against ten other vehicles including three Tesla models, Audi e-tron, Volvo XC40 Recharge, and Porsche Taycan. All vehicles were tested on how far they could travel at 70 miles per hour (113 km/h), performance tests, subjective feel tests on public roads and finally a 1,000 miles (1,600 km) road trip from Michigan to Virginia and back. The magazine stated that: "The Mach-E has the driving dynamics and design to push new buyers past mere acceptance of EVs to excitement." They also made note of the premium materials and build quality in their scoring.

== Sales ==
Year	U.S.	Europe	Mexico	China	Canada
2020	3	185	—	—	6
2021	27,140	23,054	—	108	4,352
2022	39,458	25,217	66	4,860	6,048
2023	40,771		66	2,519	992
2024	51,745		117	1,183	2,537
2025	51,620			44	
