= Cuautitlán Assembly =

Ford manufacturing facility in Mexico

The Cuautitlán Stamping and Assembly Plant (CSAP) is a Ford Motor Company manufacturing facility located in Cuautitlán Izcalli, Mexico. The 202-acre (0.82 km^{2}) site opened in 1964 and currently manufactures the Mustang Mach-E. The facility previously manufactured the Ford Fiesta.

Construction of the plant began in 1962 and plant was inaugurated on 4 November 1964. Full vehicular assembly operations began in 1970, and since production began, the plant has manufactured over 2.2 million vehicles.

After extensive modification, the plant began manufacture of the model year 2011 Fiesta subcompact for the North American market. Modifications included an expansion of 25,800 m^{2} (278,000 sq ft), construction of five new lines of high-productivity presses, incorporation of 270 robots and in-line measuring systems, as well as incorporation of adjustable ergonomic platforms in the upholstery area and new paint facilities. The plant effectively includes all major subassemblies of the vehicle body as well as final assembly.

The plant has been confirmed to produce the new 2021 Mustang Mach-E electric performance SUV for global markets, including the United States.

== Products ==
=== Current ===
- Ford Mustang Mach-E (2021–present)

=== Past ===
- Ford Contour (1995-2000)
- Ford F-Series (1991–2009)
- Ford Fiesta Ikon (2001–2007)
- Ford Fiesta (2011–2019)
- Ford Topaz (1983-1994)
- Ford Ghia (1990-1994)
- Ford Grand Marquis (1982-1984; 1991-1994)
- Ford Mustang (1978-1984)
- Ford Thunderbird (1985-1994)
- Ford Cougar (1985-1994)
- Mercury Mystique (1995-2000)
