= Audi Brussels =

Car manufacturing plant

Coordinates: 50°48′34″N 4°18′42″E

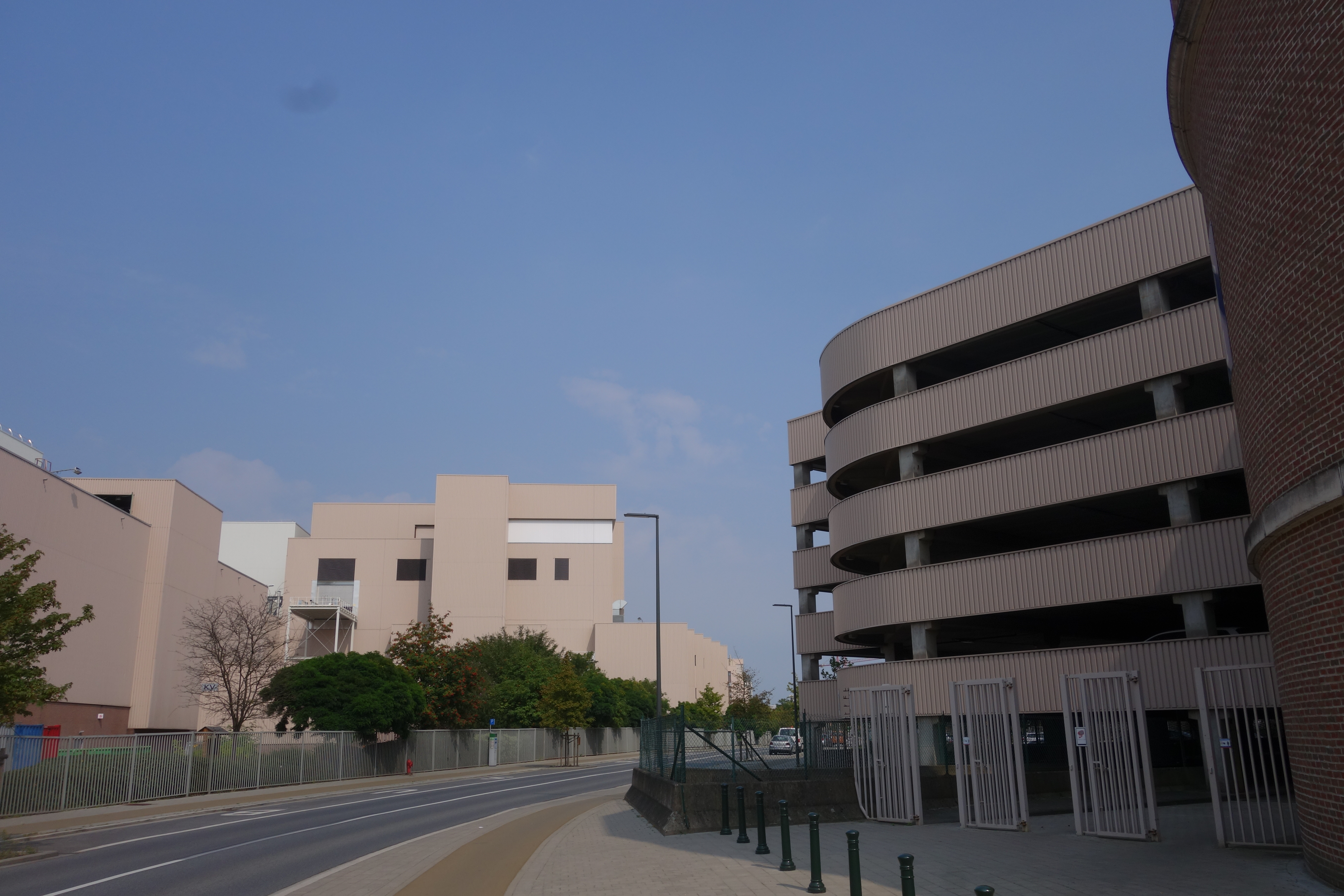
- Industry: Automotive industry
- Headquarters: Brussels

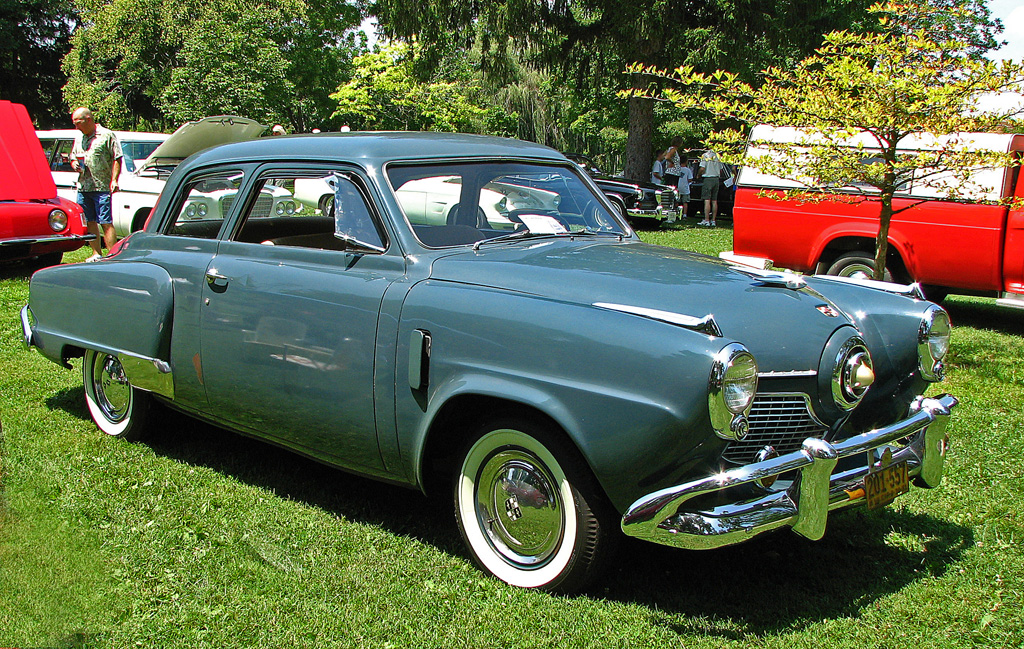
The plant started to assemble Studebakers in 1949.

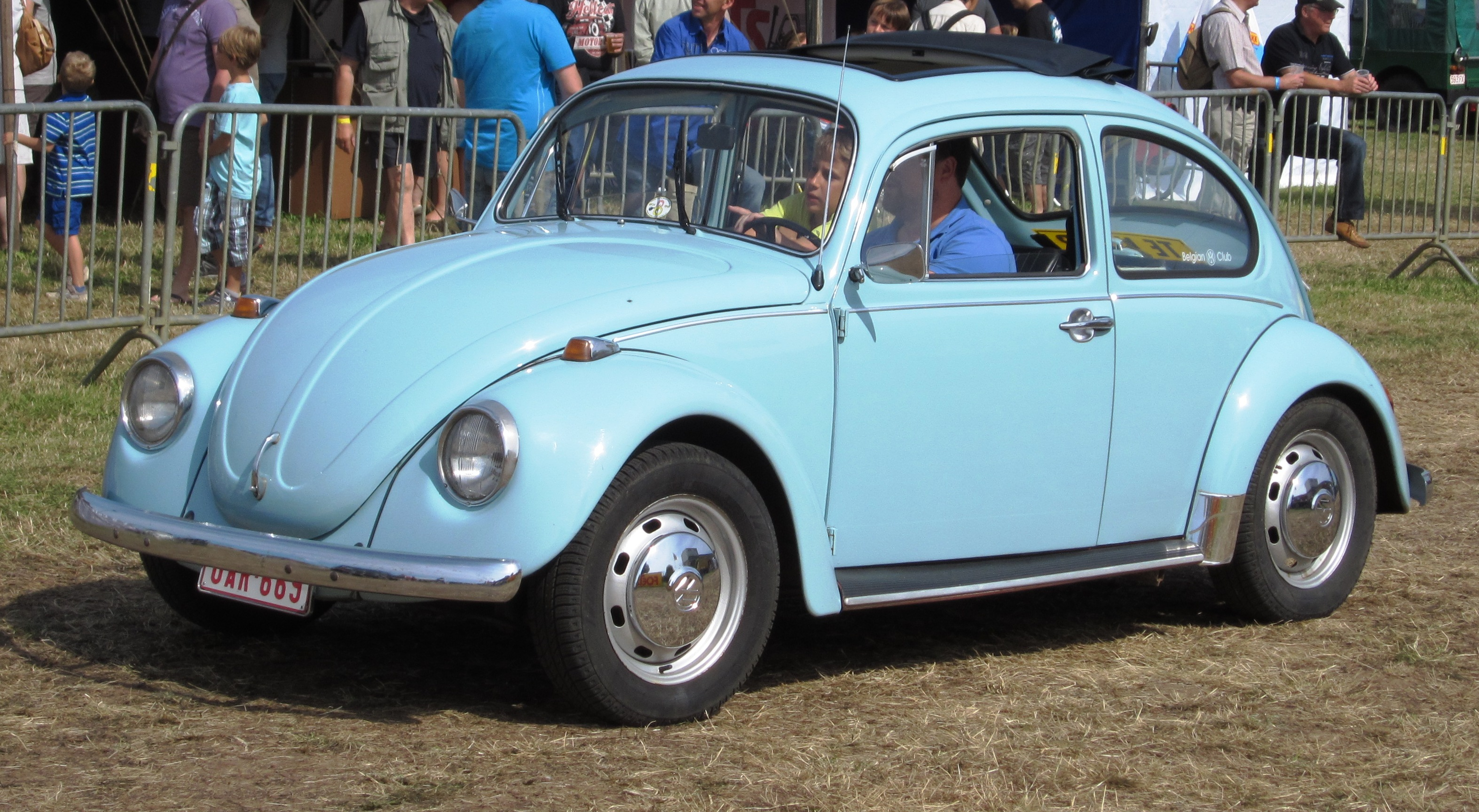
More than 1,000,000 Volkswagen Beetles emerged from the Belgian plant between 1954 and 1975

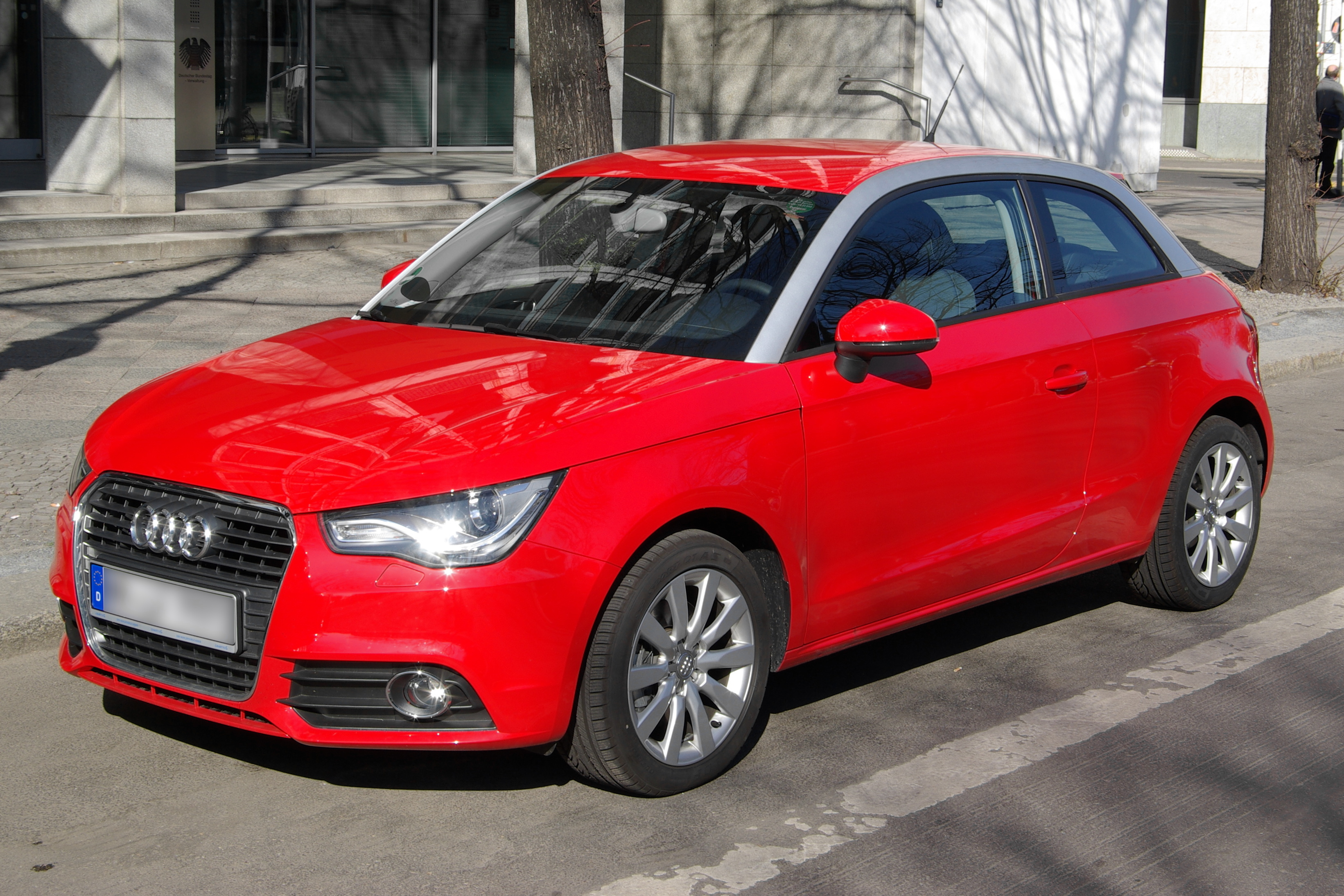
In 2012 the Vorst plant became the only plant in Europe manufacturing the Audi A1.

Audi Brussels (before 2008 known as Volkswagen Vorst or Volkswagen Forest) was an Audi manufacturing plant located in Forest, Belgium, a municipality located in the south-western part of the Brussels-Capital Region. It closed for good in February 2025.

== History ==
=== Beginning to 2005 ===
In 1948 Pierre D'Ieteren, scion of a family of industrialists with a long established coach-building business, entered into an agreement with Volkswagen to import cars into Belgium. A little later work began on the construction of an auto-assembly plant, with the first stone of the building laid on 1 September 1948.

In addition to his business as a Volkswagen importer, D’Ieteren had been the Belgian importer before the war of several US brands including Studebaker. A few months after the importation deal with Volkswagen, in April 1949, the first locally assembled Studebaker emerged from what had now become a car factory. Thanks to the partnership between D’Ietern and Studebaker, it became the third most popular American car in Belgium, behind Ford and Chevrolet.

As the auto industry recovered from the hiatus created by war, it was beginning to become clear that in Belgium, as in much of Europe, the future for volume auto-manufacturing lay with smaller cars than those designed for North America, and from 1954 the plant started to assemble Volkswagens alongside the Studebakers. At this time the plant covered an area of more than 314,000 square meters, and the workforce of 750 people were producing approximately 75 cars per day. On 13 May 1960 the 100,000th Volkswagen came off the Brussels production line. Also in 1960, with Studebaker obliged by their delicate financial position to concentrate management attention on their domestic situation, production of Studebakers in Brussels came to an end and the plant concentrated on building Volkswagens and the Porsches which now were also assembled here.

In the two decades till 1970, the business retained its independence and flourished. By 1970 the plant had produced 835,236 cars, of which more than 95% (795,581) were Volkswagen Beetles. More than 2% (21,675) were Studebakers and most of the rest were Volkswagen vans or Porsches. D‘Ieteren surrendered the plant at the end of 1970 after which full ownership transferred to Volkswagen. However, the business continued in the auto distribution business, and in 2012 D’Ieteren remains the distributor in Belgium of the various Volkswagen brands: Volkswagen, Audi, Škoda, SEAT, Lamborghini, Bentley and Bugatti, currently account for 22% of the Belgian passenger car market. D‘Ieteren also owns various car related businesses in Belgium including the "Carglass" windscreen replacement company.

The millionth Belgian produced Beetle was produced in 1974 which was also the year in which D’Ieteren obtained exclusive franchise for the import into Belgium of Audis. A year later, with the western world's appetite for Beetles no longer insatiable, the plant produced its 1,143,464th and final Volkswagen Type 1 in 1975. The plant now switched to production of the company's new Passat model. The Passat was joined at the Belgian plant by the Mk1 Golf in 1980. In the middle of 2001 production of the VW Lupo was transferred from Wolfsburg to the Brussels plant, although by this time customer demand for this model was tailing off and it was replaced on European markets by the Brazilian built VW Fox in 2005. At various stages, the Vorst plant also produced the Audi A3 and the VW Polo.

=== Change from VW to Audi ===
In 2006 the plant was producing approximately 200,000 cars annually, most of them Golfs. On 21 November 2006 news was revealed that the plant, by now known as “Volkswagen Vorst”, would lose Volkswagen Golf production ahead of 2009 when the current model would be replaced in the company's European line-up by the Volkswagen Golf Mk6. This would be accompanied by the loss of more than 3,500 jobs at the plant which at this time employed approximately 4,500 or 5,000 people. A few days later the company made public its intentions to compensate for the loss of the Golf by producing a yet to be announced small Audi at the Brussels plant. The manufacturer nevertheless made clear that giving the new Audi model to Vorst would be conditional on a 20% improvement in efficiency from the work force, involving moderation of pay, additional hours worked and greater work-place flexibility. The company would also require “public support” for the investment.

A trades union demonstration in December 2006 was joined by between 15,000 and 25,000 people, and considerable political pressure was applied in defence of the auto-industry jobs involved. Sensitivities were already at a high pitch because of the acrimonious closure in 1997 of the Renault plant at Vilvoorde on the north side of Brussels.

During the ensuing period of negotiation the name of the plant was changed to Audi Brussels, and focus switched to production of the Audi A1.

=== 2010 to 2026 ===
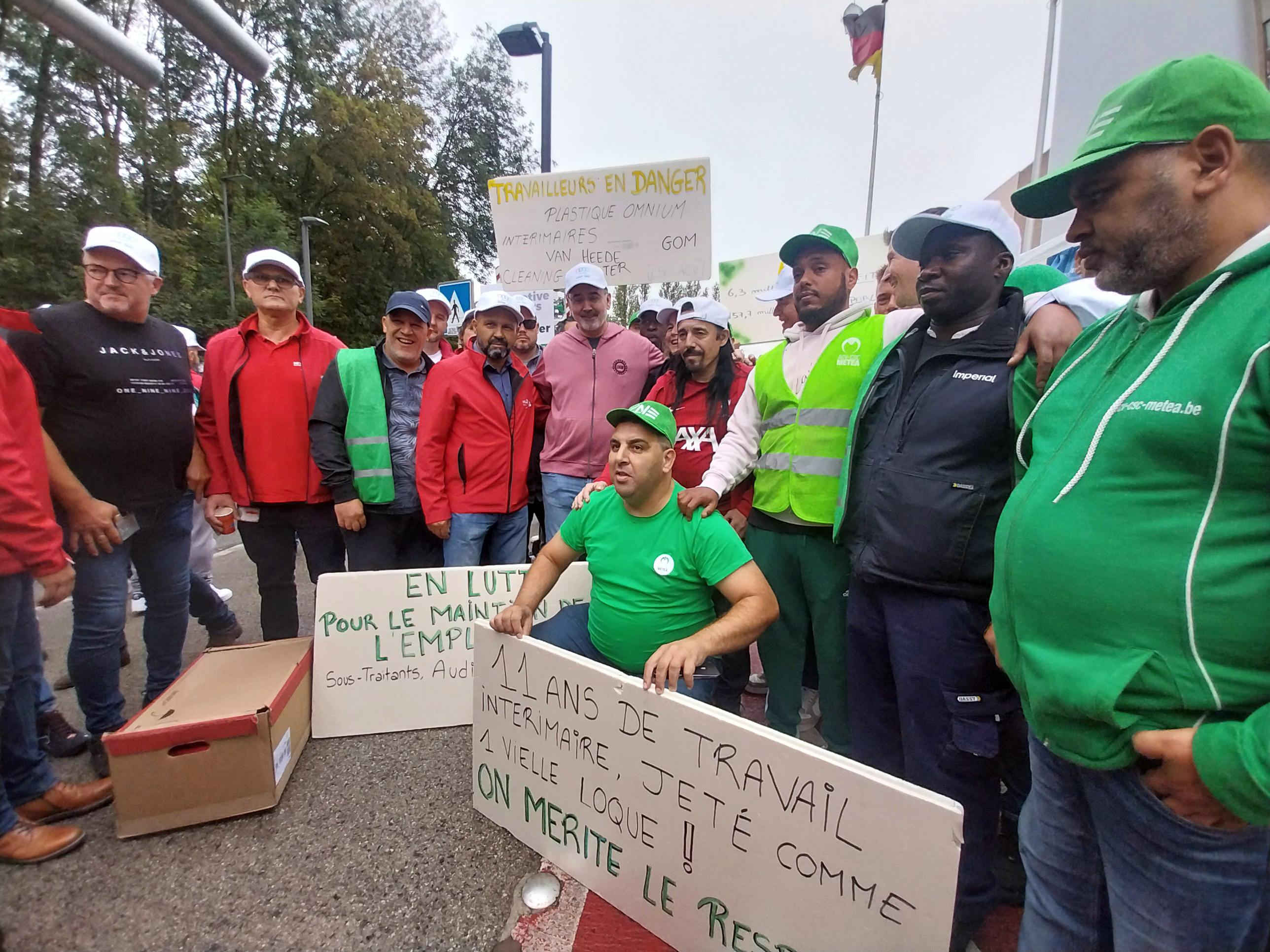
American labor leader Shawn Fain (UAW) visited a picket at Audi Brussels on September 6, 2024, in solidarity with the workers fighting against plant closure.

In 2010 the company planned to produce 50,000 Audi A1s with the number at least doubled in 2011. Despite the economic difficulties confronting the European auto industry in 2010, it was reported that the Audi A1 and the supportive approach of the Vorst plant workforce would guarantee 2,200 jobs for the ensuing six years. Towards the end of 2010 the Vorst plant produced its 7,000,000th car. In the event, the plant produced “about 120,000” A1s in 2011. The plant was re-equipped from 2016 to produce the Audi e-tron from 2018.

On 9 July 2024, Audi announced plans to dismiss up to 1410 (of 3000) employees in October 2024 and other 600 at the beginning of 2025.

On 29 October 2024, the factory announced that it would close its doors on 28 February 2025, after failing to find a buyer.

On September 1, 2026, it was announced that the Heylen Group had purchased the property.

== Production ==
- 1954 – 1975: Volkswagen Beetle (1,143,664 units)
- 1973 – 1997: Volkswagen Passat (1,257,235 units)
- 1980 – 2007: Volkswagen Golf (3,870,701 units)
- 1985 – 1988: Volkswagen Iltis (3,918 units)
- 1997 – 2001: SEAT Toledo (194,789 units)
- 1998 – 2000: SEAT León
- 2001 – 2005: Volkswagen Lupo (176,506 units)
- 2004 – 2009: Audi A3
- 2007 – 2010: Audi A3 Sportback
- 2006 – 2009: Volkswagen Polo (146,019 units)
- 2010 – 2018: Audi A1 (909,164 units)
- 2018 – 2022: Audi e-tron (160,000 units)
- 2020 – 2022: Audi e-tron Sportback
- December 2022 – February 2025: Audi Q8 e-tron
- December 2022 – February 2025: Audi Q8 e-tron Sportback
