= Ford GE1 platform =

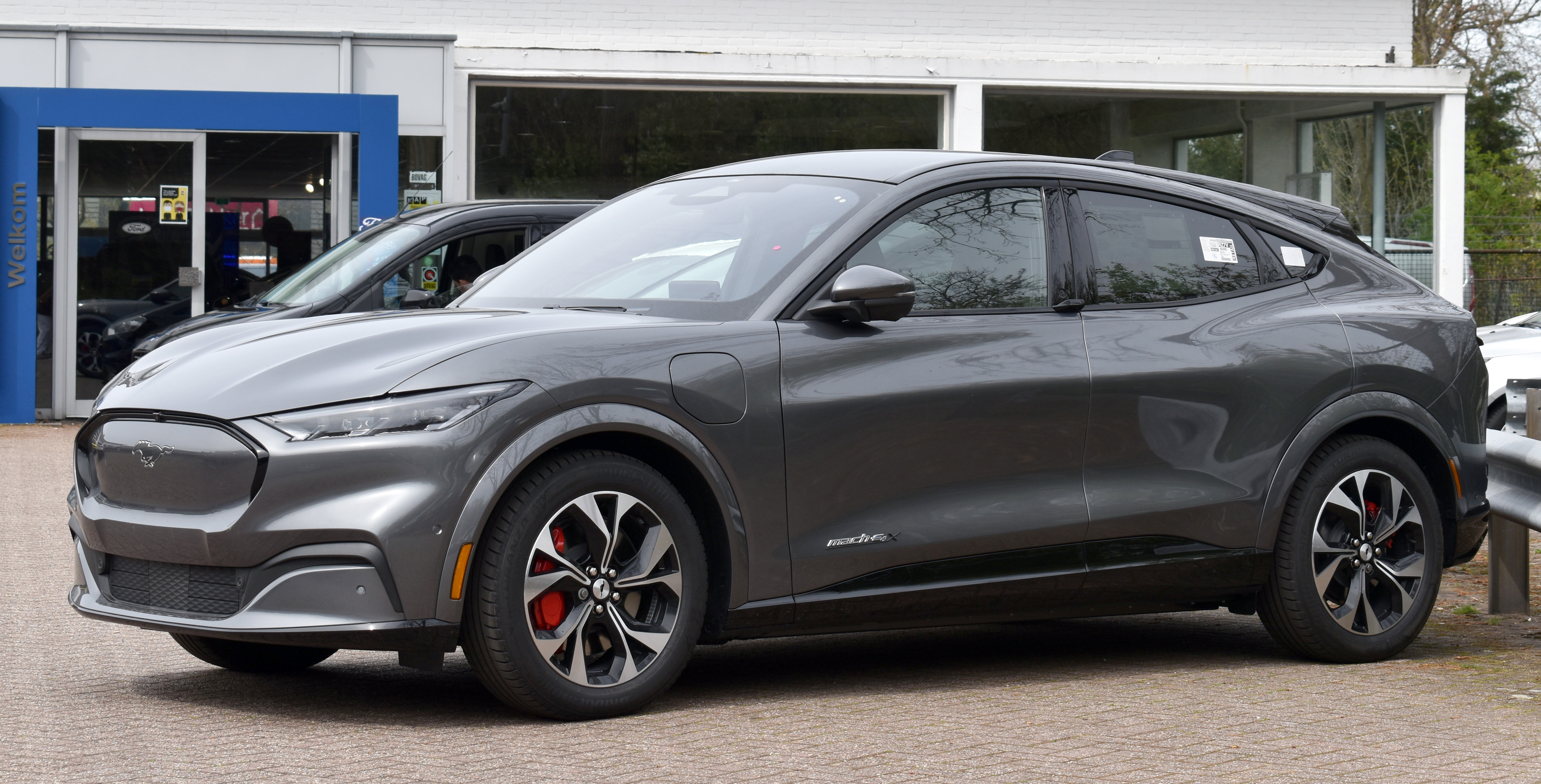
- 2021 Ford Mustang Mach-E

Overview
- Manufacturer: Ford
- Production: 2020–present

Body and chassis
- Layout: Rear-motor, rear-wheel-drive; Dual-motor, all-wheel-drive
- Related: Ford C2 platform

The Global Electrified 1 (GE1) platform is an electric vehicle platform developed by Ford under its dedicated global battery electric vehicle team named Team Edison. It is a heavily modified version of the C2 platform.

== Applications ==
- Ford Mustang Mach-E (2020–present)
