= Audi Q8 e-tron =

Battery electric mid-size luxury crossover SUV

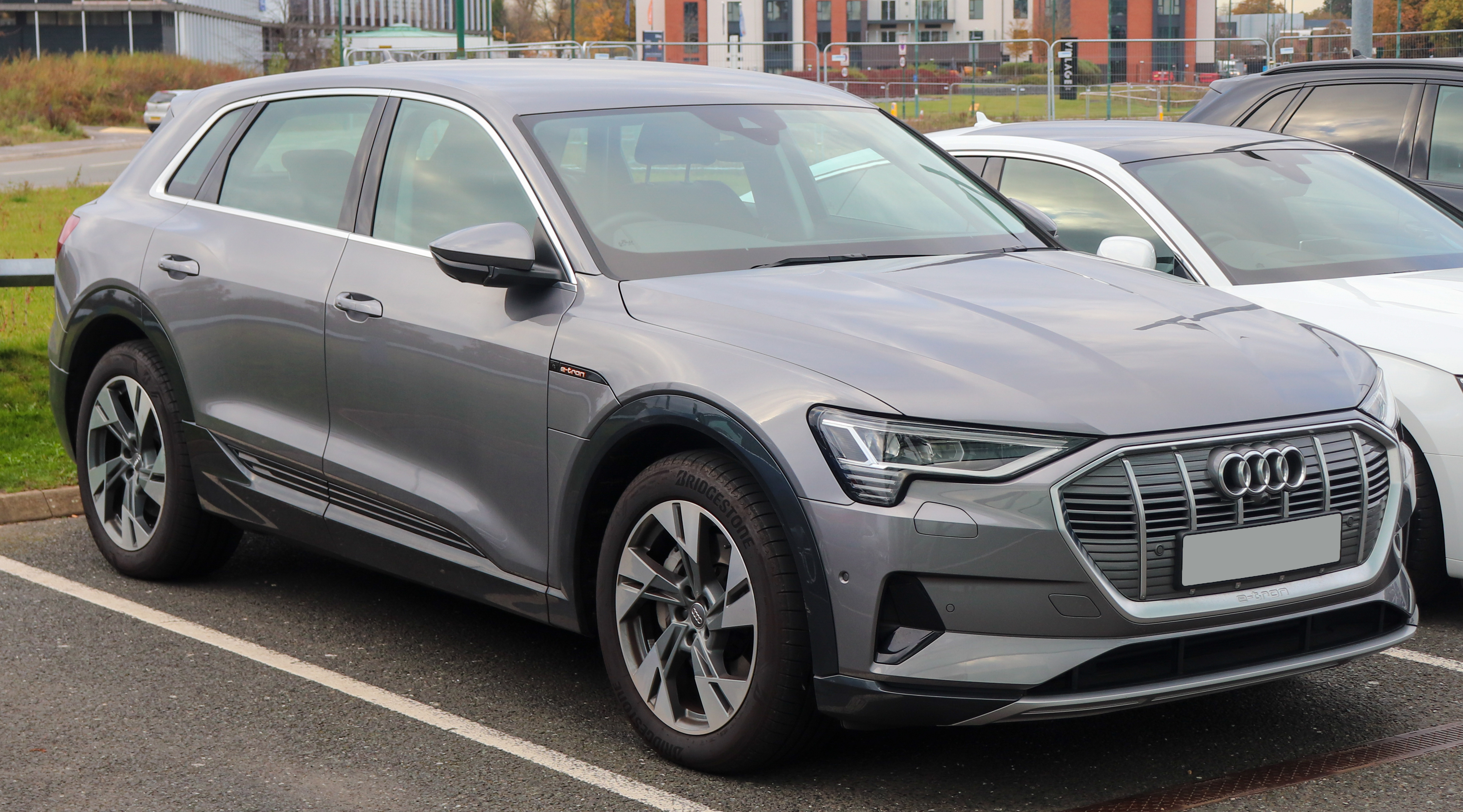
- 2020 Audi e-tron 50

Overview
- Manufacturer: Audi
- Also called: Audi e-tron (2018–2023)
- Production: September 2018 – February 2025
- Model years: 2019–2025
- Assembly: Belgium: Forest (Audi Brussels); China: Changchun (FAW-VW)
- Designer: Jürgen Löffler

Body and chassis
- Class: Mid-size luxury crossover SUV
- Body style: 5-door SUV; 5-door coupé SUV (Sportback)
- Layout: Dual or Triple-motors, four-wheel drive
- Platform: Volkswagen Group MLB Evo

Powertrain
- Electric motor: 2x asynchronous motors (ASMs); 3x asynchronous motors (ASMs) (SQ8 e-tron)
- Power output: Current versions; (Q8 e-tron): Q8 50 e-tron: 183 kW (245 hp); Q8 55 e-tron: 220 kW (295 hp); SQ8 e-tron: 370 kW (496 hp); Previous versions; (e-tron): 50 quattro: 230 kW (308 hp); 55 quattro: 300 to 370 kW (402 to 496 hp); S quattro: 370 kW (496 hp)
- Transmission: Single speed with fixed ratio
- Battery: Current versions; (Q8 e-tron): 55 e-tron: 114 kWh Li-ion (106 kWh usable); SQ8 e-tron: 114 kWh Li-ion (106 kWh usable); 50 e-tron: 95 kWh Li-ion (89 kWh usable); Previous versions; (e-tron): 55 quattro, post-update: 95 kWh Li-ion (86.5 kWh usable); 55 quattro: 95 kWh Li-ion (83.6 kWh usable); 50 quattro: 71 kWh Li-ion (64.7 kWh usable)
- Plug-in charging: EU: 11 kW AC; 22 kW AC (optional); US: 9.6 kW AC (with supplied charger); US: 11 kW AC (with 48 amp J1772 charger); All markets: 170 kW DC or 150 kW DC (Note: Previously, in the low-end model called 50 quattro, charging speed was limited to 120 kW while the 55 quattro model offered 150 kW charging. Currently, charging speeds are 150 kW in the low-end 50 e-tron model and 170 kW in both the 55 e-tron and SQ8 e-tron models.)

Dimensions
- Wheelbase: 2,928 mm (115.3 in)
- Length: 4,901 mm (193.0 in)
- Width: 1,935 mm (76.2 in)
- Height: 1,616 mm (63.6 in)
- Kerb weight: ~2,560 kg (5,643.8 lb)

The Audi Q8 e-tron (formerly the Audi e-tron until 2023) is a battery electric mid-size luxury crossover produced by Audi from 2019 to 2025. The e-tron was unveiled as a concept car at the 2015 Frankfurt Motor Show. The final production version was revealed in San Francisco on 17 September 2018, publicly debuted at the 2018 Paris Motor Show, and was first delivered in May 2019. It is the company's first battery electric mass production car. The Sportback variant, a coupe style of the e-tron, entered production in 2020.

In 2022, the vehicle was facelifted and also renamed as the Audi Q8 e-tron (the performance version is called the SQ8 e-tron), in both regular and Sportback body styles, as Audi is expanding the e-tron battery electric vehicle line-up.

In October 2024, Audi announced that by February 2025 the production of the Audi Q8 e-tron would come to an end.

== History ==
The Audi e-tron is based on the e-tron quattro concept that was unveiled at the 2015 Frankfurt Motor Show. It has an EPA range of 204 miles (328 km), or 222 miles (357 km) in the updated model. The Sportback variant has 218 miles (351 km) of EPA range, entered production in early 2020. The facelifted model revealed in 2022, known as the Q8 e-tron, offers 285 miles (459 km) of EPA range while the facelifted Sportback has an EPA range of 296 miles (476 km) or 300 miles (480 km) depending on the exact variant.

In 2018, it was reported that the car's certification in Germany by the KBA (Federal Motor Transport Authority) was not obtained until required changes were made to the car's software. In January 2019, United States market deliveries were due to commence in June.

The first customer in Germany received his e-tron in March 2019. In late April 2019 it was reported that prospective customers faced waiting lists of 6–7 months (putting the expected delivery date close to the end of 2019). The delays caused controversy in Norway, where customers were informed that their cars would be delivered up to 6 months later than originally promised unless they paid extra for a significantly more expensive "Fast Track" car. Further to this, some customers were also informed that were they to cancel their reservation they would be liable for a fine equal to 8% of the purchase price.

In Norway, the e-tron was the best-selling car or truck of any kind in October 2019. In November 2019, it ranked #3. It was also the best-selling car or truck of any kind in Norway in the year 2020, outselling the Tesla Model 3.

In the Netherlands, the e-tron was the #2 most registered car of any kind in December 2019.

In 2020, the New Zealand government started purchasing e-trons as official government cars.

Audi paused production of the e-tron in February 2020 due to supply chain problems including issues with adequate supply of batteries for the e-tron. Production resumed in early May.

In 2022, Audi announced that the facelifted e-tron would be renamed to Audi Q8 e-tron (unrelated to the existing Audi Q8), which was revealed on 9 November 2022.

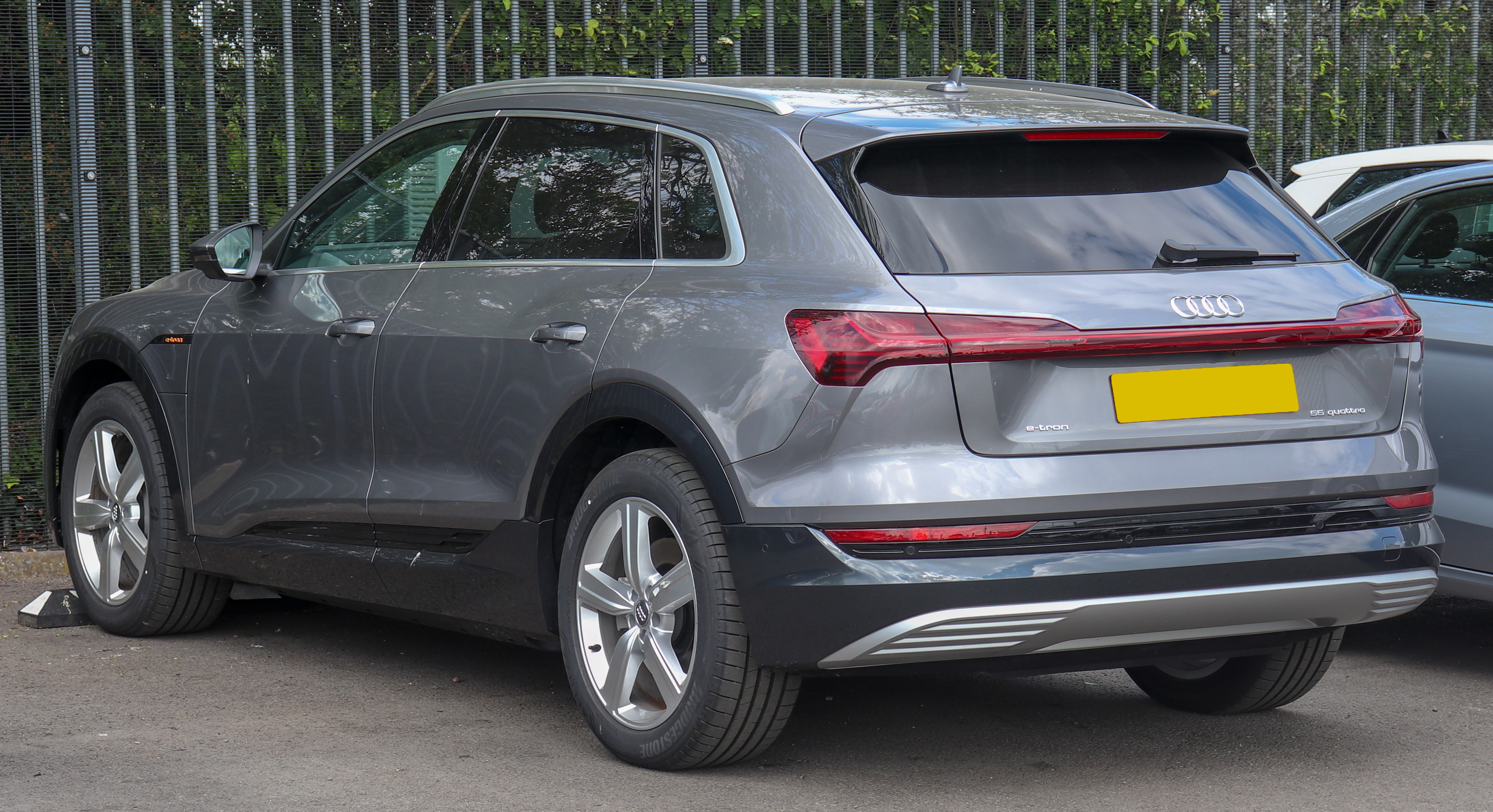
Rear view (e-tron)

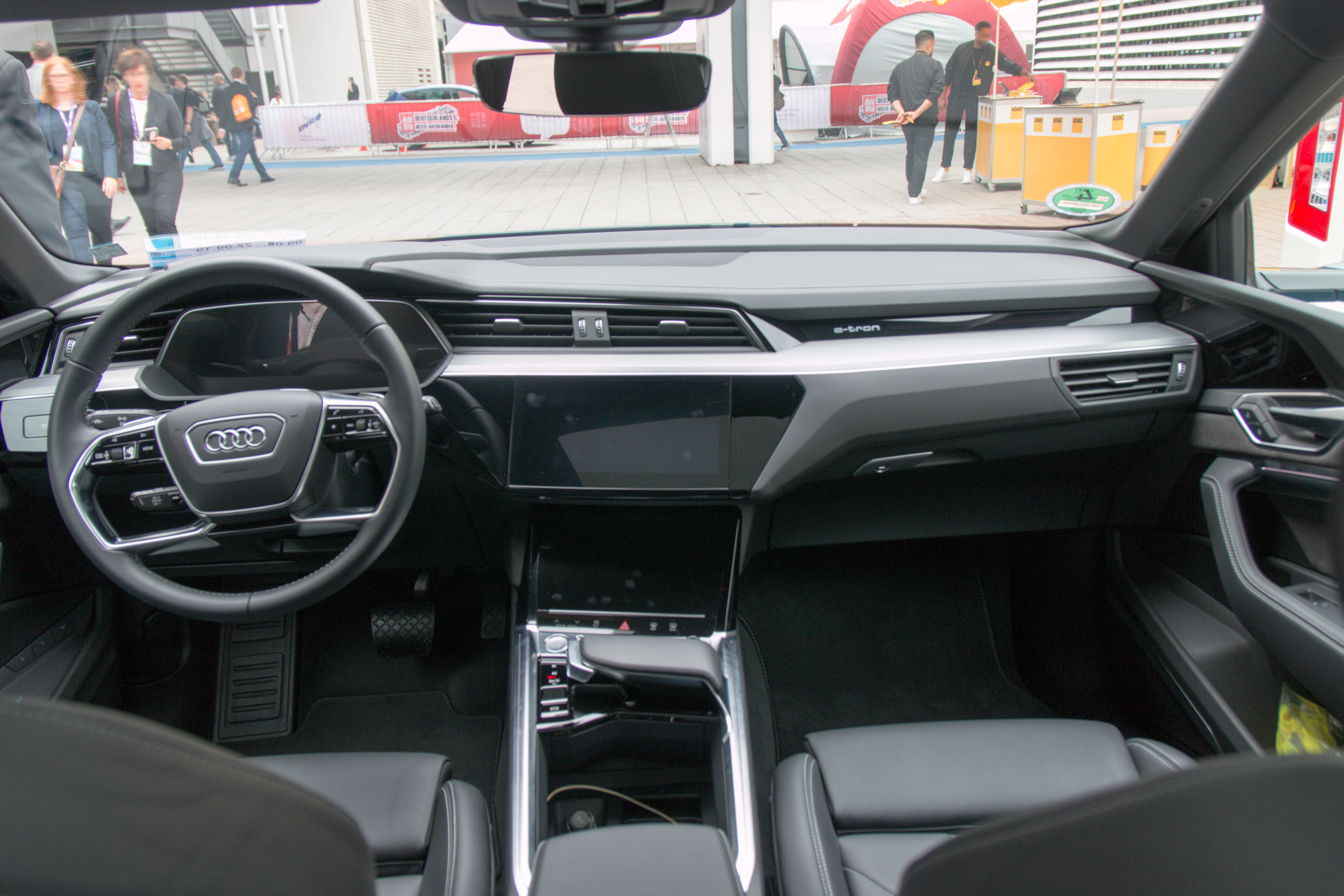
Interior (e-tron)

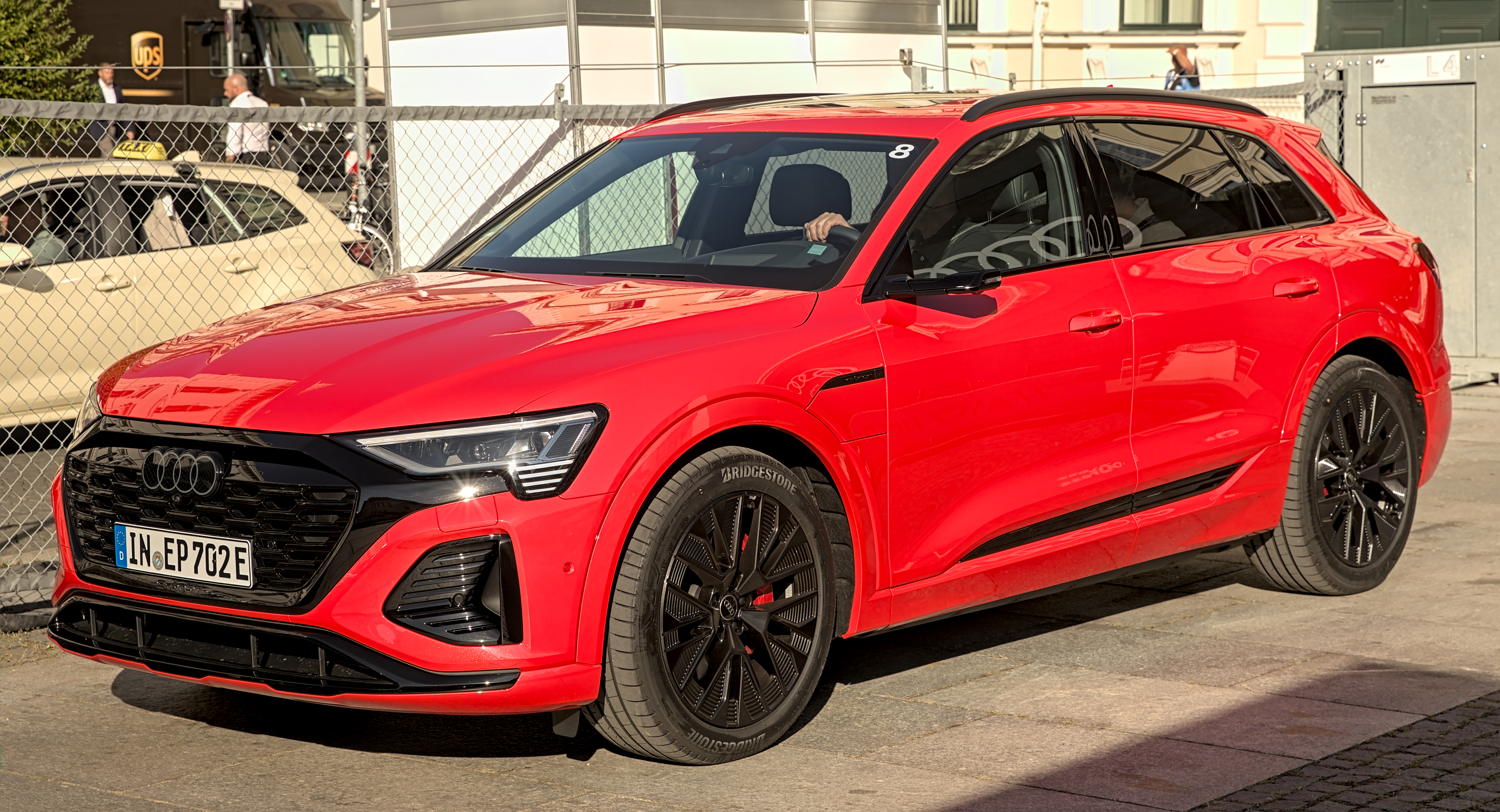
Q8 e-tron

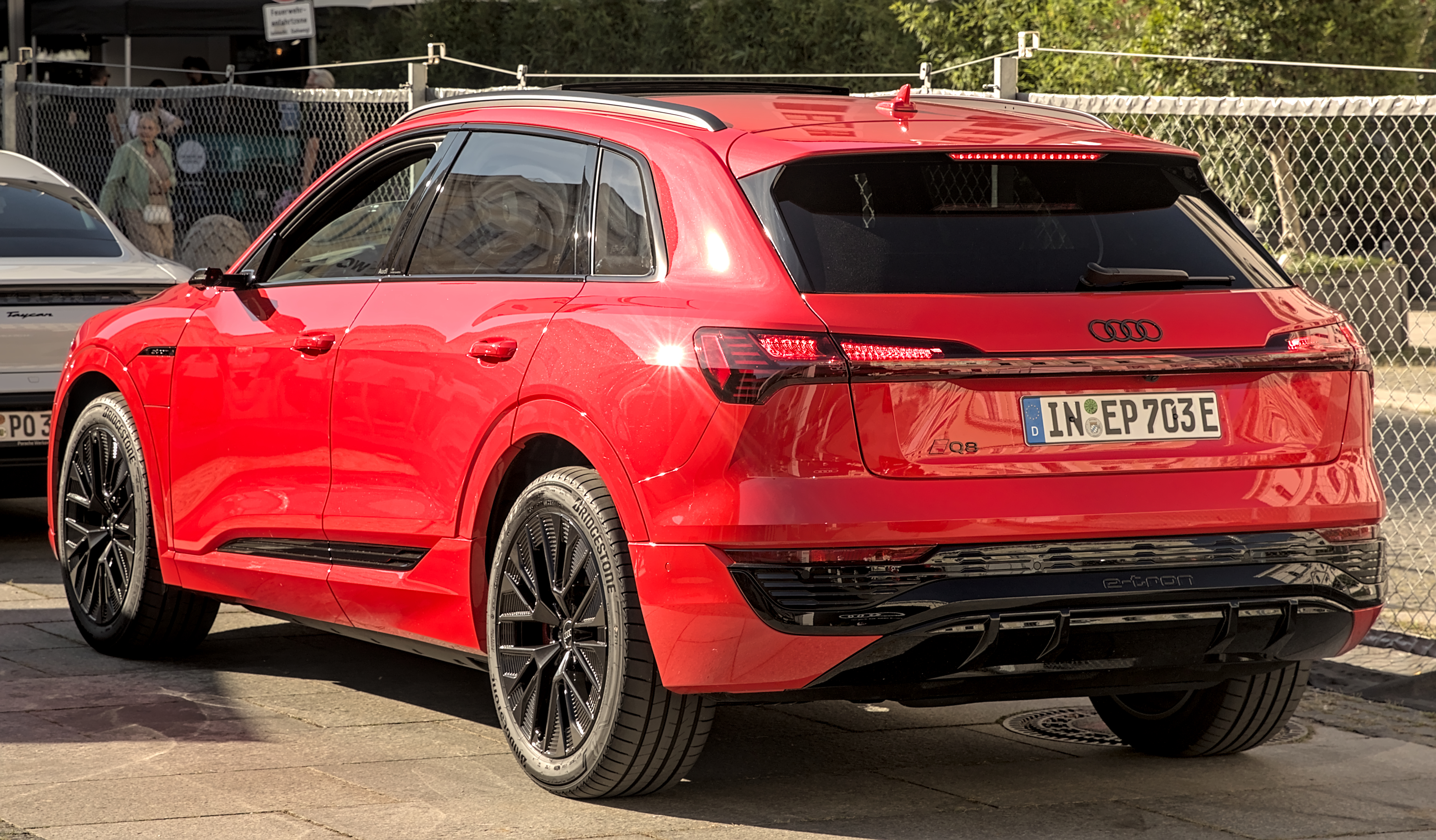
Q8 e-tron rear view

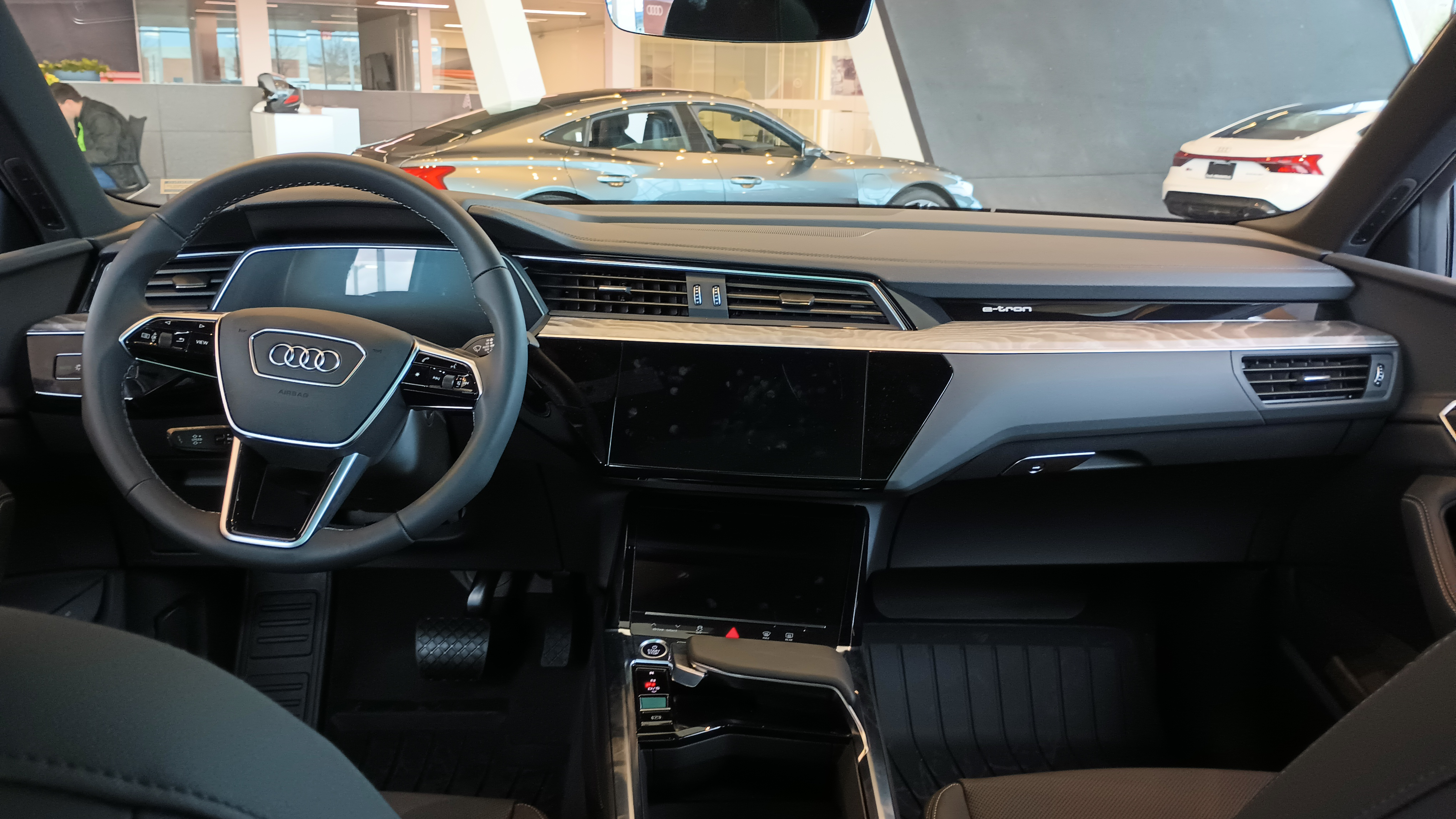
Q8 e-tron interior

== Specifications ==
The Audi Q8 e-tron is powered by a 114 kWh battery, of which 106 kWh is usable. This is true for the 55 e-tron variant and the performance SQ8 e-tron variant, while the 50 e-tron variant has a smaller battery.

Previously, the Audi e-tron was powered by a 95 kWh battery pack, of which 86.5 kWh (formerly 83.6 kWh) was usable. It can be charged from zero to 80% in around 30 minutes using 150 kW DC fast-chargers. For home charging in the EU, a standard 11 kW charger recharges the pack in 8.5 hours, while an optional 22 kW charger halves this time. In the US, a 40A 9.6 kW J1772 charger is supplied by Audi, but 11 kW can still be achieved using a 3rd party 48+ amp J1772 charger. A thermal management system (also serving the motors and power electronics) keeps the battery between 23 and 35 degrees Celsius, and battery modules (twelve 60 Ah cells each) can be replaced.

The quattro electric all-wheel drive uses two electric motors, one mounted in the front and one in the rear. In the "boost mode," the two motors provide a total system output of 300 kW (408 PS; 402 hp) and 664 N⋅m (490 lb⋅ft) of torque enabling the car to accelerate from 0–100 km/h (0–62 mph) in 5.7 seconds. When not in the boost mode, the combined peak motor power is 265 kW (360 PS; 355 hp), with 125 kW (170 PS; 168 hp) from the front motor at a torque of 247 N⋅m (182 lb⋅ft) and 140 kW (190 PS; 188 hp) from the rear motor at a torque of 314 N⋅m (232 lb⋅ft). This allows the car to accelerate from 0–100 km/h (0–62 mph) in 6.6 seconds and on to its top speed of 200 km/h (120 mph).

The car uses an energy recuperation system that, on average, contributes 30% to the range. Recuperation can be achieved both when the driver releases the accelerator and when applying pressure to the brake pedal.

When equipped with the virtual side mirrors the car has a drag coefficient of 0.27. The e-tron also sits slightly lower than a traditional SUV; at 1,616 mm (63.6 in) high, it is 43 mm (1.7 in) lower than the Audi Q5. It has 660 litres (23 cu ft) of boot space, 160 L (5.7 cu ft) more than the Mercedes-Benz EQC, along with 60 litres (2.1 cu ft) of storage space in the front.

=== Cold-weather performance ===
In temperatures ranging from −6.5 to −4.5 °C (20.3 to 23.9 °F), with cabin heating on, the e-tron achieved a real-world range of 331 kilometres (206 mi), compared to 370 kilometres (230 mi) in the spring/summer (also with cabin heating/air conditioning on), which means a 10.5% range drop. The tests were done at the speed of 90 kilometres per hour (56 mph).

The real winter range drop might be slightly higher, because in the aforementioned tests the "winter" car had the advantage of more aerodynamic wheels than the "summer" car.

This stands well in comparison to other EVs. Five other electric vehicles, including the 2017 Tesla Model S 75D, were tested at the temperature of −6.7 °C (20 °F) with cabin heating on, and all of them had a range drop of at least 30%, and 41% on average (compared to when the temperature was 23.9 °C (75.0 °F) and cabin heating/air conditioning was off).

The e-tron is, in summer driving, less efficient than the Tesla Model X in terms of distance covered per kWh of energy. The e-tron is less affected by low temperatures, however, so driving in the winter brings the results of these two vehicles closer. In a test done at temperatures in the 13 to 15 °C (55 to 59 °F) range and including high-speed highway driving, the e-tron's efficiency was about 12.4% worse than in the Model X. In slightly below-freezing conditions, the difference was smaller and the e-tron's efficiency was only about 8.6% worse than in the Model X.

=== Charging ===
The e-tron was able to charge at an effective rate of 150 kW using a 175 kW charger. This was possible in a wide state-of-charge window, until the battery was about 80% charged. With such a charger, adding 100 kilometres (62 mi) of range takes only 10 minutes. Audi of America is more cautious with their estimates, saying that 87 kilometres (54 mi) of range can be added in 10 minutes when using a 150 kW charger.

At 90%, charging rate is about 82 kW and it remains above 50 kW until reaching 100%.

Using a 50 kW charger, the car can be charged at a constant rate of 50 kW, up until reaching 100%.

In 2022, with the introduction of a larger battery (and the renaming of the vehicle, which is now known as the Audi Q8 e-tron), the charging speed was increased to 170 kW (150 kW in the low-end variant).

=== Safety ===
==== ANCAP ====
ANCAP test results* Audi Q8 e-tron (2019, aligned with Euro NCAP)
Test	Points	%
Overall:	5 /5 stars	
Adult occupant:	34.8	91%
Child occupant:	43.1	88%
Pedestrian:	34.3	71%
Safety assist:	10.2	78%

==== Euro NCAP ====
Euro NCAP test results* Audi e-tron 55 quattro (LHD) (2019)
Test	Points	%
Overall:	5 /5 stars	
Adult occupant:	34.9	91%
Child occupant:	41.7	85%
Pedestrian:	34.4	71%
Safety assist:	10	76%

== Equipment ==
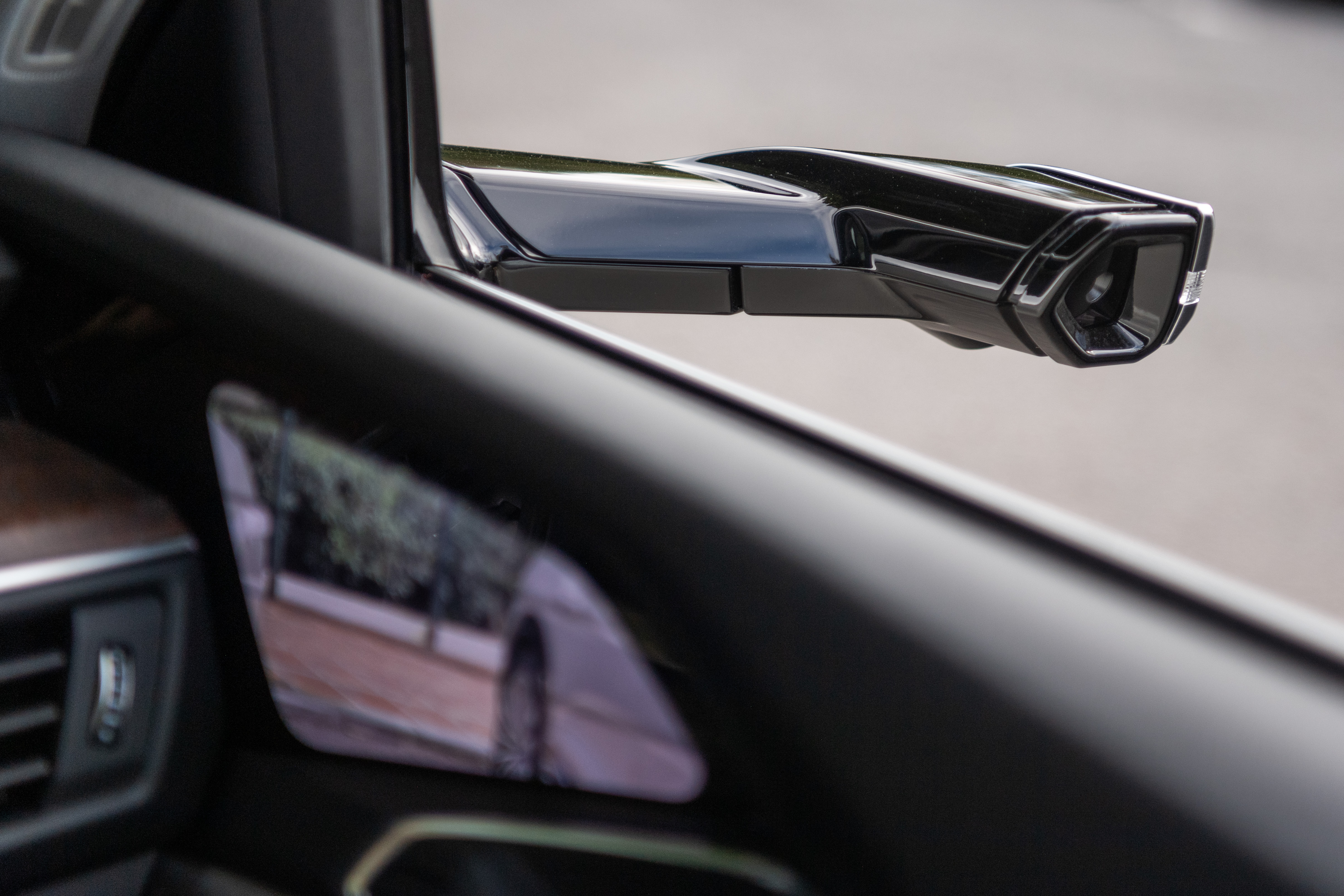
Virtual side mirrors

Standard equipment for the e-tron includes 12-way heated and ventilated front seats, a panoramic moonroof, and 20-inch wheels. Upgrades include massage seats, power door closers, leather upholstery, 21-inch wheels and orange brake calipers. The interior is in line with other Audi models with a 10.1-inch infotainment screen, a smaller 8.6-inch touchscreen display, Amazon Alexa voice control, Virtual Cockpit system, and an optional head up display. Other equipments include a Bang & Olufsen sound system, and an available Driver Assistance package with enhanced adaptive cruise control, automatic parking assist and night vision. The e-tron is the second production car to offer optional virtual side mirrors, which replaces the traditional side-view mirrors and instead use cameras transmitting images to a high-contrast 7-inch OLED embedded in the door panels.

== Sportback ==
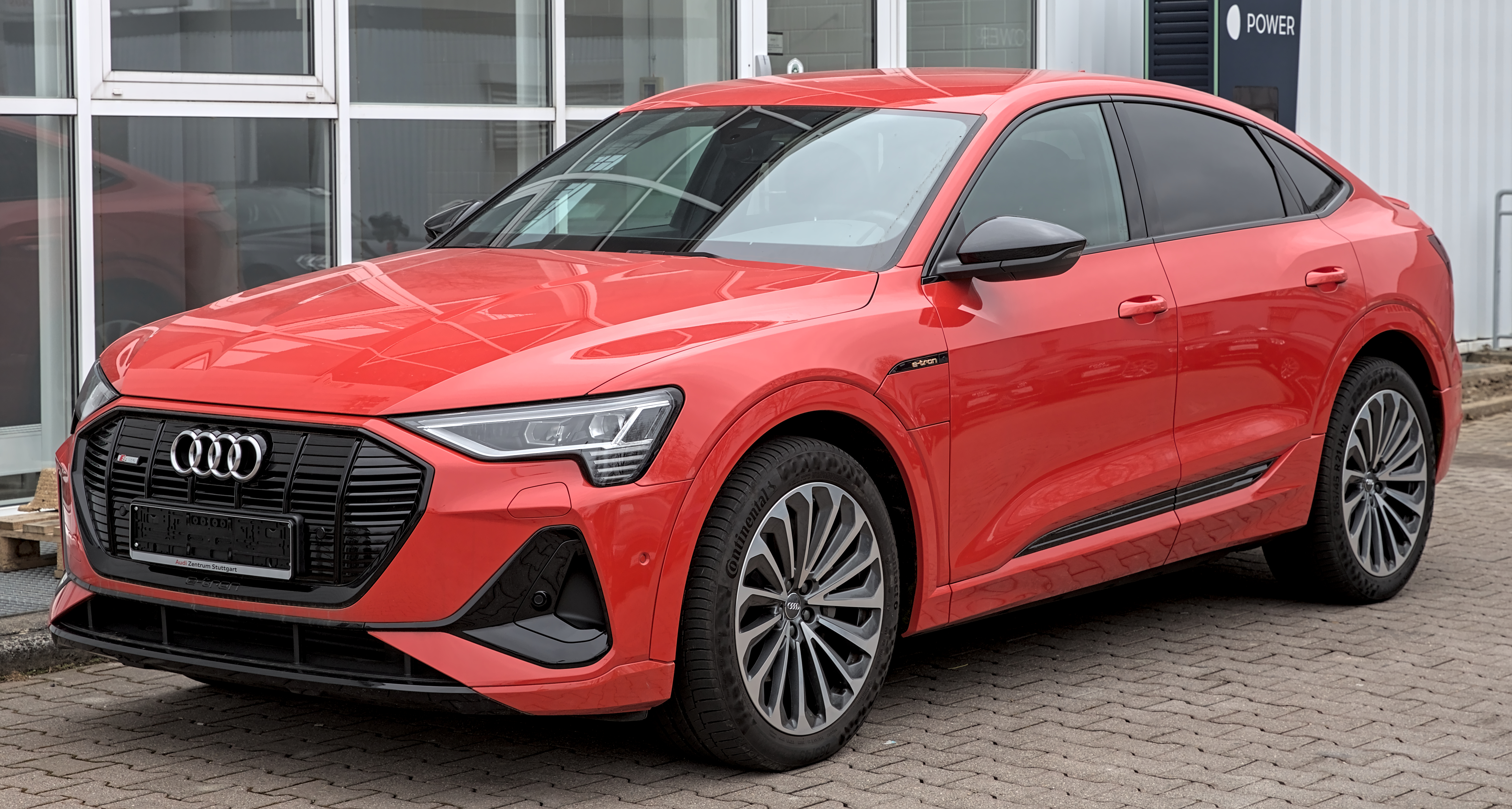

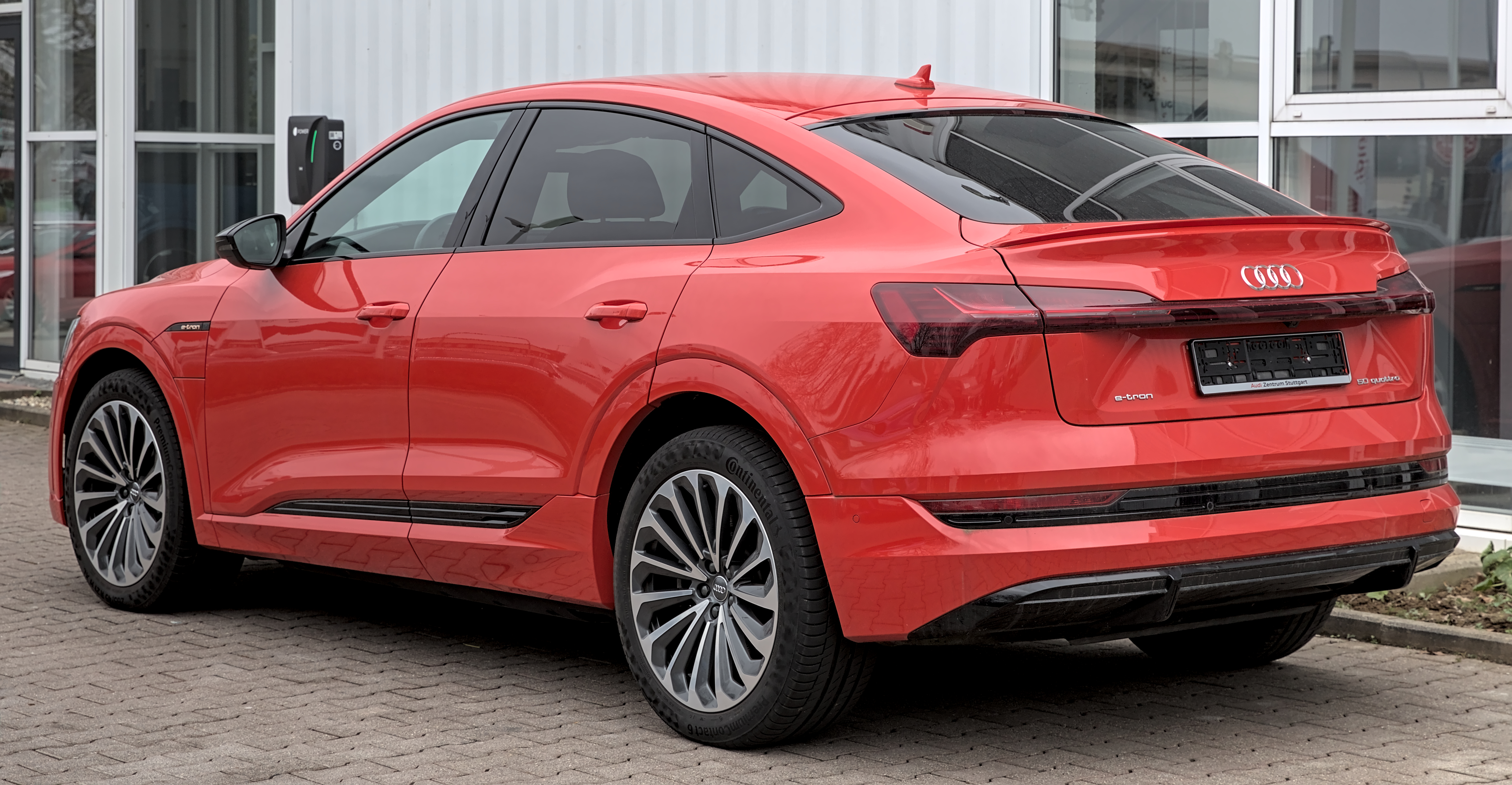
e-tron Sportback

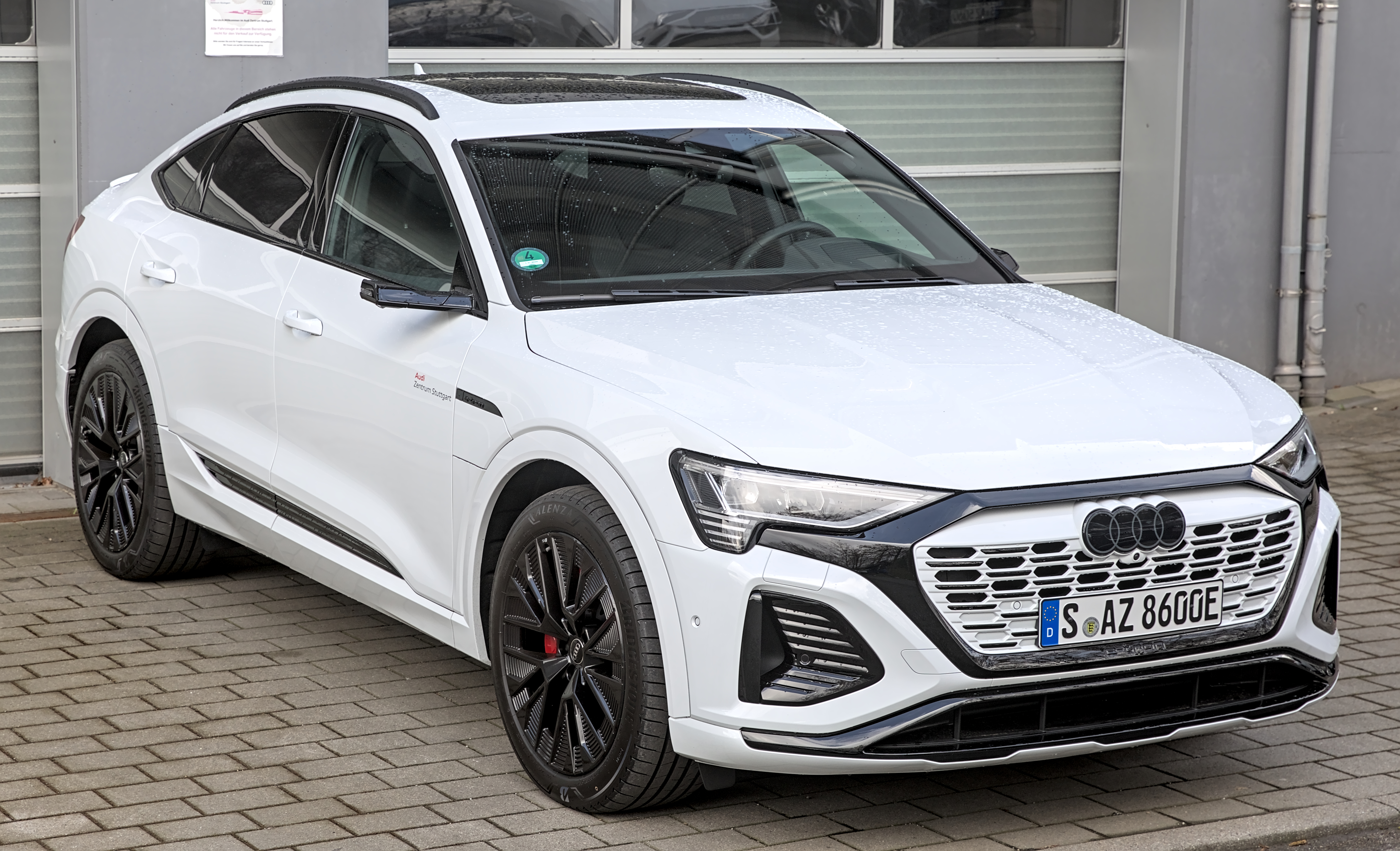

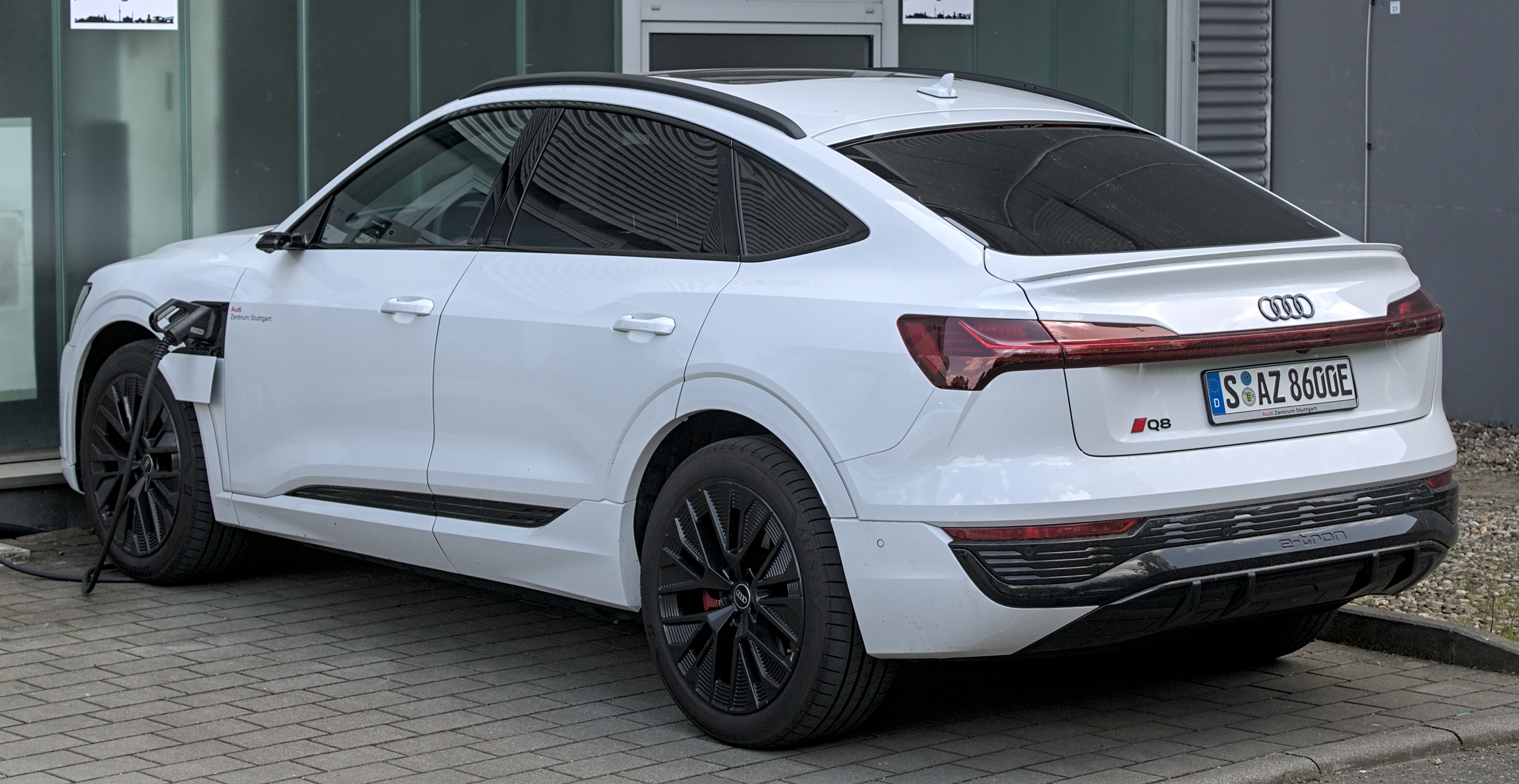
Q8 e-tron Sportback

In addition to the conventional SUV body style, Audi released a 'Sportback' version with a sloping rear part of the roof, similar to the BMW X6 and the Mercedes-Benz GLE Coupe. Audi decided to compete with these ICE-powered rivals by offering only a pure electric vehicle. It entered production in early 2020 and became available in Europe and in the US in 2020. Comparisons to the styling of the Audi A7 have also been made.

The production version debuted at AutoMobility LA in Los Angeles in November 2019. The length and width are the same as in the standard model, while the height is 1.3 cm (0.5 in) lower. (Note: In the European-specification model.) A drag coefficient is lower than in the standard model (0.25 vs. 0.27), (Note: Both cars equipped with virtual side mirrors; Sportback also equipped with S-line package.) while the powertrain and battery are the same as in the original model.

The 2020 e-tron Sportback has an EPA range of 218 miles (351 km). It is better than in the 2019 e-tron conventional SUV, partially because a larger percentage of the battery capacity is usable. The e-tron's battery management system keeps part of the battery capacity as a buffer, which is not part of the usable capacity; now the size of that buffer is decreased to unlock more usable capacity. This change (as well as some others like reducing usage of the AWD mode) was introduced in the e-tron conventional SUV during the production run; while the Sportback already had these modifications when it first went on the market.

Cargo space measured by European standards is reduced from 660 L (23.3 cu ft) to 615 L (21.7 cu ft). (Note: Or, according to a different methodology, from 605 L (21.4 cu ft) to 555 L (19.6 cu ft).) American sources, however, measure cargo space in a different way and indicate that the original e-tron has as much as 821 L (29.0 cu ft) of cargo space, so the reduction to 615 L (21.7 cu ft) is substantial.

== Powertrain ==
Model	Years	Power	Torque	0–100 km/h (0–62 mph)	Top speed	Range
SQ8 e-tron quattro	9 November 2022–	370 kW (503 PS; 496 hp)	973 N⋅m (718 lb⋅ft)	4.5 s	210 km/h (130 mph)	EPA: unknown WLTP: 499 km (310 mi)
Q8 e-tron 55 quattro	9 November 2022–	220 kW (299 PS; 295 hp)	664 N⋅m (490 lb⋅ft)	5.8 s	204 km/h (127 mph)	EPA: unknown WLTP: 582 km (362 mi)
Q8 e-tron 50 quattro	9 November 2022–	183 kW (249 PS; 245 hp)	664 N⋅m (490 lb⋅ft)	6 s	204 km/h (127 mph)	EPA: unknown WLTP: 491 km (305 mi)
SQ8 e-tron quattro Sportback	9 November 2022–	370 kW (503 PS; 496 hp)	973 N⋅m (718 lb⋅ft)	4.5 s	210 km/h (130 mph)	EPA: unknown WLTP: 513 km (319 mi)
Q8 e-tron 55 quattro Sportback	9 November 2022–	220 kW (299 PS; 295 hp)	664 N⋅m (490 lb⋅ft)	5.8 s	204 km/h (127 mph)	EPA: unknown WLTP: 600 km (373 mi)
Q8 e-tron 50 quattro Sportback	9 November 2022–	183 kW (249 PS; 245 hp)	664 N⋅m (490 lb⋅ft)	6 s	204 km/h (127 mph)	EPA: unknown WLTP: 505 km (314 mi)
e-tron S quattro	2022–	125 kW (168 hp) + 140 kW (188 hp) (boost mode: 370 kW (496 hp))	247 N⋅m (182 lb⋅ft) + 314 N⋅m (232 lb⋅ft) (boost mode: 973 N⋅m (718 lb⋅ft)	6.6 s (boost mode: 5.7 s)	200 km/h (124 mph)	EPA: 218 mi (351 km) WLTP: 369 to 444 km (229 to 276 mi)
e-tron 55 quattro (post-update)	2020–	125 kW (168 hp) + 140 kW (188 hp) (boost mode: 370 kW (496 hp))	247 N⋅m (182 lb⋅ft) + 314 N⋅m (232 lb⋅ft) (boost mode: 664 N⋅m (490 lb⋅ft))	6.6 s (boost mode: 5.7s)	200 km/h (124 mph)	EPA: 222 mi (357 km) WLTP: 365 to 436 km (227 to 271 mi)
e-tron 55 quattro	2018–2019	125 kW (168 hp) + 140 kW (188 hp) (boost mode: 300 kW (402 hp))	247 N⋅m (182 lb⋅ft) + 314 N⋅m (232 lb⋅ft) (boost mode: 664 N⋅m (490 lb⋅ft))	6.6 s (boost mode: 5.7 s)	200 km/h (124 mph)	EPA: 204 mi (328 km) WLTP: 358 to 417 km (222 to 259 mi)
e-tron 50 quattro	2019–	100 kW (134 hp) + 130 kW (174 hp)	230 N⋅m (170 lb⋅ft) + 310 N⋅m (229 lb⋅ft)	6.8 s	190 km/h (118 mph)	EPA: unknown WLTP: 276 to 336 km (171 to 209 mi)
e-tron S quattro Sportback	2022–	125 kW (168 hp) + 140 kW (188 hp) (boost mode: 300 kW (402 hp))	247 N⋅m (182 lb⋅ft) + 314 N⋅m (232 lb⋅ft) (boost mode: 664 N⋅m (490 lb⋅ft)	6.6 s (boost mode: 5.7 s)	200 km/h (124 mph)	EPA: 218 mi (351 km) WLTP: 369 to 444 km (229 to 276 mi)
e-tron 55 quattro Sportback	2020–	125 kW (168 hp) + 140 kW (188 hp) (boost mode: 300 kW (402 hp))	247 N⋅m (182 lb⋅ft) + 314 N⋅m (232 lb⋅ft) (boost mode: 664 N⋅m (490 lb⋅ft)	6.6 s (boost mode: 5.7 s)	200 km/h (124 mph)	EPA: 218 mi (351 km) WLTP: 369 to 444 km (229 to 276 mi)
e-tron 50 quattro Sportback	2020–	100 kW (134 hp) + 130 kW (174 hp)	230 N⋅m (170 lb⋅ft) + 310 N⋅m (229 lb⋅ft)	6.8 s	190 km/h (118 mph)	EPA: unknown WLTP: 276 to 336 km (171 to 209 mi)

== Marketing ==
The e-tron logo can be seen in the last scene of Iron Man 3 but the car is not revealed, probably since it wasn't publicly released as concept by then. The e-tron made an appearance in an Audi commercial tied to Avengers: Endgame, where it was introduced to Captain Marvel who was briefed about the events of Avengers: Infinity War and the things that had changed on Earth while she was gone, although it never made an appearance in the movie itself. (Note: The e-tron Sportback concept as shown at the 2017 Shanghai Motor Show, looking different from the production e-tron Sportback, made an appearance in the movie.) Later, the e-tron appeared in Spider-Man: Far From Home where it was used by characters played by Samuel L. Jackson and Cobie Smulders.

== Production issues and recall ==
Reports surfaced in April 2019 that the e-tron was subject to production delays and a cut in production targets due to supply of batteries and electric motors. Subsequently, weekly production hours at the assembly plant were foreseen to be reduced from 30 to 24. Audi announced a recall of certain e-tron models in early June 2019. The recall relates to a water leak that could lead to the high voltage electronics shorting, potentially causing a fire in extreme cases.

== Markets ==
=== Asia-Pacific ===
==== India ====
The facelifted Q8 e-tron and Q8 Sportback e-tron was launched in India on 18 August 2023.

==== Australia ====
The e-tron and e-tron Sportback were launched in Australia in June 2020.

==== Pakistan ====
The e-tron was launched in Pakistan in March 2020. It is the best selling electric car in Pakistan and Audi's most successful car in Pakistan. It was offered in standard body styling as well as the Sportback model.

==== Thailand ====
The e-tron will be launched in Thailand by Meister Technik in 2019. On 15 October 2020, the e-tron Sportback will be introduced as well.

==== Malaysia ====
The Q8 e-tron was introduced in Malaysia on 17 May 2023. It was offered in advanced 50 quattro spec. On 16 June 2023, the Q8 e-tron was later launched along with the S line 55 quattro spec. The Sportback version was also launched as well, with two variants (50 quattro and 55 quattro).

=== North America ===
==== Canada ====
The e-tron went on sale in Canada in late 2019.

==== Mexico ====
The e-tron was launched in Mexico for the 2021 model year.

==== United States ====
Deliveries to American customers started in early 2019. There were 3,540 e-trons registered in the United States during the first three quarters of 2019, ahead of Germany (2,997 units), though still less than in Norway (3,824 units).

== Sales ==
Year	China	US		
Year	China	e-tron	Sportback e-tron	Total
2023	1,481	8,180	2,907	11,087
2024	529	5,978	1,958	7,936
2025	215	642	227	869
