= Ford Bronco Sport =

Compact crossover SUV

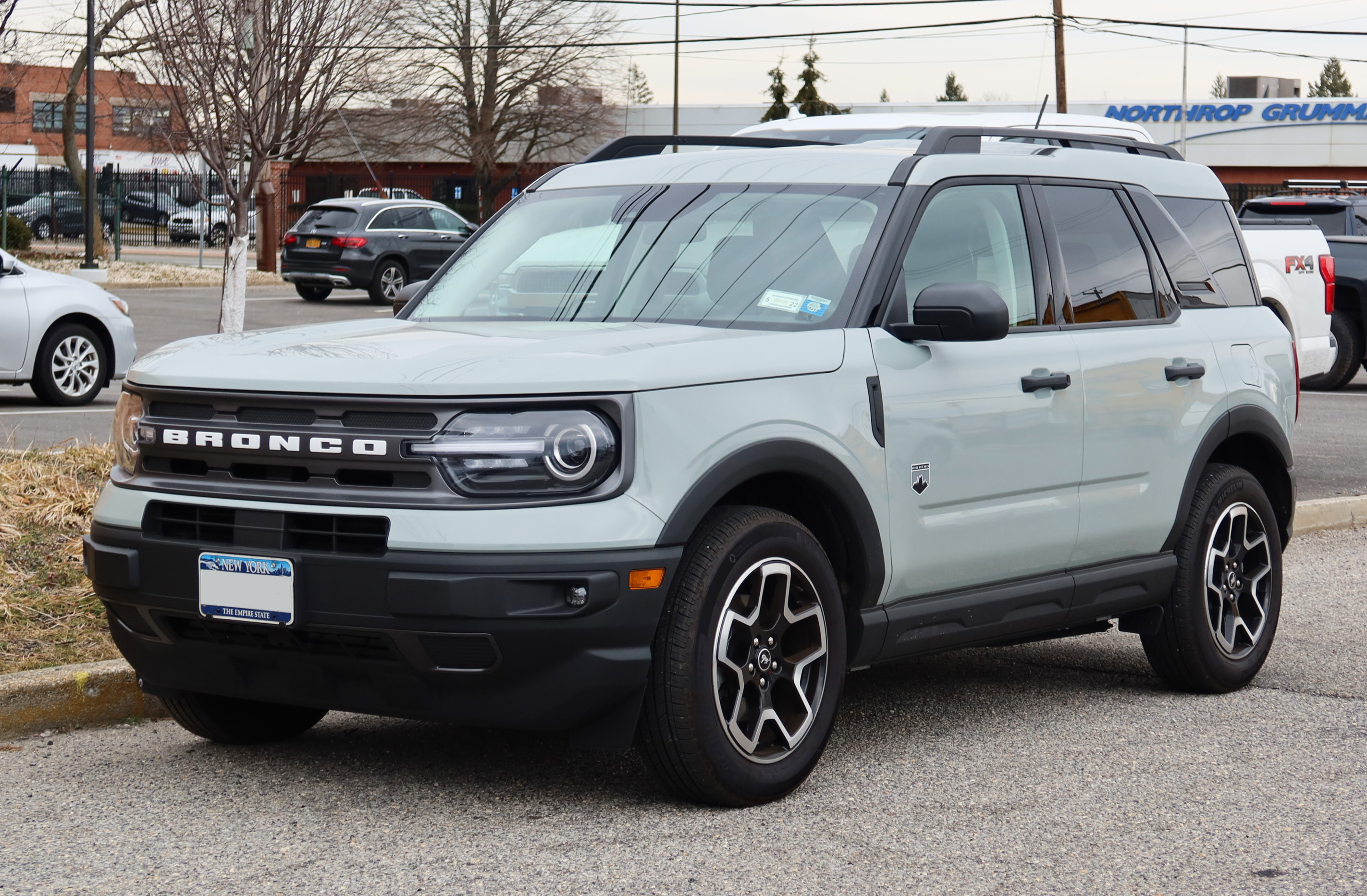
- 2021 Ford Bronco Sport Big Bend

Overview
- Manufacturer: Ford Motor Company
- Model code: CX430
- Production: October 2020 – present
- Model years: 2021–present
- Assembly: Mexico: Hermosillo, Sonora (Hermosillo Stamping and Assembly)
- Designer: Paul Wraith

Body and chassis
- Class: Compact crossover SUV
- Body style: 5-door SUV
- Layout: Front-engine, all-wheel-drive
- Platform: Ford C2
- Chassis: Unibody
- Related: Ford Maverick; Ford Escape (fourth generation); Ford Focus (fourth generation); Lincoln Corsair

Powertrain
- Engine: Gasoline: 1.5 L Ecoboost I3 turbo; 2.0 L Ecoboost I4 turbo
- Power output: 181 hp (184 PS; 135 kW) (1.5); 245 hp (248 PS; 183 kW) (2.0)
- Transmission: 8-speed 8F35 SelectShift automatic

Dimensions
- Wheelbase: 105.1 in (2,670 mm)
- Length: 172.7 in (4,387 mm)
- Width: 74.3 in (1,887 mm)
- Height: 70.3–71.4 in (1,786–1,814 mm)
- Curb weight: 3,467–3,707 lb (1,573–1,681 kg)

The Ford Bronco Sport is a compact crossover SUV sold by the Ford Motor Company and marketed under the Ford Bronco nameplate. It was released alongside the sixth generation Bronco body-on-frame SUV, featuring a similar retro and off-road styling in a smaller footprint. The vehicle is based on the front-wheel drive-based, unibody C2 platform, which is also used by the Ford Escape crossover and Maverick pickup.

== Powertrain ==
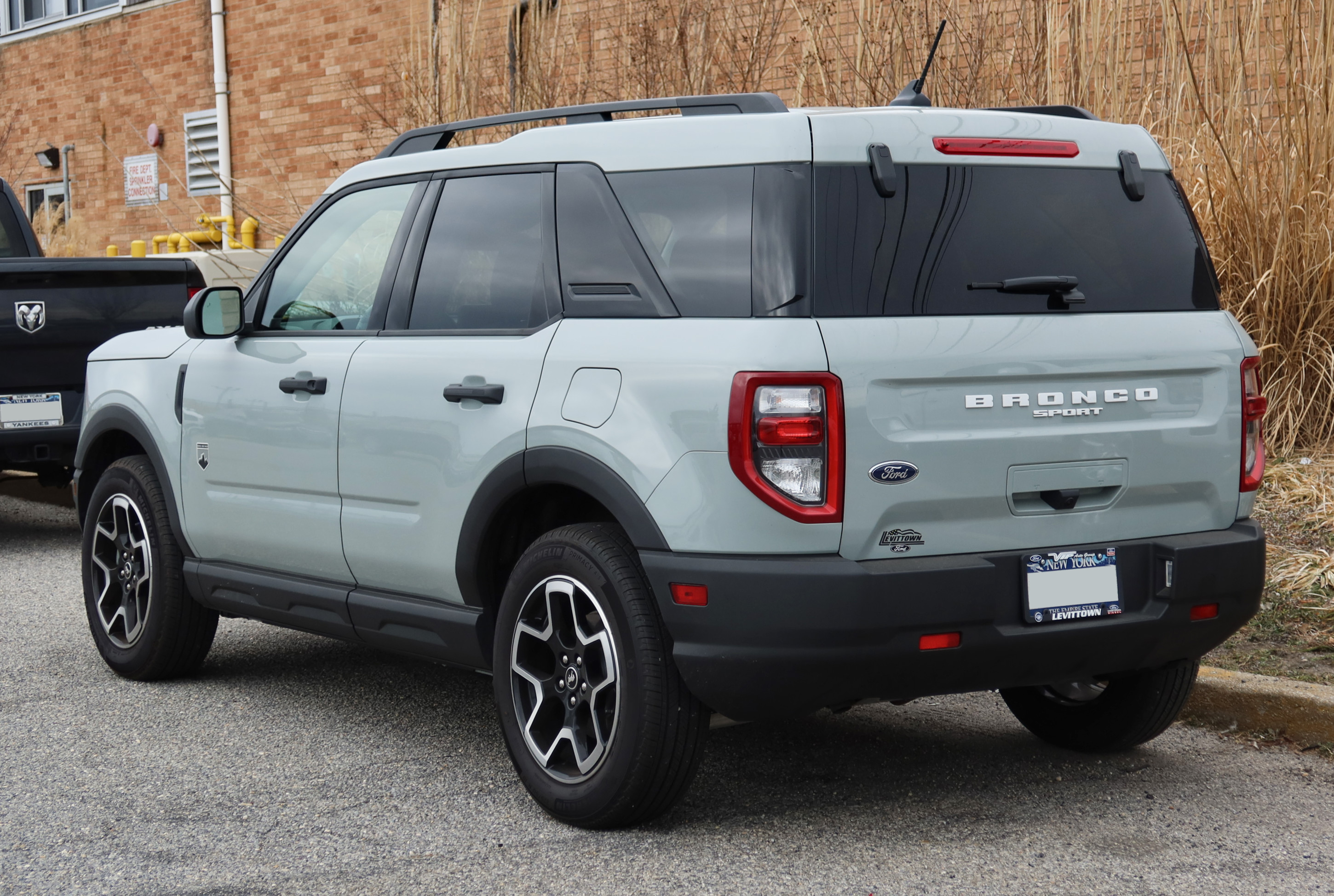
Rear view

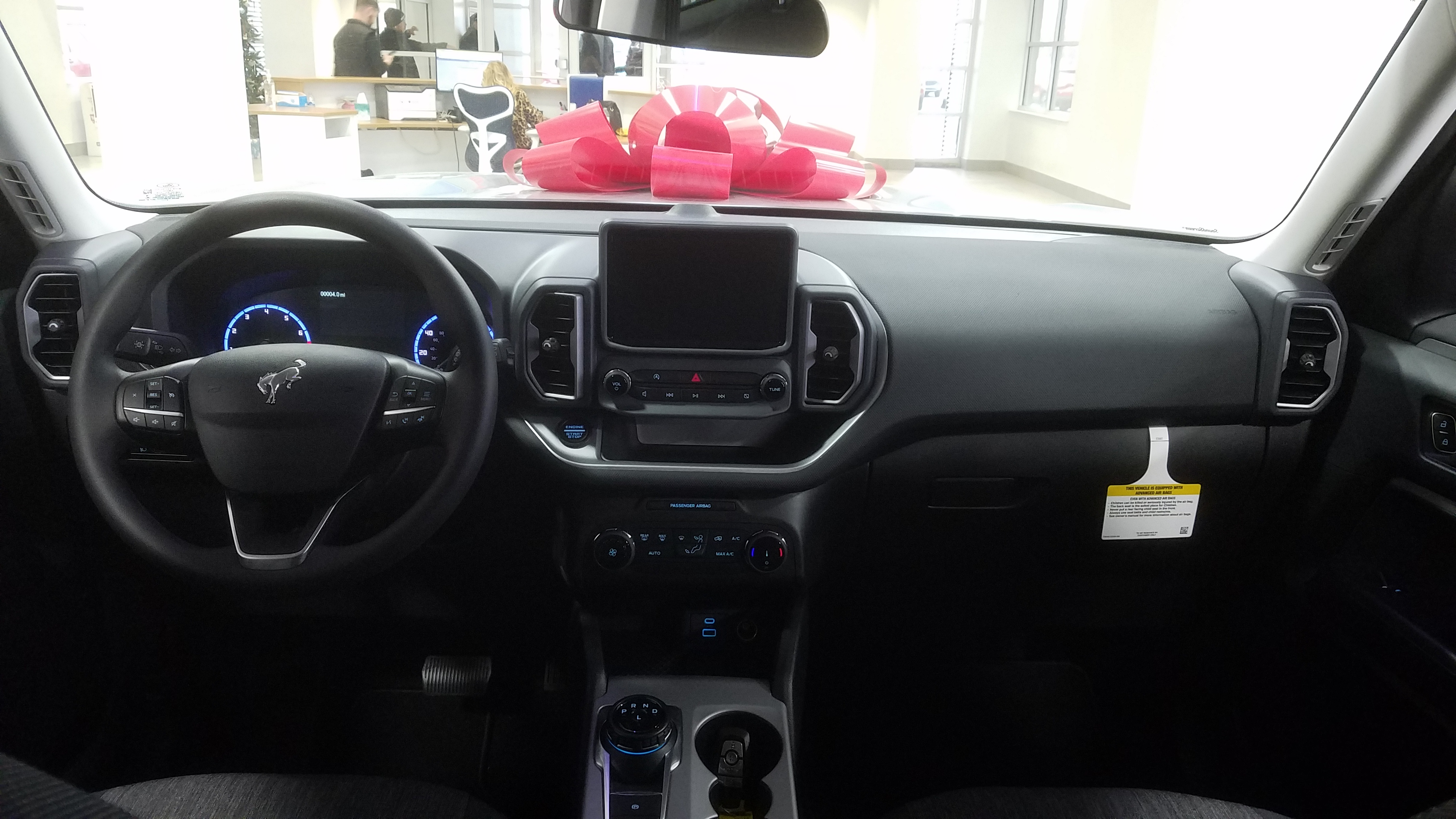
Interior

=== Engine ===
The Bronco Sport has two engine options. The base engine is a turbocharged 1.5-liter Ecoboost I3 engine producing 181 hp (184 PS; 135 kW) at 6,000 rpm, and 190 lb⋅ft (258 N⋅m; 26.3 kg⋅m) of torque at 3,000 rpm. It is also available with a turbocharged 2.0-liter Ecoboost I4 engine producing 245 hp (248 PS; 183 kW) at 6,000 rpm, and 275 lb⋅ft (373 N⋅m; 38.0 kg⋅m) of torque at 3,000 rpm. Both engines are mated to an 8-speed automatic transmission.

=== 4x4 drive system ===
The Bronco Sport comes equipped with an all-wheel drive system with "G.O.A.T. Modes" (Goes Over Any Terrain). The G.O.A.T. modes allow the driver to select different terrains for the 4x4 system. The Bronco Sport has four-wheel independent suspension. Only the Badlands model has a twin-clutch rear differential that can act as a rear differential locker and has torque vectoring. Unlike the Bronco, the Bronco Sport does not have a low-range transfer case. Instead of having traditional front bump stops, the Badlands model Bronco Sport has hydraulic bump stops. The Base, Big Bend, and Outer Banks models share the same AWD system as the Escape, with proprietary programming for off-road use. The Bronco Sport has the tow capability of 2,200–2,700 lb (998–1,225 kg) depending on the engine.

== Trims ==
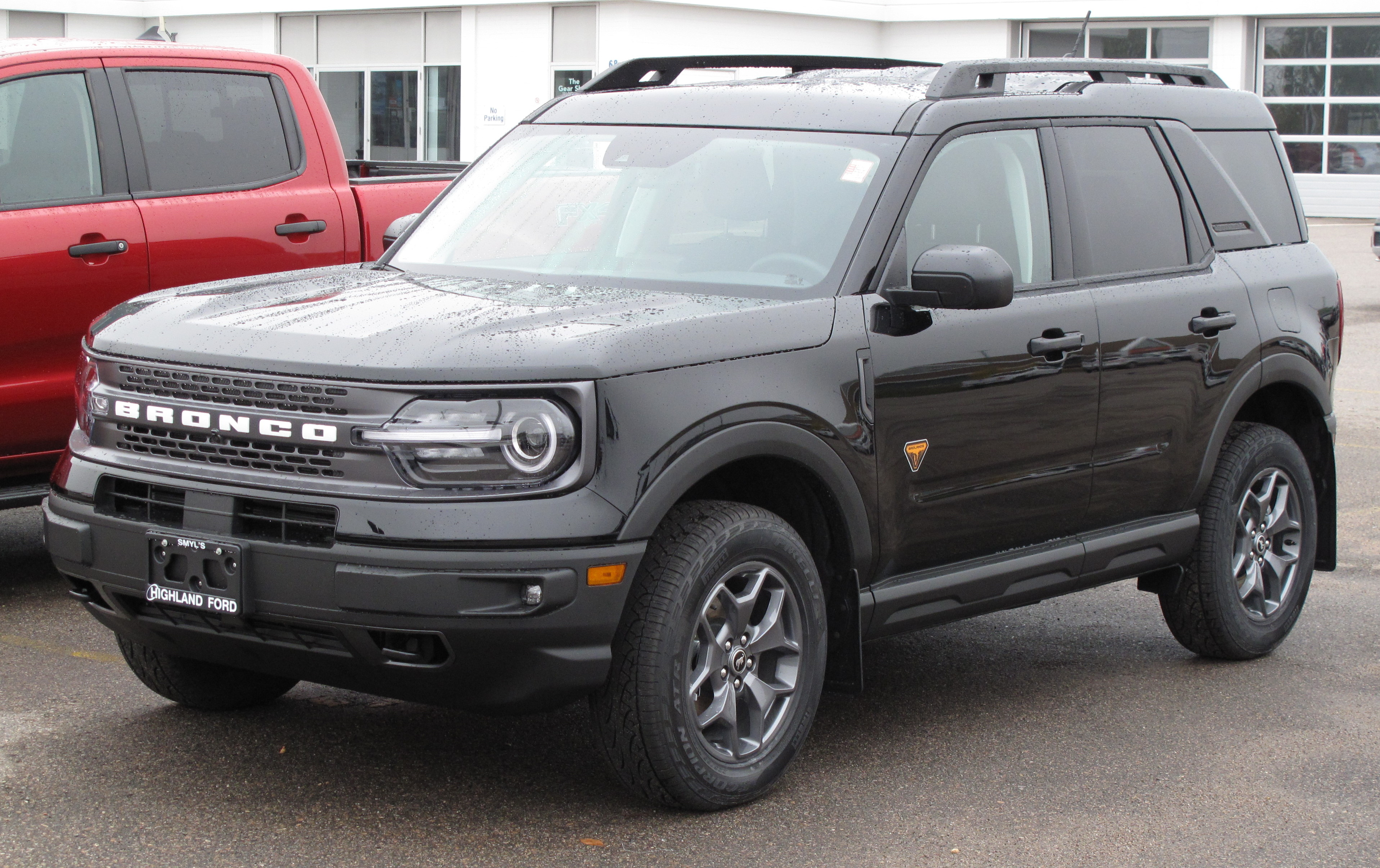
Bronco Sport Badlands

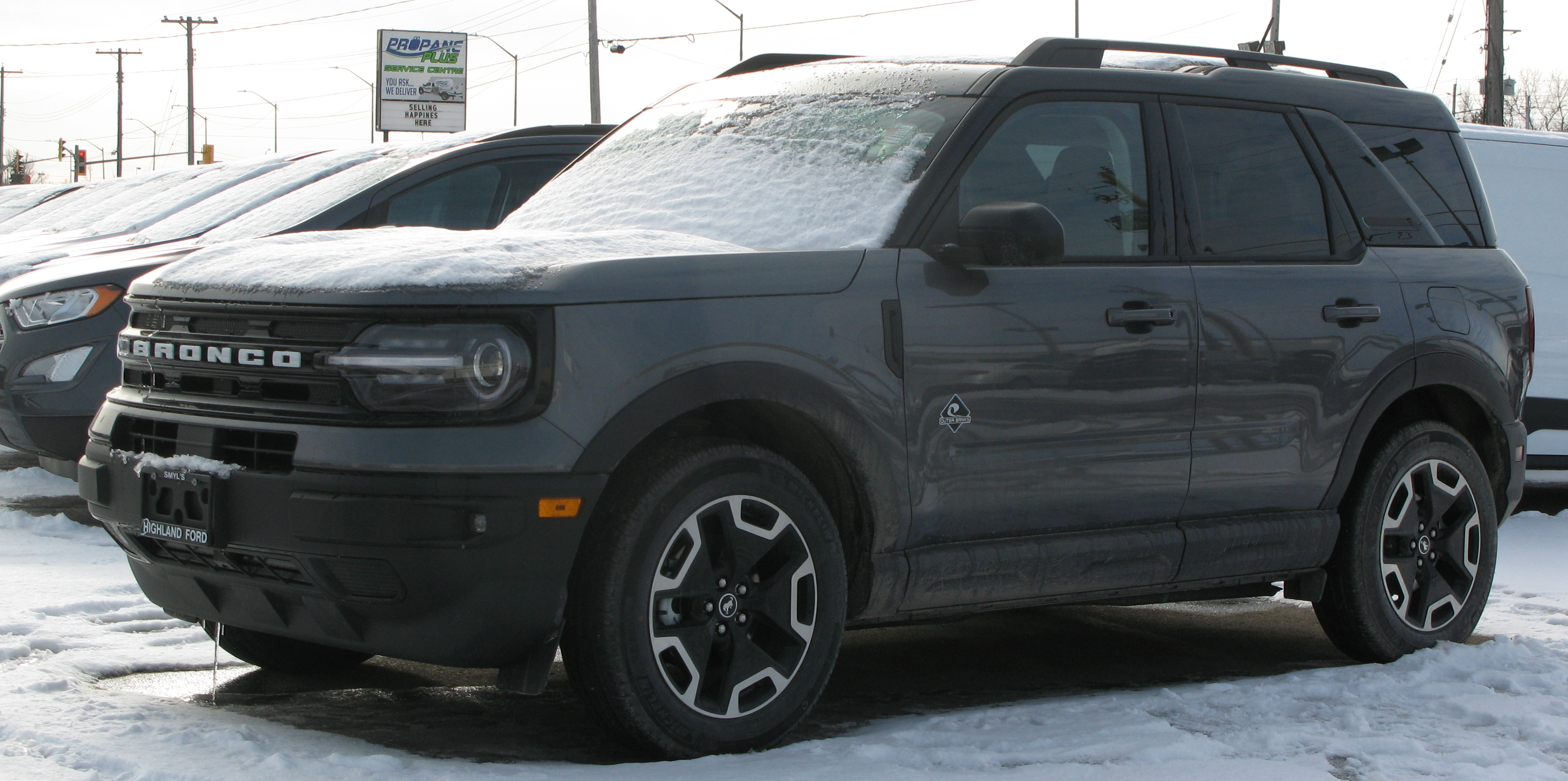
Bronco Sport Outer Banks

For launch, the Bronco Sport was available in five trims, but the First Edition trim was limited to only 2,000 units. All trims came standard with G.O.A.T mode, a flip-up rear glass and rear flood lights in the tailgate. The 8-inch infotainment system with SYNC 3 was standard across all trims.

Base

The Base is the entry-level trim of the Bronco Sport lineup. It is equipped with the 1.5-litre three-cylinder Ecoboost gasoline engine mated to a rotary-controlled eight-speed automatic transmission, aluminum-alloy wheels, the SYNC 3 touchscreen infotainment system with SiriusXM Satellite Radio (SiriusXM was deleted for the 2022 model year) and wired Apple CarPlay and Android Auto smartphone integration, cloth seating surfaces, a six-speaker audio system, 4.2-inch full-color LCD instrument cluster display screen and Ford's proprietary door-mounted keypad system, marketed as its Securicode.

Big Bend

The Big Bend trim level is the mid-level model of the Bronco Sport lineup. It adds convenience features onto the Base trim, such as SiriusXM Satellite Radio (starting with the 2022 model year), a keyless access system with a push-button ignition, a MOLLE Strap System, and a rear seat back protector.

Outer Banks

The Outer Banks trim level is the luxury-oriented model of the Bronco Sport lineup. It adds luxury amenities onto the Big Bend trim level, such as eighteen-inch tires and aluminum-alloy wheels, combination leather-and-cloth-trimmed seating surfaces, and a Shadow Black-painted front grille with white 'BRONCO' lettering.

Badlands

The Badlands trim level is the off-road oriented model of the Bronco Sport lineup. It is powered by the 2.0-litre four-cylinder Ecoboost gasoline engine mated to a rotary-controlled eight-speed automatic transmission (the Badlands is the only trim level in the Bronco Sport lineup to receive the higher-output engine), producing 250 hp (253 PS; 186 kW) and 277 lb⋅ft (376 N⋅m; 38.3 kg⋅m) of torque. The Badlands also has added features such as two additional "G.O.A.T. Modes" for the four wheel drive system and all-terrain tires and unique aluminum-alloy wheels onto the mid-level Big Bend trim level.

First Edition

The First Edition trim level, only available for the 2021 model year, was based on the off-road oriented Badlands trim, and included almost all of its available options and packages (such as luxury leather-trimmed seating surfaces, dual heated front bucket seats, and a Bang and Olufsen premium amplified audio system). Ford's CoPilot 360 Assist+ was the only available option not offered on the First Edition. Production was limited to 2,000 units.

Heritage Edition

The Heritage Edition trim level, only available beginning with the 2023 model year, and was based on the Big Bend trim. Several options are exclusive to the Heritage Edition trim and in honor of the original 1966 Bronco.

Heritage Limited Edition

The Heritage Limited Edition trim level, only available to the 2023 model year, and was based on the off-road oriented Badlands trim, and includes almost all available options and packages. Several options are exclusive to the Heritage Limited Edition trim and in honor of the original 1966 Bronco, this retro production was limited to 1,966 units.

Along with the regular options, Ford is also offering bundles on all trims with certain accessories. The four bundles offered are: Bike, Camp, Snow, and Water.

== Safety ==
The 2022 Bronco Sport was awarded the "Top Safety Pick +" by the Insurance Institute for Highway Safety.

IIHS scores
Small overlap front (Driver)	Good	
Small overlap front (Passenger)	Good	
Moderate overlap front	Good	
Side (original test)	Good	
Roof strength	Good	
Head restraints and seats	Good	
Headlights	Good	
Front crash prevention (Vehicle-to-Vehicle)	Superior	optional
Front crash prevention (Vehicle-to-Vehicle)	Superior	standard
Front crash prevention (Vehicle-to-Pedestrian, day)	Superior	optional
Front crash prevention (Vehicle-to-Pedestrian, day)	Superior	standard
Child seat anchors (LATCH) ease of use	Acceptable	

== Sales ==
Year	U.S.	Canada	Mexico	Brazil	China
2020	5,120	195	144	—N/a	
2021	108,169	11,094	4,193	1,053	
2022	99,547	11,958	3,443	1,575	
2023	127,476		3,329	1,157	1,139
2024	124,701	18,924	2,539	2,281	602
2025	134,493	21,839			150
