= Ford Maverick (2022) =

Compact pick-up truck

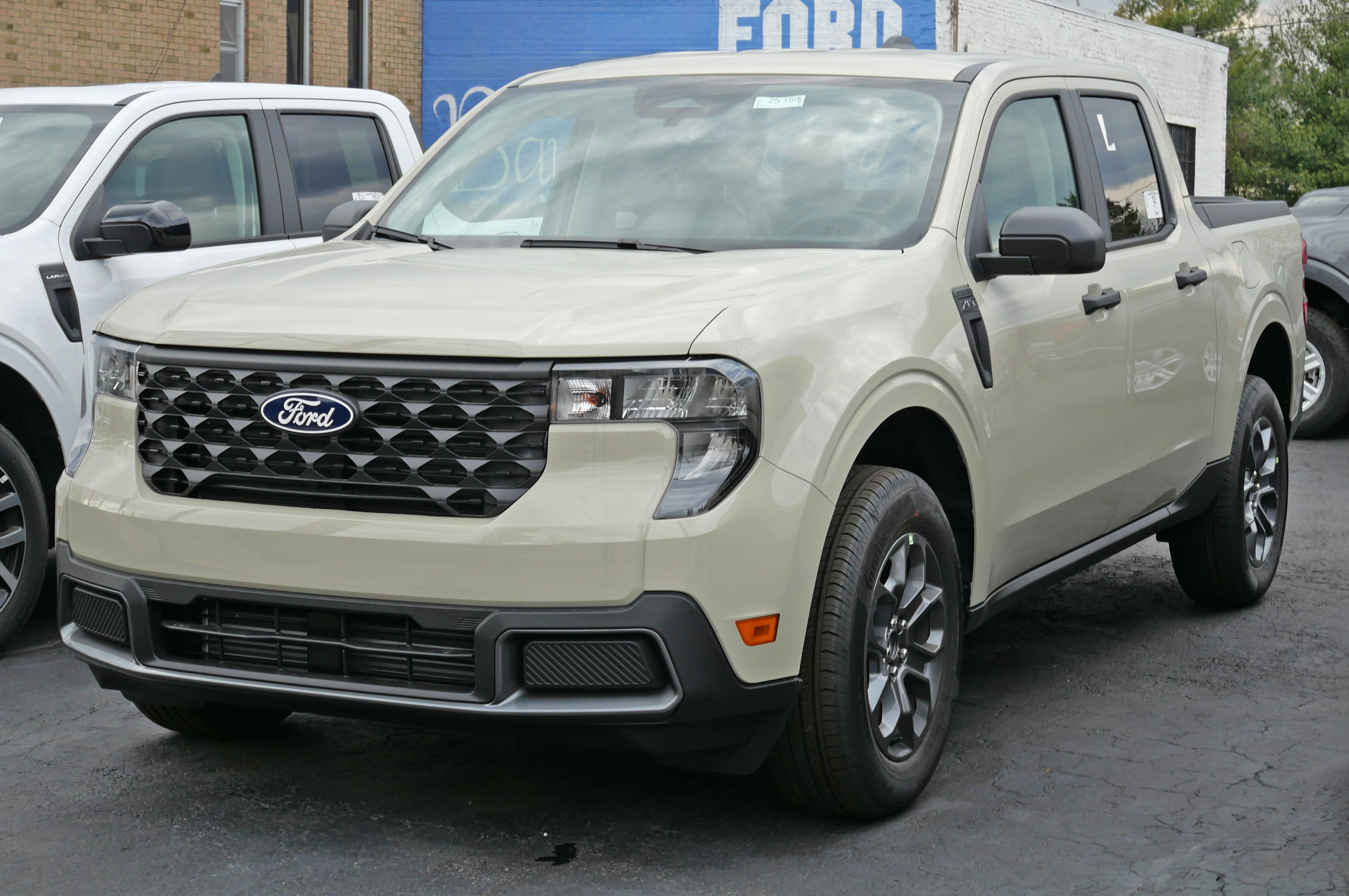
- Ford Maverick 2025 photographed in the United States

Overview
- Manufacturer: Ford Motor Company
- Model code: P758
- Production: 2021–present
- Model years: 2022–present
- Assembly: Mexico: Hermosillo (Hermosillo Stamping and Assembly)
- Designer: Heath Hilliard (exterior); Scott Anderson (interior); Rob Brancheau (color and materials)

Body and chassis
- Class: Compact pickup truck
- Body style: 4-door pickup truck
- Layout: Front-engine, front-wheel-drive; Front-engine, all-wheel-drive (EcoBoost only from 2022 to 2024)
- Platform: Ford C2
- Chassis: Unibody
- Related: Ford Bronco Sport; Ford Escape; Ford Focus; Lincoln Corsair

Powertrain
- Engine: Gasoline: 2.0 L EcoBoost turbo I4; Gasoline Hybrid: 2.5 L iVCT Atkinson-cycle I4
- Electric motor: 88 kW (118 hp) permanent-magnet synchronous AC (hybrid)
- Power output: 191–250 hp (142–186 kW)
- Transmission: Ford HF45 (hybrid); Ford 8-speed 8F35 automatic (turbo); Ford Quick Shift 7-speed 8F35 automatic (Lobo AWD)
- Hybrid drivetrain: Parallel hybrid
- Battery: 1.1 kWh lithium-ion (hybrid)

Dimensions
- Wheelbase: 121.1 in (3,076 mm)
- Length: 199.7 in (5,072 mm); 200.7 in (5,098 mm) (Tremor)
- Width: 72.6 in (1,844 mm)
- Height: 68.7 in (1,745 mm); 69.5 in (1,765 mm) (Tremor)
- Curb weight: 3,674 lb (1,666 kg); 3,807 lb (1,727 kg) (Tremor)

The Ford Maverick is a four-door, compact pickup truck manufactured and marketed by the Ford Motor Company. Ford unveiled the Maverick on June 8, 2021, as its smallest truck, below the mid-size Ford Ranger.

Using a front-wheel drive-based unibody platform shared with the Ford Escape and Bronco Sport, the pickup's power train offerings include a gasoline hybrid engine or a turbocharged gasoline engine, both available in all-wheel drive (starting with the 2025 model year). The truck is exclusively offered in a 4-door crew cab configuration with a short bed.

The Maverick went on sale in late 2021 for the 2022 model year. The truck saw strong demand from consumers, with Ford unable to fulfill all orders it received for the 2022 model year, and only accepting orders for the 2023 model year for one week. The truck has been successful in attracting new customers, with Ford reporting that nearly 60% of Maverick buyers are new to the brand.

Demand remains strong through mid 2025, with 48,041 trucks sold during the second quarter alone, an increase of 26.3% year over year. In contrast, sales of its primary competitor, the Hyundai Santa Cruz, dropped by 21%. By the end of 2025 yearly sales figures neared 155,000, and automotive reporting noted the Maverick had "outperformed everyone's expectations."

== Background ==
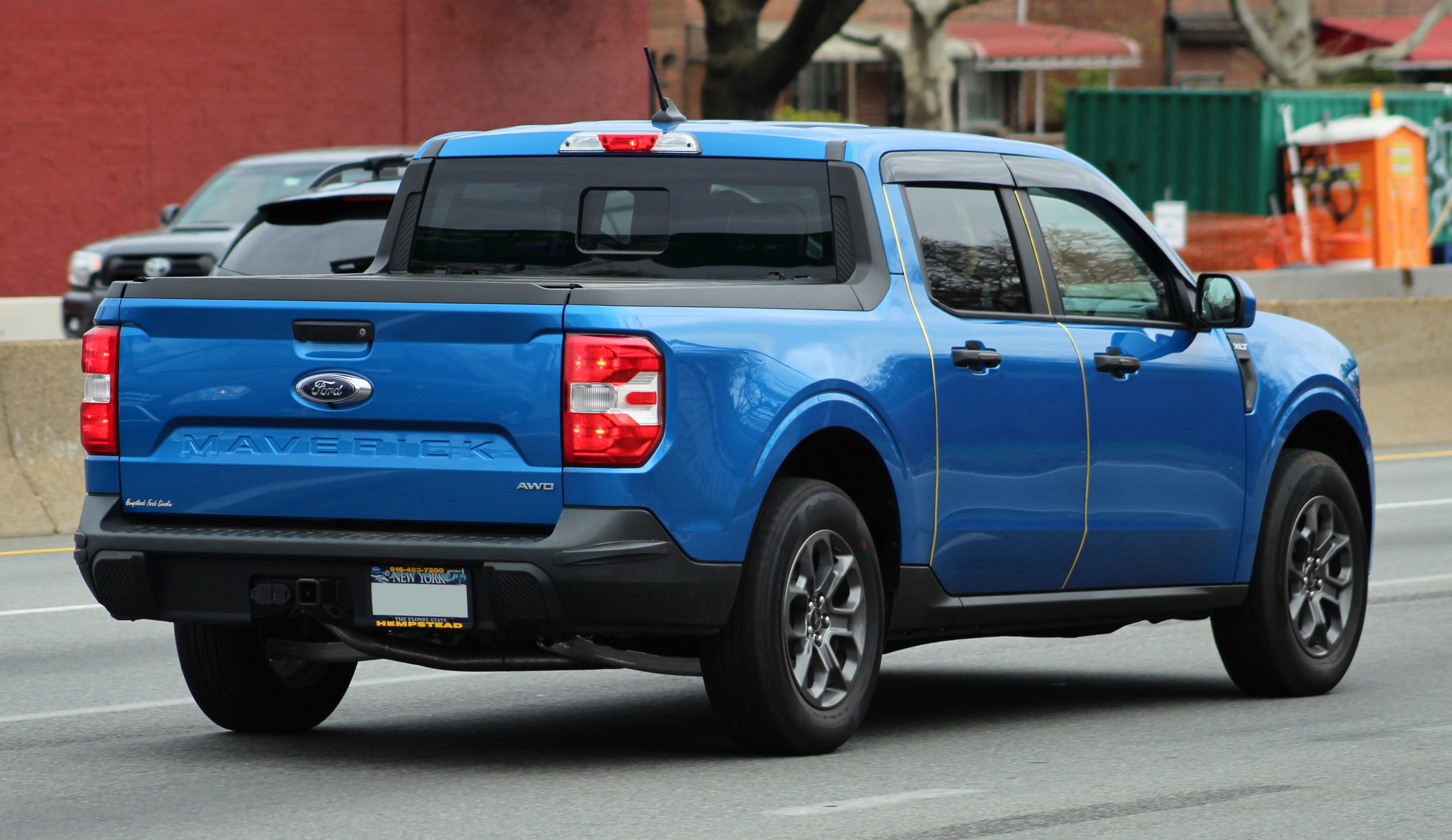
Rear view

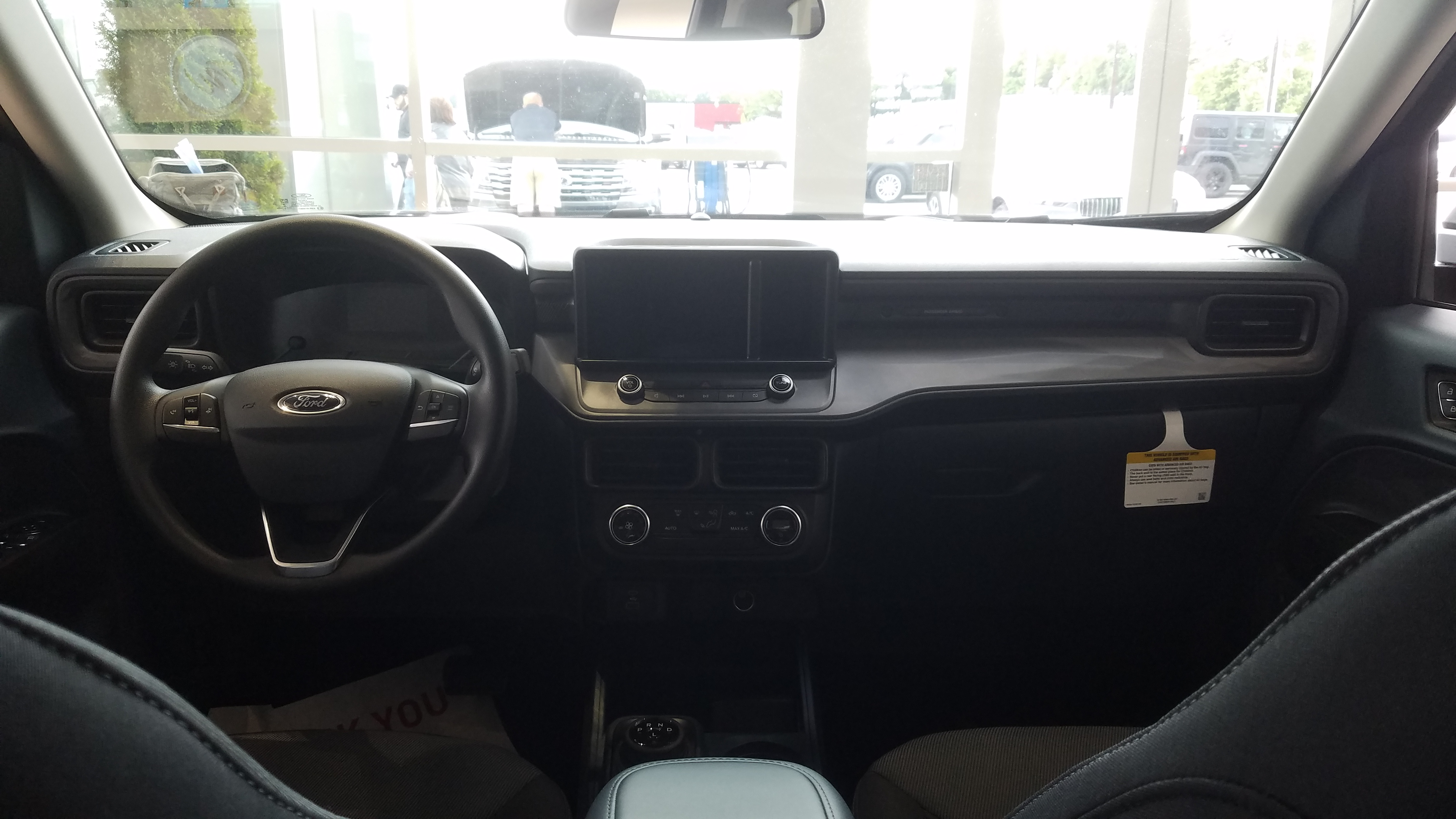
Interior

Ford announced plans to launch a compact pickup truck based on Ford's C2 platform used by the Ford Focus in January 2019, as well as the Bronco Sport and Ford Escape compact crossover SUV.

The front end and front floor structures are common to the Focus, Escape, and Bronco sport as well as the Lincoln Corsair compact luxury SUV.

Bumper beams, front rails, aprons, and shock towers as well as the dashboard are shared with the Bronco Sport which is also made at the same Hermosillo assembly facility.

The Maverick does have an increased wheelbase and front track width over other vehicles based on the C2 platform in allow for more cab space according to Chief Program Engineer Samir Raval. The truck uses a common frame that allows for different (all wheel vs front wheel drive) rear suspensions.

In July 2020, a tailgate photo leaked to the press, confirming the truck would use the Maverick name, previously used on Ford's compact passenger car (1970–1979). Ford noted the name was not selected to recall the earlier passenger car, but was found to resonate with younger, active customers.

The Maverick is manufactured at Ford's Hermosillo Assembly in Mexico alongside the Bronco Sport for both the North and South American auto markets. Production began on September 2, 2021.

In January 2022, Ford suspended customer orders due to a backlog in vehicle production. The company told dealers it intended to resume taking orders for the 2023 model later in the year. The strong demand for the Maverick was said to indicate consumer support for a more affordable pickup truck.

Marketed as Flexbed, the cargo area features a load length of 4.5 feet (1.4 m), (accommodating 4'x8' sheets with the tailgate lowered partially, resting on the bed's wheel wells); pre-stamped slots in the bed sides to accommodate customization; and a built-in, separately fused 12-volt electrical circuit, also to accommodate customization.

== Powertrain ==
A hybrid engine with an eCVT gearbox is standard equipment on all Maverick models. A 2.5-liter iVCT Atkinson cycle inline-four gasoline engine paired with an electric motor produces a combined 191 hp (194 PS; 142 kW) at 5600 rpm. The engine produces 155 lb⋅ft (210 N⋅m; 21.4 kg⋅m) of torque at 4000 rpm, and the hybrid system produces 173 lb⋅ft (235 N⋅m; 23.9 kg⋅m) of torque.

The electric motor was designed in-house by Ford and manufactured by Toshiba, using the same footprint and transmission connections as the Ford Escape which shares the same C2 platform, reducing development time and costs.

A 2.0-liter EcoBoost twin-scroll turbocharged inline-four gasoline engine is optional. This engine produces 250 hp (253 PS; 186 kW) at 5500 rpm and 277 lb⋅ft (376 N⋅m; 38.3 kg⋅m) of torque at 3000 rpm. The EcoBoost is paired with an 8-speed automatic transmission. From the 2022-2024 model years, front-wheel drive is standard on all models, with all-wheel drive offered only with the EcoBoost engine. From the 2025 model refresh, hybrid powertrains add all-wheel-drive as an option from standard front-wheel-drive and the EcoBoost is only available with all-wheel-drive.

The Maverick can tow 2,000 lb (910 kg) standard, with an optional upgrade to 4,000 lb (1,800 kg) when equipped with the optional EcoBoost engine, all-wheel drive, and 4K Tow Package option (which includes more robust cooling for the engine and transmission, a trailer brake controller and lower axle gear ratios). For the 2025 model year, the AWD hybrid powertrain can also be optioned with the 4K Tow Package. Also, optional only on XLT AWD Ecoboost models, is an FX4 off-road package featuring additional traction control modes, hill descent control, skid plates, tow hooks and all-terrain tires.

On August 1, 2022, Ford announced a new Tremor package for 2023 Maverick AWD models at the XLT and Lariat trim levels, adding significant off-road capability to the Maverick. The package includes a twin-clutch rear drive unit with a differential lock feature taken from the Bronco Sport Badlands that can divert rear-axle torque to either wheel. It also includes a redesigned front fascia to improve the approach angle, upgraded suspension components, and a factory lift to increase ground clearance by 1" over other Maverick models, in addition to off-road features from the existing FX4 package.

All Maverick models use a rotary gear selector knob located on the center console.

In July 2023, Ford's CEO Jim Farley stated that 56% of buyers chose the hybrid power train for their Maverick instead of the standard 2.0L EcoBoost, even though the hybrid option was $1500 more expensive. Maverick remains the best selling hybrid pickup through the first half of 2025.

== Trim levels ==
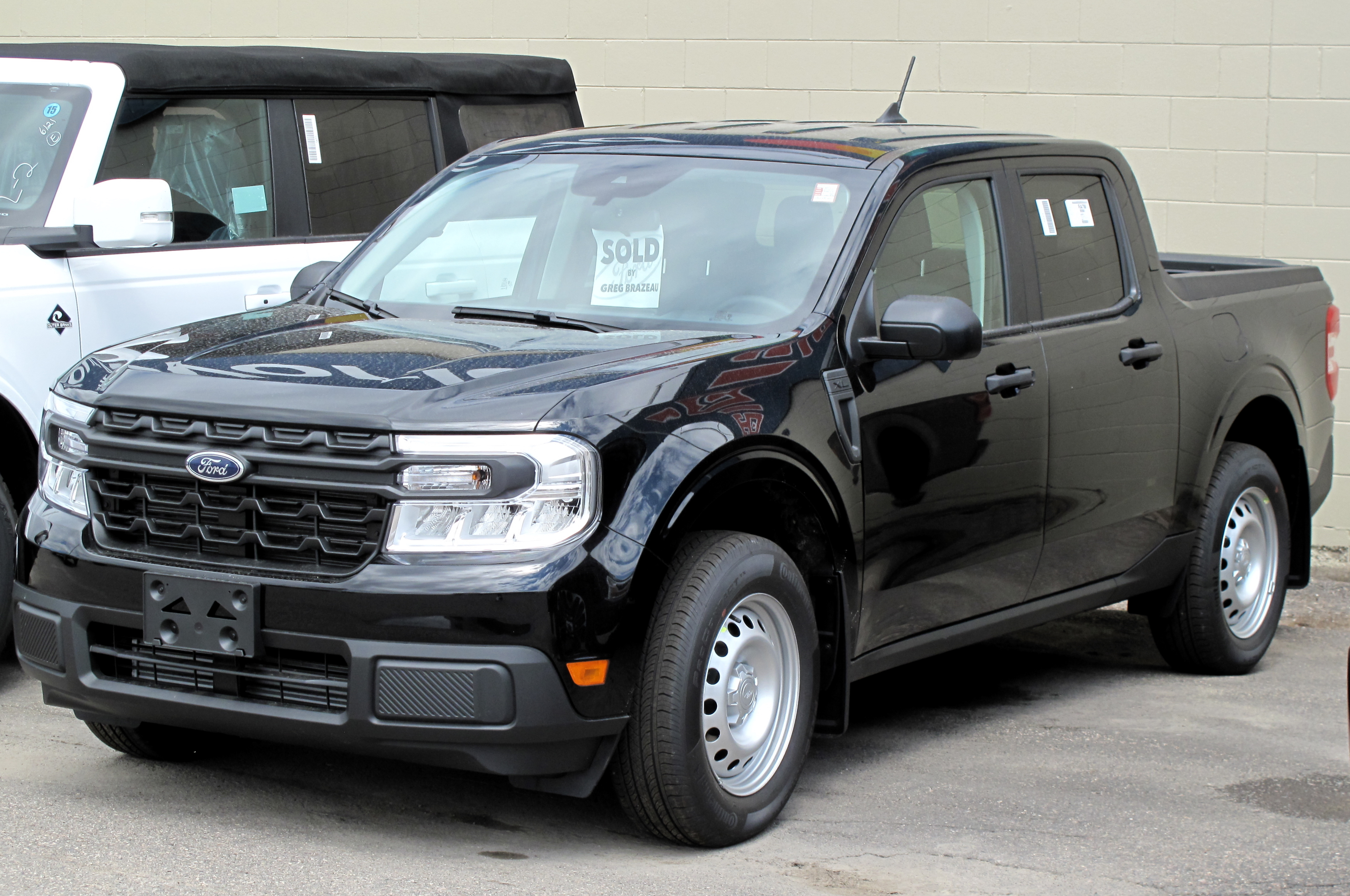
2022 Maverick XL

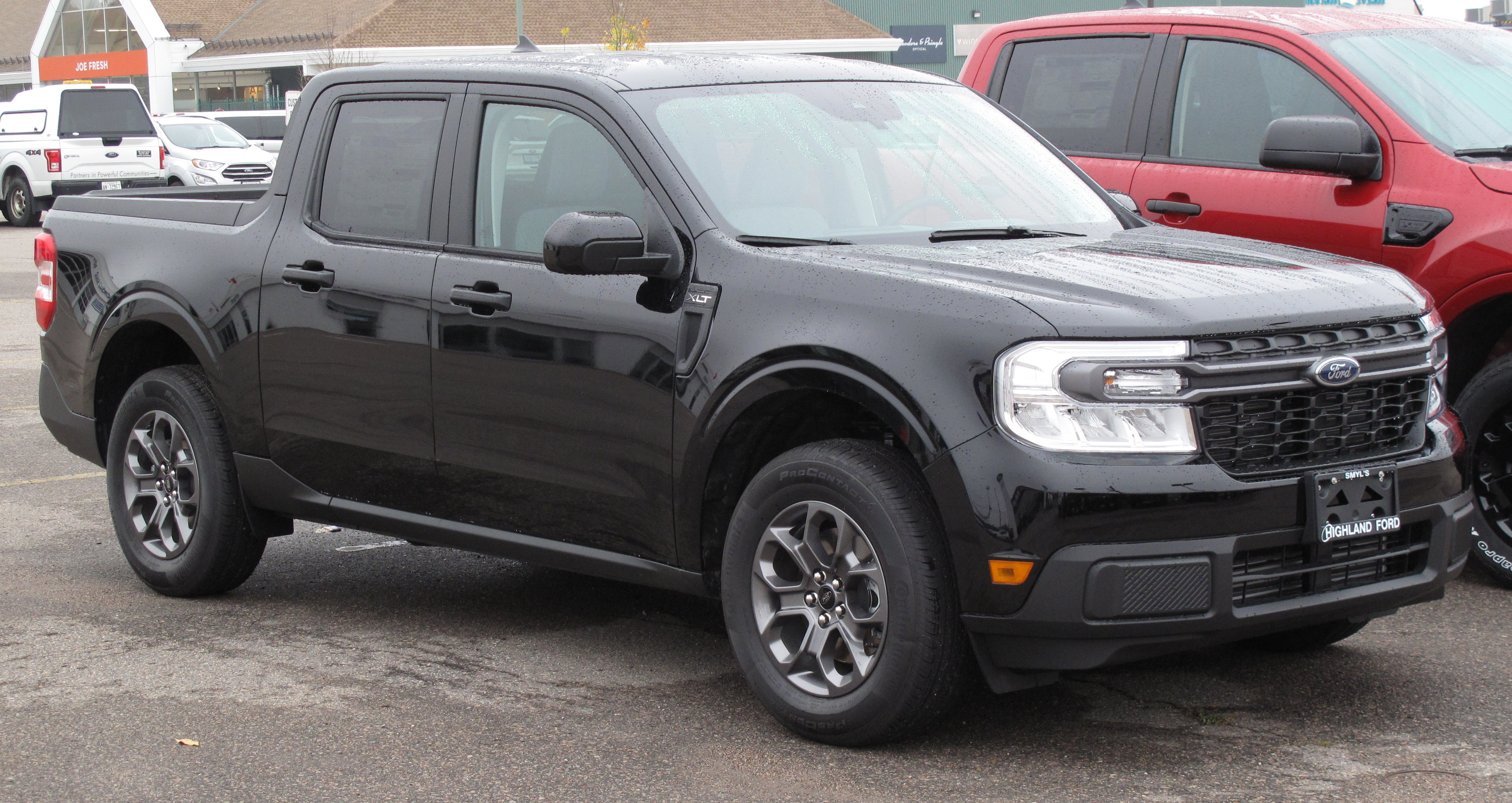
2022 Maverick XLT

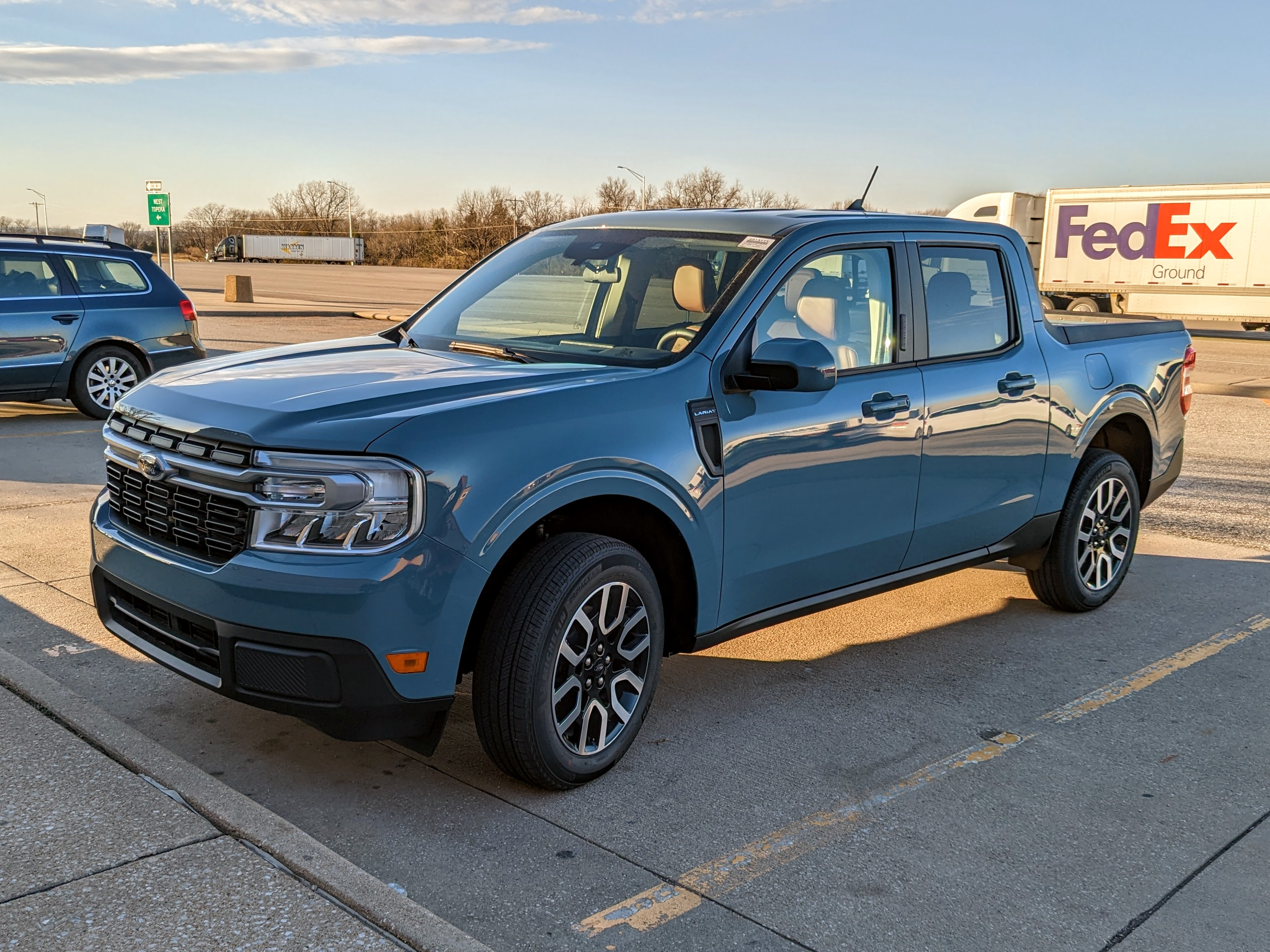
2022 Maverick Lariat

The Maverick is available in five trim levels with the same designations as all Ford trucks: base (XL), mid-level (XLT), and top-tier (Lariat) and two new trims offered in 2025, the sport truck themed LOBO, and the now stand-alone off-road packaged Tremor.

Front-wheel drive is standard on all models, and all-wheel-drive is an available option on the 2.0L EcoBoost gasoline engine and, as of 2025, the 2.5L hybrid engine as well.

Standard equipment on all trim levels includes a touchscreen infotainment system with wired Apple CarPlay and Android Auto smartphone integration and 4G LTE capability, a rear-view camera, pre-collision assist with automatic emergency braking, power windows and door locks, remote keyless entry, auto-on headlamps and auto high-beams, a multi-function steering wheel, and air conditioning. Options available on all models include a power/tilt moonroof and the Ford CoPilot360 suite of driver assistance technologies.

The base (XL) trim comes with silver-painted steel wheels, black exterior trim, a six-speaker audio system, and cloth seating surfaces. Notably, cruise control and power mirrors were not available as options on the 2022 base (XL) model. Cruise became a standard feature for 2023.

The mid-level (XLT) trim adds features to the base trim, including cruise control, power mirrors, aluminum-alloy wheels, color-keyed exterior trim, higher-grade cloth seating and interior trim, a larger (4.2") full-color LCD instrument cluster display, and remote start. An optional package adds heated and power-adjustable seats, a leather-wrapped steering wheel and other features to the mid-level trim.

The top-tier (Lariat) trim adds features to the mid-level trim, including ActiveX faux leather-trimmed seating surfaces and leather-wrapped steering wheel, heated front bucket seats, powered seat adjustments, push-button ignition, a powered sliding rear window and others. Optional features available as part of the luxury package only on the top-tier trim level include adaptive cruise control, a Bang & Olufsen premium amplified audio system, and SiriusXM satellite radio.

A First Edition Package was available at launch based on the top-tier trim with options, including the 2.0L EcoBoost engine and eight-speed automatic transmission. It featured unique aluminum-alloy wheels and painted exterior trim. It was only available for a limited number of units in the 2022 model year.

== 2025 refresh ==
The refreshed Maverick was unveiled on July 31, 2024, as a 2025 model year vehicle. Changes include a new front fascia with new headlights (in the shape of number '7'), the interior receives a new 13.2" touchscreen using Sync 4 software with wireless Apple CarPlay and Android Auto smartphone integration and 5G LTE connectivity, the option of a 360-degree camera system, the addition of Pro Trailer Backup Assist and Pro Trailer Hitch Assist features (as a late 2025 build option), and the AWD and 4K Tow options became available on the Hybrid models for the first time.

The facelift brings the introduction of the Lobo trim, which features dual-piston front caliper for the braking system, a sports-tuned suspension lowered by 0.5 in (13 mm) and 1.12 in (28 mm) front and rear, respectively, a retuned AWD system with a Lobo mode that activates torque vectoring, a sportier exterior design with black painted trim and 19" black colored turbofan-styled alloy wheels. The interior receives a few differences such as exclusive seat badging. The Lobo is powered by the 2.0L EcoBoost I4.

The 2.0-liter EcoBoost engine found across the trim levels gets significant updates from Ford's new Modular Power Cylinder (MPC) EcoBoost platform as well as the addition of port injection alongside direct injection (PFDI). Despite the updates, the Ecoboost engine's power specs remain unchanged from 2024. The standard transmission for the EcoBoost is still the 8F35 8-speed automatic and the Lobo AWD trim offers a reprogrammed Quick Shift transmission which operates as a 7-speed by skipping second gear. The 2.5L hybrid powertrain and eCVT transmission remain unchanged in architecture and specs.

2025 also saw the implementation of the Tremor as its own distinct trim. Previously, it was a package added onto the XLT and Lariat trims.

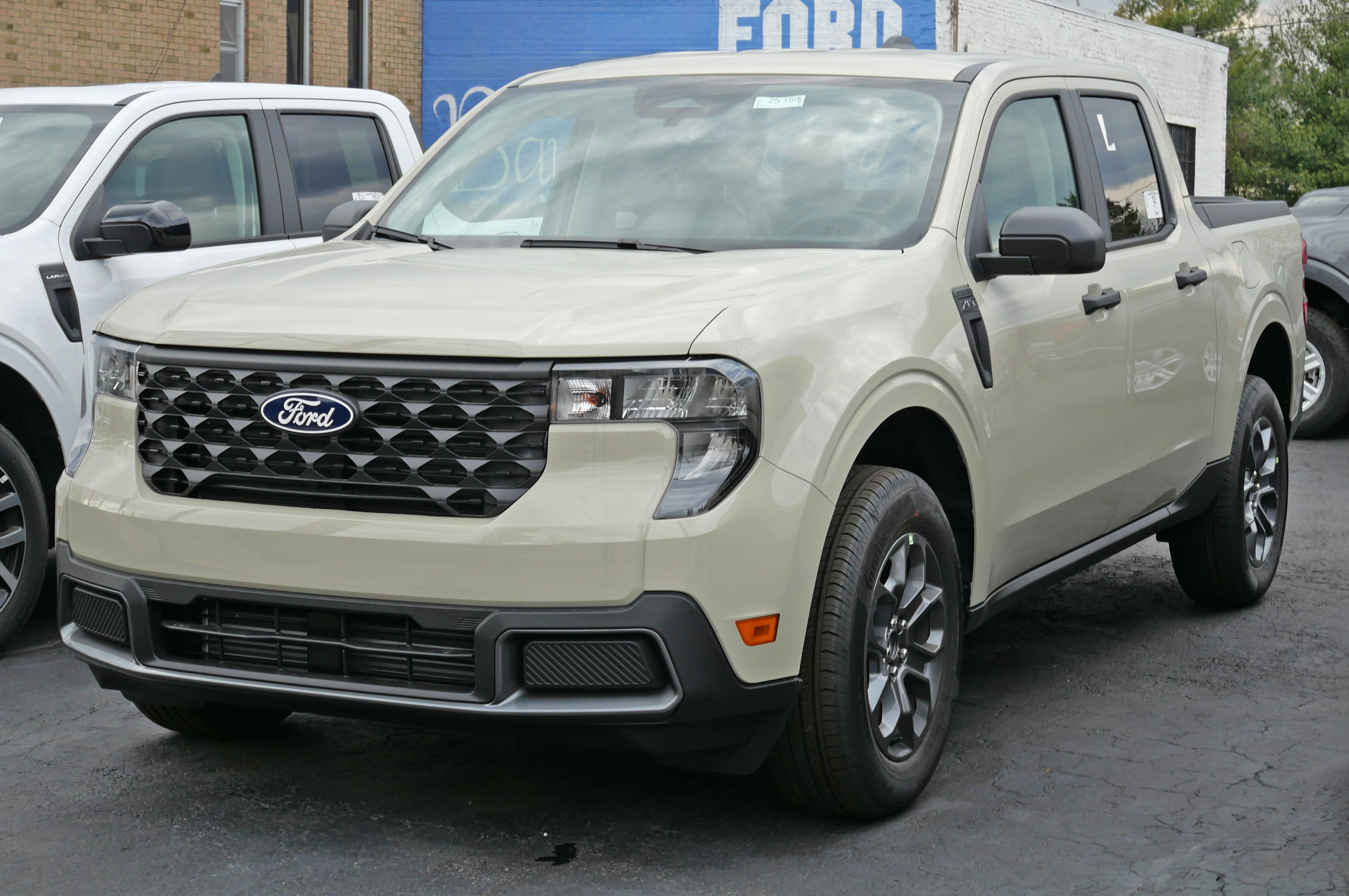
2025 Maverick XLT

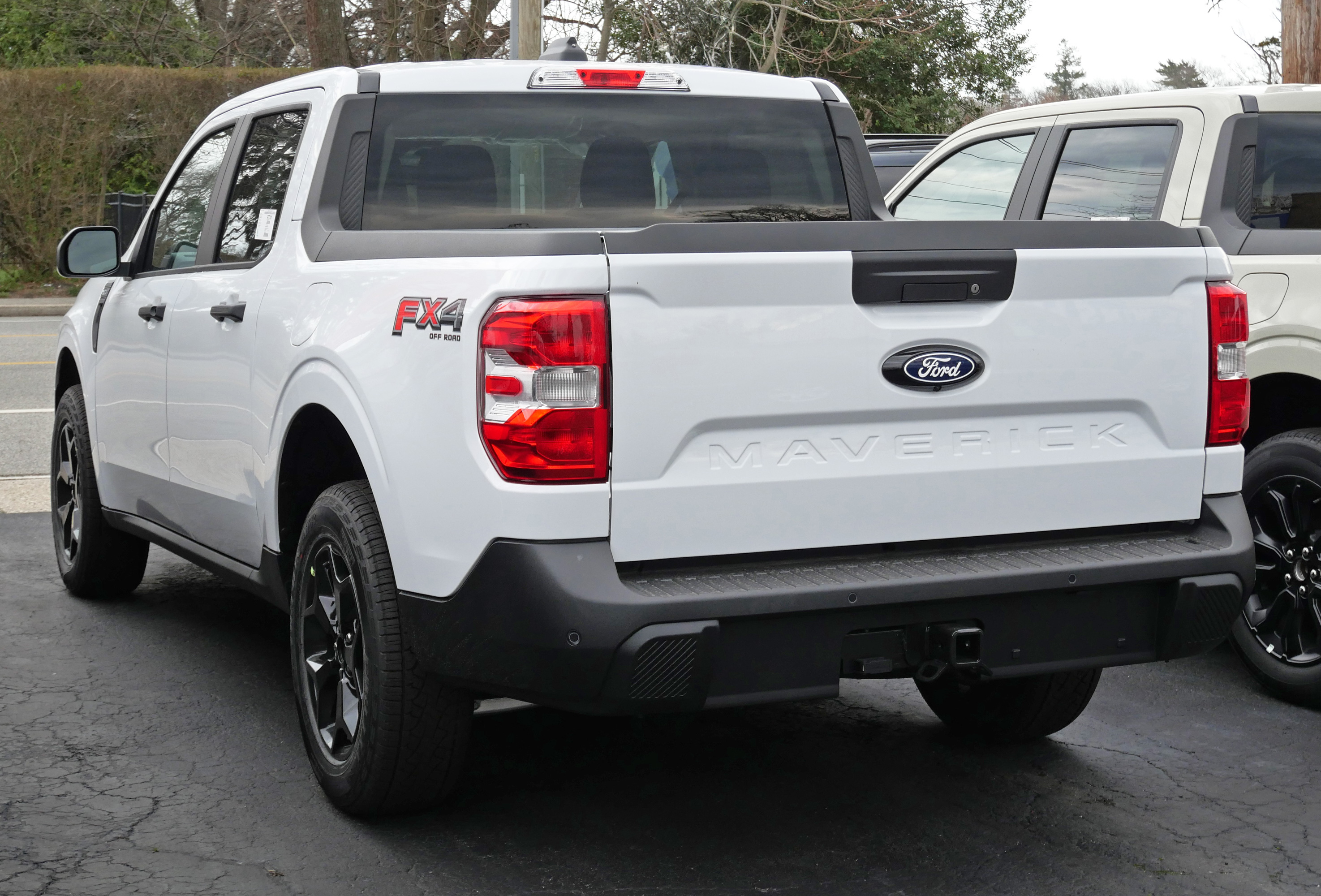
Rear view

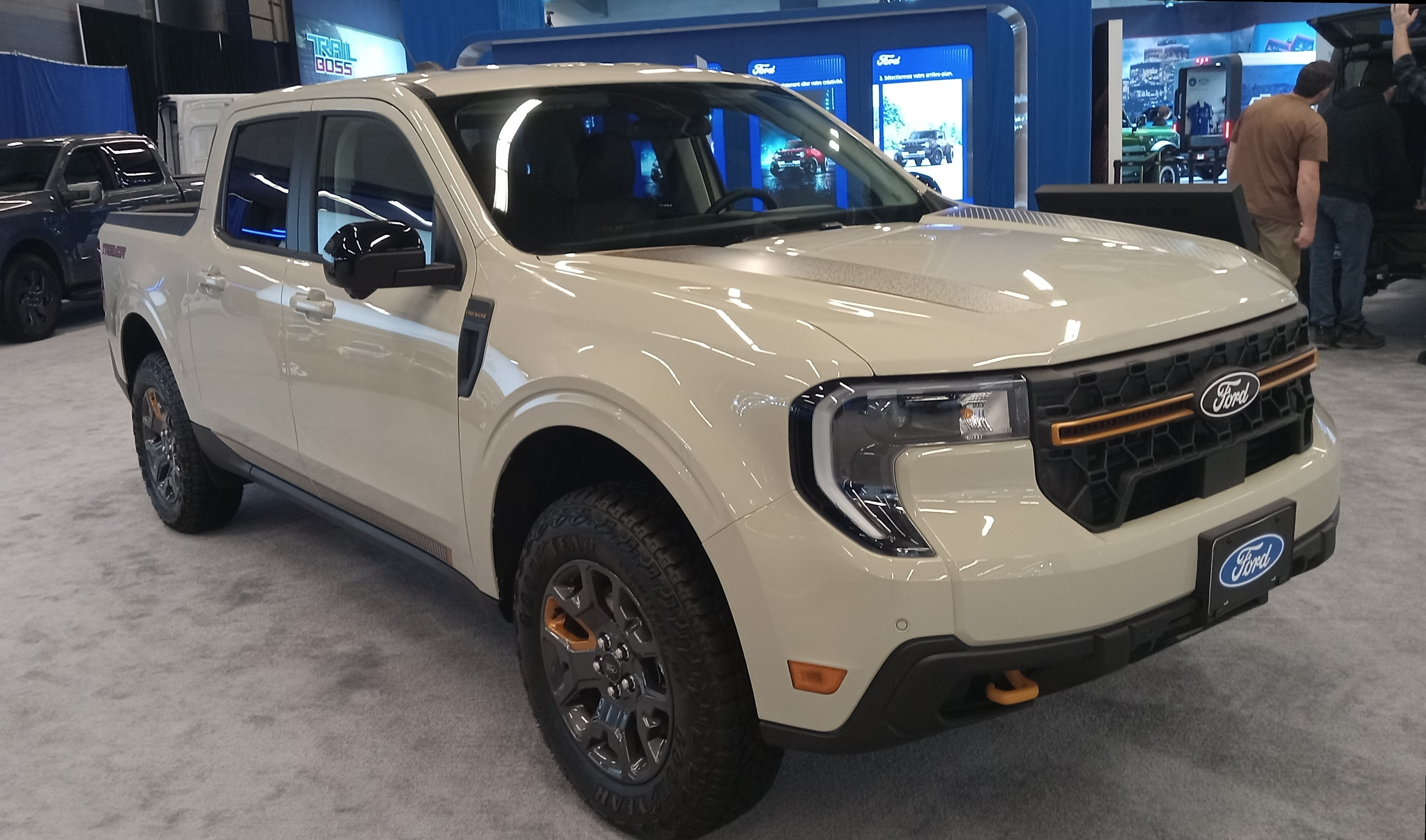
2025 Maverick Tremor

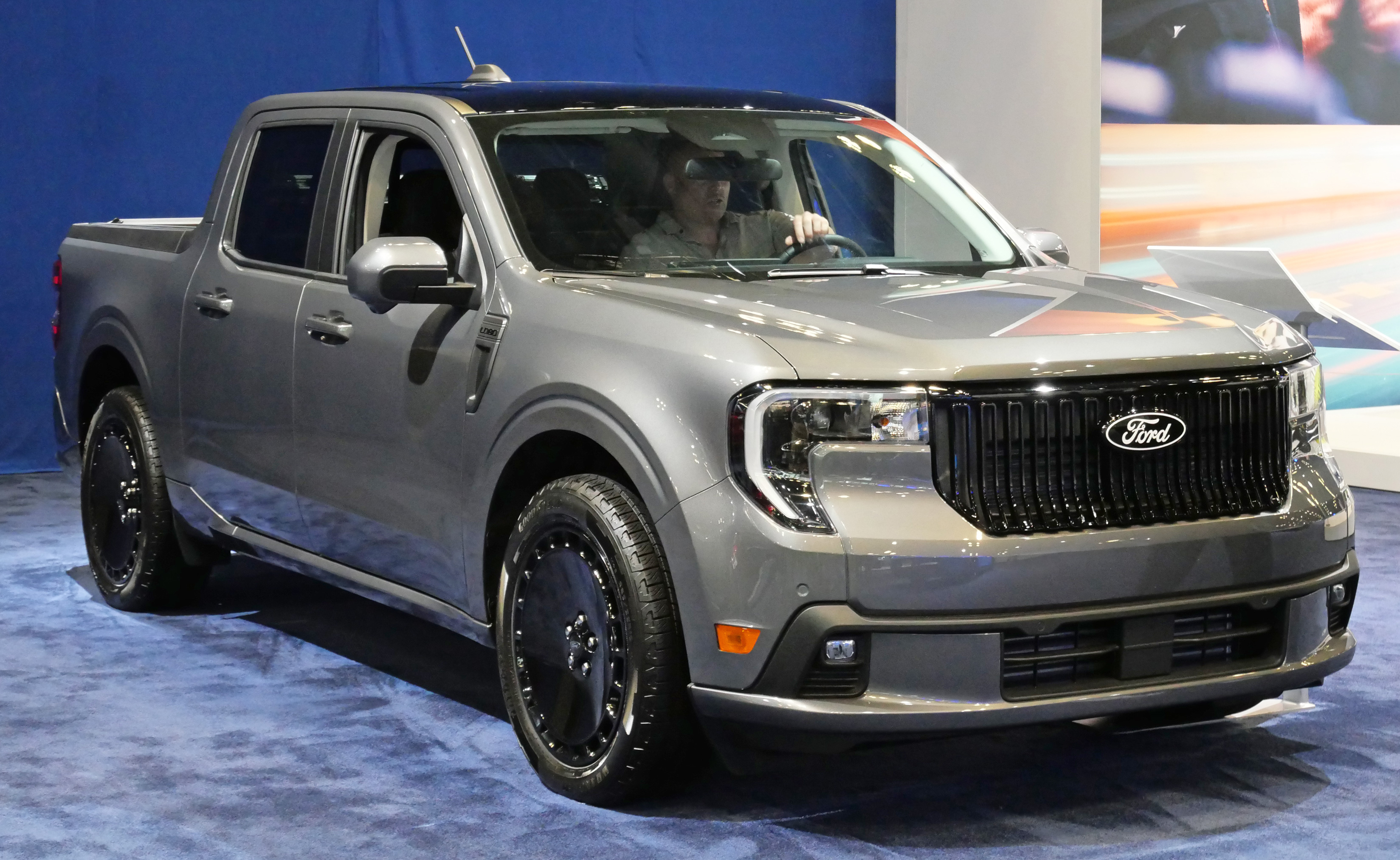
2025 Maverick Lobo

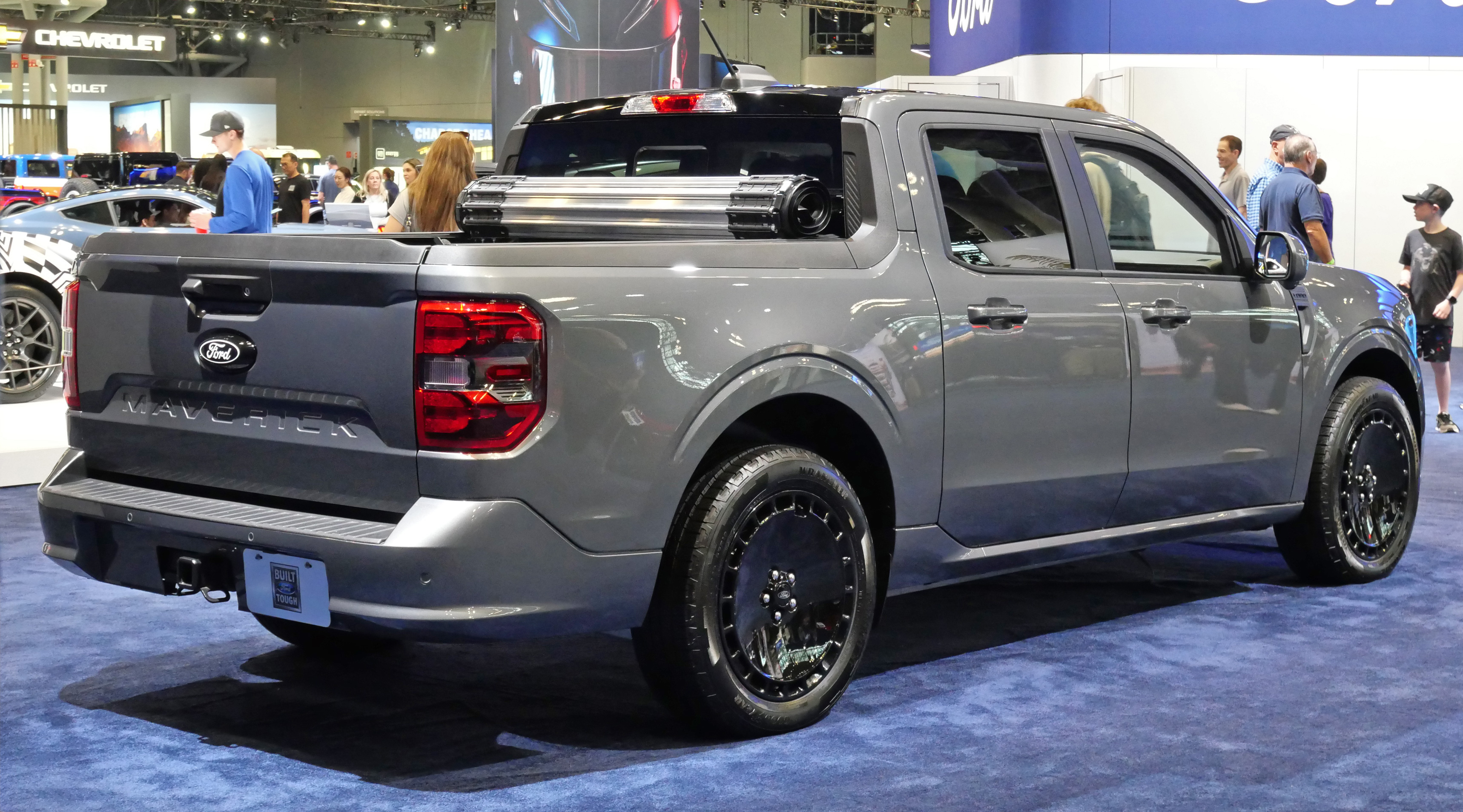
2025 Ford Maverick Lobo

== Safety ==
All trim levels provide standard Pre-Collision Assist with Automatic Emergency Braking.

=== IIHS ===
The 2022 Maverick was tested by the IIHS:

IIHS scores
Front crash prevention (Vehicle-to-Pedestrian, day)	Advanced
Front crash prevention (Vehicle-to-Pedestrian, night)	Basic
Seat belt reminders	Poor

A software update which makes more frequent and louder noises changed the IIHS rating from Poor to Good.

=== NHTSA ===
The 2022 Maverick was tested by the National Highway Traffic Safety Administration and received 4 out of 5 stars overall.

== Sales ==
Year	U.S.	Canada	Mexico	Brazil
2021	13,259	1,504	847	39
2022	74,370	7,071	2,286	1,380
2023	94,058	7,145	2,345	1,654
2024	131,142	8,099	2,555	3,538
2025	155,051	16,308	2,171	4,052
