= Ford C2 platform =

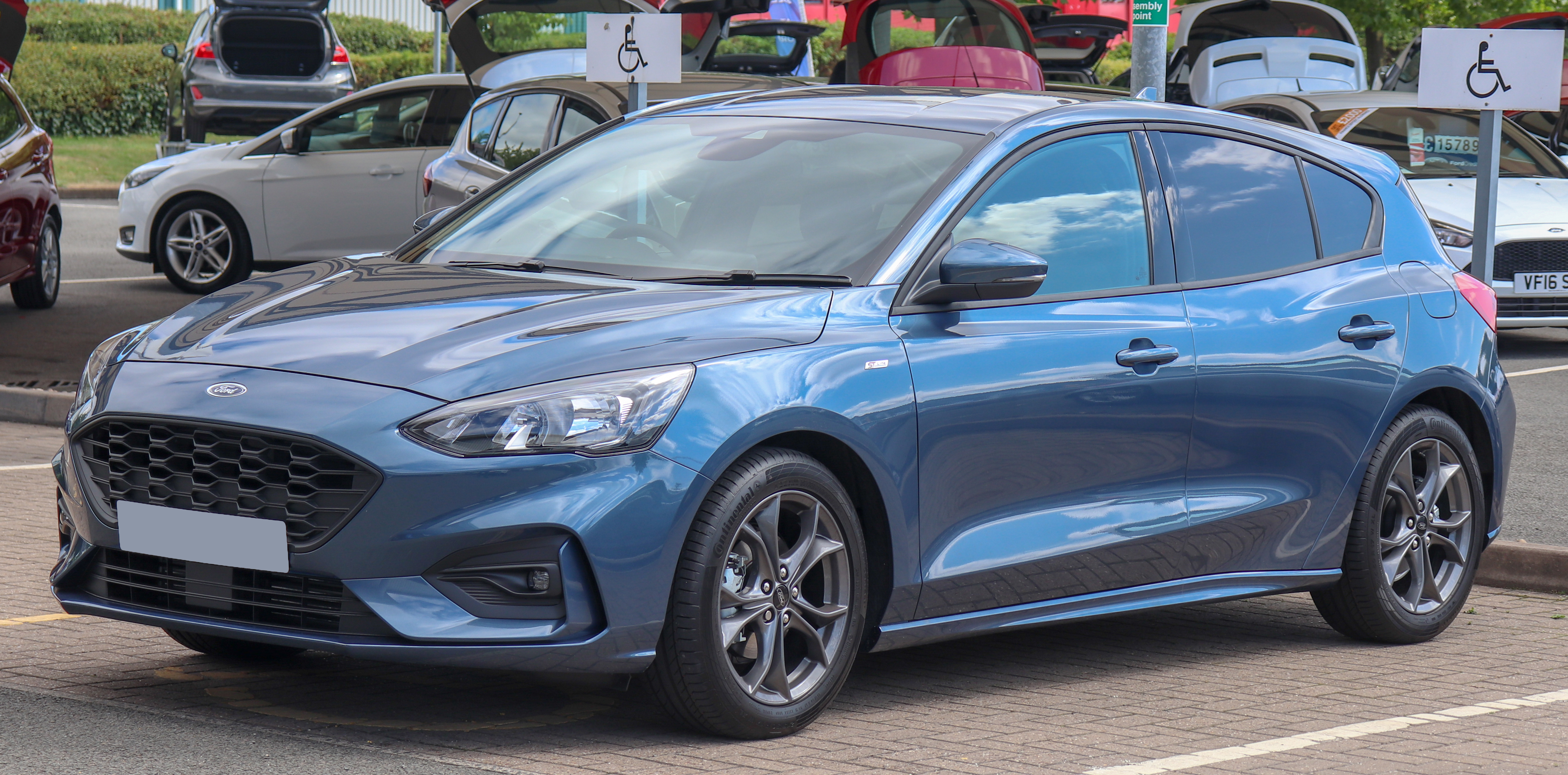
- Ford Focus (fourth generation), the first vehicle developed on the C2 platform

Overview
- Manufacturer: Ford
- Production: 2018–present

Body and chassis
- Class: Compact car/C; Mid-size luxury car (D; China); Executive (E; China)
- Layout: Front-engine, front-wheel-drive or all-wheel-drive
- Related: Ford GE1 platform

Chronology
- Predecessor: Ford C1 platform Ford CD4 platform (mid-size cars)

The Ford C2 platform is an automotive platform developed by Ford and in use since 2018, replacing the company's C1 and CD4 platforms as the basis for its compact cars (C-segment) and mid-size cars.

As with other modular platforms, the C2 can be used by a variety of models, to defray development costs. Notably, the platform can accommodate torsion beam or multilink rear suspension, and unlike its predecessors, the C2 platform can also accommodate varying wheelbase and track dimensions, from subcompact to mid-size.

== Applications ==
- Ford Focus (fourth generation) (C519; 2018–2025)
- Ford Escape (fourth generation)/Kuga (third generation) (CX482; 2019–present)
- Ford Bronco Sport (CX430; 2020–present)
- Ford Maverick (P758; 2021–present)
- Ford Mondeo Sport (2021–present)
- Ford Mondeo (China) (2022–present)
- Ford Edge L (CDX706; 2023–present)
- Lincoln Corsair (CX483; 2019–present)
- Lincoln Z (2022–present)
- Lincoln Nautilus (CDX707; 2023–present)
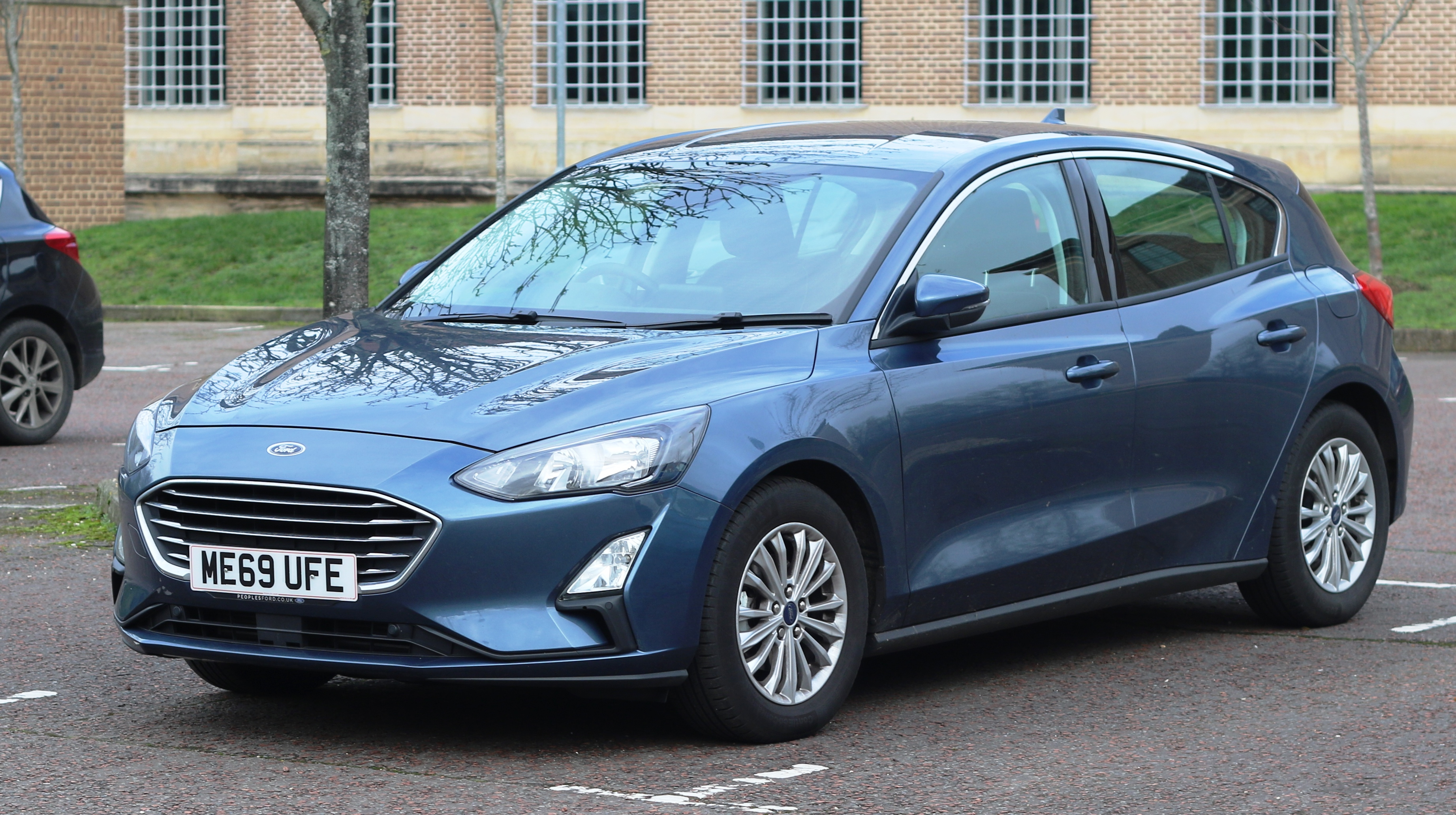
Ford Focus

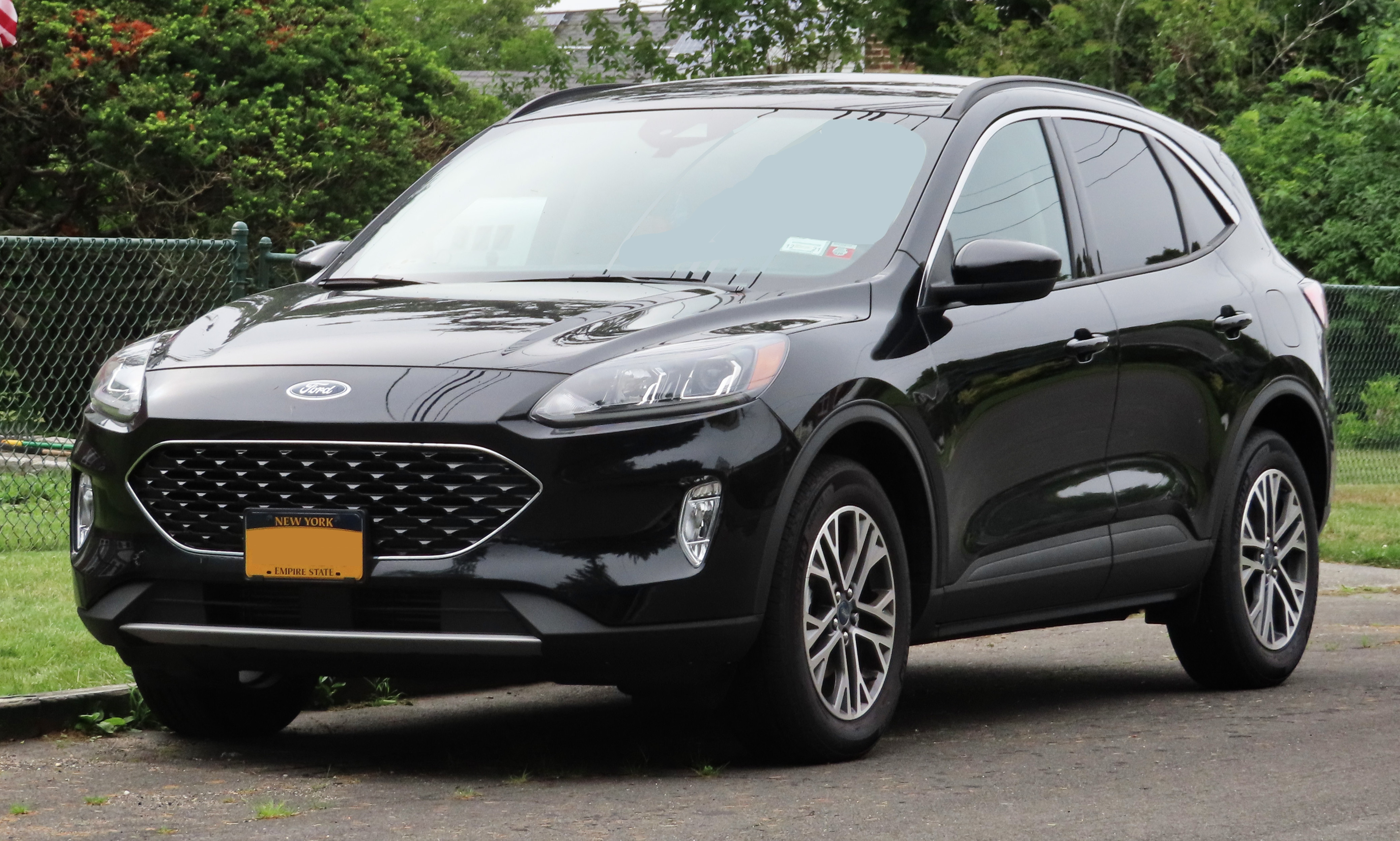
Ford Escape/Kuga

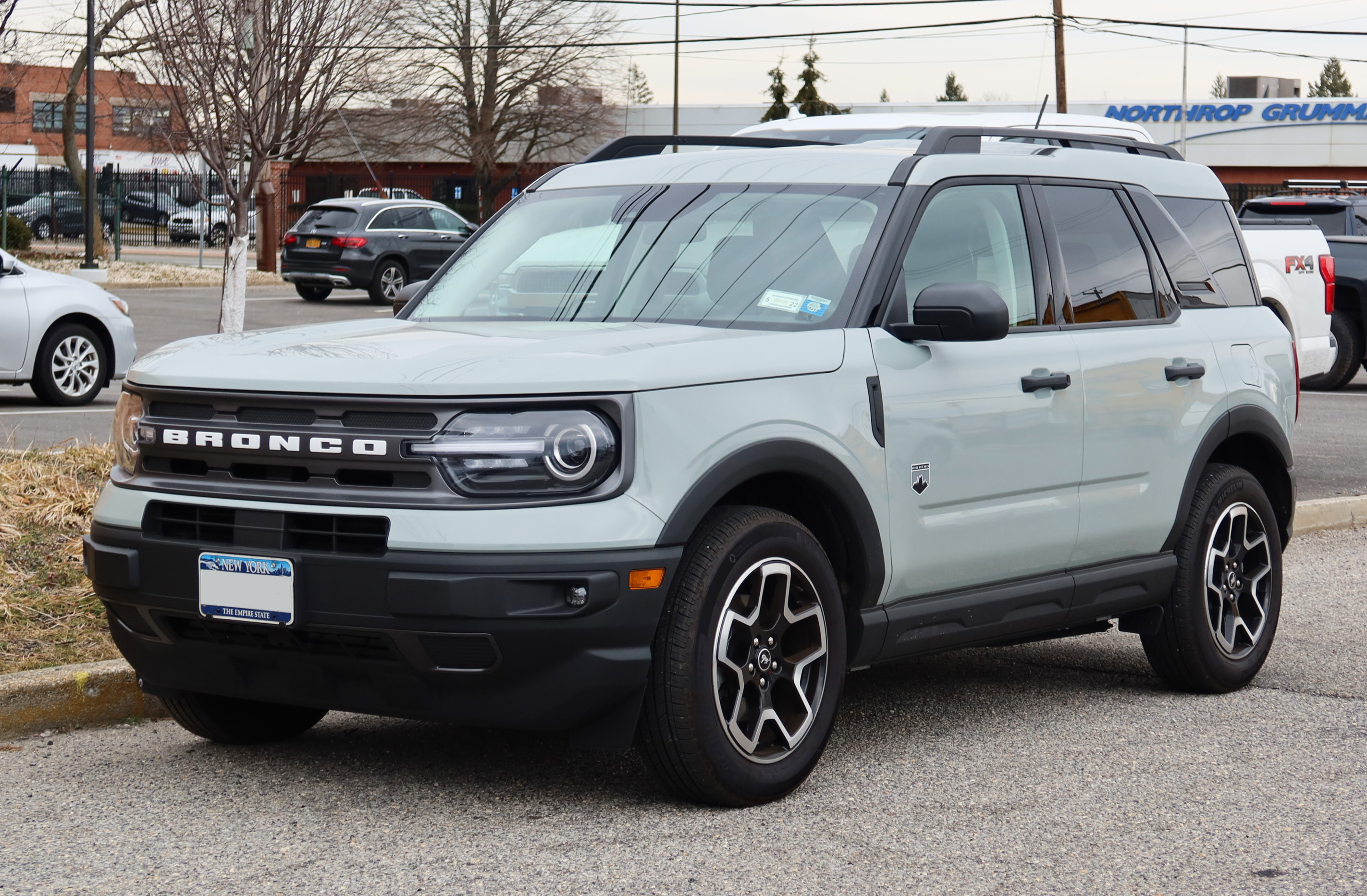
Ford Bronco Sport

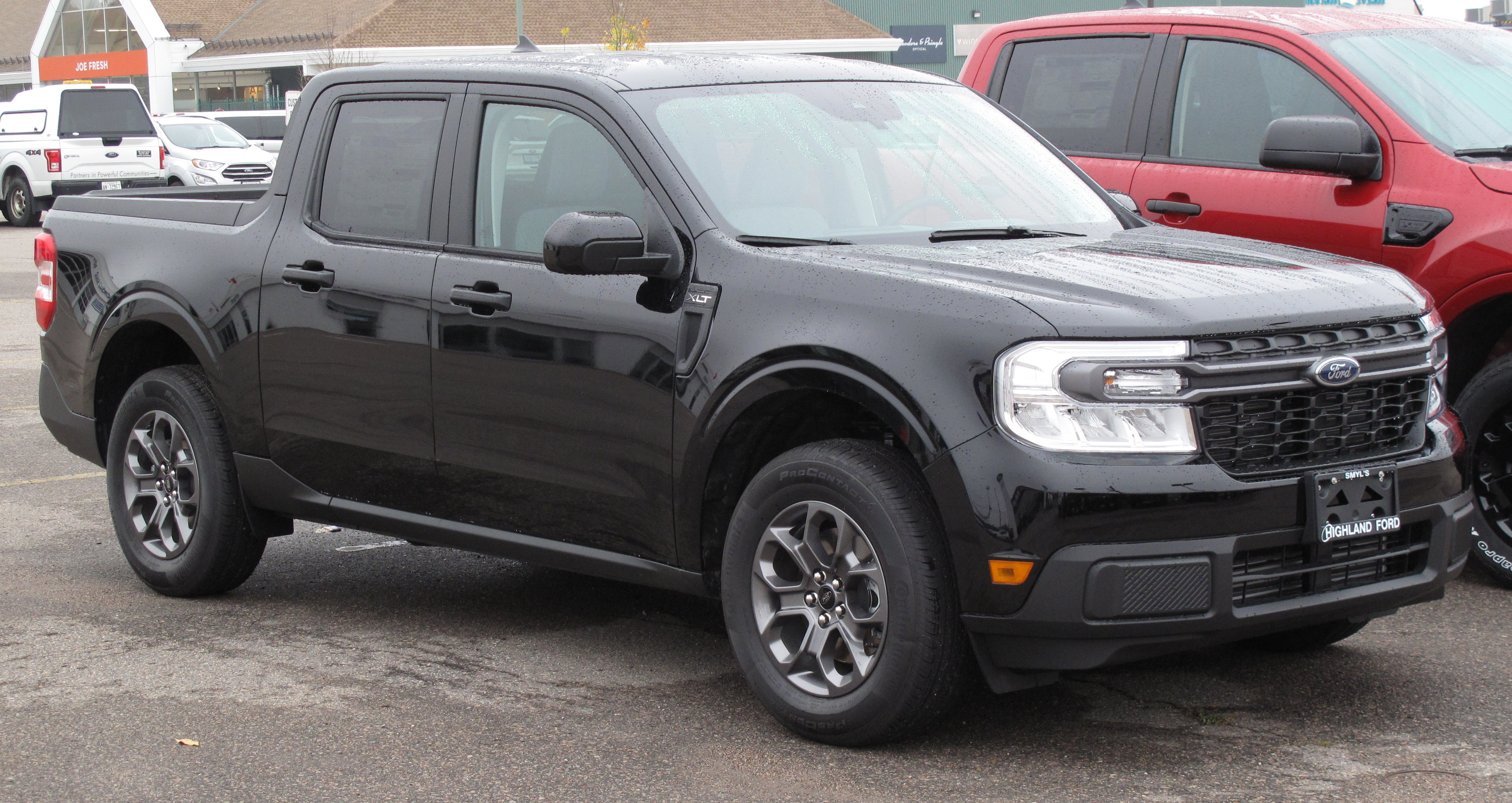
Ford Maverick

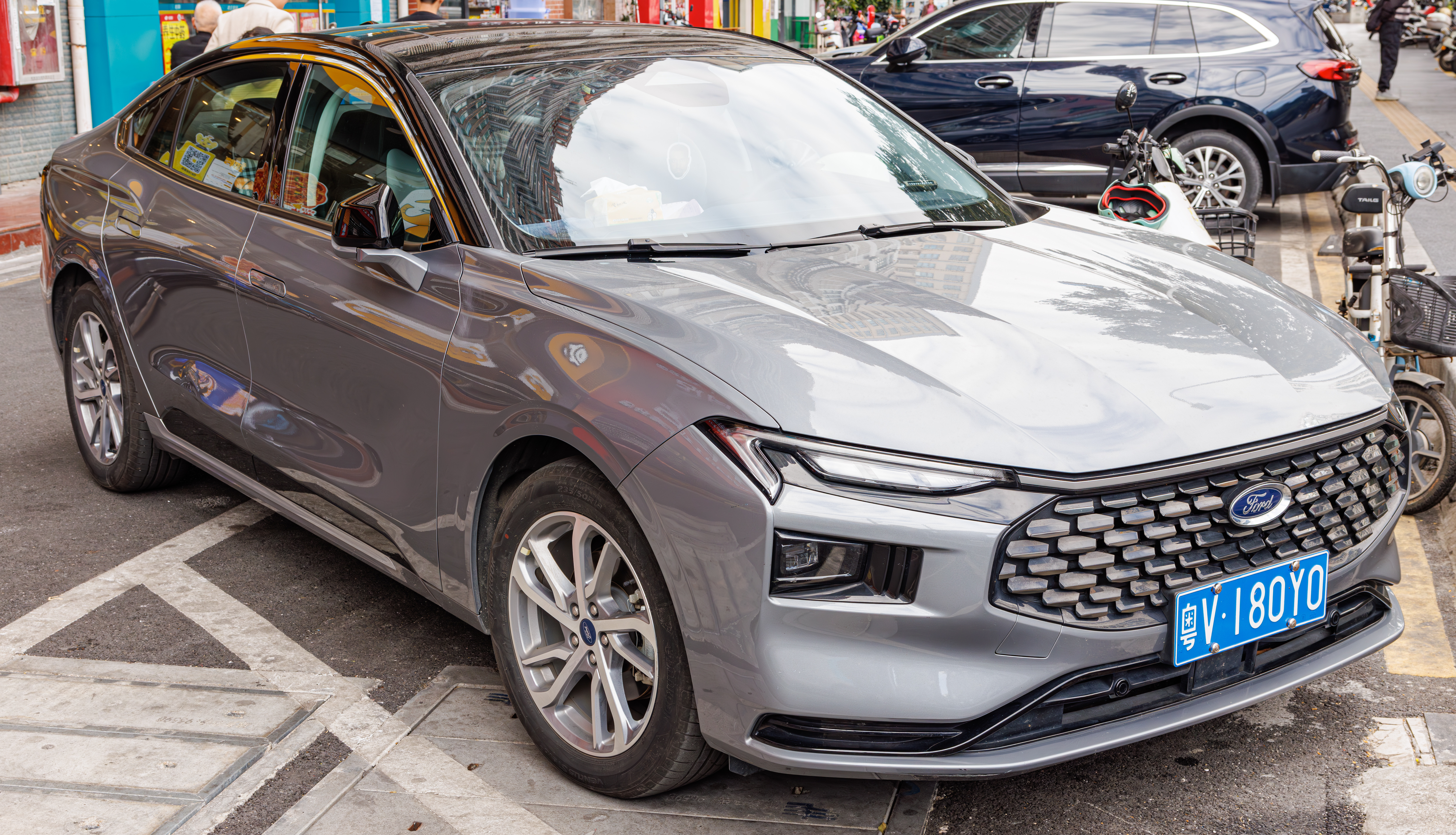
Ford Mondeo

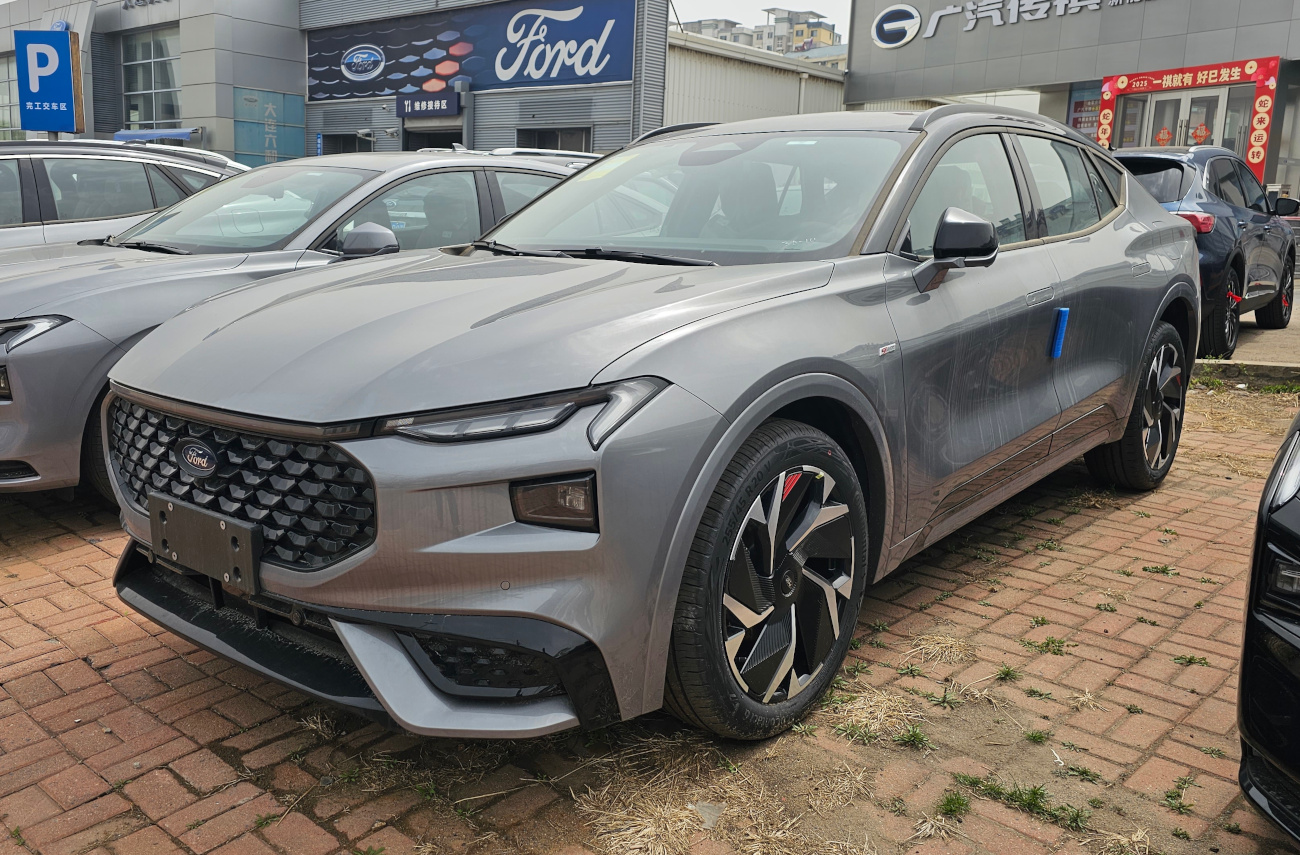
Ford Mondeo Sport

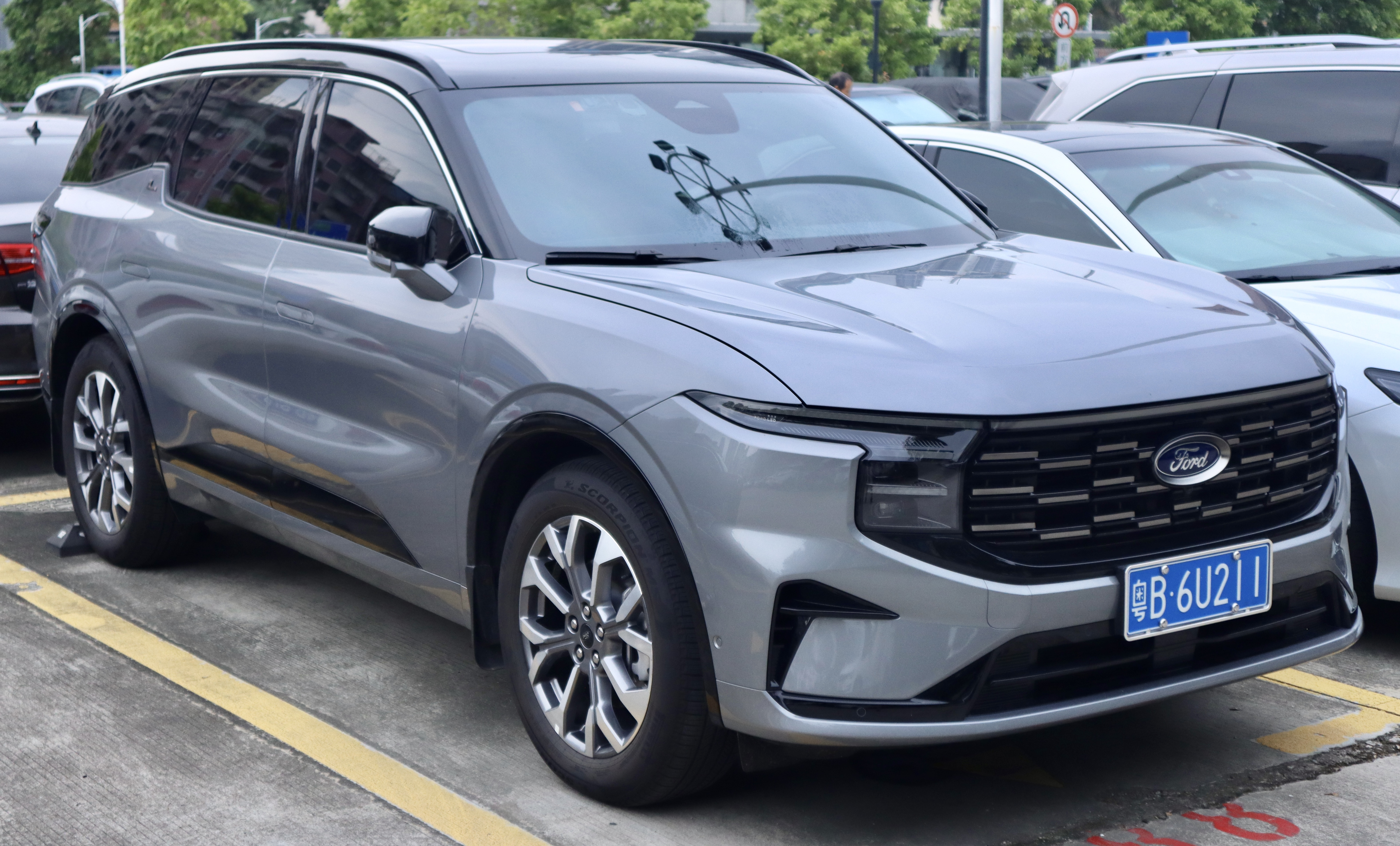
Ford Edge L

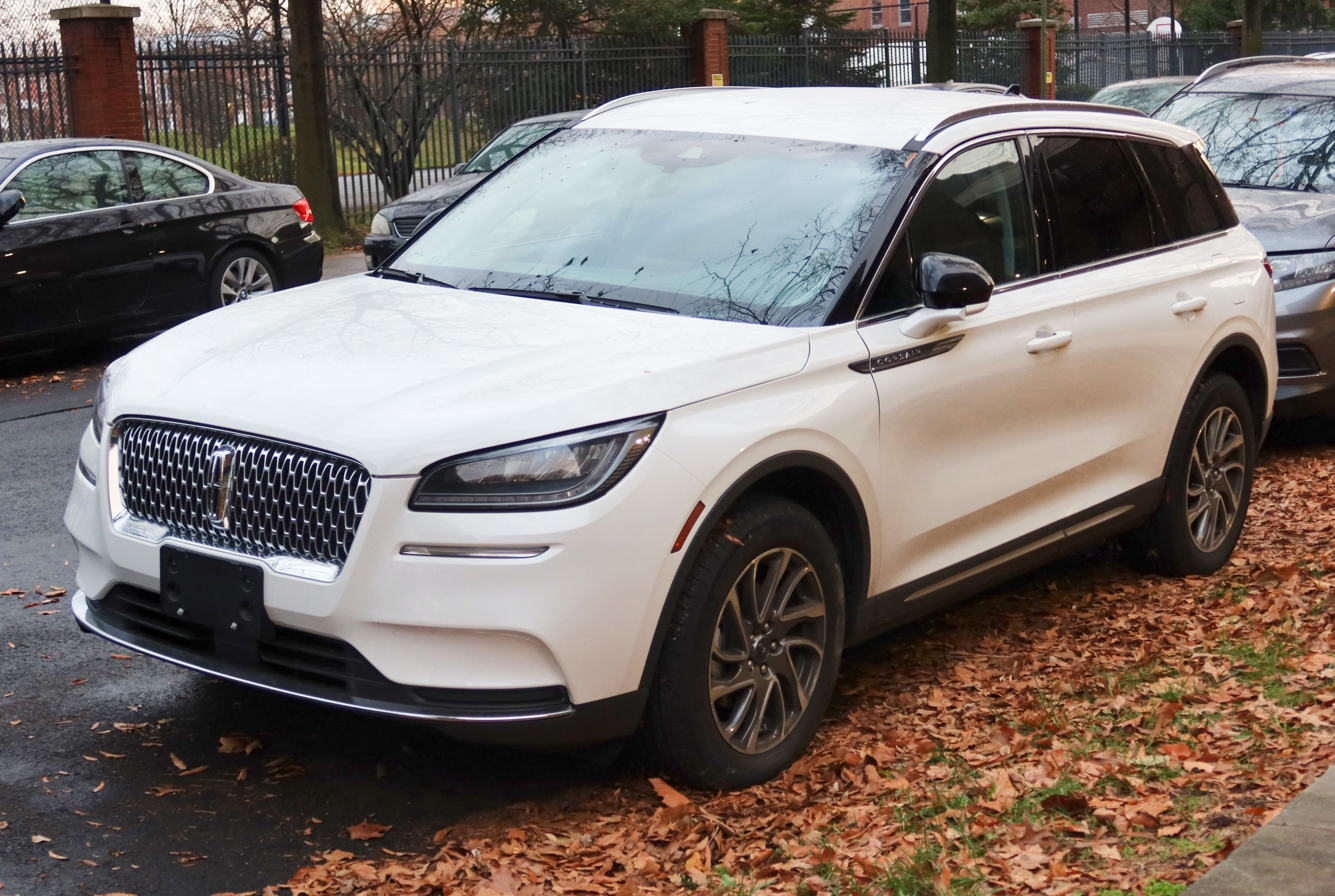
Lincoln Corsair

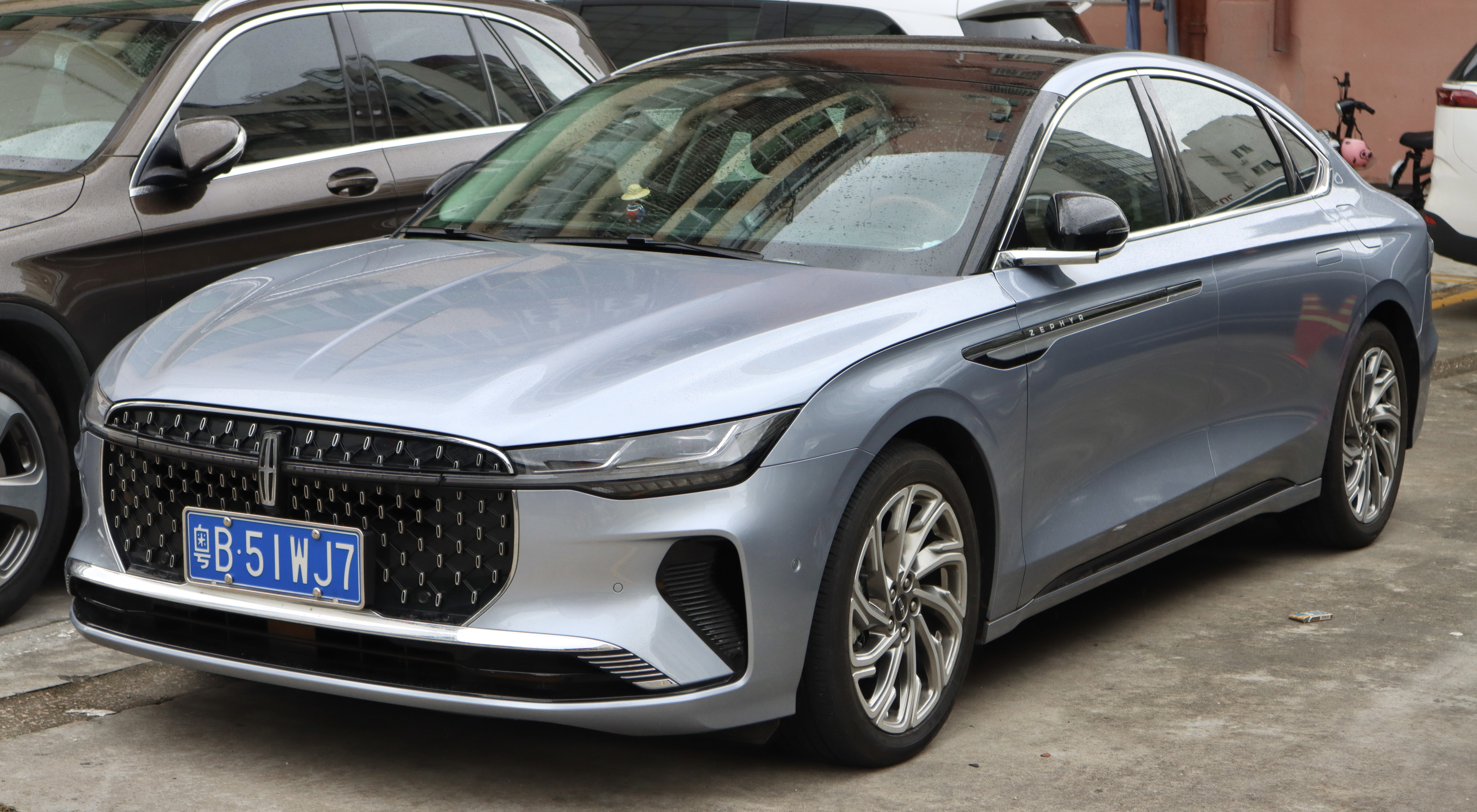
Lincoln Z

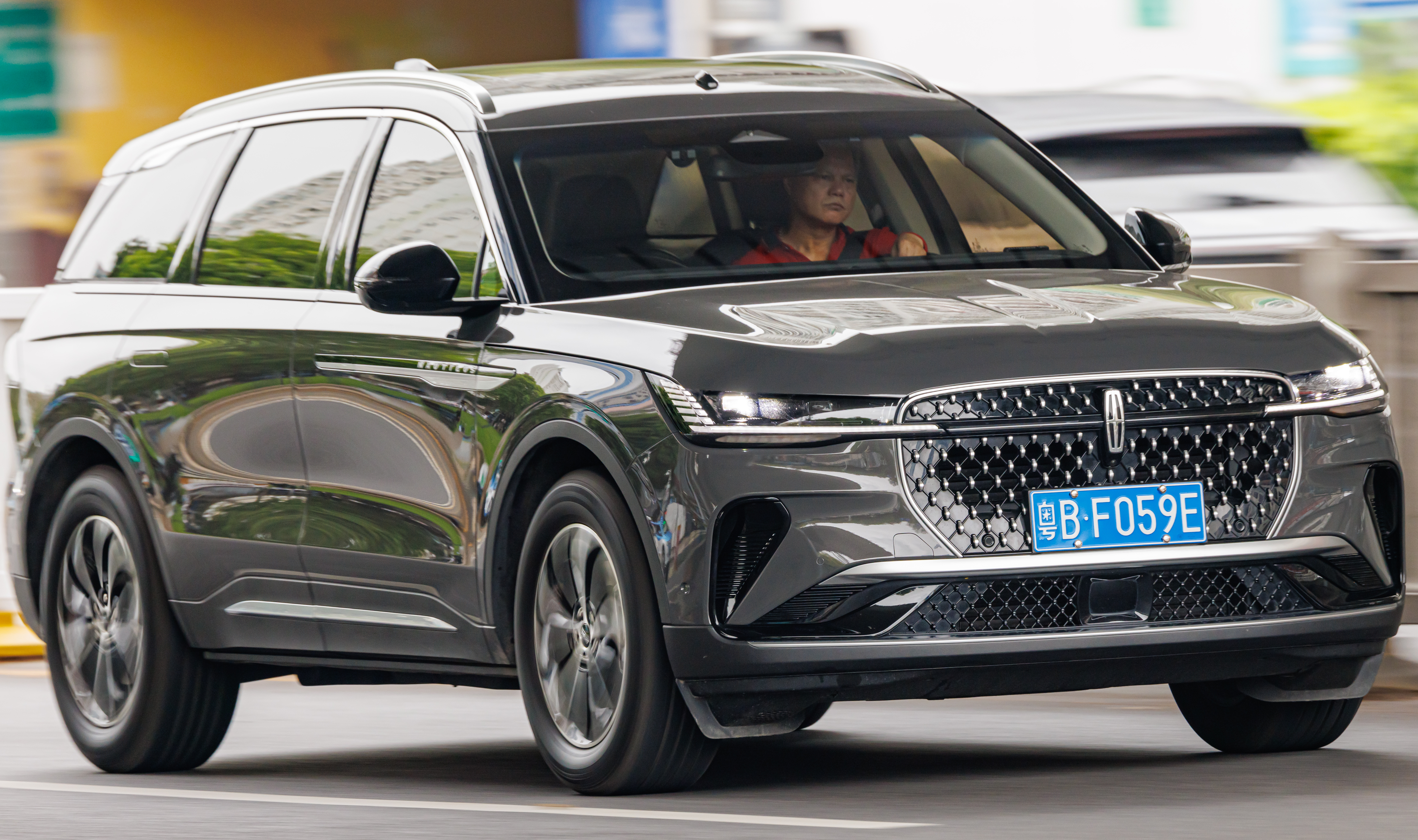
Lincoln Nautilus
