= Hermosillo Stamping and Assembly =

Ford automobile plant in Sonora, Mexico

Coordinates: 29°0′49″N 110°55′1″W

Hermosillo Stamping and Assembly (HSAP) is a Ford-owned automobile assembly facility, located in Hermosillo, Sonora Mexico — about 200 miles south of Tucson, Arizona. The plant currently manufactures Ford Bronco Sport and Ford Maverick (2022) models for the North American market.

Having entered production in 1986, Hermosillo employs 1,500 people and covers a floor space of approximately 1,500,000 ft^{2} (140,000 m^{2}).

At its inception, the plant was jointly owned by Ford and Mazda, the two companies sharing production techniques. Initially all parts were shipped from Japan for final assembly of the 323 and Tracer models. Local content has gradually increased over the years with the addition of on site suppliers. The plant is unionized under SINTRAFORD. Because of the plant's Sonoran Desert location and drought conditions during the 1990s, the plant has reduced its water usage by 40% from earlier numbers. The plant is able to supply the city from its own wells during emergencies.

In March 2019, Ford announced it would build the next-generation Transit Connect utility van at the Hermosillo plant, moving production from Spain. This plan has since been revised, as the Transit Connect has been discontinued in North America.

== Flexible manufacturing ==
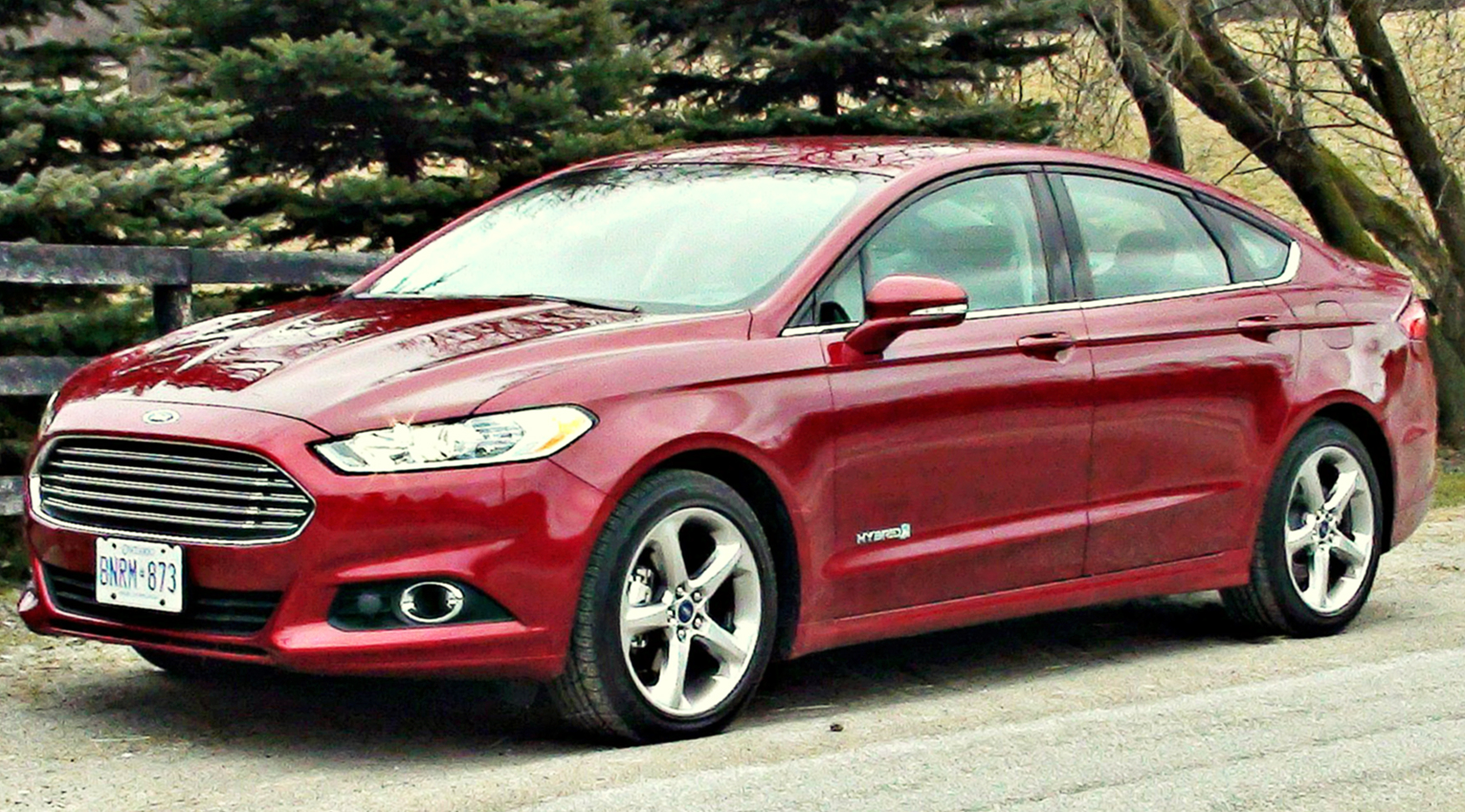
The Ford Fusion was made in Hermosillo.

For the production of the Ford CD3 platform, Ford announced in 2003 to update the plant for increased efficiency and flexibility Ford's US$1 billion investment included construction of a 1,750,000 ft^{2} (163,000 m^{2}) supplier park near the site. The improvements facilitated quick production shifts between models. Capacity of the plant was improved to 300,000 units per year. The plant was top rated in the category of "Compact Premium Conventional" for 2007 in terms of productivity, taking an average of 20.78 hours to assemble a vehicle.

== Products ==
=== Current ===
- Ford Bronco Sport (2020–present)
- Ford Maverick (2021–present)

=== Past ===
- Lincoln MKZ (2006–2020)
- Ford Fusion (2006–2020)
- Mercury Milan (2006–2011)
- Lincoln Zephyr (2006)
- Ford Focus (hatchback) (2000–2005)
- Ford Escort (1991–2002)
- Mercury Tracer (1988–1999)
