= Ford Taurus (second generation) =

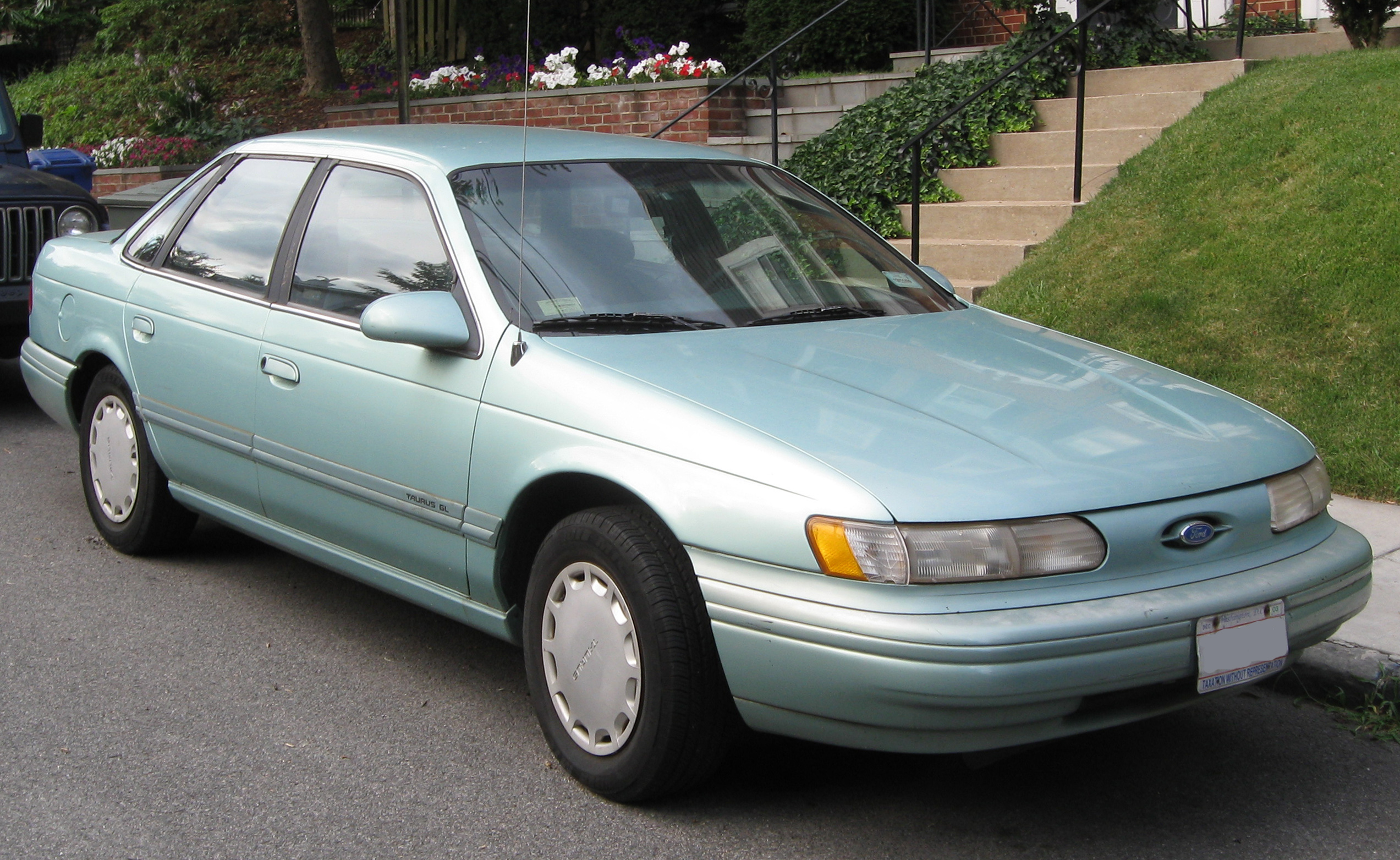

Overview
- Manufacturer: Ford
- Production: August 1991–June 16, 1995
- Model years: 1992–1995
- Assembly: Atlanta Assembly, Hapeville, Georgia, United States; Chicago Assembly, Chicago, Illinois, United States
- Designer: Jack Telnack (1988)

Body and chassis
- Class: Mid-size car
- Body style: 4-door sedan 5-door station wagon
- Layout: FF layout
- Platform: Ford DN5 platform
- Related: Mercury Sable; Lincoln Continental; Ford Windstar

Powertrain
- Engine: 3.0 L SFI Vulcan V6; 3.8 L Essex V6
- Transmission: 4-speed automatic

Dimensions
- Wheelbase: 106.0 in (2,692 mm)
- Length: Sedan: 192.0 in (4,877 mm); Station wagon: 193.1 in (4,905 mm)
- Width: 71.2 in (1,808 mm)
- Height: Sedan: 54.1 in (1,374 mm)–55.4 in (1,407 mm); Station wagon: 55.5 in (1,410 mm)
- Curb weight: 3,118 lb (1,414 kg)–3,472 lb (1,575 kg)

Chronology
- Predecessor: Ford Taurus (first generation)
- Successor: Ford Taurus (third generation)

The second-generation Ford Taurus is a mid-size car that was produced by Ford from the 1992 to 1995 model years. Slotted between the Ford Tempo (later, the Ford Contour) and the Ford Crown Victoria in size, the Taurus was sold as a four-door sedan and a five-door station wagon. While the influential styling of the first generation was played a strong role in the design, the exterior and interior underwent an extensive redesign.

As with the previous generation, the model line used the Ford DN5 platform, again shared with the Mercury Sable, with the high-performance Taurus SHO also included. In several firsts for the model line, this generation introduced flexible-fuel powertrains, standard dual airbags, and the standardization of a V6 engine. Following over 410,000 sales for the 1992 model year, the Taurus overtook the Honda Accord to become the best-selling car in the United States, a title it would hold until the 1997 model year.

The second-generation Ford Taurus was assembled alongside the Mercury Sable by Ford in its Atlanta Assembly (Hapeville, Georgia) and Chicago Assembly (Chicago, Illinois) facilities.

== Overview ==
=== Exterior ===
The exterior of the second generation was completely redesigned from the first generation. Its length was increased by a few inches, and it was a couple of hundred pounds heavier, and had a more rounded roofline. Every body panel, save for the doors, was redesigned. However, many of the redesigned components closely resembled that of the previous generation, leading many to falsely believe that this generation is just a facelift of the previous generation.

The front nose was redesigned with slimmer headlights, while retaining the first generation's "bottom breather" nose, albeit in a more aerodynamically efficient design that flowed into the front bumper. In the rear, it received new taillights that closely resembled those of the previous generation, as well as an entirely new rear clip. The trunk was also redesigned, with a spoiler being integrated into the trunk lid's design to make the car more aerodynamically efficient.

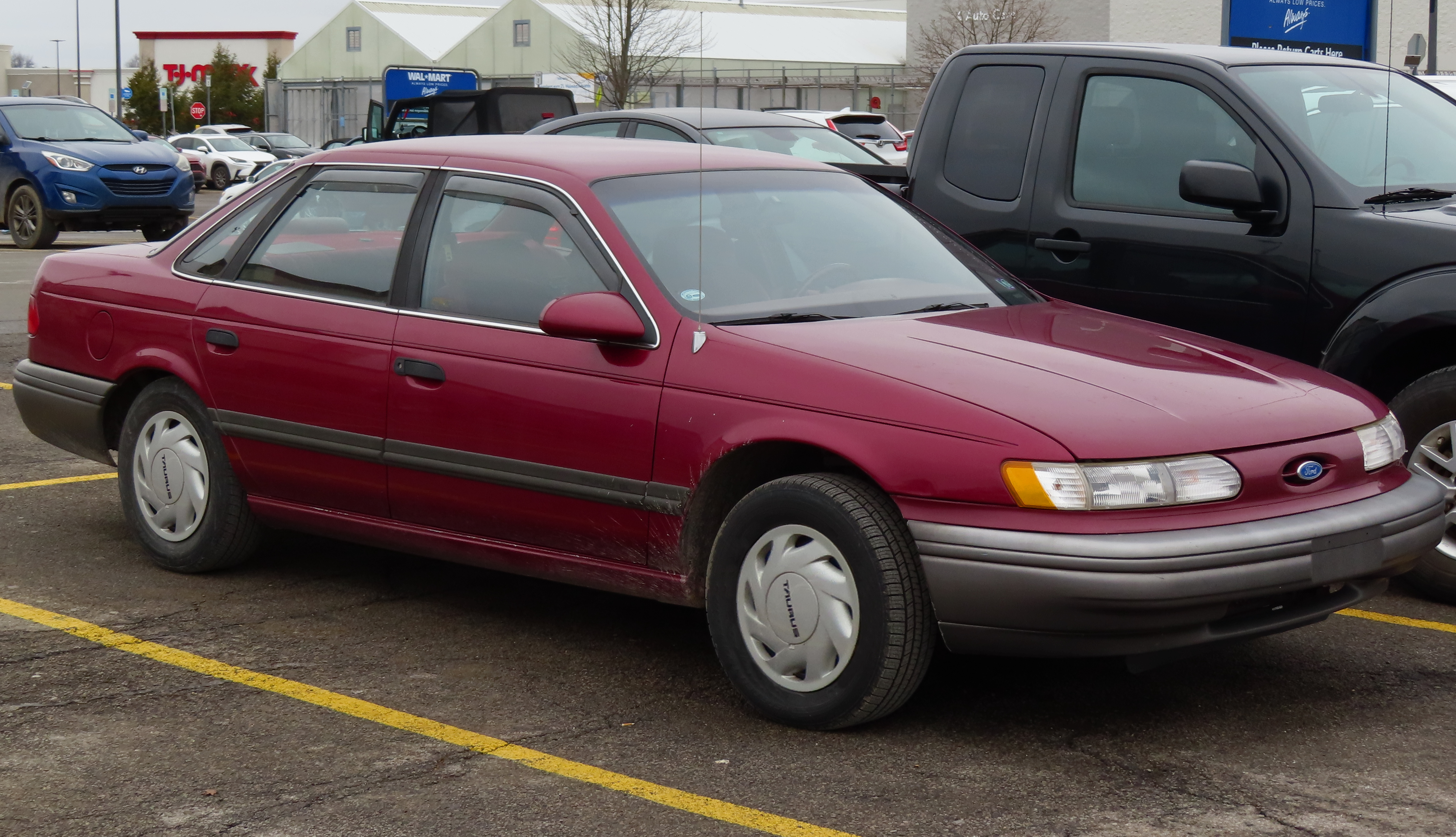
1992 Taurus GL with grey bumpers and side trim. For 1993, the aforementioned parts became color keyed.

Also with this generation, each model of Taurus received different exterior trim. The lowest level Taurus L had light grey plastic mirrors and window trim, while the bumpers and side trim were also light grey. The GL, the mid priced model, got chrome window trim and body color mirrors, while still retaining the grey bumpers and side trim. The top-of-the-line LX model had its bumpers color keyed, as well as having the grey side trim replaced with color keyed body cladding. 1992 L and GL models (and the Mercury Sable GS) could also be ordered with a two-tone paint job, in which instead of being grey, the bumpers and side trim were painted a slightly darker shade of the vehicle's body color. To cut costs, this was discontinued for the 1993 model year, as all models received color-matched trim and bumpers from that year onward.

=== Interior ===
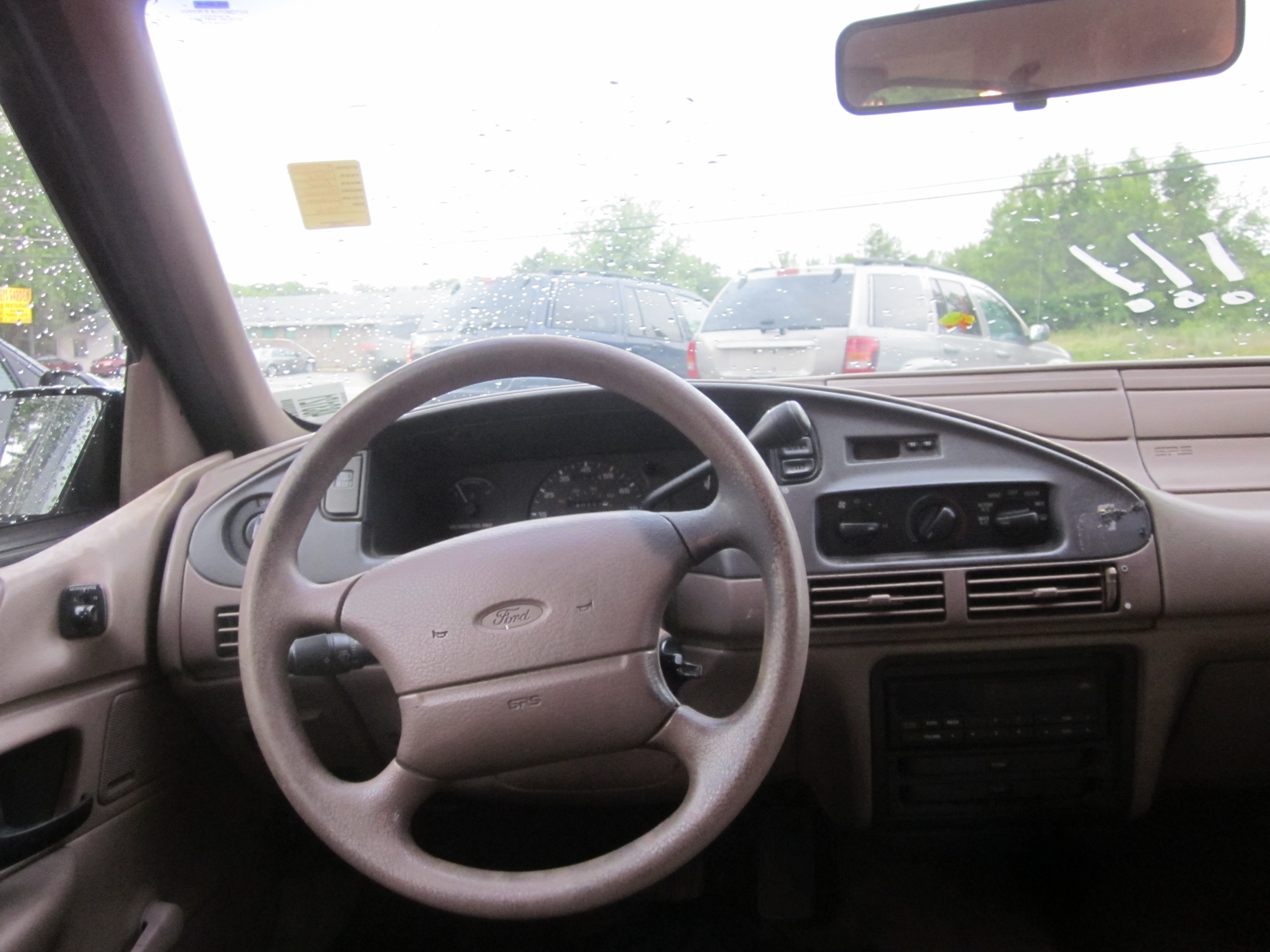
1995 Ford Taurus GL Interior

The interior was also completely redesigned for 1992. The Taurus received a new dashboard that, like the previous generation, was designed to be user friendly. Like the previous generation, it had all of the vehicle's main controls located near the left side of the dash, to be within the easy reach of the driver. Also like the previous generation, all of the controls were designed to be recognizable by touch, and to be operated by the driver without taking their eyes off the road. The new dash also contained three buttons to the right of the gauge cluster that allowed the driver to operate the radio without taking their eyes off the road. The radio was also redesigned, while the rest of the lower dash was carried over from the previous generation, as was the steering wheel. The new dash was also designed to contain a passenger's side airbag, a first of its kind. It was optional in 1992 models and became standard in 1993, making the Taurus the first car of its kind to have dual front airbags.

The seats and door panels were also redesigned. The new door panels contained integrated armrests, with the controls for the power windows and locks mounted flat on its frontal part, allowing the driver to operate them without moving their arm. These switches, along with all of the main controls, would become illuminated when the headlights were turned on, allowing the driver to easily see them at night.

Unlike the first generation, the interior was not as customizable in the second generation, and many options that were previously available were cut for 1992. The second generation now used only a single seat design shared with all models (the first generation LX got its own unique seat design), and was only available in two configurations; with a front bench seat and a column mounted shifter, or with front bucket seats and a center console with a floor mounted shifter. The console was a carryover from the first generation, although it was redesigned for 1993. The station wagon variant included dual fold-down rear-facing seats in the back.

=== Production figures ===
Ford Taurus Production Figures
	Sedan	Wagon	Yearly Total
1992	274,289	67,828	342,117
1993	350,802	76,502	427,304
1994	288,737	55,135	343,872
1995	345,244	50,494	395,738
Total	1,259,072	249,959	1,509,031

=== Models and engines ===
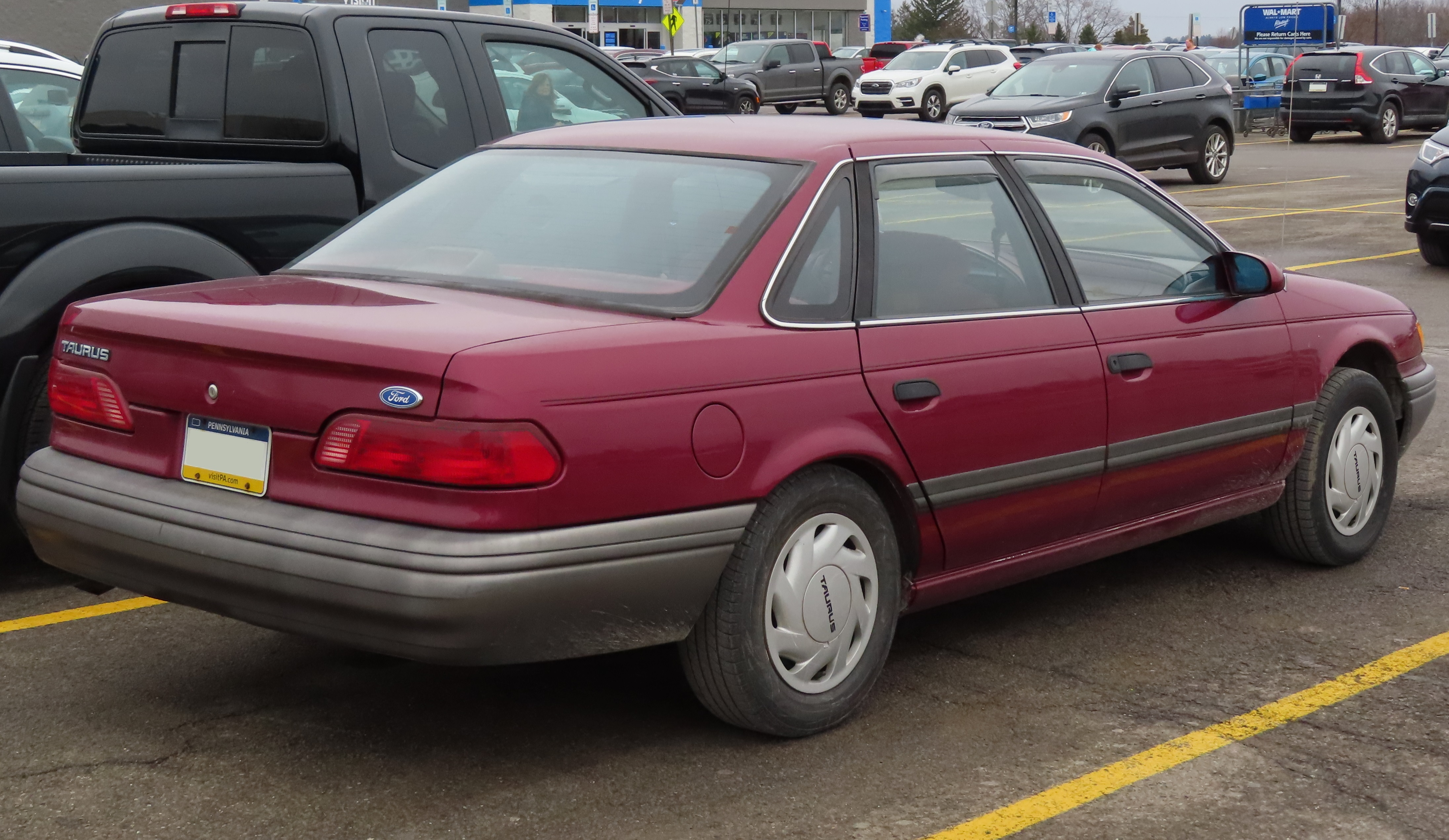
1992 Ford Taurus GL Sedan, rear view

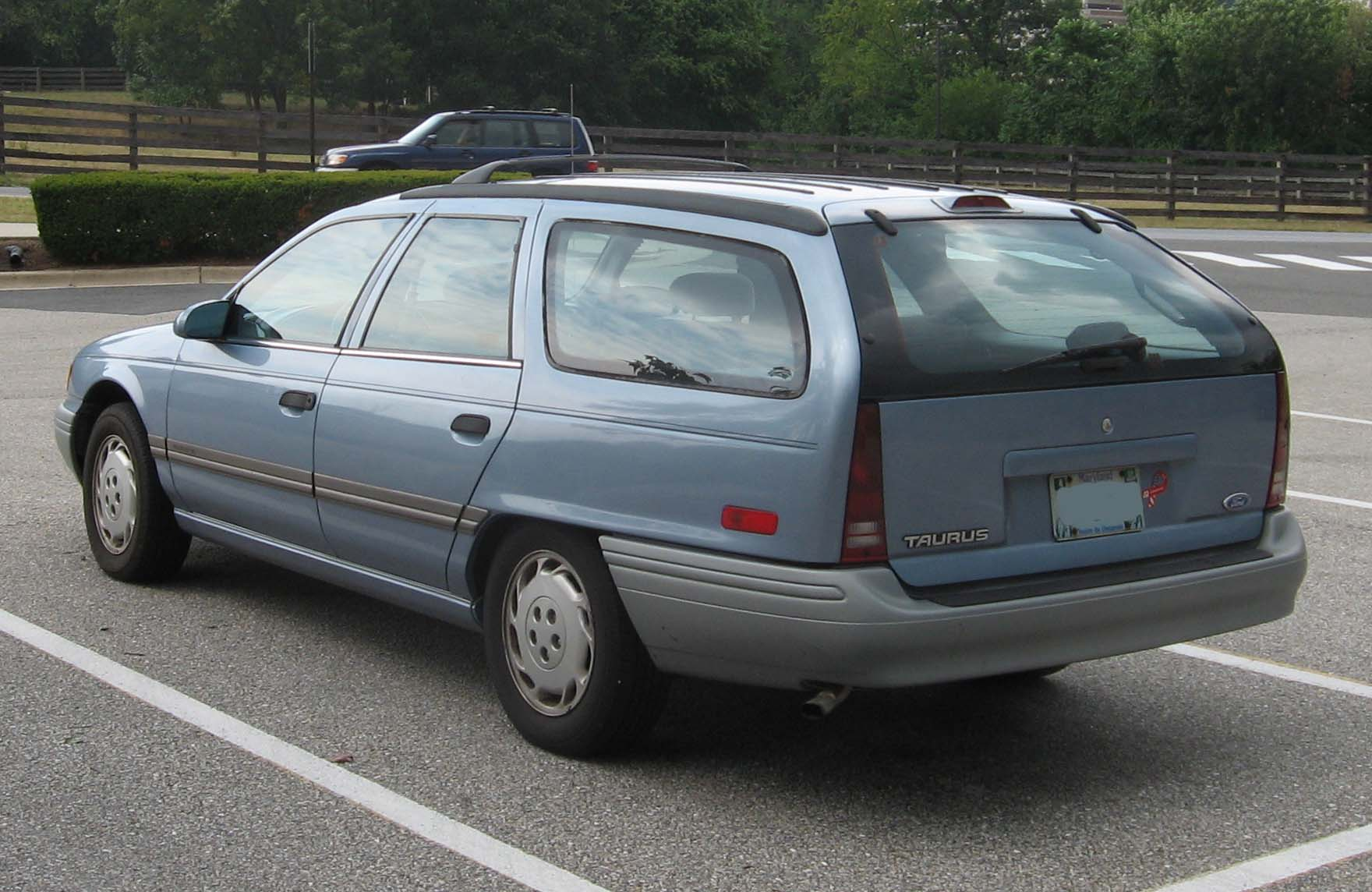
1992 Taurus wagon

For 1992, the Taurus was available in three models; L, GL, and LX. As with the first generation, the L was the basic model, the GL was the mid-priced value model, and the LX was the luxury model. Due to disappointing sales, the L was dropped after 1992, leaving the GL as the entry-level model. For the 1995 model year, a new SE model was added, intended to be a budget version of the SHO. It was a step above the entry-level GL, but a step below the top of the line LX, and came standard with front bucket seats and a center console with a floor-mounted shifter, as well as a rear spoiler borrowed from the SHO. The SE was never available as a wagon.

The second generation also came in a modified police version. A police Taurus was a GL trim with the 3.8 liter Essex V6 engine that was slightly different from the regular Essex engine. Output of the police Essex version was 15 bhp (11 kW) greater than the standard due to the addition of a dual exhaust muffler system, similar to that standard on the SHO; a Y-pipe was added after the resonator, which allowed for the split to both sides of the rear of the vehicle. Other changes included a larger fuel tank, stainless steel brake lines, standard four-wheel disc brakes with ABS, a modified front grille fascia that had a slit to allow for increased airflow to the radiator, and a certified calibration 140 mph (230 km/h) speedometer. Some were bought for speed limit enforcement, with the anonymity of the car aiding in the role. The Taurus police package didn't prove to be very popular, and it was often strongly outsold by Ford's own Crown Victoria.

When the 2.5 L HSC four-cylinder was dropped in early 1991, along with the three-speed ATX automatic transmission, all following second-generation Taurus models came standard with the 140 horsepower (104 kW) 3.0 L Vulcan V6, except for the LX wagon that came with a 3.8 L Essex V6. The Essex was optional on all other Taurus models. Every engine in this generation used the four-speed AXOD-E automatic transmission, until 1993, when it was replaced by the four-speed AX4S transmission, which was used for the rest of this generation's production run in most models. Some 1994–1995 3.0 L models came with the AX4N transaxle.

This generation Taurus was exported to Japan in limited numbers, and sold at Japanese auto dealerships called Autorama (a joint venture with Mazda), where the Taurus SHO was the only model available in both sedan and wagon versions with left-hand driving positions until 1995. To Japanese buyers, it was regarded as a luxury vehicle as the exterior dimensions and engine displacement exceeded Japanese government regulations, and buyers in Japan were liable for additional taxes.

== Variants ==
=== Mercury Sable ===
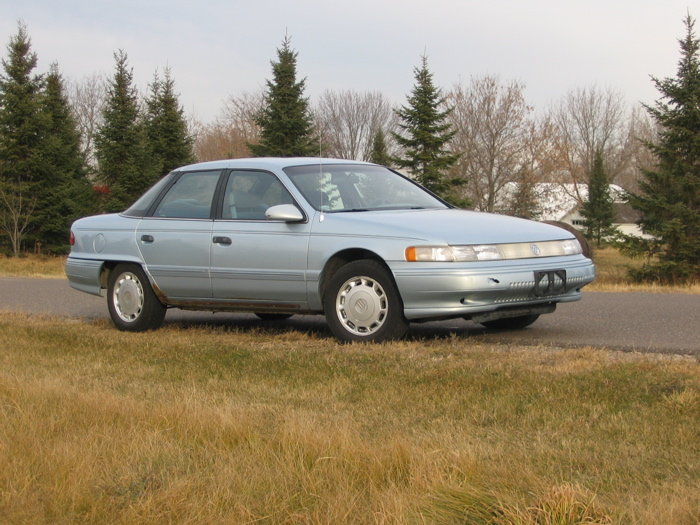
Second-generation Mercury Sable

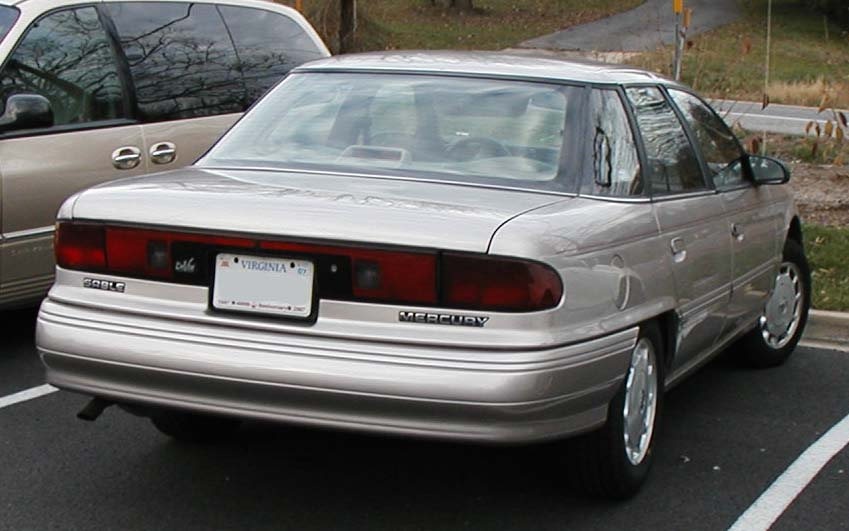
Second-generation Mercury Sable

A redesigned Mercury Sable, a sister model to the Taurus aimed at a more upscale audience, went on sale alongside the Taurus in 1991. Like the first generation, the Sable shared all of the Taurus' mechanical components but had a unique body and interior. Similar to the Taurus, the second-generation Sable's design closely resembled the first-generation model, though the body and interior were almost completely redesigned and the new model was shorter than its predecessor; while the first generation Sable had an extended wheelbase, the redesigned model had the same wheelbase as the Taurus. The new model was still offered in GS and LS models in sedan and wagon bodies, a top-of-the-line LTS trim was offered on the sedan during the 1995 model year. Powertrains and most options were the same as the Taurus, though no counterpart of the Taurus SHO was offered. The Sable was produced concurrently alongside the Taurus through the 1995 model year.

In 1993, Ford Canada hand-built 40 Mercury Sables powered by SHO V6 engines as part of their AIV (Aluminum Intensive Vehicle) program and released 20 to the public. Using aluminum suspension elements and aluminum body panels, held together with a spot welding process and adhesive joining process developed specifically for this vehicle, the end result was a car that was 400 pounds lighter than a SHO Taurus. In 1995, Multimatic Motorsports entered one of these vehicles in the One Lap of America event, finishing 15th overall and 1st in the Mid-Priced Sedan class.

=== Ford Taurus SHO ===
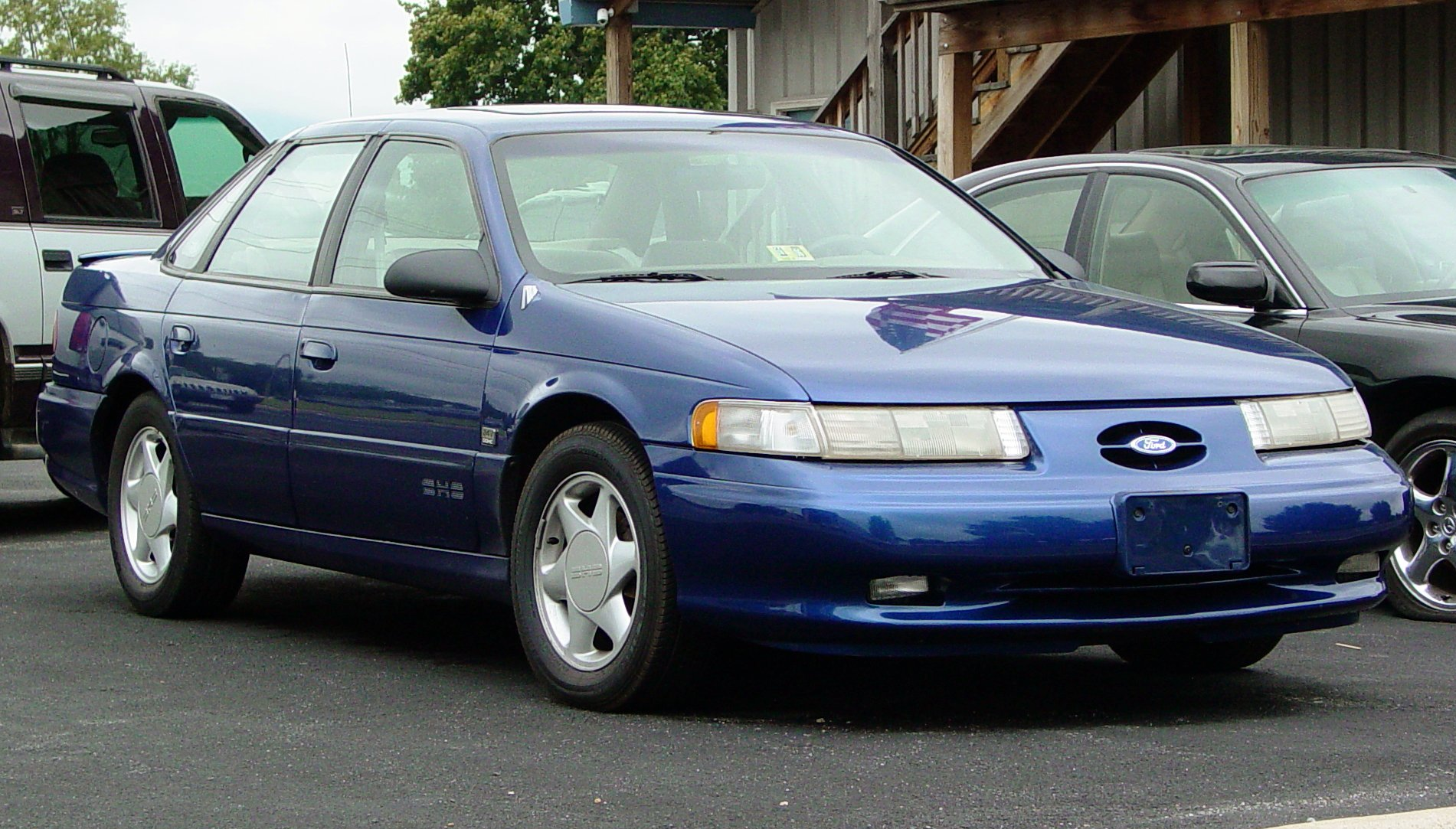
Second-generation Ford Taurus SHO

The second-generation Ford Taurus SHO was launched in the fall of 1991, along with the Taurus. Unlike the first generation, this SHO contained less aggressive body cladding, as well as a unique front end using parts largely borrowed from the Mercury Sable. Like the Taurus and Sable, the SHO's drivetrain was carried over from the first generation. The only major change came on 1993s, when an automatic transmission became optional. Automatic equipped cars got a slightly bigger engine with equal horsepower due to less aggressive camshafts.
