= Ford Windstar =

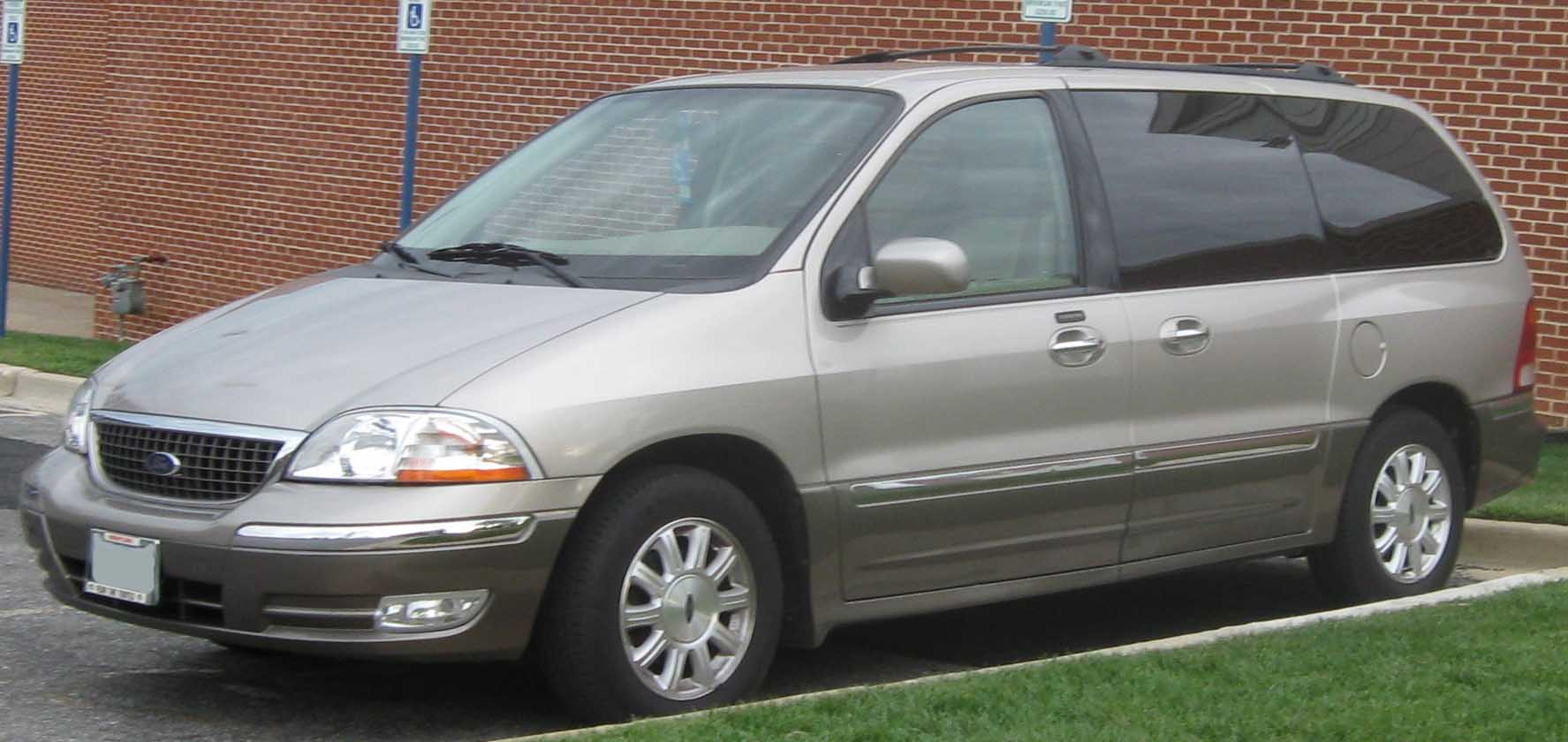
- Ford Windstar Limited, second generation example

Overview
- Manufacturer: Ford Motor Company
- Also called: Mercury Monterey (see below)
- Model years: 1995–2003 (Windstar); 2004–2007 (Freestar/Monterey)

Body and chassis
- Class: Minivan
- Layout: FF layout

Chronology
- Predecessor: Ford Aerostar; Mercury Villager (Mercury Monterey)
- Successor: Ford Freestar; Ford Galaxy (Europe)

The Ford Windstar (later the Ford Freestar and Mercury Monterey) is a minivan that was produced and sold by Ford from the 1995 to 2007 model years. The second minivan line designed by Ford, the Windstar moved closer in line to the design of the Chrysler minivans. The successor of the Ford Aerostar, the model line adopted front-wheel drive and a "two-box" body design. Three generations of the model line were produced, with the final generation taking on the Ford Freestar nameplate.

Unrelated to the Nissan-developed Mercury Villager, the Windstar was marketed without a Lincoln-Mercury counterpart. Coinciding with the introduction of the Ford Freestar for 2004, Mercury introduced its first Ford-produced minivan in a revival of the Mercury Monterey nameplate.

Following a decline in sales across the minivan segment in the mid-2000s, the Freestar and Monterey were discontinued after the 2007 model year with no direct replacement. In North America, the model line was functionally matched by the 7-passenger 2008 Ford Taurus X wagon/CUV; in Mexico, the Freestar was replaced by the Ford Transit/Tourneo. In 2014, Ford reentered the segment as the Ford Transit Connect compact MPV gained 7-passenger seating in North America.

During its production, the Ford Windstar/Freestar and the Mercury Monterey were sourced from Oakville Assembly (Oakville, Ontario). In total, 1,984,232 were produced (1,704,786 Windstars, 246,493 Freestars, and 32,953 Montereys).

== Development ==
In 1985, Ford launched the Aerostar minivan with some degree of success; while it outsold the Chevrolet Astro/GMC Safari, Volkswagen Vanagon, and its Japanese competition, it consistently remained in second place in terms of sales in the minivan segment. To better compete with Chrysler, Ford decided its next minivan would adopt the same front-wheel drive layout popularized by Chrysler.

Codenamed "WIN88", development of the front-wheel drive minivan commenced in 1988 with a projected 1993 introduction (for the 1994 model year). By 1989, design work was well underway, with a concept design theme being settled on by December 1989. In 1990, the WIN88 exterior design by Camilo Pardo was frozen for scheduled 1993 production, with prototypes being tested from early 1991. Trademarks were filed for the Windstar name at the USPTO on April 13, 1992, with development ending in 1993.

While developed by the Ford truck division (the designers of the Aerostar and Econoline/Club Wagon), the Windstar was designed predominantly by a women-led engineering and design team. Intended nearly exclusively for family use, the design team considered design scenarios from the perspective of pregnant women, women wearing skirts and high heels, and adopted family-friendly design features (reconfigurable cupholders, auxiliary stereo controls).

== First generation (1995–1998) ==
First generation
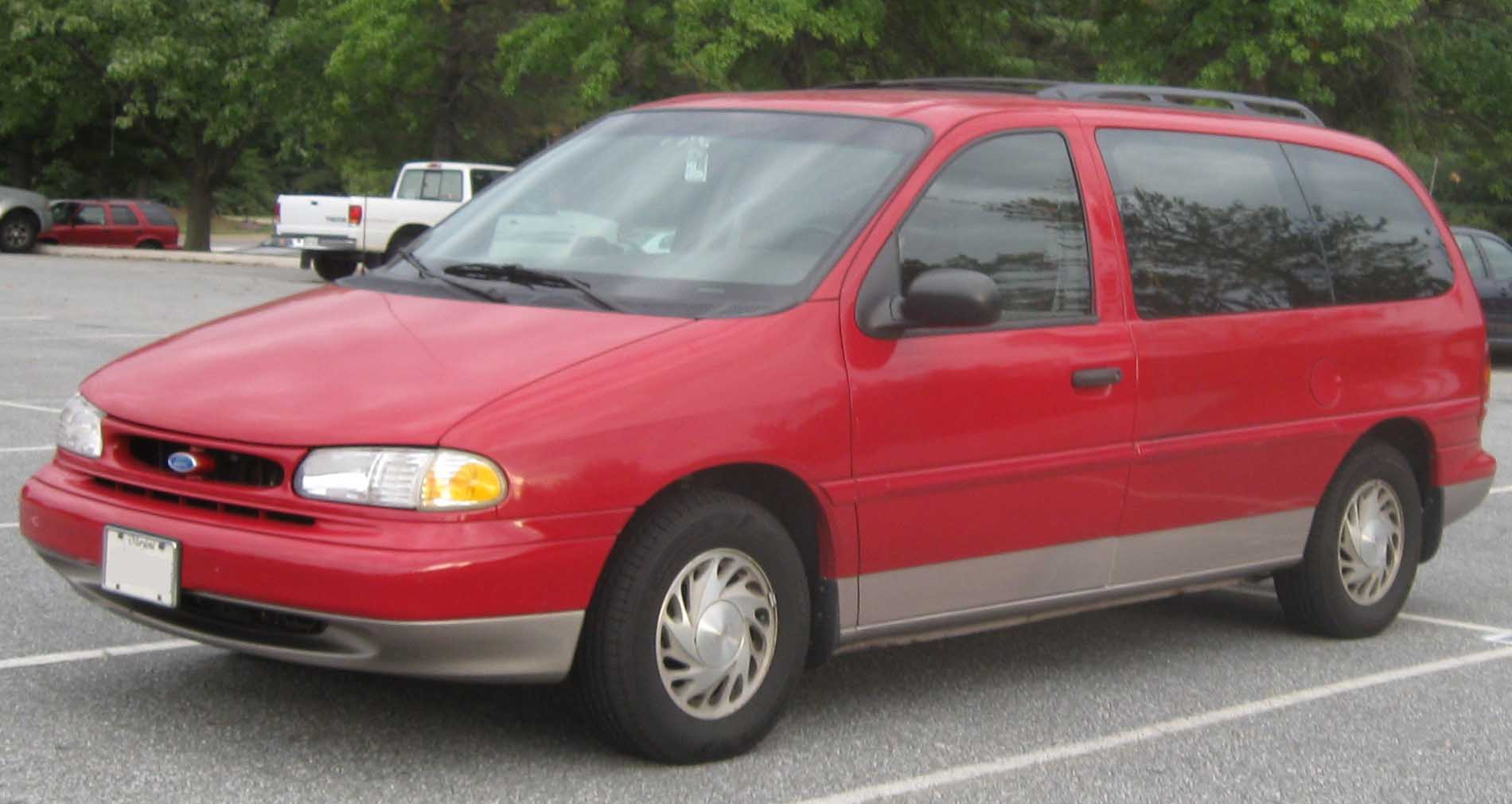

Overview
- Production: January 27, 1994 – July 1998
- Model years: 1995–1998
- Assembly: Canada: Oakville, Ontario (Oakville Assembly)
- Designer: Camilo Pardo, Jack Telnack (1990)

Body and chassis
- Body style: 3-door minivan
- Platform: Ford DN5 platform (WIN88)
- Related: Ford Taurus; Lincoln Continental; Mercury Sable

Powertrain
- Engine: 3.0 L Vulcan V6; 3.8 L Essex V6
- Transmission: 4-speed AX4S automatic

Dimensions
- Wheelbase: 120.7 in (3,066 mm)
- Length: 201.2 in (5,110 mm)
- Width: 1995–1996: 75.4 in (1,915 mm); 1997–1998: 75.8 in (1,925 mm)
- Height: 1995–1996: 68.0 in (1,727 mm); 1997–1998 Cargo: 68.5 in (1,740 mm); 1997–98: 65.6 in (1,666 mm)
- Curb weight: 3,800 lb (1,724 kg)

The Ford Windstar was released in March 1994 as a 1995 model, preceding the launch of the third-generation Chrysler minivans by over a year, enabling Ford to cut into Chrysler minivan sales significantly. While the competing model lines roughly benchmarked each other, the Windstar was sold only as an equivalent to the long-wheelbase "Grand" Chrysler vans, with Lincoln-Mercury selling the smaller, unrelated Mercury Villager (jointly developed with Nissan).

From the 1995 to 1997 model years, the Windstar was sold concurrently with its Ford Aerostar predecessor; initially slated for discontinuation following the 1994 model year, continued consumer and dealer demand for the Aerostar led Ford to market both vehicles. For its first year on the market, the Windstar was priced above both the Aerostar and the Mercury Villager. By 1997, however, the Villager's base price had surpassed the Windstar's by several hundred dollars, and top-of-the-line Villager Nautica models were priced some $6,000 USD higher.

In what would later become a design faux pas, this generation of the model line was marketed without a driver-side sliding door, a feature popularized by the introduction of third-generation Chrysler minivans. During its development, Ford claimed its focus groups did not identify it as an important feature; previously, vans (of all sizes) with a driver-side sliding door had sold poorly in the United States.

The Windstar was the first North American-built van to be exported to Europe and sold through the official Ford Europe sales channel. It was slotted above the Ford Galaxy in size and equipment level. The sole powertrain was the 3.0 L V6 engine and automatic transmission, with no diesel engine nor manual transmission available. As it wasn't available in right-hand-drive form and with left-side sliding door, it was not sold in the United Kingdom, Ireland, and other left-hand rule of road countries.

=== Chassis specification ===
The first generation Ford Windstar is codenamed WIN88, sharing the front-wheel drive DN5 platform with the first-generation Ford Taurus and Mercury Sable. Using a 120.7-inch wheelbase (nearly 15 inches longer than the Taurus), the Windstar replaced the integrated frame-rail design of the Aerostar with full unibody construction. The front suspension used MacPherson struts, while the rear suspension was a beam axle using coil springs; air suspension was an option.

Front brakes were discs, with rear drum brakes; anti-lock braking was standard. In 1996, four-wheel disc brakes were introduced as an option (when ordered with traction control or the towing package). In contrast to the Aerostar, 15-inch wheels were fitted to the first-generation Windstar (except the 1998 Limited).

==== Powertrain ====
The Windstar shared its powertrains with the Ford Taurus/Mercury Sable. For its 1995 launch, the 3.8L V6 was the sole engine in GL and LX Models, producing 155 hp; a 150 hp 3.0L V6 was introduced as the standard engine in October 1995 for base and lower GL models. For 1996, the 3.8L V6 saw its output increased to 200 hp.

=== Body design ===
To compete more closely with the Chrysler minivans, Ford designers shifted from a "one-box" design to a "two-box" configuration; influenced somewhat by the Mercury Villager, the Windstar had a distinct hoodline and passenger compartment. Benchmarked in size against the long-wheelbase "Grand" Chrysler minivans, the Windstar was given a longer wheelbase than the Aerostar and both the second and third-generation Chrysler minivans; only a long-wheelbase version was marketed.

In what would be a preview of the 1996 Ford Taurus, the Windstar was designed with an oval rear window, though adopting several design elements of the Mercury Villager/Nissan Quest. While far more vertically oriented, the curved dashboard of the Windstar shares influences of the multi-tiered design used by the Lincoln Mark VIII.

For 1996 and 1997, there were no exterior changes except the base-trim model renamed the 3.0L. The GL did however get the option of Quad Command Bucket Seats which was coupled with alloy wheels and a premium audio system. Most dealers marketed it as a "GLX" model. The Quad Command Seating changed the seats from the high back buckets in the front to the low back bucket seats. Traction control was also available on upper end GL Models.

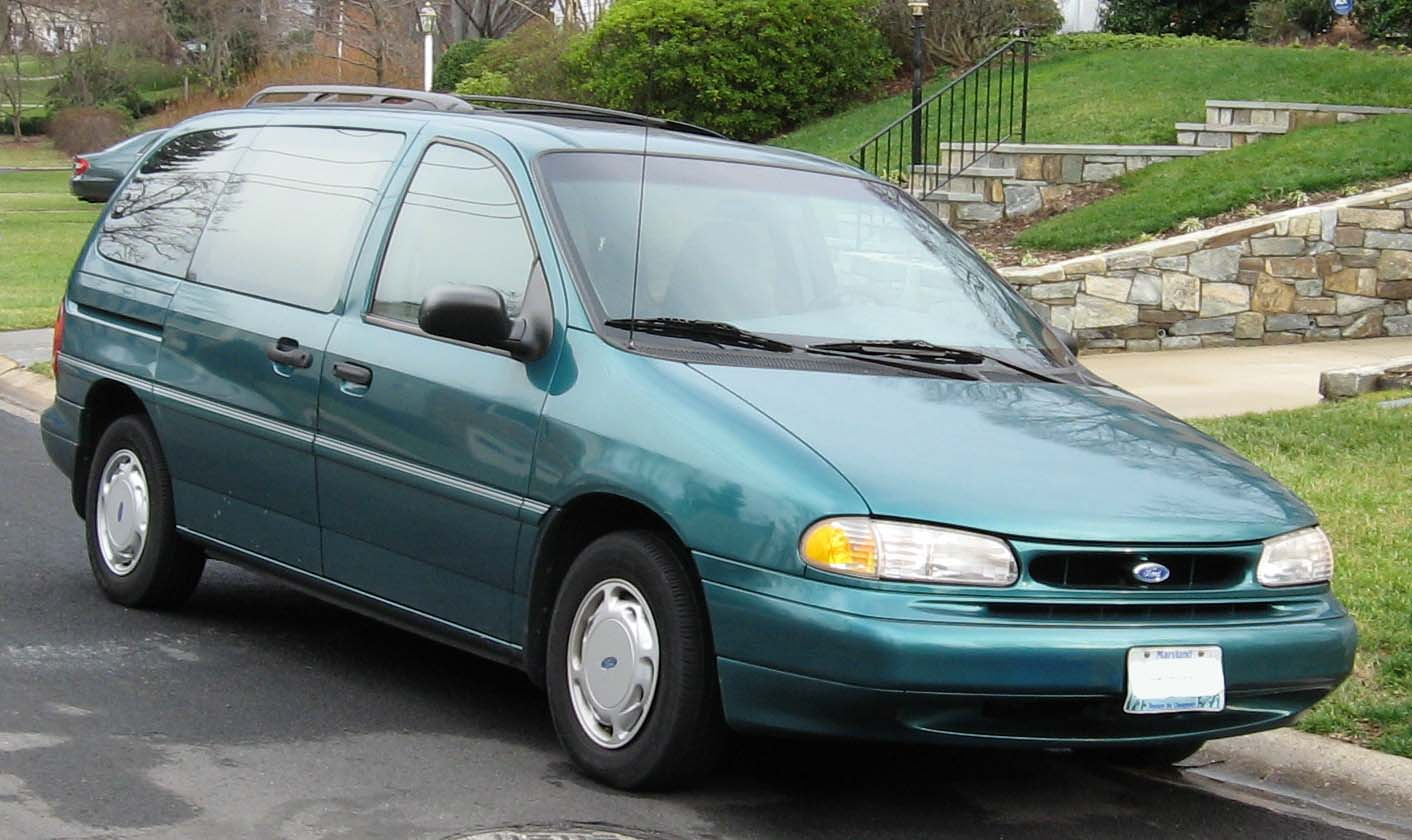
1995–1997 Ford Windstar GL

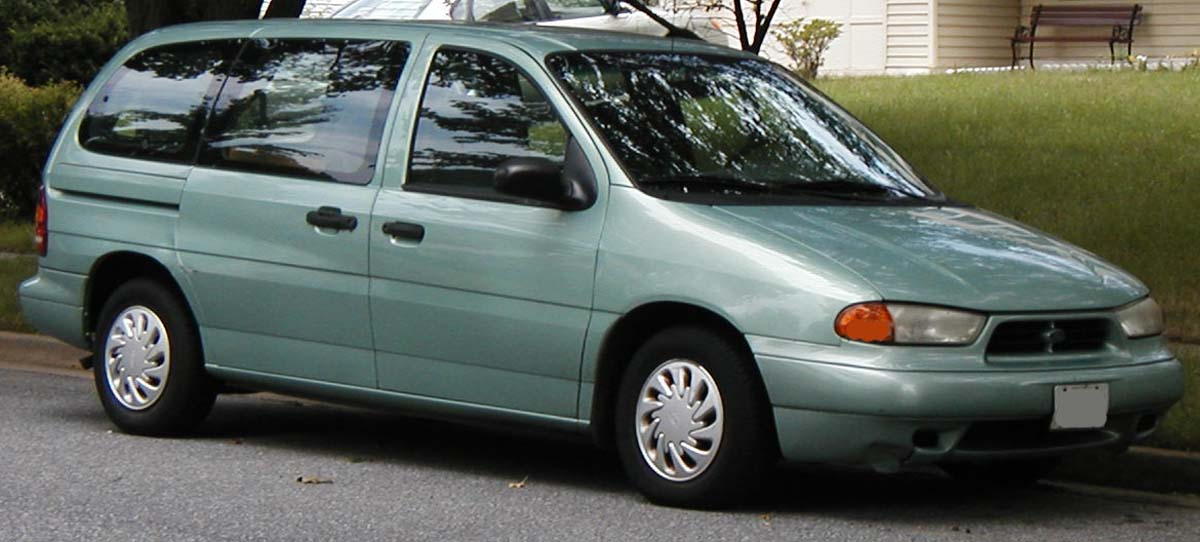
1998 Ford Windstar 3.0L

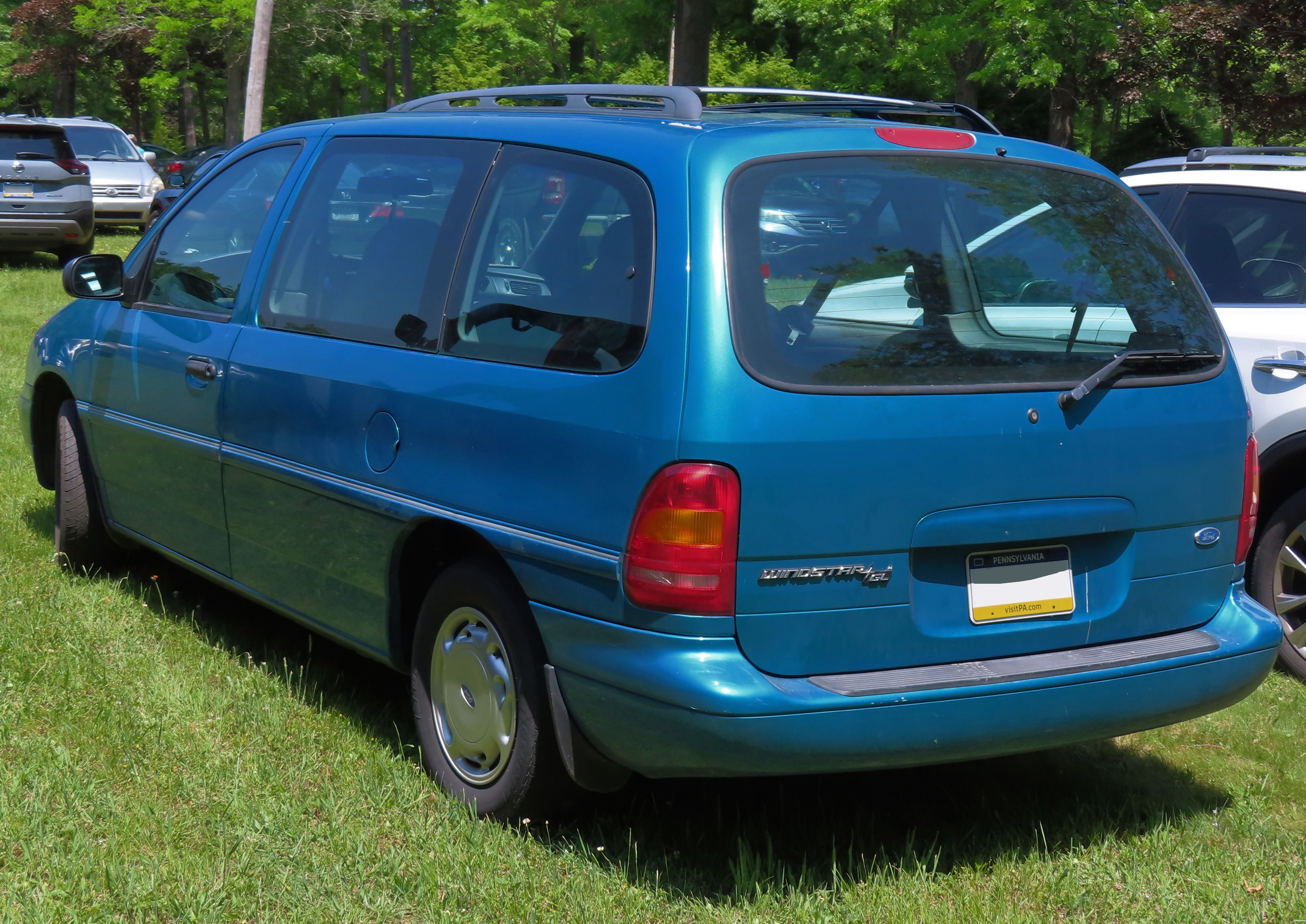
1996 Windstar GL, rear

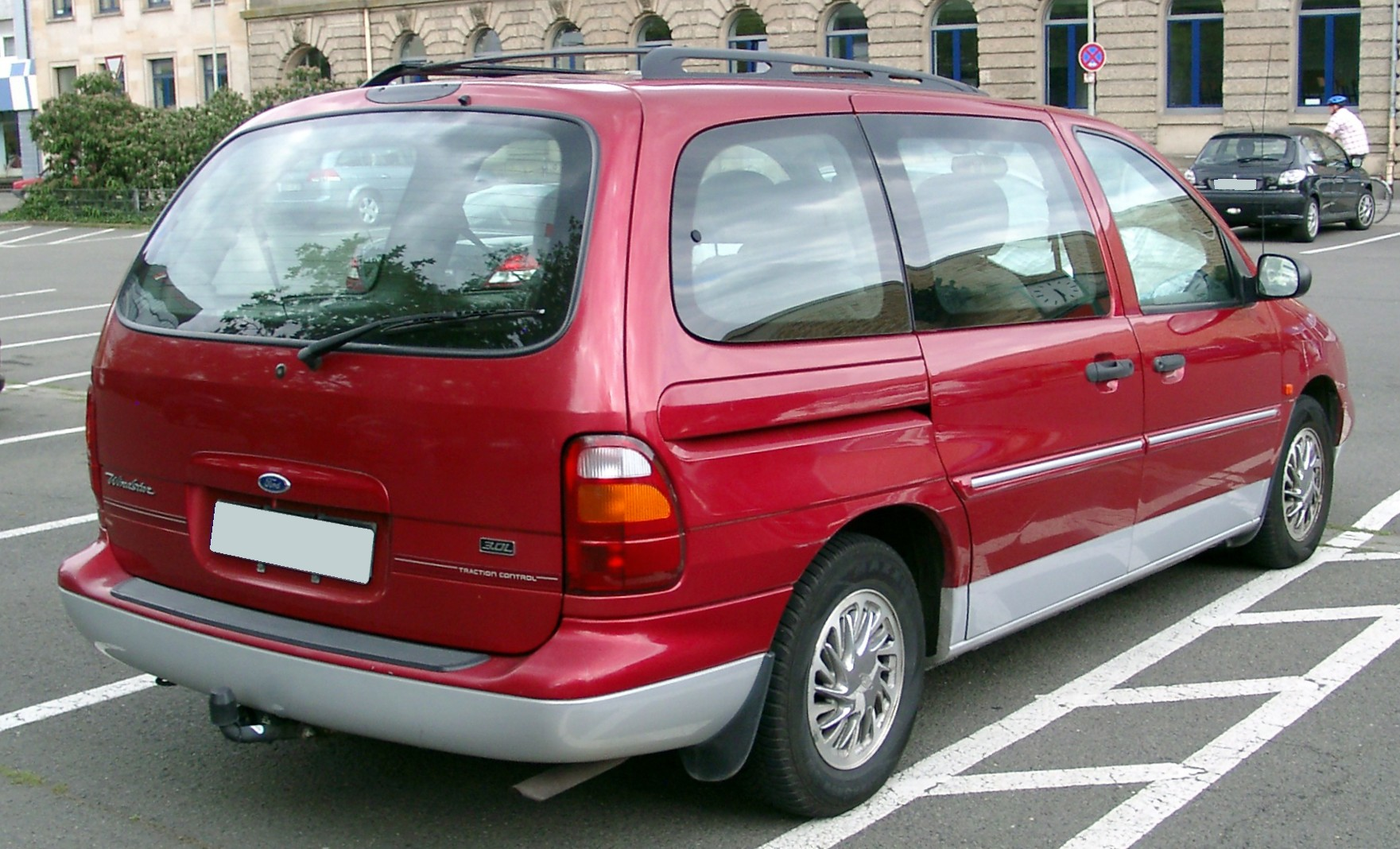
1998 Ford Windstar, rear (export)

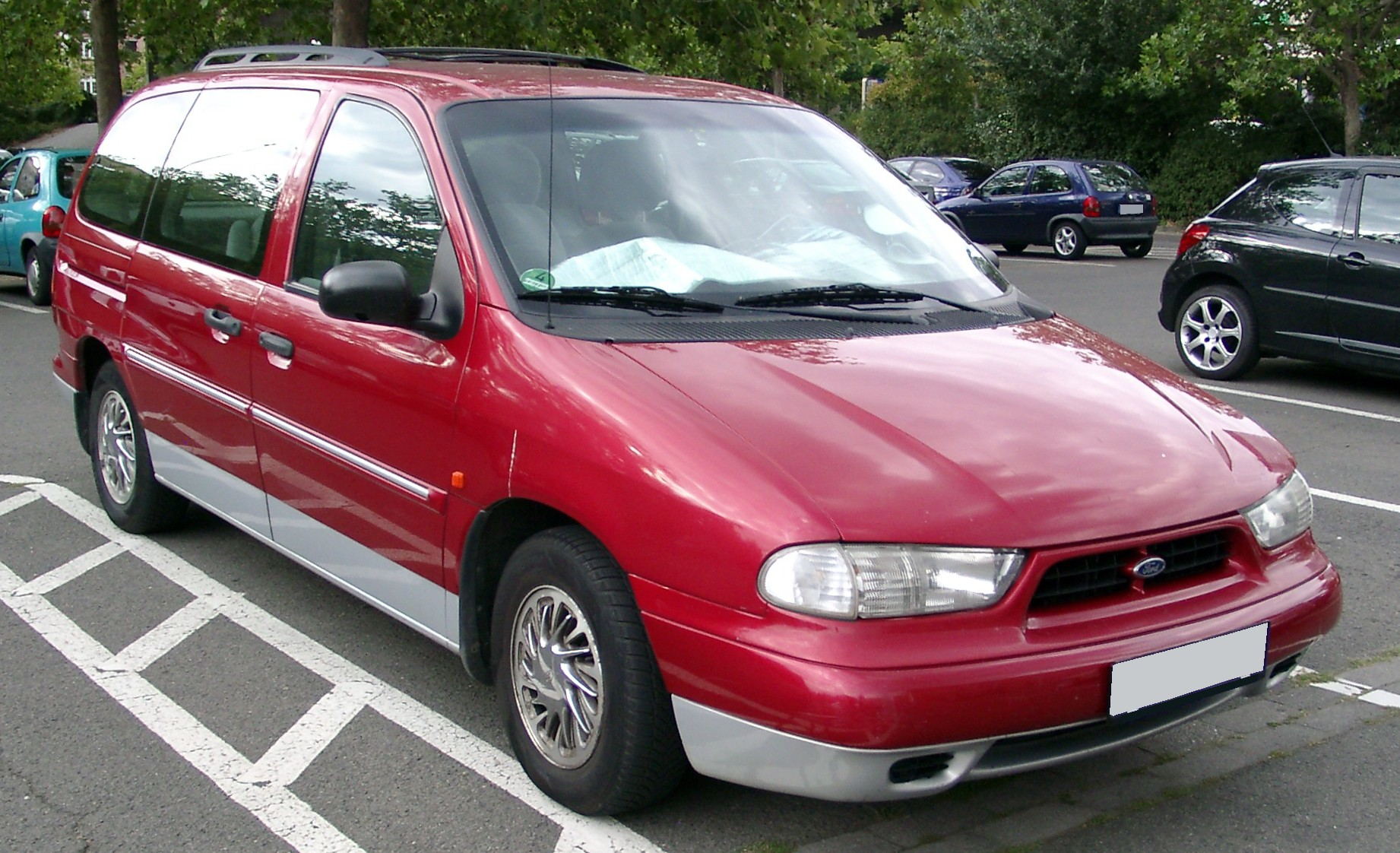
1998 Ford Windstar (export)

==== 1998 revision ====
The first-generation Windstar underwent few revisions during its production. After a shortened 1997 model year (lasting from October 1996 to January 1997), the 1998 Windstar was introduced. Coinciding with a mid-cycle revision, to compete with the introduction of driver-side sliding doors, Ford extended the driver's door and added an optional tilting/sliding driver seat. This short-term measure was called the "Family Entry System Door" in marketing, but Ford also referred to it as the "king door".

The front fascia underwent a facelift, adopting a trapezoidal grille and redesigned headlamps (with amber turn signal lenses); the optional fog lamps were moved out of the lower intake of the grille. The rear saw mild revisions, with revised tailgate badging, with larger model script and the centering of the Ford Blue Oval over the license plate). On all trim levels, new wheel covers and alloy wheel designs were introduced; the body side moldings were restyled, the GL and LX/Limited models featured specific bodyside moldings.

The interior saw a minor revision, coinciding with the addition of the tilt-slide driver's seat; the power vent switches were moved to the driver's door and an intermittent wipe was added for the rear wiper; while the dashboard remained unchanged, head restraints were added to the rear bench seats (already on rear bucket seats). Largely to make up for the retirement of the Aerostar Eddie Bauer, a "Northwoods" appearance package was offered for the GL and LX, offering leather (LX) or cloth/vinyl (GL) seats, gold-trimmed wheels, and luggage rack, and a unique two-tone exterior and bodyside moldings.

==== Features ====
While adopting the front-wheel drive form factor similar to the Chrysler minivans, the Windstar adopted several design features from the Ford Aerostar and Mercury Villager, including rear-seat audio controls, rear air conditioning and middle-row bucket seats; a digital instrument panel was coupled with a trip computer, automatic headlamps, and an auto-dimming rearview mirror. Shared with Ford sedans, the Windstar offered a keyless entry system (using a door-mounted keypad) along with an alarm system.

In contrast to its lack of a driver-side sliding door, the Windstar introduced several features to the minivan segment, including a door lock control from the rear door (unless with the family security package, the rear button was omitted.) and a wide-angle mirror in the overhead console allowing a view of the rear passenger compartment.

=== Trim ===
In line with the Aerostar and the Econoline/Club Wagon, the Windstar was sold as both a passenger van and as a cargo van. In place of using the XL/XLT nomenclature used by Ford trucks and vans, the Windstar adopted the model nomenclature used by the majority of the Ford car lineup. For retail sales, the base trim Windstar was the GL, with the Windstar LX as the flagship model.

For 1998, the Limited trim was introduced, distinguished by its monochromatic exterior and five-spoke 16-inch chrome wheels; wood interior trim was added. Slotted above both the LX and the Mercury Villager LS, the Windstar was offered with all optional features from the LX as standard.

- Cargo Van (1995–1998)
- Windstar (1996)
- Windstar 3.0L (1997–1998) - replaced unnamed base model, and included: 7 passenger seating, cloth bucket front seats, all-season tires with 15" hubcaps, air conditioning, manual locks, manual windows and an AM/FM radio with four speakers.
- Windstar GL (1995–1998) - Added: 3.8L V6 engine option, all-season tires with 15" hubcaps or optional 15" alloy wheels, manual driver's seat, speed/tilt control steering wheel, and an AM/FM radio with four speakers. Package 473A added high-capacity air-conditioning with an auxiliary heater, rear audio controls, quad command bucket seating (96 & 97), tinted windows and a luggage rack.
- Windstar LX (1995–1998) - Added: two-tone paint as a no cost option, Upgraded cloth interior (Leather Optional), rear storage bin, power locks, power windows with automatic driver's side window, 15" cast alloy rims, puddle lights, tachometer, adjustable front seats with power driver's seat, dual power lumbar support (only on Limited in 1998), a Premium AM/FM radio with cassette player and four premium speakers (JBL Audio was optional), rear audio controls, digital dash board with trip computer, automatic headlamps and auto dimming rearview mirror (Optional), Family Security Pkg.(Optional) included an alarm system, door mounted keypad, heated exterior mirrors, full automatic lighting, and a pocket for a map behind the Driver and passenger seat (Passenger Seat only for 1998). There was also a trailer towing package available which included Load-Leveling Rear Suspension, Class 3 Trailer Hitch and 4 wheel disc Brakes.
- Windstar Limited (1998) - Added: Front fog lamps, 16" cast aluminum rims, high-capacity rear air conditioner and heater, automatic headlamps, auto dimming rearview mirror, overhead console with audio controls, leather seats, keyless entry, security alarm, a premium AM/FM stereo with cassette player and four speakers. The JBL audio system was not available in 1998.

=== Safety ===
The 1995–1998 Ford Windstar, which was tested as a 1995 model received an "Excellent" (5-stars) rating from the IIHS in all marks, in which the driver survives the accident without any injuries.

It was marketed as the "safest minivan on the market".

=== Sales ===
| Calendar Year | Total American sales |
|---|---|
| 1995 | 222,147 |
| 1996 | 209,033 |
| 1997 | 205,356 |
| 1998 | 190,173 |

=== Problems ===
During and after its production, this generation of the Windstar would become known for several notable reliability issues. The 3.8 L V6 Essex engine in 1995 models was susceptible to head gasket failure, as it was in its Taurus and Sable stablemates. However, the Windstar's problem was a cast iron block with aluminum heads, coupled with higher loads than the Taurus, the van being 700 pounds heavier. In response, Ford extended the warranty on the head gasket to 100,000 miles on most Windstars with this engine. The 3.0 L V6 Vulcan engine was not susceptible to head gasket failure, as it was a completely different engine design.

The Windstar was paired with an AX4S transaxle, which was prone to internal failure. The transmission suffered from cracked forward and reverse clutch pistons. These transmission failures were most susceptible with the 3.8L engine, as the transmission could not handle the extra torque and the extra vehicle weight.

The Windstar was also plagued with various suspension woes. Due to the heft of the overall vehicle, the tierod ends required constant replacement. The front springs were prone to breaking (Covered under safety recall) in specific markets where extreme cold and heavy salt use in winter months occurred.

== Second generation (1999–2003) ==
Second generation
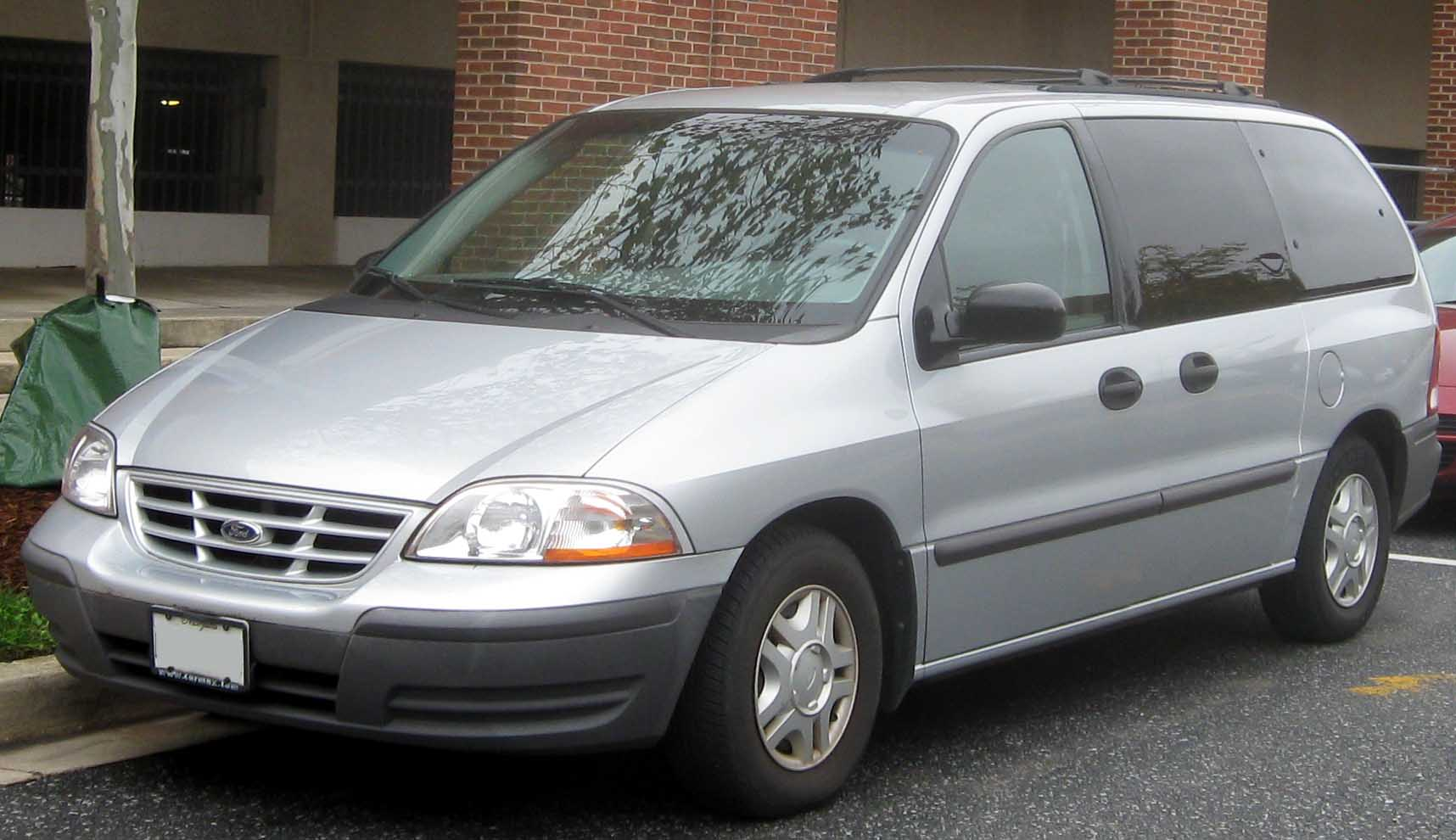
- Ford Windstar LX (1999–2000)

Overview
- Production: August 1998 – July 25, 2003
- Model years: 1999–2003
- Assembly: Canada: Oakville, Ontario (Oakville Assembly)
- Designer: Moray Callum (1996)

Body and chassis
- Body style: 3-door minivan 4-door minivan
- Platform: MV1 (WIN126)

Powertrain
- Engine: 3.0 L Vulcan V6; 3.8 L Essex V6
- Transmission: 4-speed AX4S automatic 4-speed AX4N automatic

Dimensions
- Wheelbase: 120.7 in (3,066 mm)
- Length: 200.9 in (5,103 mm); 2001–2003 Base/LX/SE/SEL/Limited: 201.5 in (5,118 mm)
- Width: 76.6 in (1,946 mm); 2001–2003 Cargo: 75.2 in (1,910 mm)
- Height: 66.1 in (1,679 mm); Cargo: 68.0 in (1,727 mm); 1999–2000 SE/SEL: 65.8 in (1,671 mm)

Released in the summer of 1998 as an early 1999 model, the Ford Windstar was given a complete redesign. As one of the first Ford vehicles in North America to adopt the New Edge styling language, the redesign also was distinguished by the addition of a driver's side sliding door.

While retaining mechanical commonality with the Taurus/Sable, Ford shifted the Windstar to a dedicated chassis architecture, introducing the Ford V platform. Several major features made their debut, including front seat-mounted side airbags on vans with VINs starting with 2FMDA, dual power-sliding doors, and rear reverse sensors.

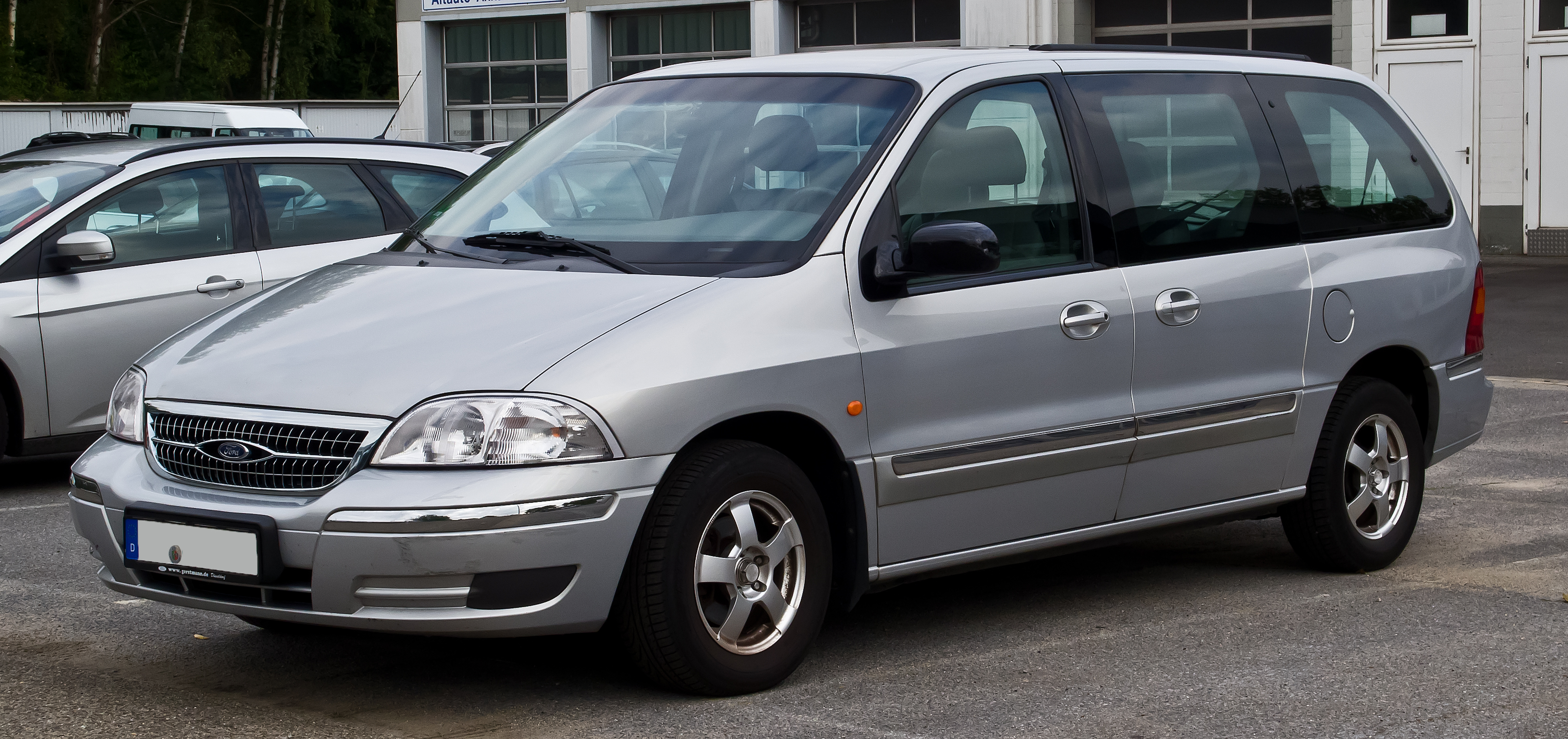

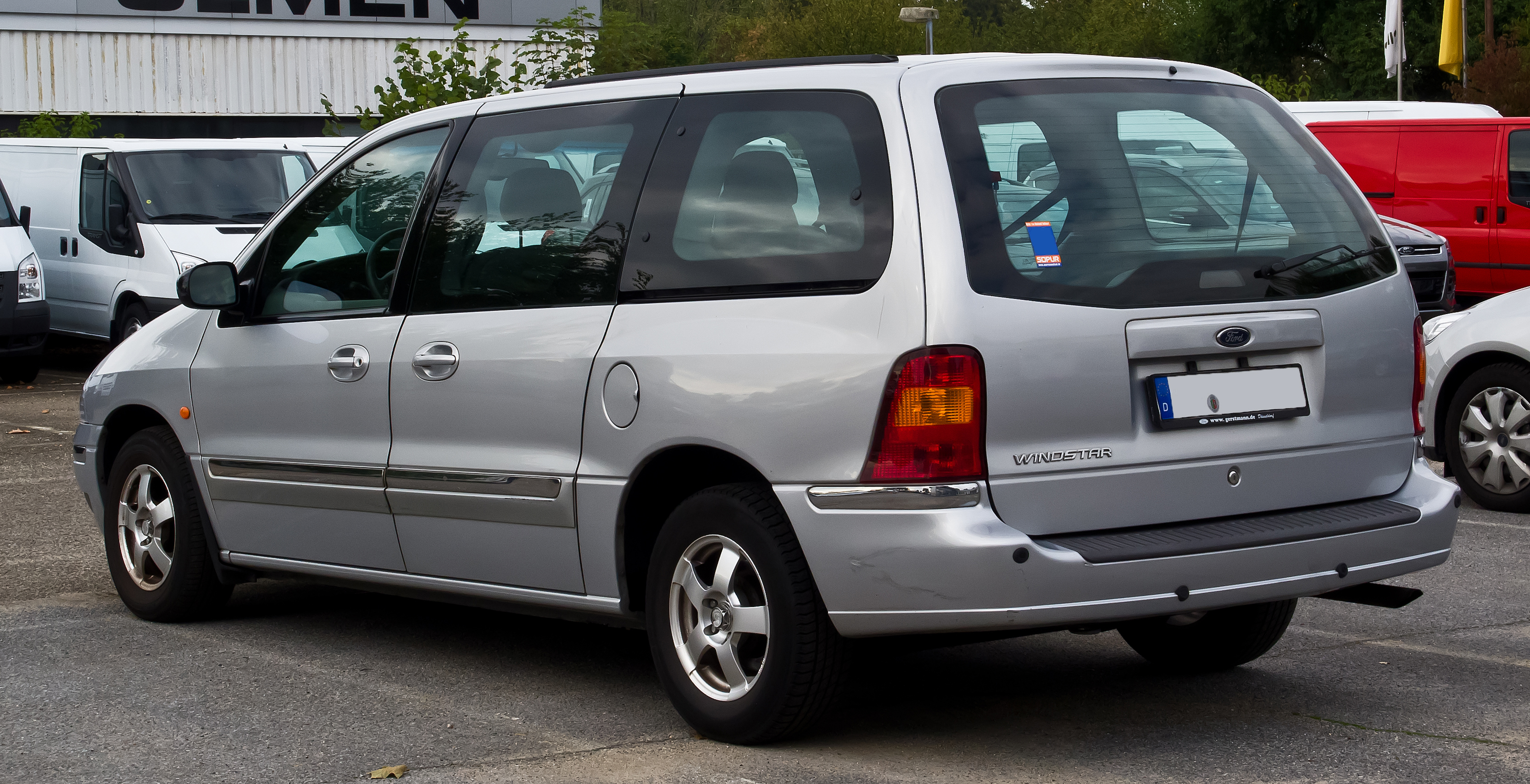
Ford Windstar (Europe)

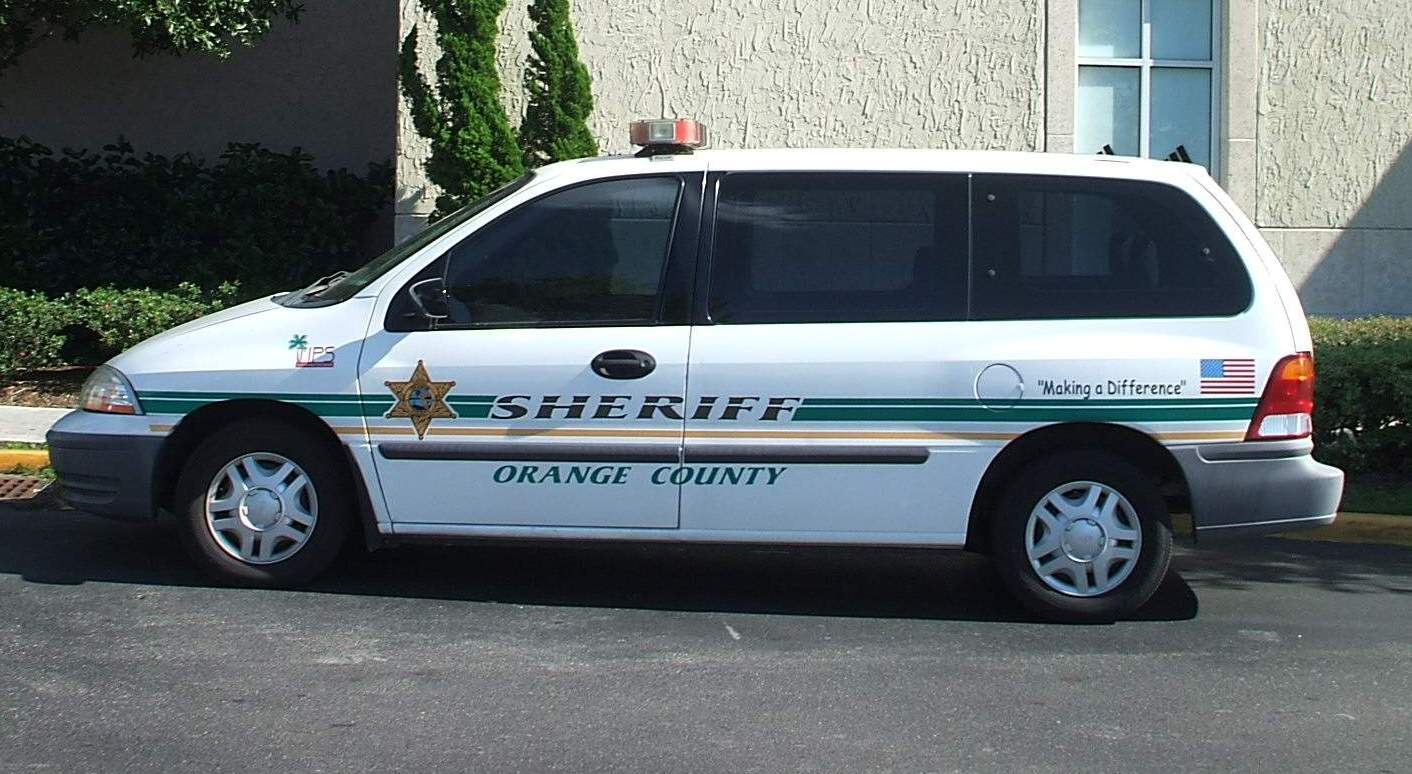
Ford Windstar used by a Floridian sheriff's office

=== Year-by-year changes ===
- 2000: The Limited model returned as the most luxurious model. A VCR-based rear-seat entertainment system featuring a flip-down LCD screen was a new option on SE, SEL, and Limited models.
- 2001: Slight cosmetic changes were made to front and rear fascias for '01. LX became the base model, and a new SE Sport model joined the lineup. The smaller 3.0 L was gone, leaving the 3.8 L as the sole engine choice. Models with 2nd row bucket seats now got their own center console. Front-seat side airbags became standard on Limiteds. The chrome grille on the SE and SEL models was redesigned. The steering wheel was updated to a more modern style, with the blue Ford Logo placed in the center. The transmission was updated to the 4F50N.
- 2002: Dual sliding doors became standard on all models. The "SE" badge was removed on Sport trims, becoming just the Windstar Sport. The grille on the Sport trim is now body colored.

The 2002 Windstar was the most dependable minivan on the market in the JD Powers dependability survey at three years in service in the 2005 survey. The Windstar beat out the Toyota Sienna and the Honda Odyssey for these honors.

- 2003: The last year of the Windstar; no major changes were made in anticipation of a 2004 redesign. In a new marketing strategy, the upcoming third-generation Windstar was rebranded as the Ford Freestar. The last Ford Windstar was produced on July 25, 2003.

=== Trim levels ===
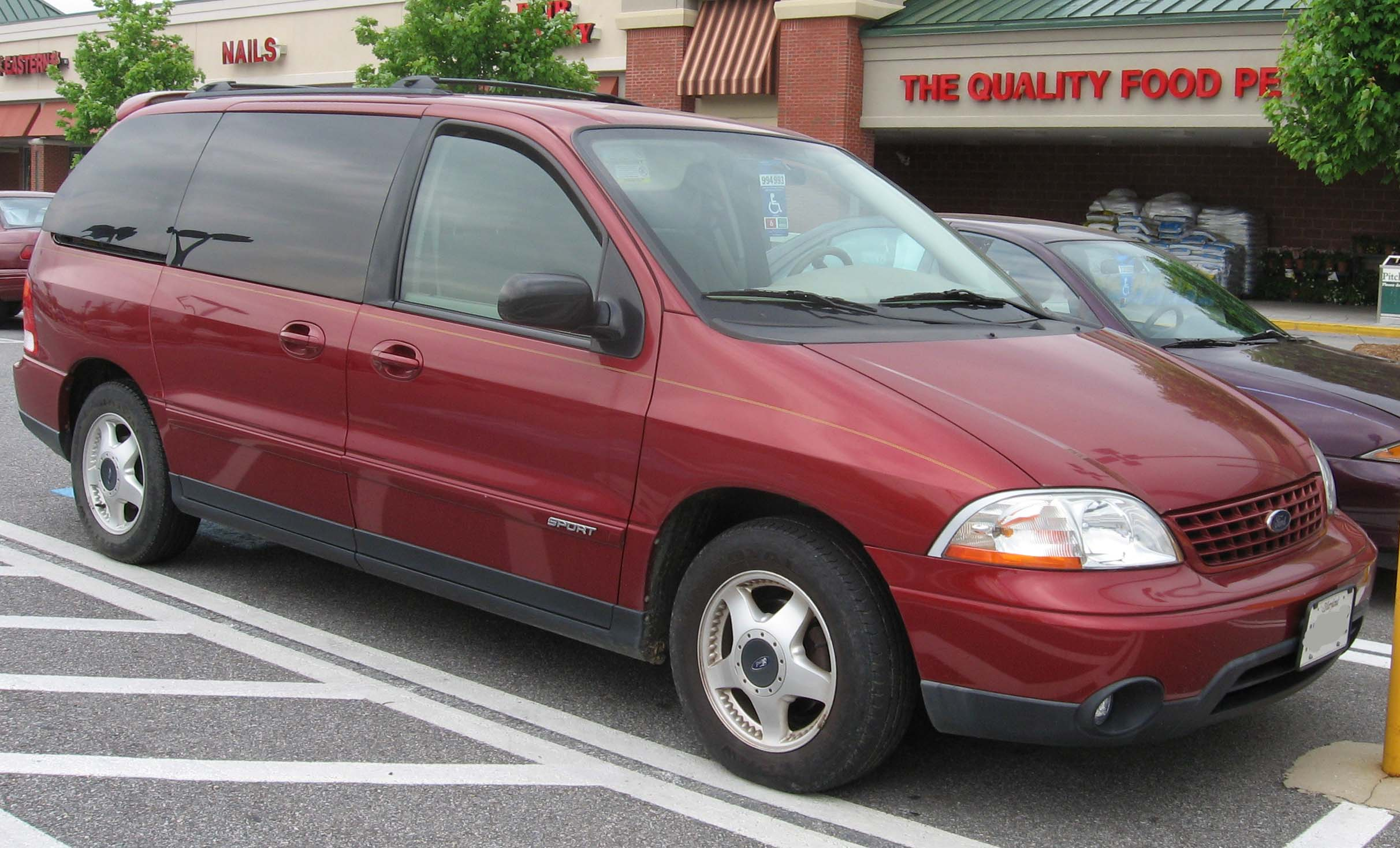
2001–2003 Ford Windstar SE Sport

In 1999, Ford began a shift in trim levels that would be seen in many of its American-market sedans through the 2000s. In place of the GL, the LX was the new base model, with the SE and SEL making their debut as the highest trim levels, respectively.

Although all versions of the Windstar wagon were sold with 7-passenger seating, LX-trim Windstars are equipped with 2nd-row bench seats; SE and SEL-trim examples are equipped with 2nd-row bucket seats.

- Cargo Van (1999–2003)
- base (1999–2000) Included: 7-passenger seating, air conditioning, power mirrors, power doors, power locks and windows with automatic driver's side window, "sleeping baby mode" lights, sliding door locks, 15" steel wheels with hubcaps, and an AM/FM stereo.
- LX (1999–2003) Included: 7 passenger-seating, air conditioning, keyless entry, 15" hubcaps, and an AM/FM radio with cassette player and clock, and overhead console. LX Deluxe added 16" alloy rims, an auxiliary climate control with rear controls, and adjustable pedals.
- SE (1999–2003) Added: cloth seats, premium AM/FM radio with cassette player (later, a single CD/cassette player) and clock, and 6-way driver's seat.
- SE Sport (2001–2002) Added: special wheels, a spoiler, ground effects, a sport specific front bumper w/ fog lights, black moldings, and for 2001 only, "SE Sport" lettering on the tailgate and doors. The trim was discontinued in the US for 2002. In Canada, it was just called the Sport, and continued until 2003.
- SEL (1999–2003) Added: automatic headlamps, heavy-duty maintenance battery, leather seats, auto-dimming rear-view mirror, message center, two-tone bumpers, and a premium AM/FM stereo with a single-CD/cassette player.
- Limited (2000–2003) Added: reverse sensing system, anti-theft system, side airbags, premium leather seats, memory driver's seat, a premium AM/FM radio with in-dash 6-disc CD player and clock, leather-wrapped steering wheel, trailer tow package, floor mats, and heated mirrors.

=== Recalls ===
==== Rear axle ====
In August 2010, Ford issued a voluntary recall of 575,000 Windstar minivans for rear axle problems. This recall followed an investigation by the National Highway Traffic Safety Administration which had begun in May 2010. The NHTSA preliminary evaluation stated the design of the rear axle beam, an inverted "U" channel design, appeared to provide a collection point for road slurry. In states which used much road salt, corrosion progressively weakened the axle until it fractured. The states covered by the recall were Connecticut, Delaware, Illinois, Indiana, Iowa, Kentucky, Maine, Maryland, Massachusetts, Michigan, Minnesota, Missouri, New Hampshire, New Jersey, New York, Ohio, Pennsylvania, Rhode Island, Utah, Vermont, West Virginia and Wisconsin, as well as Washington D.C. In May 2012, 27,000 of the minivans from Virginia were added to the axle recall, bringing the overall total to more than 600,000 vehicles between the U.S. and Canada.

A class action lawsuit was filed against Ford Motor Company in May 2010 proceeding Ford's recall. This lawsuit was filed by Plaintiff Aaron Martin against Defendant Ford Motor Company. In this lawsuit, documents were introduced which showed Ford's testing of the Benteler Axle in March 1998 resulted in failure of two out of the eleven axles tested. In August 1998, Ford determined the cause of this failure was improper heat treating. In September 1998, the axle manufacturer Bentley Automotive agreed with Ford's findings. In October 1999, Ford's internal documents show lab testing proved the axle life could be doubled by heat treating, but would require initial retooling cost and result in $3.45 piece cost increase. No changes were made until March 2003.

==== Subframe corrosion ====
In March 2011, the National Highway Traffic Safety Administration and Ford announced another Ford Windstar recall over corrosion concerns. 425,288 of the model year 1999–2003 Windstar vans originally sold or currently registered in some cold weather states are part of the recall. The problem involves rusting of the subframe. Most of the corrosion occurs on the passenger side of the subframe. If the subframe collapses while driving, the vehicle could potentially lose all steering control and end up in an accident. According to the NHTSA action #PE10026, some Ford Windstar owners had their drive axle detach from the transmission. Ford is offering alternative transportation to owners if their vehicle is unsafe to drive. If the minivan can't be repaired, Ford will repurchase the vehicle.

=== IIHS crash test results ===
The 1999–2003 Ford Windstar received an "Acceptable" rating by the IIHS for fair structural performance, moderate injuries to the left foot, and fair dummy control. Although most redesigned vehicles outperform their predecessors to cut down insurance costs and possible injuries to the driver, this generation Windstar did not perform as well as its first generation predecessor. The NHTSA graded the minivan an overall rating of 5 stars in both the frontal and side impact tests.

=== Yearly U.S. sales ===
| Calendar year | Total U.S. sales |
|---|---|
| 1999 | 213,844 |
| 2000 | 222,298 |
| 2001 | 179,595 |
| 2002 | 148,875 |
| 2003 | 113,465 |

== Third generation (Ford Freestar; 2004–2007) ==
Ford Freestar/Mercury Monterey
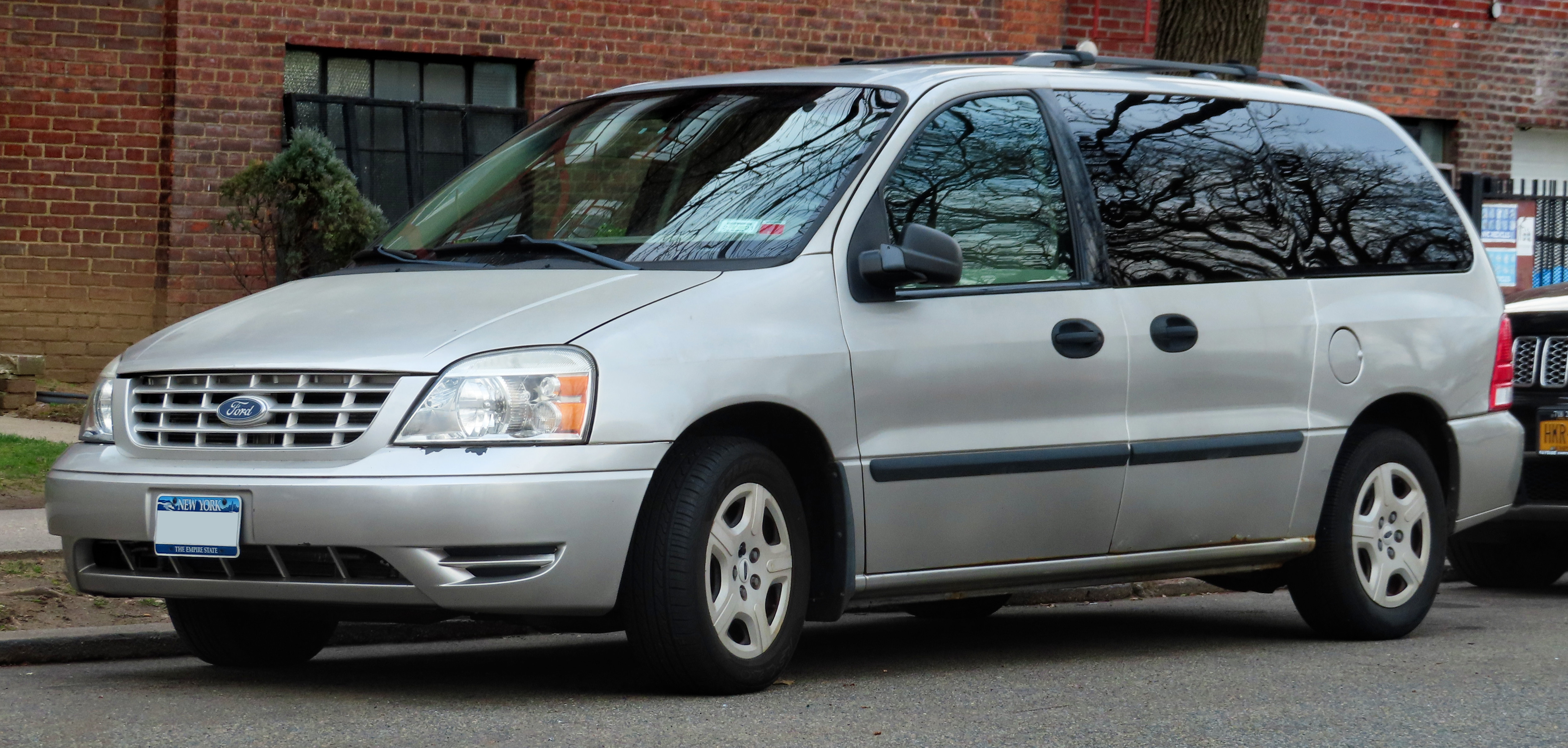
- Ford Freestar (2004–2007)

Overview
- Also called: Mercury Monterey
- Production: 2003 – December 29, 2006
- Model years: 2004–2007
- Assembly: Canada: Oakville, Ontario (Oakville Assembly)

Body and chassis
- Body style: 5-door minivan
- Platform: MV1

Powertrain
- Engine: 3.9 L Essex V6; 4.2 L Essex V6
- Transmission: 4-speed 4F50N automatic

Dimensions
- Wheelbase: 120.8 in (3,068 mm)
- Length: 201.0 in (5,105 mm)
- Width: 2004–2006: 76.4 in (1,941 mm); 2006–2007: 76.6 in (1,946 mm)
- Height: 68.8 in (1,748 mm); 2006–07 SE, SEL & Limited: 70.6 in (1,793 mm)

Chronology
- Predecessor: Ford Windstar; Mercury Villager (for Monterey)
- Successor: Ford Flex; Ford Freestyle/Taurus X

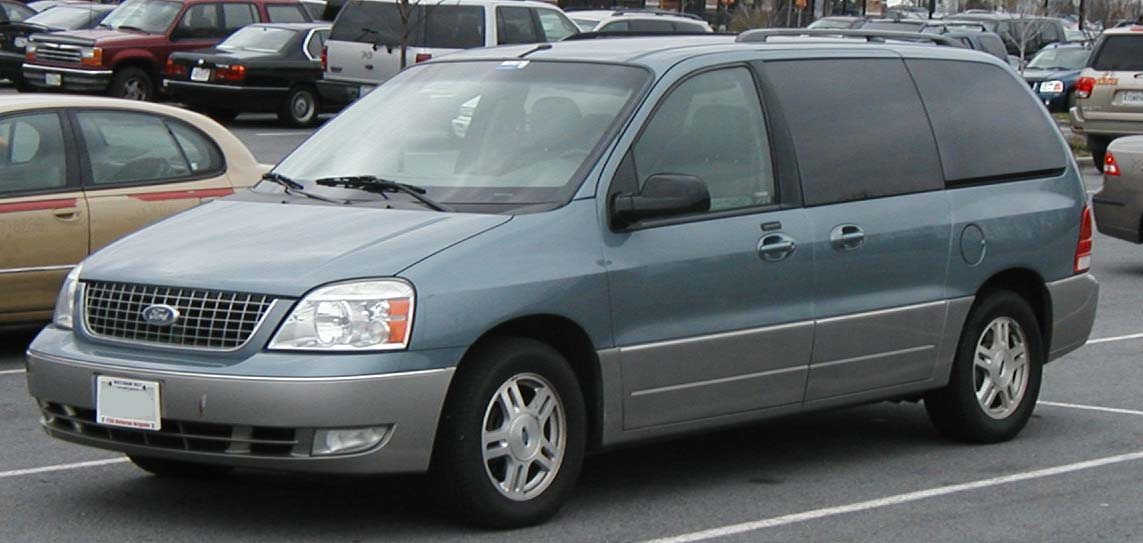
Ford Freestar Limited

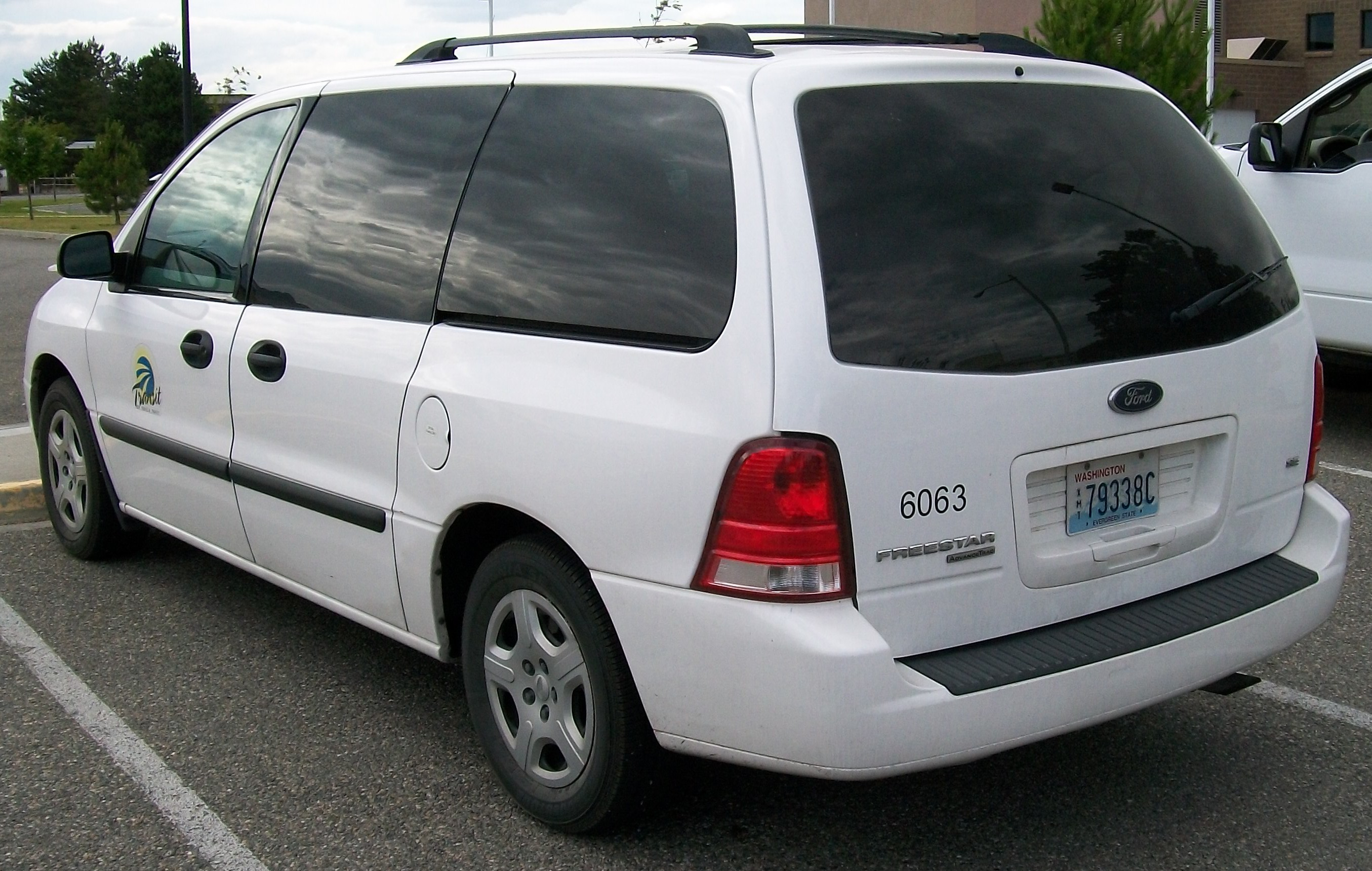
Ford Freestar SE, rear view.

The third-generation Ford Windstar was released for the 2004 model year, becoming the Ford Freestar. Moving away from the New Edge styling language of the previous generation (though much of the roofline was retained), designers styled the Freestyle in line with updated Ford sedans, station wagons and SUVs, including the Ford Explorer, Ford Freestyle, and Ford Five Hundred. In another major change, the new generation became the first Ford-designed minivan marketed by Lincoln-Mercury, as Mercury replaced the Villager by the Mercury Monterey (see below).

Alongside the evolutionary updates to the exterior, the interior saw multiple updates of its own. The curved dashboard layout of the two previous generations was abandoned entirely, sharing much of its design with the then-upcoming Ford Five Hundred (with the primary exception of its column-shifted transmission). In a functional change, the third-row seat was redesigned to stow into the floor, and optionally fold backwards (creating a rear-facing "tailgating" seat with the liftgate open). Following their standardization in 2002, the Freestar was the first Ford minivan produced solely with dual sliding doors.

While sharing the same MV1 platform as the second-generation Windstar, the primary initiative of the $600 million redesign focused on driveline reliability, an issue that had plagued the Windstar since its 1994 introduction. In its development, the Freestar saw the addition of heavier-duty drive axles, larger wheel bearings, and the standardization of four-wheel disc brakes. The 3.0L and 3.8L V6 engines were both retired in favor of two new engines (both developed from the 3.8L V6). The standard engine (offered only in the United States) was a 193hp 3.9L, shared with the Ford Mustang; a 201hp 4.2L V6 was offered as an option. The 4.2L was made standard in all vans in the late 2007 model year after the 3.9L ceased production, and all Canada and export vehicles.

As part of the initiative to improve driveline reliability, the 4-speed automatic transmission saw upgrades for improved shifting and reliability. Despite that, transmission failures were still common. NHTSA launched an investigation into the 2004 and 2005 Freestar and Monterey due to numerous complaints with regard to the equipped 4F50N transmission. Although the investigation is centered on the torque converter, specifically the failure of the torque converter spline shaft, these failures often required the entire transaxle be rebuilt or replaced. Ford later recalled 2004 and 2005 Freestars and Montereys to have the torque converter replaced free of charge, although 2006-2007 models still suffered from torque converter problems, despite not being recalled.

=== Trim levels ===
The Freestar carried much of the trim lineup from the Windstar, with two exceptions. The "LX" and "Sport" trim levels were dropped in favor of the "SES" and "S" trims.

- S (2004 and 2005) Included: cloth upholstery, 3.9L V6 engine, 16" steel rims with hubcaps, keyless entry, an AM/FM stereo, power locks, power windows with automatic driver's side window, adjustable pedals, power points, and manual sliding doors.
- SE (2004–2007) Included: 3.9L V6 engine (4.2L V6 engine in late 2007 models), three-row seating, rear air conditioning (on 2006 and 2007 models), an AM/FM radio with single-CD player and digital clock and four speakers, power mirrors, locks and windows, tinted rear windows, keyless entry, and 16" steel rims with hubcaps.
- SES (2004 and 2005) Added: 16" sport alloy rims, tri-zone air conditioning, and power driver's seat.
- SEL (2004–2007) Added: 4.2L V6 engine, 6-way power driver's seat, overhead console, leather-wrapped steering wheel with audio controls, an AM/FM stereo with single-CD and cassette players (cassette removed in 2006) and clock, rear seat audio controls, high-capacity air-conditioning, and 16" alloy rims.
- Limited (2004–2007) Added: 3rd row reading lights, an AM/FM stereo with single CD/Cassette players (later, AM/FM stereo with single-CD player with speed-sensitive volume and rear audio controls), analog clock, turn signal mirrors, cornering lamps, message center, power-sliding doors, automatic climate control, and 17" alloy rims (later, 16" clad alloy rims).

=== IIHS crash test results ===
The 2004–2007 Ford Freestar received an "Good" rating in the offset frontal crash test from the IIHS and outperformed the 1999–2003 Ford Windstar, but resulted in moderate injuries only on the head and neck.

In the side-impact tests, it received a "Poor" rating without the optional side airbags for poor structural performance, potential head and neck injuries, and high forces on the driver's torso, but fared better with the side airbags, earning an overall "Acceptable" rating, but resulted in a moderate head and neck injury to the driver.

=== Yearly American sales ===
| Calendar Year | Freestar | Monterey |
|---|---|---|
| 2003 | 15,771 | 2,213 |
| 2004 | 100,622 | 17,407 |
| 2005 | 77,585 | 8,166 |
| 2006 | 50,125 | 4,467 |
| 2007 | 2,390 | 700 |

=== Awards ===
In 2009, the 2005 Freestar scored second place in J.D. Power's Vehicle Dependability Study, behind the Dodge Caravan.

=== Mercury Monterey ===
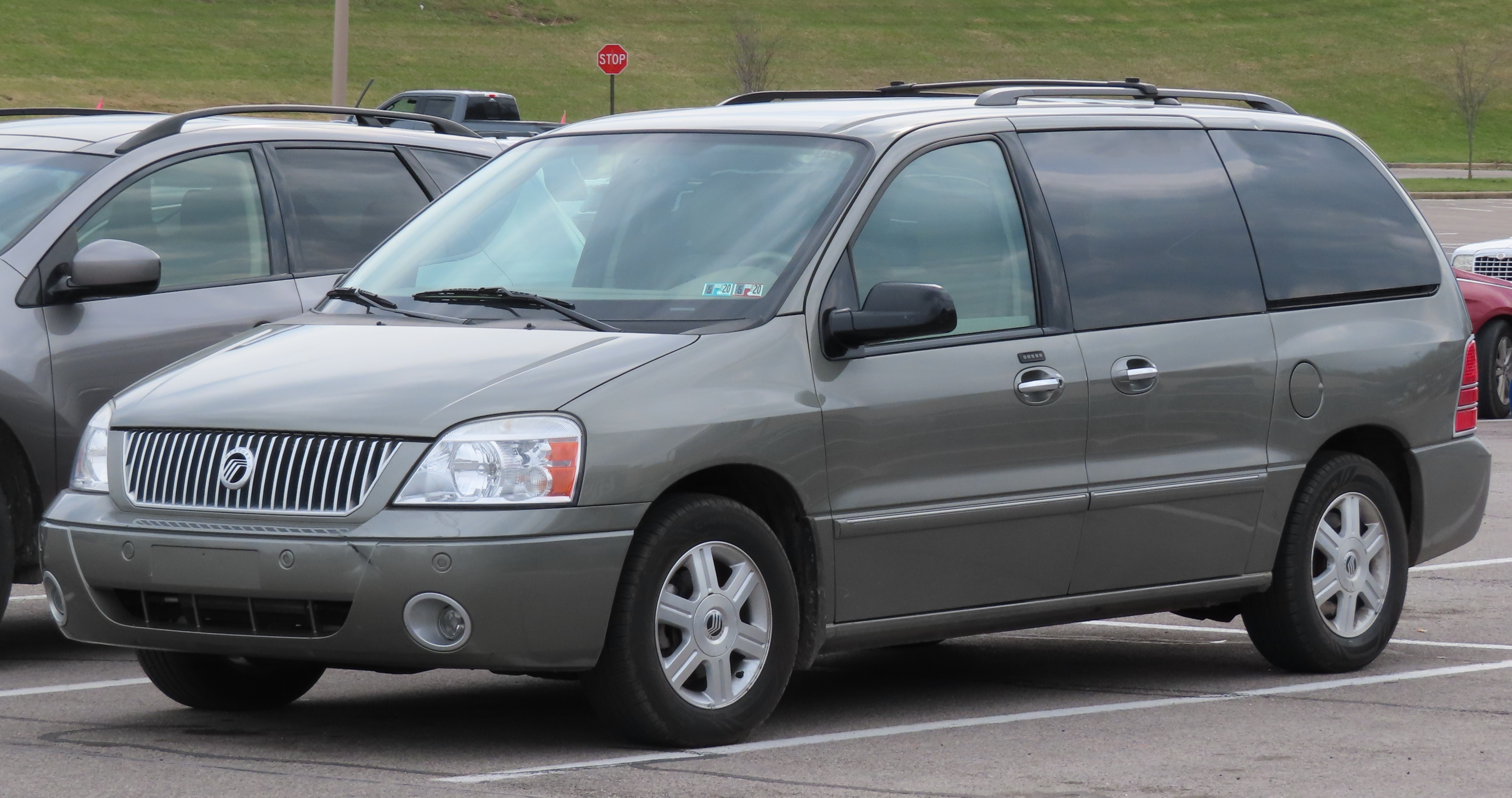
Mercury Monterey

For the 2004 model year, Ford marketed a direct Mercury counterpart of its minivan line for the first time with the introduction of the Mercury Monterey (replacing the Mercury Villager). Taking its name from the 1950-1974 Mercury sedan, the Monterey gave the division a direct competitor for the Chrysler Town & Country for the first time, also competing with the Buick Terraza (which replaced the Oldsmobile Silhouette) and the highest trims of the Honda Odyssey and Toyota Sienna.

In line with the Freestar, the Monterey was styled in line with other Mercury vehicles, adopting a resemblance to the Montego and Mountaineer; the interior was styled similar to the Montego (adopting wood trim closer in line to the Grand Marquis). In line with the later Mariner, Milan, and Montego, three trim levels were offered for the Monterey: Convenience, Luxury, and Premier. Features such as power-sliding doors and a rear-seat DVD player were available on Luxury and Premier trim lines. Unique to the Premier was the option of heated and cooled front seats, a class exclusive at the time.

Differing slightly from its Ford counterpart, the Monterey was fitted solely with the 4.2L V6 engine.

Sales of the Monterey fell far under projections, driven primarily by an overall decline of the minivan segment in North America. In total, 32,195 examples were sold over its three-year production run.

== Replacement ==
After selling far under sales projections, Ford discontinued the Freestar and Monterey after the 2007 model year. The final Monterey was produced by Oakville Assembly on August 25, 2006; the final Freestar was produced on December 29, 2006. In all markets outside North America, Ford largely replaced the Freestar with the V185 Ford Transit/Tourneo (front-wheel drive); the model line was also introduced in Mexico.

In North America, Ford became the first American manufacturer to withdraw from the minivan segment entirely; after 32 years, Ford shifted three-row vehicle production from minivans to CUVs, with the Ford Freestyle (effectively, the Five Hundred station wagon) renamed as the Ford Taurus X. For 2009, Ford introduced the Ford Flex wagon; while more "van-like" than the Taurus X, it was again fitted with four forward-opening doors.

For 2010, Ford began imports of the Ford Transit Connect compact MPV from Turkey. While imported as a passenger van (to circumvent American tariff laws), the model line was primarily intended for sale as a cargo vehicle; most examples were refurbished for cargo use before dealer sale. As part of a 2014 redesign, the Transit Connect (sourced from Spain) gained a long-wheelbase version, with Ford offering a 7-passenger van for the first time since 2007. Though much smaller in exterior size (closer in length to the 1989-1997 extended Aerostar), the Transit Connect LWB shares a nearly identical wheelbase with the Ford Windstar/Freestar. After 2023, imports of the Transit Connect ended; the current generation (sourced from Volkswagen) is not imported to North America by Ford.
