= Ford Vulcan engine =

Ford Vulcan V6
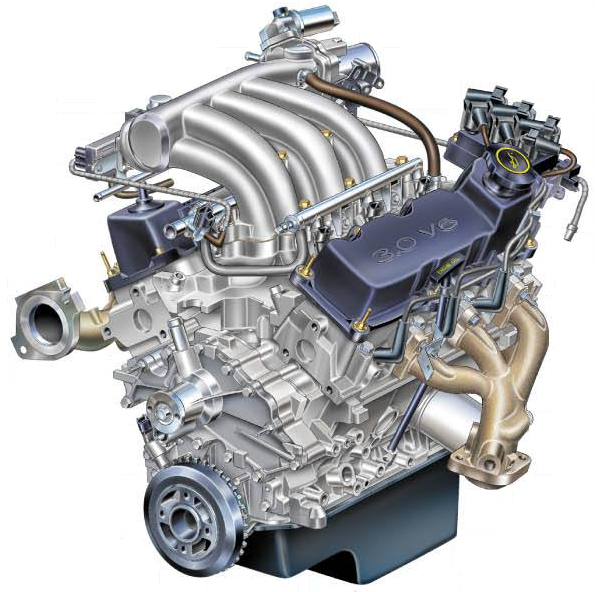

Overview
- Manufacturer: Ford Motor Company
- Production: 1986–2008

Layout
- Configuration: Naturally aspirated 60° V6
- Displacement: 2,986 cc (182.2 cu in)
- Cylinder bore: 89 mm (3.504 in)
- Piston stroke: 80 mm (3.150 in)
- Cylinder block material: Cast iron
- Cylinder head material: Cast iron
- Valvetrain: 2 overhead valves per cylinder, pushrods, rocker arms.
- Compression ratio: 9.3:1 (1986–2003); 9.5:1 (2004–2007)

Combustion
- Fuel system: Electronic fuel injection
- Management: EEC-IV
- Fuel type: Gasoline; E85 Ethanol-gasoline blend
- Oil system: Wet sump
- Cooling system: Water-cooled

Output
- Power output: 130–153 hp (97–114 kW)
- Torque output: 160–186 lb⋅ft (217–252 N⋅m)

Chronology
- Predecessor: Ford Cologne V6 engine
- Successor: Duratec 3.0 L

The Ford Vulcan is a 3.0 L V6 engine designed and built by the Ford Motor Company. It debuted in 1986 in the newly launched Ford Taurus. Ford went on to install the Vulcan V6 in a variety of car, van, and pickup truck models until the 2008 model year, after which production stopped.

== History ==
The Vulcan V6 engine was developed as part of Ford's plan to produce a successor to their mid-size LTD and Marquis sedans and wagons. The project was led by vice president and head of product planning and research Lewis Veraldi. Originally called Sigma, the project was renamed DN5 and resulted in the 1986 Ford Taurus and Mercury Sable.

A straight-four engine was specified early on, possibly from a supplier outside of Ford, with no provision for a V8 and no expectation that a V6 would be needed. As work progressed, the future car's size and weight increased to the point where a V6 of 2.8 L was added to the powertrain options. Neither of Ford's existing V6 engines were appropriate for this use; their 3.8 L Essex V6 was too wide and produced excessive vibration, while their 2.8 L Cologne V6 was too large and heavy. Two years into the project, Thomas Howard was chosen to head up internal engine development.

Performance goals were set for both the car and its engine. The car was to be able to accelerate from 0–60 mph (0–97 km/h) in a maximum time of 11.5 seconds. The engine was to develop no less than 130 hp (97 kW), travel 7,500 mi (12,100 km) before requiring an oil change, go 100,000 mi (161,000 km) before requiring major maintenance, run for five minutes after a major cooling system failure, and offer a "limp home" mode. Market studies indicated that American buyers were more interested in having a reliable, low maintenance engine than in owning a sophisticated engine for its own sake.

The resulting engine was a clean-sheet, all metric design. The engine's 60° vee angle was chosen to help it fit into the Taurus' engine bay. Displacement grew from an original 2.8 L to 3.0 L. A variety of technologies were evaluated during development, including two different fuel injection systems, turbocharging, two sparkplugs per cylinder, variable displacement with cylinder deactivation, and Ford's experimental programmed combustion (PROCO) system.

Ford's parts and service division asked that the oil filter, sparkplugs, oil dipstick be up front and accessible, and that key underhood touchpoints be colored yellow for easy identification. The appearance of the engine was also important. The intake, for instance, was engineered with aesthetics in mind, though the design had the side effect of allowing it to flow more air.

The engine block was cast at Ford's Cleveland Casting Plant with tooling built by Sherwood Metal Products, while the intake came from Ford's Essex Aluminum Casting. Engine machining and assembly took place at Ford's Lima engine plant in Lima, Ohio.

In the spring of 1982 the first forty prototype engines blocks were cast, all of which cracked when they were assembled. In their efforts to produce a lightweight block, Ford's engineers had designed a very rigid structure whose walls had been made very thin, which caused the cracking.

Some early engines were installed in front wheel drive Chevrolet Celebritys. Later test engines were installed in a group of Ford LTDs and Mercury Marquis. These were driven approximately 100,000 mi (161,000 km), roughly twice the usual test distance, and evaluated in both hot and cold environments. Another set of about thirty prototype engines were installed in a fleet of trucks that logged between 100,000 and 200,000 mi (161,000 and 322,000 km), after which the engines were torn down and inspected, deficiencies noted and parts redesigned, after which the engines were remanufactured and returned to service for a second phase of testing.

The Vulcan was the only engine available in the Taurus when it launched; Ford introduced the 2.5 L (152.6 cu in) HSC inline four as the base engine on certain models late in the Taurus' first year and later offered a model with a 5-speed manual transmission. By the end of its first year of sales, the Taurus was offered in four trim levels: L, MT-5, GL, LX. The standard engine in the L and GL sedans and the only engine offered in the MT-5 sedan and wagon was the HSC four cylinder. The Vulcan was optional in the L and GL sedans, and standard in the L and GL wagons and all LX models. While the HSC engine could be paired with either the 3-speed Ford ATX transmission in the L, or the 5-speed MTX-III manual transmission in the MT-5, the only transmission available for Vulcan equipped models was the newly developed 4-speed AXOD automatic.

In 1992 the 2.5 L HSC four cylinder was dropped from the Taurus line, and the Vulcan became the car's base engine, and later the only engine offered in the 2006–2007 model years. It was also used in the Ford Probe, the Ford Tempo and Mercury Topaz from 1992 to 1994 (optional, but standard in the 1992 GLS, XR5, and LTS models, respectively), the Ford Aerostar and Ford Windstar minivans, and the Ford Ranger and Mazda B3000 pickup trucks. The 3.0 L Vulcan replaced Ford's 2.9 L German Cologne V6 as the base V6 in the Ranger. The last production vehicle available with the Vulcan V6 was the 2008 Ford Ranger.

Although it shared the Vulcan V6's general layout, 60° cylinder bank angle, bore, stroke, bore spacing, and a few minor components, the SHO V6 was an engine designed and built by Yamaha with new DOHC cylinder heads and a redesigned, strengthened engine block.

Applications:

- 1986–1997 Ford Aerostar
- 1986–2007 Ford Taurus
- 1986–2005 Mercury Sable
- 1990–1992 Ford Probe
- 1991–2008 Ford Ranger
- 1992–1994 Ford Tempo
- 1992–1994 Mercury Topaz
- 1994–2007 Mazda B3000
- 1995–2000 Ford Windstar

== Features ==
The Vulcan's block and cylinder heads are of cast iron, with a 60° angle between cylinder banks. It has a single cam-in-block and two overhead valves per cylinder operated by pushrods and rocker arms. Bore and stroke measurements are 89 mm × 80 mm (3.504 in × 3.150 in), for a total displacement of 2,986.14 cc (182.23 cu in). When it debuted in the 1986 Taurus, the Vulcan developed 140 hp (104.4 kW) at 4800 rpm, 10 horsepower more than the design specification, and 160 lb⋅ft (216.9 N⋅m) of torque at 3000 rpm. Power output was as high as 153 hp (114.1 kW) at 4900 rpm in the 2007 Taurus, and as low as 130 hp (96.9 kW) at 4800 rpm in the 1992 Tempo.

Designed from the start to use electronic fuel injection, no Vulcans left the factory fitted with a carburetor. The engine is managed by Ford's EEC-IV engine control unit (ECU).

The Vulcan was also available in a "flexible fuel" (flex fuel) configuration that could burn normal gasoline, the E85 blend of 15% gasoline and 85% ethanol, or any mix of the two.

Over the course of its production life the engine received many internal upgrades, including roller lifters (1992), a five counterweight crankshaft (1995), a reinforced block (1995, 2002), and longer head bolts (1999) among other changes. In 1993 the flex fuel Vulcan received Ford's coil pack based Electronic Distributorless Ignition System (EDIS), which the gasoline fueled version received in 1996.

== Gallery ==
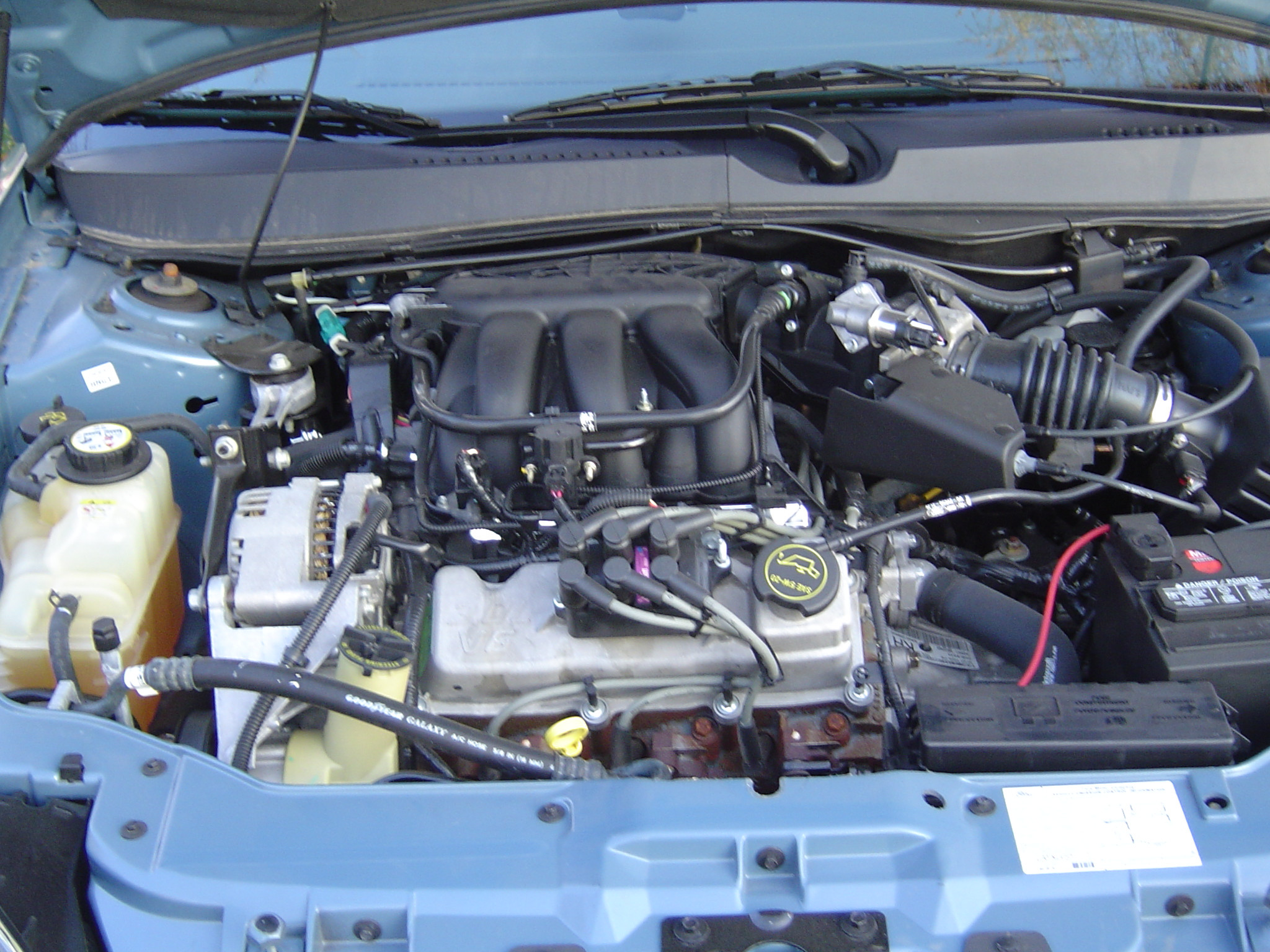
Flex fuel Vulcan V6 in a 2005 Taurus.

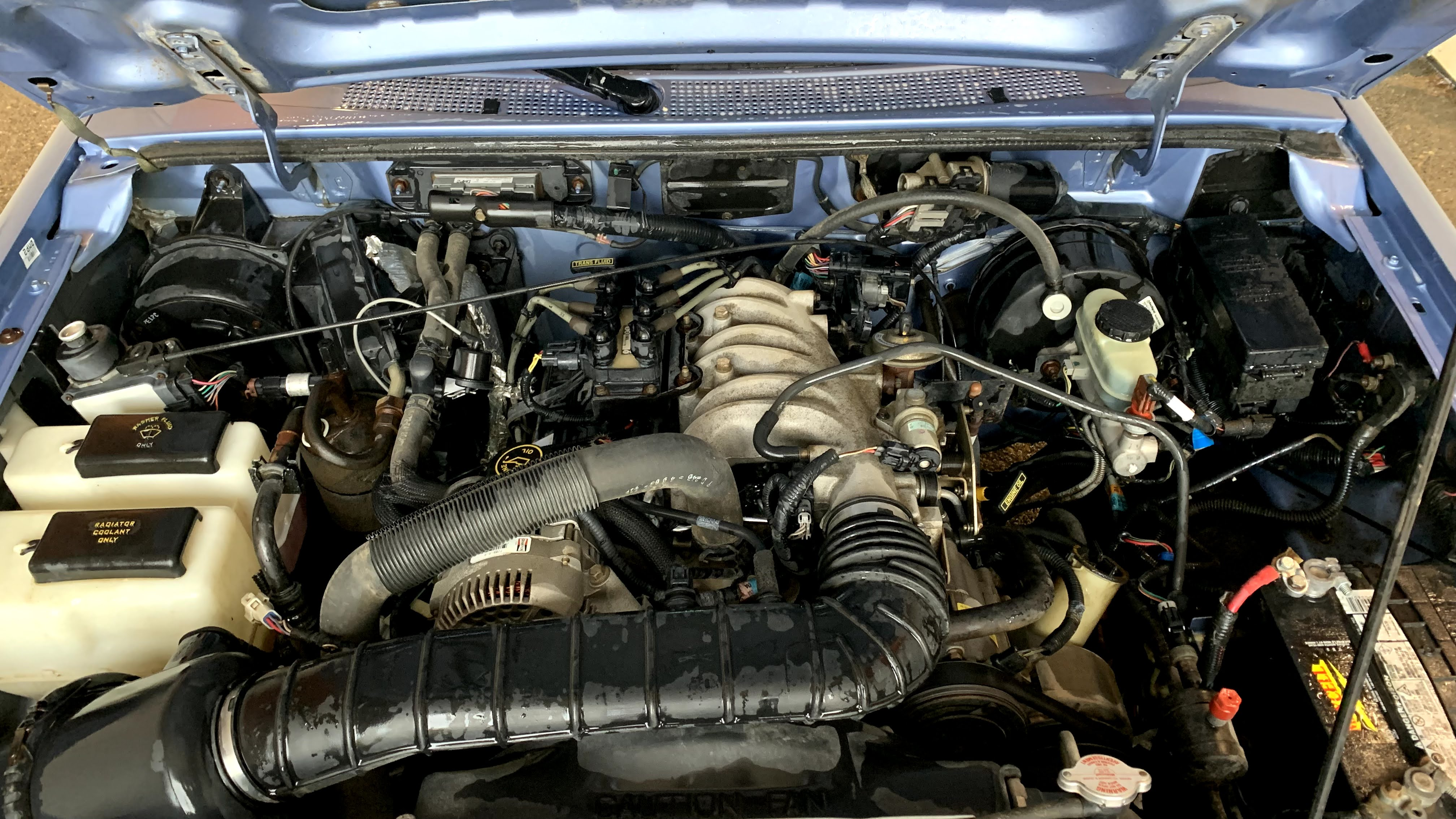
Vulcan in a 1997 Ranger

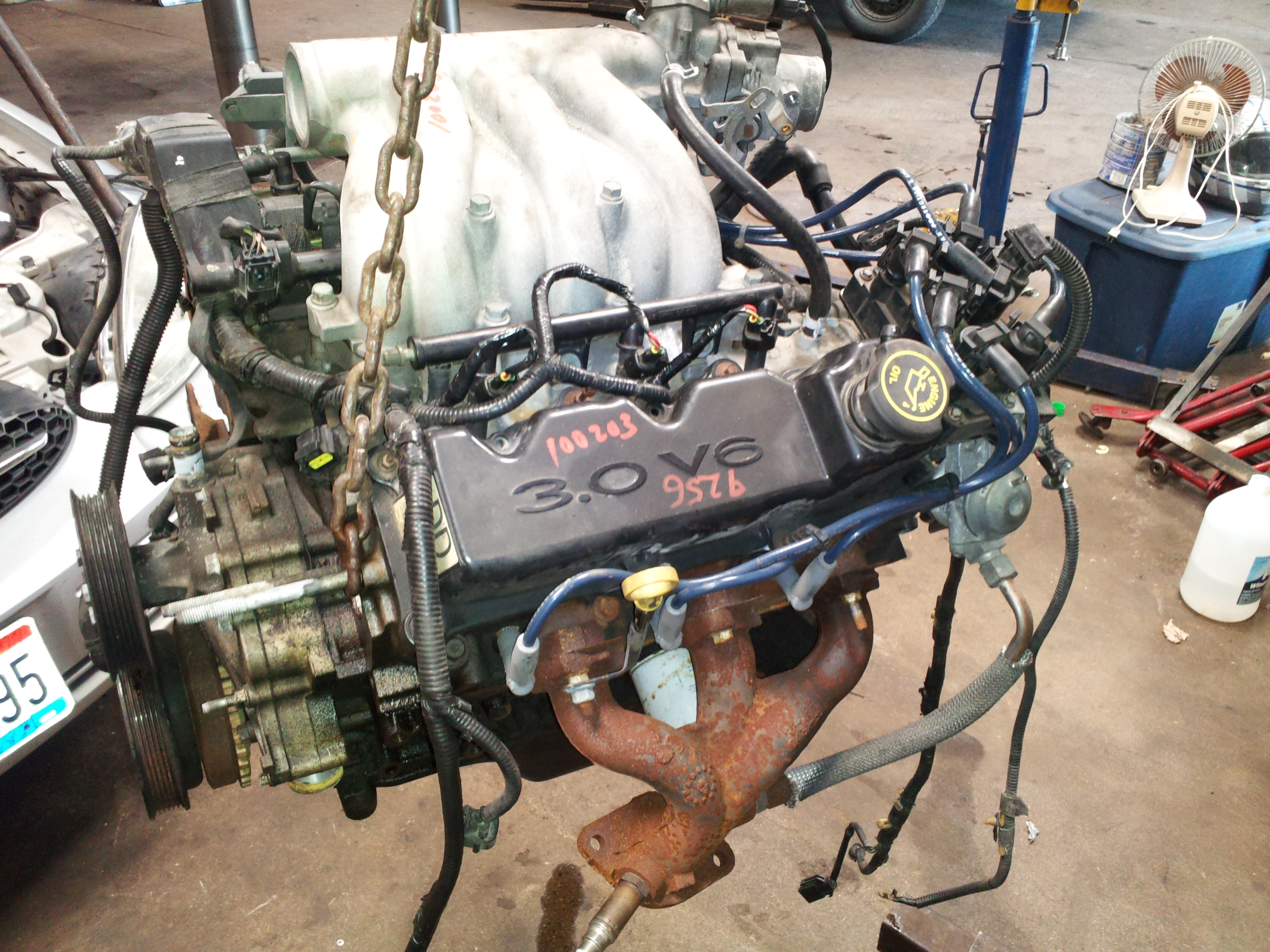
3.0 L Ford Vulcan V6 engine.

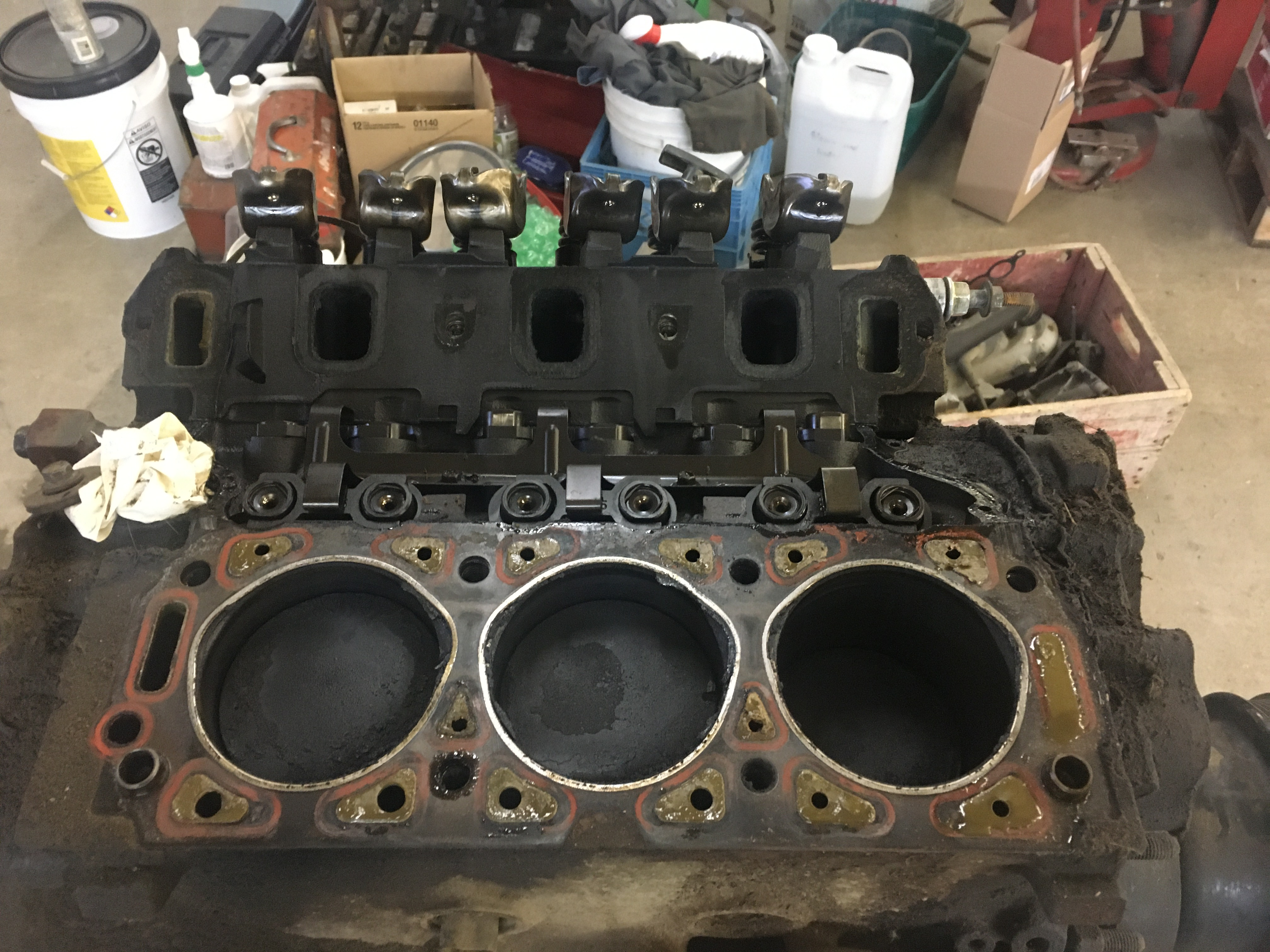
Valve reliefs are cast directly into the block.

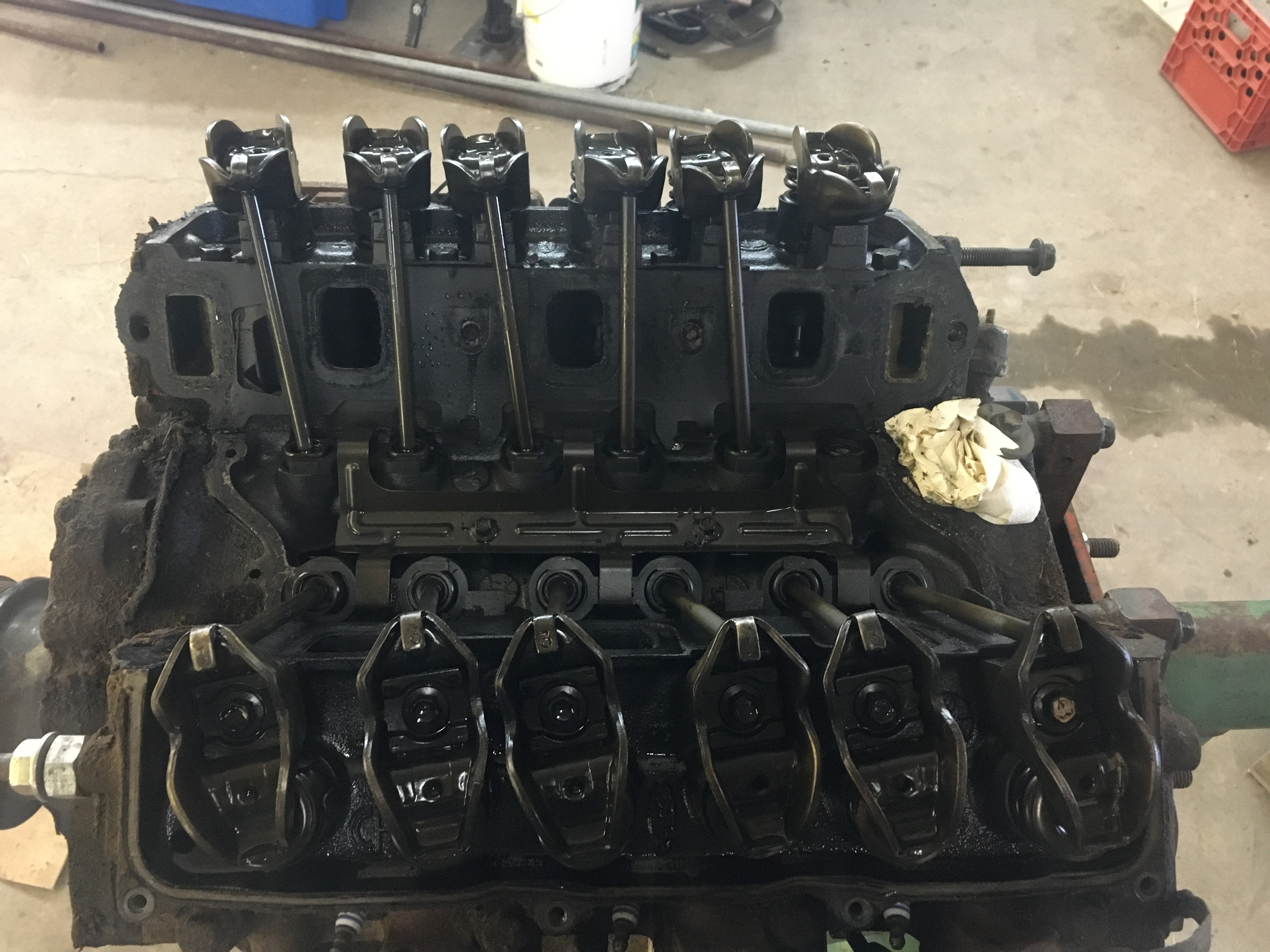
Lifter gallery and pushrods. Note the slightly canted valves.

== See also ==
- List of Ford engines
- List of Ford bellhousing patterns
