= Ford DN5 platform =

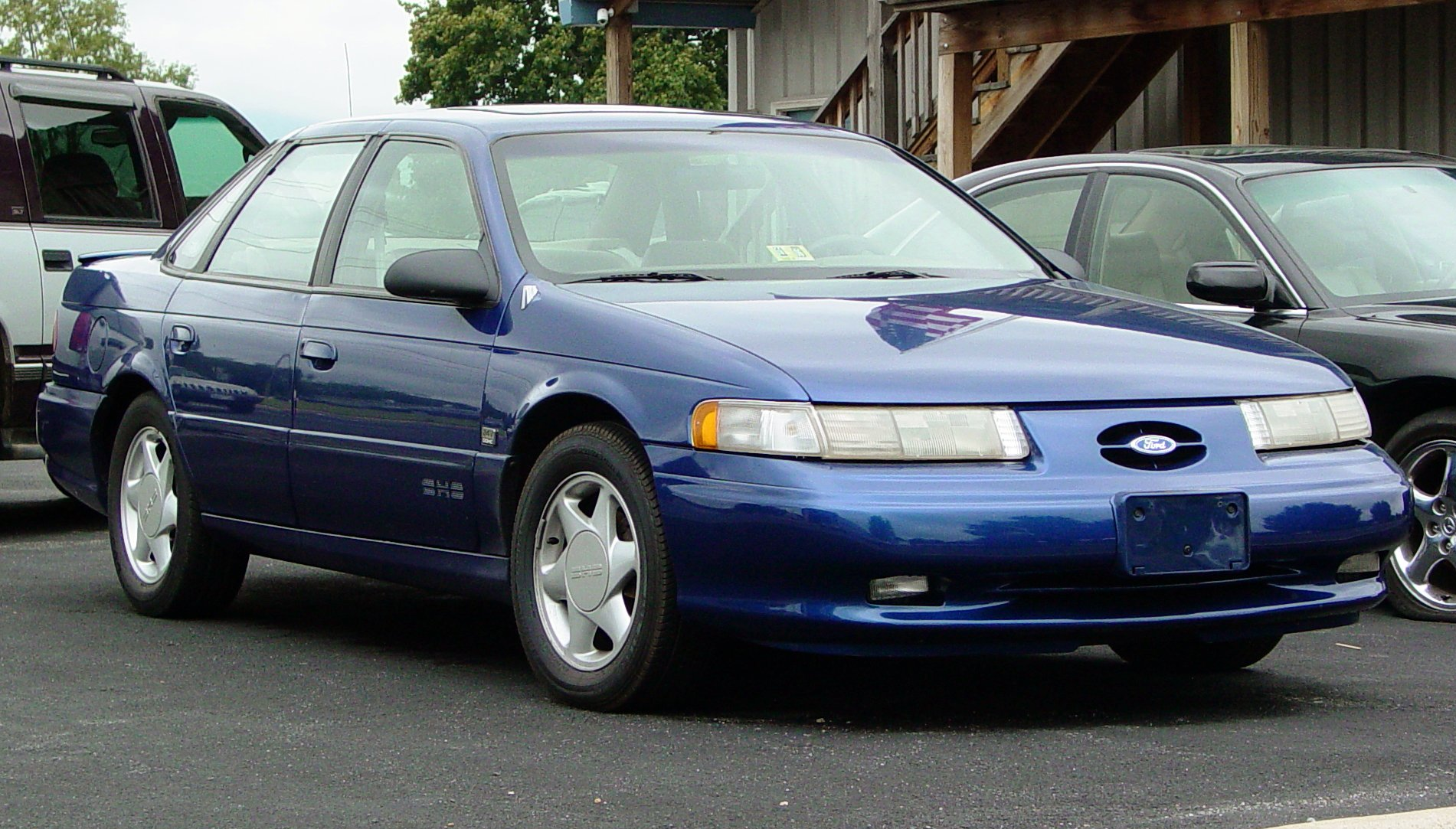

Overview
- Manufacturer: Ford Motor Company
- Also called: Ford FN9 platform Ford WIN88 platform
- Production: 1985–2002

Body and chassis
- Class: Mid-size
- Layout: FF transverse
- Body styles: 4-door sedan 5-door station wagon 4-door minivan
- Vehicles: Ford Taurus; Mercury Sable; Lincoln Continental; Ford Windstar

Chronology
- Predecessor: Ford Fox platform (Long wheelbase); Ford VN1 platform (Minivans)
- Successor: Ford DN101 Platform (Cars); Ford V platform (Minivans)

The Ford DN5 platform is an automobile platform that was produced by Ford Motor Company. Serving as the front-wheel drive replacement for the mid-size sedans of the Ford Fox platform, the DN5 chassis was produced in its initial form for the 1986 to the 1995 model years.

Developed as Ford transitioned its mid-size Ford and Mercury sedan ranges to front-wheel drive, the long-wheelbase FN9 variant of the platform was used by Lincoln; the 1988 Lincoln Continental was the first front-wheel drive vehicle ever sold by the division. As Ford developed its second generation of minivans, the WIN88 variant was used by the 1994 Ford Windstar.

In the late 1990s, the DN5 chassis was gradually replaced through model revisions and retirements.

== Models ==
- 1986–1995 Ford Taurus
- 1986–1995 Mercury Sable
- 1988–2002 Lincoln Continental
- 1995–1998 Ford Windstar

== Replacement ==
For 1996 production, the DN5 chassis underwent a substantial revision, receiving the DN101 chassis code for the third-generation Taurus and Sable. For 1999, the Ford Windstar retired the WIN88 chassis (derived from the DN5) in favor of the Ford V platform. Retaining an identical powertrain configuration (and wheelbase), the V platform was developed specifically as a minivan.

Following a substantial revision of the FN9 chassis for 1995 (to accommodate the 4.6L DOHC V8 for front-wheel drive), Lincoln produced the front-wheel drive Continental through the 2002 model year until the withdrawal of the model line.
