= List of Ford Taurus models =

This is a list of models of the Ford Taurus. The Taurus had been in production from the 1986 model year to the 2019 model year; its first run was as a mid-size sedan on the Ford DN5 platform, and its second and current production run has been as a full-size sedan on the Ford D3 platform.

== First generation ==
Image	Model years	Engines/Transmissions
Taurus MT5
	1986–1988	2.5 L HSC I4; 88 hp (66 kW), 130 lb⋅ft (176 N⋅m); 5-speed MTX manual
Taurus L
	1986–1991	2.5 L HSC I4 (sedans, 1986–1990); 88 hp (66 kW), 130 lb⋅ft (176 N⋅m); 3-speed ATX automatic; 3.0 L Vulcan V6 (Optional in sedans, standard in wagons, 1986–1990); 140 hp (104 kW), 160 lb⋅ft (217 N⋅m); 4-speed AXOD automatic; 2.5 L SFI HSC I4 (sedans, 1991); 105 hp (78 kW), 140 lb⋅ft (190 N⋅m); 3-speed ATX automatic; 3.0 L SFI Vulcan V6 (Optional in sedans, standard in wagons, 1991); 140 hp (104 kW), 160 lb⋅ft (217 N⋅m); 4-speed AXOD-E automatic
Taurus GL
	1986–1991	2.5 L HSC I4 (sedans, 1986–1990); 88 hp (66 kW), 130 lb⋅ft (176 N⋅m); 3-speed ATX automatic; 2.5 L SFI HSC I4 (sedans, 1991); 105 hp (78 kW), 140 lb⋅ft (190 N⋅m); 3-speed ATX automatic; 3.0 L Vulcan V6 (Optional in sedans, standard in wagons, 1986–1990); 140 hp (104 kW), 160 lb⋅ft (217 N⋅m); 4-speed AXOD automatic; 3.0 L SFI Vulcan V6 (Optional in sedans, standard in wagons, 1991); 140 hp (104 kW), 160 lb⋅ft (217 N⋅m); 4-speed AXOD-E automatic; 3.8 L SFI Essex V6 (Optional, 1988–1991); 140 hp (104 kW), 215 lb⋅ft (292 N⋅m); 4-speed AXOD automatic (1988–1990); 4-speed AXOD-E automatic (1991)
Taurus LX
	1986–1991	3.0 L Vulcan V6 (1986–1987; sedans, 1988–1990); 140 hp (104 kW), 160 lb⋅ft (217 N⋅m); 4-speed AXOD automatic; 3.8 L SFI Essex V6 (Optional in sedans, standard in wagons, 1988–1991); 140 hp (104 kW), 215 lb⋅ft (292 N⋅m); 4-speed AXOD automatic (1988–1990); 4-speed AXOD-E automatic (1991); 3.0 L SFI Vulcan V6 (sedans, 1991); 140 hp (104 kW), 160 lb⋅ft (217 N⋅m); 4-speed AXOD-E automatic
Taurus SHO
	1989–1991	3.0 L SHO V6; 220 hp (164 kW), 200 lb⋅ft (271 N⋅m); 5-speed MTX-IV manual

== Second generation ==
Image	Years	Engines/Transmissions
Taurus L
	1992	3.0 L SFI Vulcan V6; 140 hp (104 kW), 160 lb⋅ft (217 N⋅m); 4-speed AXOD-E automatic
Taurus GL
	1992–1995	3.0 L SFI Vulcan V6; 140 hp (104 kW), 160 lb⋅ft (217 N⋅m) (1992); 140 hp (104 kW), 165 lb⋅ft (224 N⋅m) (1993–1995); 4-speed AXOD-E automatic (1992); 4-speed AX4S automatic (1993–1995); 4-speed AX4N automatic (1994–1995); 3.8 L Essex V6 (Optional); 140 hp (104 kW), 215 lb⋅ft (292 N⋅m); 4-speed AXOD-E automatic (1992); 4-speed AX4S automatic (1993–1995)
Taurus LX
	1992–1995	3.0 L SFI Vulcan V6 (Not available on Wagon); 140 hp (104 kW), 160 lb⋅ft (217 N⋅m) (1992); 140 hp (104 kW), 165 lb⋅ft (224 N⋅m) (1993–1995); 4-speed AXOD-E automatic (1992); 4-speed AX4S automatic (1993–1995); 3.8 L Essex V6 (Optional on sedan, standard on Wagon); 140 hp (104 kW), 215 lb⋅ft (292 N⋅m); 4-speed AXOD-E automatic (1992); 4-speed AX4S automatic (1993–1995)
Taurus SE
	1995	3.0 L SFI Vulcan V6; 140 hp (104 kW), 165 lb⋅ft (224 N⋅m); 4-speed AX4S automatic; 3.8 L Essex V6 (optional); 140 hp (104 kW), 215 lb⋅ft (292 N⋅m); 4-speed AX4S automatic
Taurus SHO
	1992–1995	3.0 L SHO V6 (Only available with manual, 1992–1995); 220 hp (164 kW), 200 lb⋅ft (271 N⋅m); 5-speed MTX-IV manual (1992–1995); 3.2 L SHO V6 (Only available with automatic, 1993–1995); 220 hp (164 kW), 215 lb⋅ft (292 N⋅m); 4-speed AX4S automatic (1993–1995)

== Third generation ==
=== 1996–1997 ===
Image	Years	Engines/Transmissions
Taurus G
	1996–1997	3.0 L SFI Vulcan V6; 145 hp (108 kW), 170 lb⋅ft (230 N⋅m); 4-speed AX4S automatic
Taurus GL
	1996–1997	3.0 L SFI Vulcan V6; 145 hp (108 kW), 170 lb⋅ft (230 N⋅m); 4-speed AX4S automatic; 4 speed AX4N automatic
Taurus LX
	1996–1997	3.0 L DOHC Duratec 30 V6; 200 hp (149 kW), 200 lb⋅ft (271 N⋅m); 4-speed AX4N automatic
Taurus SHO
	1996–1997	3.4 L SHO V8; 235 hp (175 kW), 230 lb⋅ft (312 N⋅m); 4-speed AX4N automatic

=== 1998–1999 ===
Image	Years	Engines/Transmissions
Taurus LX
	1998–1999	3.0 L SFI Vulcan V6; 145 hp (108 kW), 170 lb⋅ft (230 N⋅m); 4-speed AX4S automatic
Taurus SE
	1998–1999	3.0 L SFI Vulcan V6; 145 hp (108 kW), 170 lb⋅ft (230 N⋅m); 4-speed AX4S automatic; 3.0 L DOHC Duratec 30 V6 (optional); 200 hp (149 kW), 200 lb⋅ft (271 N⋅m); 4-speed AX4N automatic
Taurus SHO
	1998–1999	3.4 L SHO V8; 235 hp (175 kW), 230 lb⋅ft (312 N⋅m); 4-speed AX4N automatic

== Fourth generation ==
Image	Years	Engines/Transmissions
Taurus LX
	2000–2004	3.0 L SFI Vulcan V6; 155 hp (116 kW), 185 lb⋅ft (251 N⋅m); 4-speed AX4N automatic
Taurus SE
	2000–2007	3.0 L SFI Vulcan V6; 155 hp (116 kW), 185 lb⋅ft (251 N⋅m); 4-speed AX4N automatic
Taurus SE Special Value Group (2000) Taurus SES (2001–2004)
	2000–2004	3.0 L SFI Vulcan V6; 155 hp (116 kW), 185 lb⋅ft (251 N⋅m); 4-speed AX4N automatic; 3.0 L DOHC Duratec 30 V6 (Optional); 200 hp (149 kW), 200 lb⋅ft (271 N⋅m); 4-speed AX4N automatic
Taurus SE Comfort (2000) Taurus SEL (2001–2007)
	2000–2007	3.0 L SFI Vulcan V6 (2006–2007); 155 hp (116 kW), 185 lb⋅ft (251 N⋅m); 4-speed AX4N automatic; 3.0 L DOHC Duratec 30 V6 (2000–2005); 200 hp (149 kW), 200 lb⋅ft (271 N⋅m); 4-speed AX4N automatic

== Fifth generation ==
Image	Years	Engines/Transmissions
Taurus SEL
2008 Ford Taurus SEL	2008–2009	3.5 L Cyclone V6; 263 hp (196 kW), 249 lb⋅ft (338 N⋅m); 6-speed 6F automatic
Taurus Limited
Ford Taurus Limited	2008–2009	3.5 L Cyclone V6; 263 hp (196 kW), 249 lb⋅ft (338 N⋅m); 6-speed 6F automatic

== Sixth generation ==
Image	Years	Engines/Transmissions
Taurus SE, SEL, Limited
	2010–2019	2.0 L Inline four-cylinder I4; 240 hp (179 kW), 270 lb⋅ft (366 N⋅m) (2013–2017); 3.5 L Cyclone V6; 263 hp (196 kW), 249 lb⋅ft (338 N⋅m) (2010–2012); 288 hp (215 kW), 254 lb⋅ft (344 N⋅m) (2013–2019); 6-speed 6F automatic
Taurus SHO
	2010–2019	3.5 L EcoBoost V6; 365 hp (272 kW), 350 lb⋅ft (475 N⋅m); 6-speed 6F automatic
