= Ford SHO V6 engine =

Ford SHO V6
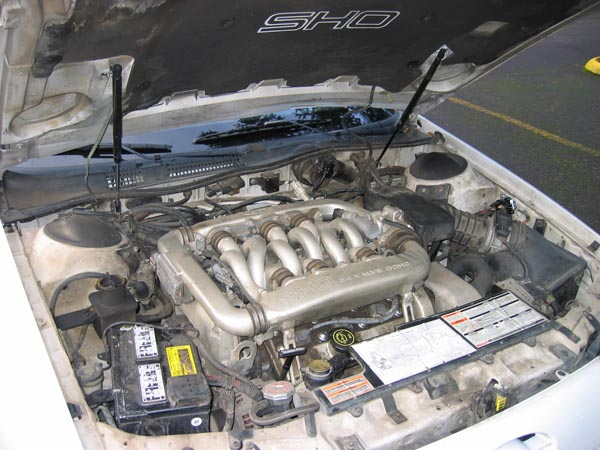

Overview
- Manufacturer: Yamaha Motor Corporation
- Production: 1989–1995

Layout
- Configuration: Naturally aspirated 60° V6
- Displacement: 3.0 L; 182.2 cu in (2,986 cc); 3.2 L; 194.7 cu in (3,191 cc)
- Cylinder bore: 89 mm (3.5 in); 92 mm (3.62 in)
- Piston stroke: 80 mm (3.15 in)
- Cylinder block material: Iron
- Cylinder head material: Aluminum
- Valvetrain: DOHC 24-valve

RPM range
- Max. engine speed: 7000

Combustion
- Fuel system: Fuel injection
- Fuel type: Gasoline
- Cooling system: Water-cooled

Output
- Power output: 220 hp (164 kW) at 6200 rpm (3.0 L); 220 hp (164 kW) at 6000 rpm (3.2 L)
- Torque output: 200 lb⋅ft (271 N⋅m) at 4800 rpm (3.0 L); 215 lb⋅ft (292 N⋅m) at 4000 rpm (3.2 L)

Chronology
- Successor: Ford SHO V8

The Ford SHO V6 is a family of DOHC V6 engines fitted to the Ford Taurus SHO from 1989 to 1995. The designation SHO denotes Super High Output.

Due to the engine's unusual and aesthetically pleasing appearance it is sometimes transplanted into other vehicles. Its distinctive variable length intake manifold is bilaterally symmetrical, so it can be rotated 180 degrees (making it face "backwards" on the engine, relative to its original installation orientation) to ease the engine's transition from transverse to longitudinal mounting.

The SHO engines share a common bell housing pattern with the following Ford engines: the 2.3/2.5 L FWD HSC I4, the 3.0 L FWD/RWD Vulcan V6, and the 3.8 L FWD Canadian Essex V6. In 1996, Ford discontinued the SHO V6 and began fitting the Taurus SHOs with the SHO 3.4 L V8 and the Ford AX4N automatic transmission.

== Origin ==
In 1984, executives of the Yamaha Motor Corporation signed a contract with the Ford Motor Company to develop, produce, and supply a compact 60° DOHC V6 engine based upon the existing Vulcan engine for transverse application.

== 3.0 L ==
The SHO V6 was a high-tech and revolutionary design when it debuted in 1988. Displacing 3.0 L; 182.2 cu in (2,986 cc), it was an iron block, closed deck, aluminum head 24-valve DOHC engine with an innovative variable length intake manifold. Its oversquare and symmetrical design, which sported an 89 mm × 80 mm (3.50 in × 3.15 in) bore and stroke, gave the high-revving engine an output of 220 bhp (164 kW; 223 PS) at 6200 rpm and 200 lb⋅ft (271 N⋅m) of torque at 4800 rpm at the flywheel, and it sported the added luxury of being able to be used in rear-drive applications. Redline was marked on the tachometer at 7000 rpm, and fuel cut-off occurred at 7300 rpm. This engine was only available with the Ford MTX-IV transmission.

== 3.2 L ==
From 1993 to 1995, the SHO engine was sold in two displacements: the existing 3.0 L (2,986 cc) continued to be sold mated to the MTX-IV manual transmission, and a new 3.2 L; 194.7 cu in (3,191 cc) engine was sold mated to the Ford AX4S automatic transmission. The new 3.2 L (3,191 cc) engine, while retaining the same 80 mm (3.15 in) stroke of its 3.0 L (2,986 cc) brother, sported a larger 92 mm (3.62 in) bore that helped raise torque output to 215 lb⋅ft (292 N⋅m) at 4000 rpm at the flywheel. Power output was still 220 bhp (164 kW; 223 PS), but now at 6000 rpm; this was due to a milder cam setup compared to the more aggressive intake camshaft in the 3.0 L (2,986 cc) version.

== Other Ford vehicles ==
In 1989, with the help of Roush Racing, Ford Truck Public Affairs created a one-off Ford Ranger, dubbed the "SHO Ranger", with a 3.0 L (2,986 cc) SHO V6 and a Mustang GT's T-5 manual transmission. According to D.A. "Woody" Haines, assistant manager of that division, they commissioned the project truck "to test the market."

In 1993, Ford Canada hand-built 40 Mercury Sables, some of which were powered by SHO V6 engines, as part of their AIV (Aluminum Intensive Vehicle) program and released 20 to the public. Using aluminum suspension elements and aluminum body panels, held together with spot welding and adhesive joining processes developed specifically for this vehicle, the end result was a car that was 400 lb (180 kg) lighter than a SHO Taurus. Multimatic Motorsports entered one of these vehicles in the 1995 One Lap of America event, finishing 15th overall and 1st in the Mid-Price class.

== Modifications ==
A popular modification to cars equipped with the 3.0 L (2,986 cc) SHO engine is to replace the engine with a 3.2 L (3,191 cc) engine. Further modification can include installing the cams from a 3.0 L (2,986 cc) engine into a 3.2 L (3,191 cc) engine. These more aggressive cams, along with a higher torque output have been known to allow the manual transmission-equipped Taurus SHO to run into the low 14s on the 1/4 mi (402 m).

== SHOGun Festiva ==
In 1990, Chuck Beck of Special Editions and Rick Titus took seven Ford Festivas and mounted 3.0 L (2,986 cc) SHO V6s − still mated to their native transmissions − behind the front seats in mid-rear engine configuration. Along with substantial cosmetic body changes, including custom fiberglass wheel arches to accommodate a wider stance and larger tires, the suspension was completely redesigned. Each car was painted a different color. These changes resulted in a car that could do a quarter-mile (400 m) run in 12.9 seconds at 100.9 mph (162.4 km/h), and could achieve a lateral acceleration figure ranging from .95 to 1.04 g. Two of the seven are notable; Jay Leno owns number 003 (the silver one), and number 005 (the purple one) included special modifications for competition in the SCCA, including a rollcage and 5-point restraints. One was destroyed in the 2021–2022 Boulder County fires.

Since the creation of these cars, others have imitated the idea by performing SHO-to-Festiva transplants of their own.

== See also ==
- Ford Taurus SHO
- Ford SHO V8 engine
- List of Ford engines
- List of Ford transmissions
- List of Ford bellhousing patterns
