= List of Ford bellhousing patterns =

The following is a list of Ford bellhousing patterns. A list of bell housing patterns for General Motors transmissions is also available, as is a list of engines for Ford Motor Company.

== Ford Flathead engine pattern ==
- 221 V8
- 239 V8 (pre-1949 autos, pre-1948 trucks, post 1947 trucks with factory adapter housing)
- 239 V8 (post-1948 autos, post 1947 trucks)
- 255 V8

== Lincoln Y-block pattern ==
- 317 V8
- 341 V8
- 368 V8

== Ford Y-block pattern ==
- 239 V8
- 256 V8
- 272 V8
- 292 V8
- 312 V8

== Early MEL pattern (1958–1960, Same as FE) ==
- 383 V8
- 410 V8
- 430 V8

== Late MEL pattern (1961–1968) ==
- 430 V8
- 462 V8

== FE Gen 1 and Gen 2 pattern ==
- 330 FT V8
- 332 V8
- 352 V8
- 360 V8
- 361 FT V8
- 390 V8
- 391 FT V8
- 406 V8
- 410 Mercury V8
- 427 V8
- 428 V8

== Early Small block V8 pattern ==
- 221 V8
- 260 V8
- 289 V8 (made before August 3, 1964) - had five bolts holding bellhousing to block

== Later Small Block V8 pattern ==
Note: this is commonly called the Ford Small-block V8 pattern, though it is used in some "big block"-sized V8's as well as some V6's and I6's.

- 200 I6 1978-1983 only, partial (4 of 6 bolts) pattern.
- 250 I6 (except Australian 250/4.1)
- 255 V8
- 289 V8 - (made after August 3, 1964) - had 6 bolts holding bellhousing to block
- 302 Cleveland (Australia)
- 351 Cleveland V8 (not the 351 Cleveland M-block engine)
- 351 Boss
- 351 Cobra Jet
- 302 Windsor V8
- 351 Windsor V8
- 400 Cleveland Ford 335 engine#400 V8 aka 400FMX certain 1973 casting numbers D1AE and D3AE, mated to the FMX transmission)
- 3.8/3.9/4.2L Canadian Essex 90° V6 (RWD only)
- 240 I6
- 300 4.9 I6
- 4.6L Modular V8 (first two casting runs, numbers F1AE and F2VE)
- 302 5.0L Windsor V8
- 351 5.8L Windsor V8

== 335/385 Big Block V8 pattern ==
335-Series (M-Block)

- 351 M-block V8 (Not to be confused with the 351 Cleveland which uses the small block V8 pattern)
- 400 V8 (except some 1971 and 1973 late Windsor-style castings)

385-Series

- 370 V8
- 429 V8
- 460 V8
- 514 V8

== Taunus/Cologne pattern ==
Named for the 1962 Ford Taunus V4 engine and Ford Cologne V6 engine built in Cologne, Germany.

- 1.2/1.3/1.5/1.7L were mostly in European Cars.
- 1.8, 2.0/2.3 had the same bellhousings bolt patterns with differences from year to year to be wary of. The Mazda transmission 5M** does not "directly replace" the Mitsubishi transmissions as there are shifter spacing differences in the floorboard. The Mitsubishi transmission was made to fit Mustang IIs and was shoehorned into the early Rangers. Later models came with hydraulic clutches. These were commonly found in Pintos, some Mustang II/Capris, and Rangers but do not match the V6 Bell housings. Changing the engine to a V6 often requires changing the bellhousing (Mitsubishi) but the Mazda trans had an integral bell.
- 2.6, 2.8, 2.9, and 2.9 Cosworth. Most of these were RWD car engines. Some had the same Mitsubishi manual transmission as the 2.0/2.3 but had different bellhousings. The 2.3, 2.8, and 2.9 also made it into the Ranger, and Bronco II.
- 4.0L was produced by Ford Cologne Germany (like the unrelated and the all-new metric Taurus/Sable FWD 3.0 V6). Both were put in the North American Ranger, Aerostar, Explorer platforms. The 4.0L bellhousing and the 3.0L bellhousings "MAY" interchange, but they do not interchange with the previous Cologne engines.

== Falcon Six pattern ==
- 144 I6
- 170 I6
- 200 I6 (through 1977; 1978-1983 have partial late Windsor pattern)
- 188, 221, all 250, 3.3 & 4.1 I6 (Australian produced)

== Early OHV Six pattern ==
- 215 I6
- 223 I6 v2
- 262 I6

== UK Essex pattern ==
- 1.7 L / 2.0 L Essex V4
- 2.5 / 3.0 / 3.1 L UK Essex V6

== Pinto/Kent/Lima Pattern (also see Taunus/Cologne Pattern) ==
(Lima pattern has the two top bolt holes moved up about an inch)

- 1.0/1.3/1.5/1.6 Kent (Pre-Crossflow and Crossflow)
- 1.6L/2.0L EAO
- 1.3/1.6/1.8/2.0/2.3/2.5L OHC I4 RWD. This engine was also produced in Cologne, Germany. It was put in Pintos, Mustangs, Fairmonts and Rangers. It was then modified by Mazda to become the 2.5L in the late 1990s Ranger/U.S. sold Mazda pickups. Ford modified this design further so it is hardly recognizable from pre-2000 (date uncertain) year models. Caution!
- 1.8/2.0 Zetec-E/Zeta Engine Zeta (Later blocks had the starter relocated to one of the bellhousing bolt locations and only partially match.)
- 1.1/1.3/1.4/1.6/1.6 Turbo/1.8/1.9/2.0 CVH/SPI
- 1.6 Lotus Twin Cam
- 1.6/1.7 Cosworth BDA
- 2.0/2.3/2.5 Lima (At least early blocks had both the Pinto/Kent pattern and the modified Lima pattern)
- 2.3/2.5L HSC FWD I4 (Ford Tempo/Mercury Topaz pushrod 2.3L)

== Duratec I4 pattern ==
- 1.8/2.0/2.3/2.3 DISI Turbo/2.5 Duratec (Mazda L engine)
- 2.0/2.3 EcoBoost

== Sigma I4 pattern ==
- 1.25/1.4/1.5/1.6/1.7 Sigma
- 1.5/1.6 EcoBoost

== Vulcan V6 pattern ==
- 3.0L Vulcan V6 (FWD Taurus/Sable and RWD Ranger, but no relation to the 2.9L)
- 3.0/3.2L SHO Yamaha designed V6
- 3.8L Canadian Essex 90° V6 (FWD only) (not the same as the 60° British Essex V6).

== Duratec V6 pattern ==
- 2.5L/3.0L Duratec V6
- 3.4L DOHC SHO V8

== Modular V8 pattern ==
- 4.6L SOHC/DOHC V8 (later castings, F3VE and up)
- 5.0L Coyote DOHC V8
- 5.4L SOHC/DOHC V8
- 6.0L Powerstroke
- 6.2L Boss
- 6.8L Triton SOHC V10
- 7.3L Ford Godzilla

== Lincoln Continental Modular V8 pattern ==
- 4.6L DOHC V8 FWD

== IDI/DI ==
- 6.9L International Harvester IDI diesel V8
- 7.3L Navistar IDI and IDI turbodiesel V8
- 7.3L Navistar Power Stroke turbodiesel V8 1994–2003

All 7.3L Power Stroke engines had a removable adapter on the rear of the block with either the IDI pattern or SAE 2 pattern.
