= Mercury Sable =

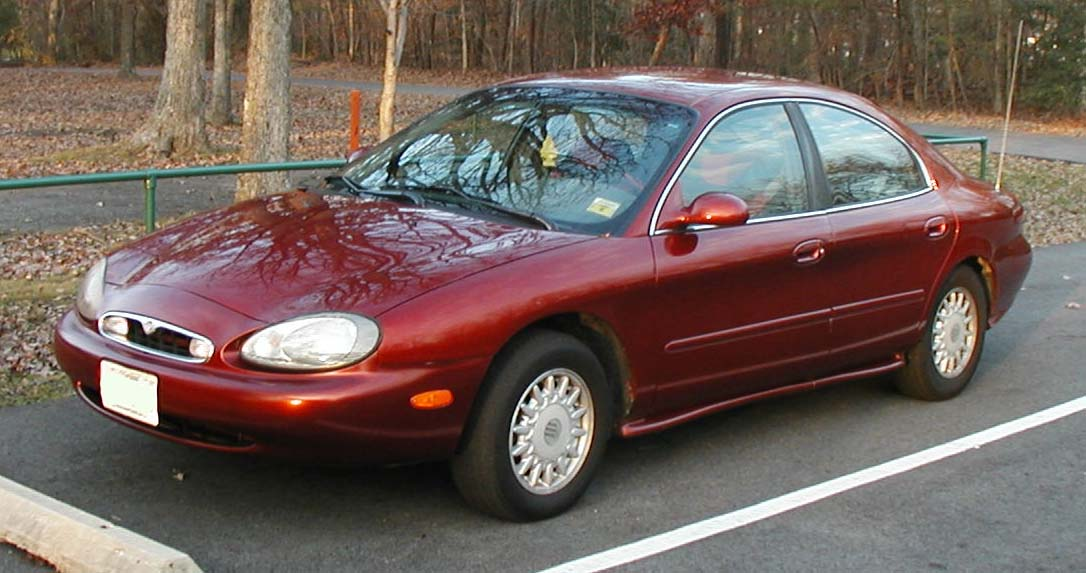

Overview
- Manufacturer: Mercury (Ford)
- Production: October 1985 – April 29, 2005; June 2007 – May 21, 2009
- Model years: 1986–2005; 2008–2009

Body and chassis
- Class: Mid-size car (MY 1986–2005); Full-size car (MY 2008–2009)

Chronology
- Predecessor: Mid-size: Mercury Marquis; Full-size: Mercury Montego
- Successor: Ford Taurus Limited (indirect)

The Mercury Sable is a range of automobiles that was sold by Mercury from the 1986 to 2009 model years. The namesake of a East Russian weasel valued for its fur, the Sable served as the divisional counterpart of the Ford Taurus for its entire production. Slotted below the Grand Marquis in size, the model line was the largest front-wheel drive vehicle sold by the brand.

For its first four generations, the Sable was a mid-size car, offered as both a four-door sedan and five-door station wagon. After the 2005 model year, the model line was discontinued as Mercury replaced the Sable with the full-size Montego and mid-size Milan sedans. For 2008, a fifth generation of the Sable was introduced, as the nameplate was revived to replace the Montego (as Ford also reintroduced the Taurus). Coinciding with poor sales and the ultimate retirement of the Mercury brand, the Sable was discontinued after the 2009 model year.

Through its entire production as a mid-size car, Ford assembled the Sable alongside the Taurus at its Atlanta Assembly (Hapeville, Georgia) and Chicago Assembly (Chicago, Illinois) facilities; the latter facility produced the model line as a full-size car. On May 21, 2009, the final Sable was produced; in total, over 2.1 million Mercury Sables were built, making it the third-most produced Mercury model line (behind the Grand Marquis and Cougar).

== Background ==
In early 1980, the Mercury Sable began development alongside the Ford Taurus. The largest project ever undertaken by Ford at the time, the new model line was intended to replace both of the rear-wheel drive Panther and Fox platforms with a single front-wheel drive chassis architecture. During 1981, the objective was revised as the stabilization of gasoline prices justified the further use of the Panther chassis. In response, Ford continued on with the project serving as the successor to the midsize Fox architecture, marketed in a segment rapidly transitioning to front-wheel drive.

While designed entirely in North America, the Taurus/Sable was designed under a similar approach as the Ford Escort, using an interdisciplinary team approach to design each element of the vehicle concurrently (including manufacturing and assembly). Along with researching input from potential buyers (in notable contrast to the Edsel), Ford designers researched design to reduce repair costs and difficulty, using reverse engineering of competitive vehicles to improve both design and production.

After the 1981 introduction of the Dodge Aries/Plymouth Reliant, General Motors redesigned its A-body line for 1982, releasing the quartet of the Buick Century/Chevrolet Celebrity/Oldsmobile Cutlass Ciera/Pontiac 6000, both downsizing it and transitioning it to front-wheel drive. For 1983, Chrysler introduced the Dodge 600 and Chrysler New Yorker, extending the K-car footprint into the midsize class.

For 1983, Ford underwent a major revision of its midsize and fullsize product ranges. For Mercury, the Cougar reverted to its traditional role as a two-door personal coupe (as a divisional counterpart of the Ford Thunderbird). As part of an extensive model change, the exterior of the Cougar/Thunderbird (while retaining the Fox chassis) was completely redesigned; the two model lines were the inaugural models of aerodynamically-enhanced body styling, which was a central objective of the Taurus/Sable design. The redesign was well-received in the marketplace, with the 1983 Cougar outselling the Thunderbird. Coinciding with the redesign of the Cougar XR7, the Cougar sedan/wagon (the Mercury counterpart of the Ford Granada) underwent a slight restyling, taking on the Mercury Marquis name (in a split from the larger Grand Marquis; Ford replaced the Granada with the LTD).

Along with reinforcing sales of two struggling model lines, the move of the LTD/Marquis nameplates to the Fox platform effectively downsized the model line a second time for minimal cost. It also set the final trajectory for the project, with the Ford Taurus replacing the Ford LTD and the Mercury Sable replacing the Mercury Marquis. After 1983, the inaugural Ford Fairmont/Mercury Zephyr were discontinued as Ford replaced them with the 1984 Ford Tempo and Mercury Topaz, which expanded the use of aerodynamic body styling to sedans.

Coinciding with the launch of the Taurus/Sable, GM downsized its full-size Buick, Oldsmobile, and Pontiac full-size lines, moving its C-body cars to front-wheel drive, and replacing nearly all its B-body cars with the H-body chassis. Sized only slightly larger than the Sable, the aerodynamic design of the model lines adopted far more conservative styling than the Mercury.

=== Release ===
In mid-1985, Ford unveiled the Mercury Sable alongside the Ford Taurus as a 1986 model. In place of a traditional auto show unveiling, Ford held a singular event for the model launch, located on an MGM Studios soundstage (where Gone with the Wind was filmed). Ford workers came into the room, which was decorated in space-age decor, holding cups shaped like flying saucers and the Taurus and Sable were sitting behind a curtain. With the flashing of strobe lights and a drum-roll, the curtain was pulled back and the two cars were revealed to the public.

Ford planned a sensual marketing campaign for the Sable featuring singer and entertainer Bette Midler. However, Midler turned down Ford's offer and refused to appear in the ads, so Ford utilized an impersonator of Midler as a substitute. Midler sued in response, leading to the memorable case Midler v. Ford Motor Co. which clarified whether impersonations could be considered an appropriation of identity.

== First generation (1986–1991) ==
First generation
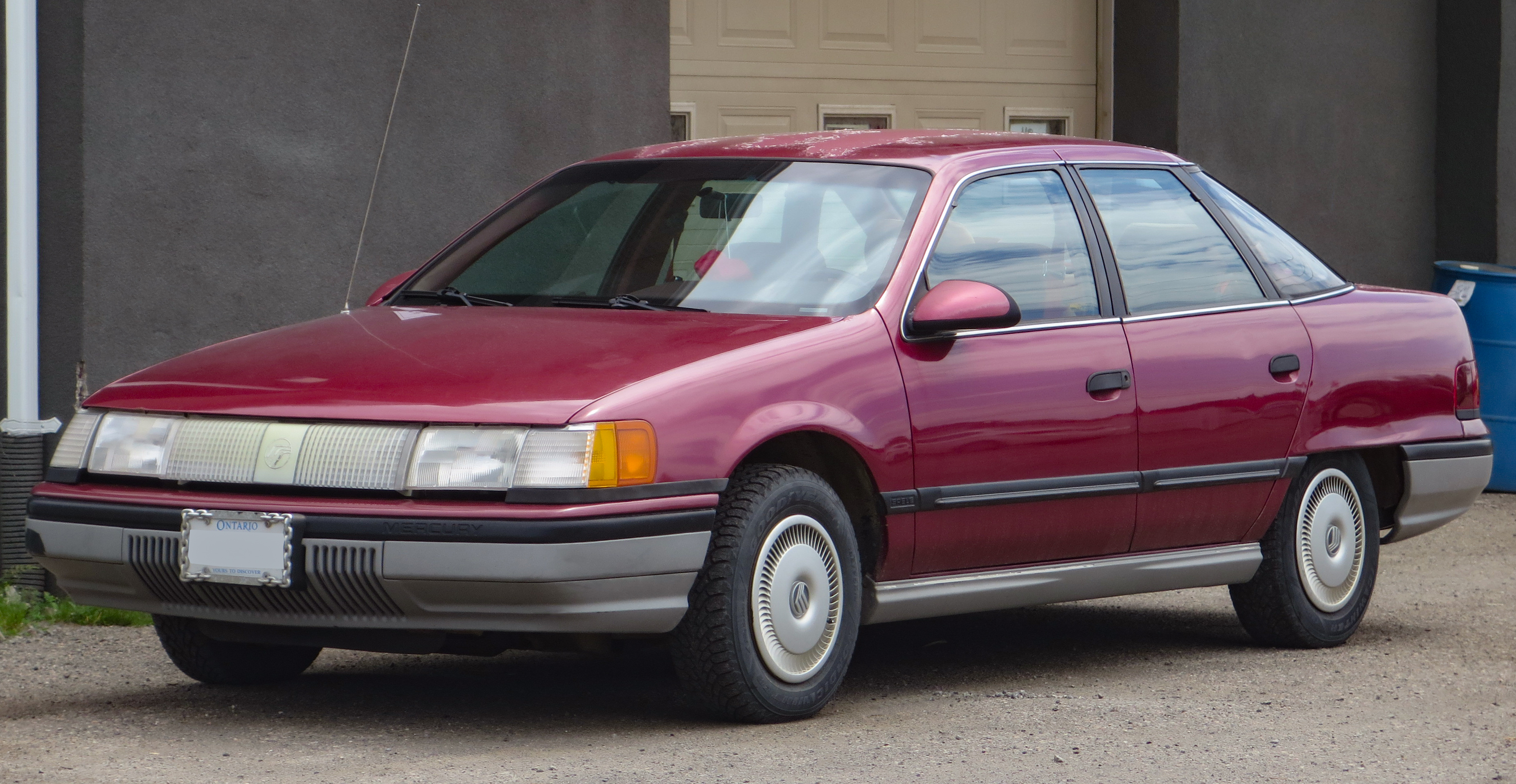
- 1988 Mercury Sable GS

Overview
- Also called: Ford Taurus (Mexico); Kia Sable (South Korea)
- Production: October 1985 – 1991
- Assembly: United States: Atlanta, Georgia (Atlanta Assembly); Chicago, Illinois (Chicago Assembly)
- Designer: Jack Telnack

Body and chassis
- Body style: 4-door sedan 5-door station wagon
- Layout: FF layout
- Platform: Ford DN5 Platform
- Related: Ford Taurus; Lincoln Continental

Powertrain
- Engine: 2.5 L HSC I4; 3.0 L Vulcan V6; 3.8 L Essex V6
- Transmission: 3-speed ATX automatic 4-speed AXOD automatic

Dimensions
- Wheelbase: 106 in (2,692 mm)
- Length: 190.9 in (4,849 mm) (1986–1988 sedan); 192.2 in (4,882 mm) (1989–1991 sedan); 191.9 in (4,874 mm) (1986–1988 station wagon); 193.2 in (4,907 mm) (1989–1991 station wagon)
- Width: 70.8 in (1,798 mm)
- Height: 54.3 in (1,379 mm) (sedan); 55.1 in (1,400 mm) (station wagon)

Launched in December 1985 as a 1986 model, the Mercury Sable replaced the Mercury Marquis as the mid-size Mercury line, slotted between the Topaz and Grand Marquis/Colony Park. For 1986, the Sable was marketed alongside its Marquis predecessor. Along with both model lines being under production concurrently (briefly), Ford had sought to protect its investment in its multibillion-dollar project. As Ford did not market the Mercury brand in Mexico, Ford of Mexico sold the Sable badged as a Ford Taurus. In South Korea, Kia sold the Sable under its own brand alongside the Kia Potentia (Mazda Luce/929).

Though the Sable was outsold by the Taurus by a wide margin, it would prove successful on its own. For its first generation, the Sable competed with the Grand Marquis to serve as the highest-selling Mercury model line (with a different Mercury not doing so until 2008).

The Sable was on Car and Driver magazine's Ten Best list on its release in 1986 and again in 1990 and 1991.

=== Chassis specification ===
The first-generation Sable used the front-wheel drive Ford DN5 platform, sharing its 106 in (2,692 mm) wheelbase with the Ford Taurus. As with its Marquis predecessor, the Sable used unibody construction. The Sable was equipped with a four-wheel independent suspension. The front axle was fitted with MacPherson struts and a stabilizer bar; the rear axle on sedans was a coil-spring 4-link layout (also with MacPherson struts), while the rear suspension on station wagons was a coil-spring double-wishbone design (short/long arm), along with a stabilizer bar. As with the Marquis, the Sable was equipped with front disc brakes and rear drum brakes; station wagons were fitted with larger rear brakes.

==== Powertrain ====
For 1986, the Sable was offered was with two engines: a 90 hp HSC I4 (mated to a three-speed automatic) and a 140 hp Vulcan V6 (paired to a four-speed automatic). Following poor sales of the four-cylinder engine in the Sable, the engine was dropped from the line (along with the 3-speed automatic) for 1987; the powertrain combination would remain standard for the Taurus through 1991. For 1988, a 3.8 L Essex V6 was introduced as an optional engine. Though rated with the same 140 hp output as the 3.0 L Vulcan V6, the 3.8 L V6 was rated with nearly 35% more torque output (popular in the heavier station wagons).

In contrast to the Taurus, the first-generation Sable (nor any of its successors) was not offered with a manual transmission.

| Model | Engine | Year | Power | Torque | Transmission |
|---|---|---|---|---|---|
| GS | 2.5 L CFI HSC I4 | 1986 | 90 hp (67 kW) | 130 lb⋅ft (176 N⋅m) | 3-speed ATX automatic |
| GS | 3.0 L SFI Vulcan V6 | 1986–1991 | 140 hp (104 kW) | 160 lb⋅ft (217 N⋅m) | 4-speed AXOD automatic (1986–1990); 4-speed AXOD-E automatic (1991) |
| LS | 3.0 L SFI Vulcan V6 | 1986–1991 | 140 hp (104 kW) | 160 lb⋅ft (217 N⋅m) | 4-speed AXOD automatic (1986–1990); 4-speed AXOD-E automatic (1991) |
| GS | 3.8 L SFI Essex V6 | 1988–1991 | 140 hp (104 kW) | 215 lb⋅ft (292 N⋅m) | 4-speed AXOD automatic (1986–1990); 4-speed AXOD-E automatic (1991) |
| LS | 3.8 L SFI Essex V6 | 1988–1991 | 140 hp (104 kW) | 215 lb⋅ft (292 N⋅m) | 4-speed AXOD automatic (1986–1990); 4-speed AXOD-E automatic (1991) |

=== Body design ===
The first-generation Sable was offered in two body styles: a four-door sedan and a five-door station wagon. While its 1983–1986 Marquis predecessor shared nearly its entire body with its Ford LTD counterpart, the Sable sedan shared only its doors and roof stamping with the Taurus. In what would become a tradition for four model generations, the station wagon body for both model lines was derived from the Sable; the Taurus wagon was styled with its own front fascia.

The Sable was also styled with a 6-window roofline, but borrowed design elements from the European Ford Scorpio liftback sedan, using blacked-out B, C, and D-pillars for a "floating roof" effect. Though two inches longer than the Taurus, the rear wheel openings were cut off at bumper height (though not skirted) to visually add additional length. In what would be associated with the styling identity of Mercury for nearly a decade, the Sable introduced a low-wattage lightbar between its headlamps, later adopted by the Mercury Topaz, Tracer, and Villager (skipping the Cougar and Grand Marquis). The lightbar feature largely emphasized the lack of a conventional grille (while primarily a "bottom-breather" design, the Sable used vestigial air intake slots in the bumper below the lightbar). The Sable and the Taurus followed the configuration pioneered by the 1950s Citroën DS; the Ford Mustang SVO and Ford Sierra also lacked a conventional grille.

As with its Marquis predecessor, the Sable station wagon was designed with a rear liftback, but introduced a new configuration for the rear hatch, allowing the rear window glass to be opened separately from the rest of the rear hatch.

Alongside the Taurus, the Sable was the first American-produced sedan to use aerodynamic composite headlights with replaceable halogen bulbs; to begin their use, Ford (and other auto manufacturers) lobbied the National Highway Traffic Safety Administration (NHTSA) to have them approved, with the 1984 Continental Mark VII becoming the first American car to use them.

While the Sable shared largely the same interior features as the Taurus, in a departure from tradition, the Sable was designed with a model-specific dashboard (partly integrated into the door panels). Sable sedans were equipped with a 50/50 split bench seat as standard equipment (joining the Grand Marquis as a six-passenger Mercury sedan); as an option, front bucket seats were offered (reducing capacity to five). The Sable wagon was offered with an optional rear-facing third-row seat, bringing seating to seven or eight; for the first time since the 1977 Cougar wagon, Mercury offered the design in its midsize station wagon.

During its production, the first-generation Sable underwent few changes. For 1989, the exterior underwent a mid-cycle revision; the amber parking lamp lenses were replaced by clear units and sedans saw revisions to taillamp lenses. For 1990, the Sable underwent a redesign of the dashboard to accommodate the addition of a driver-side airbag; a CD player was added as an option.

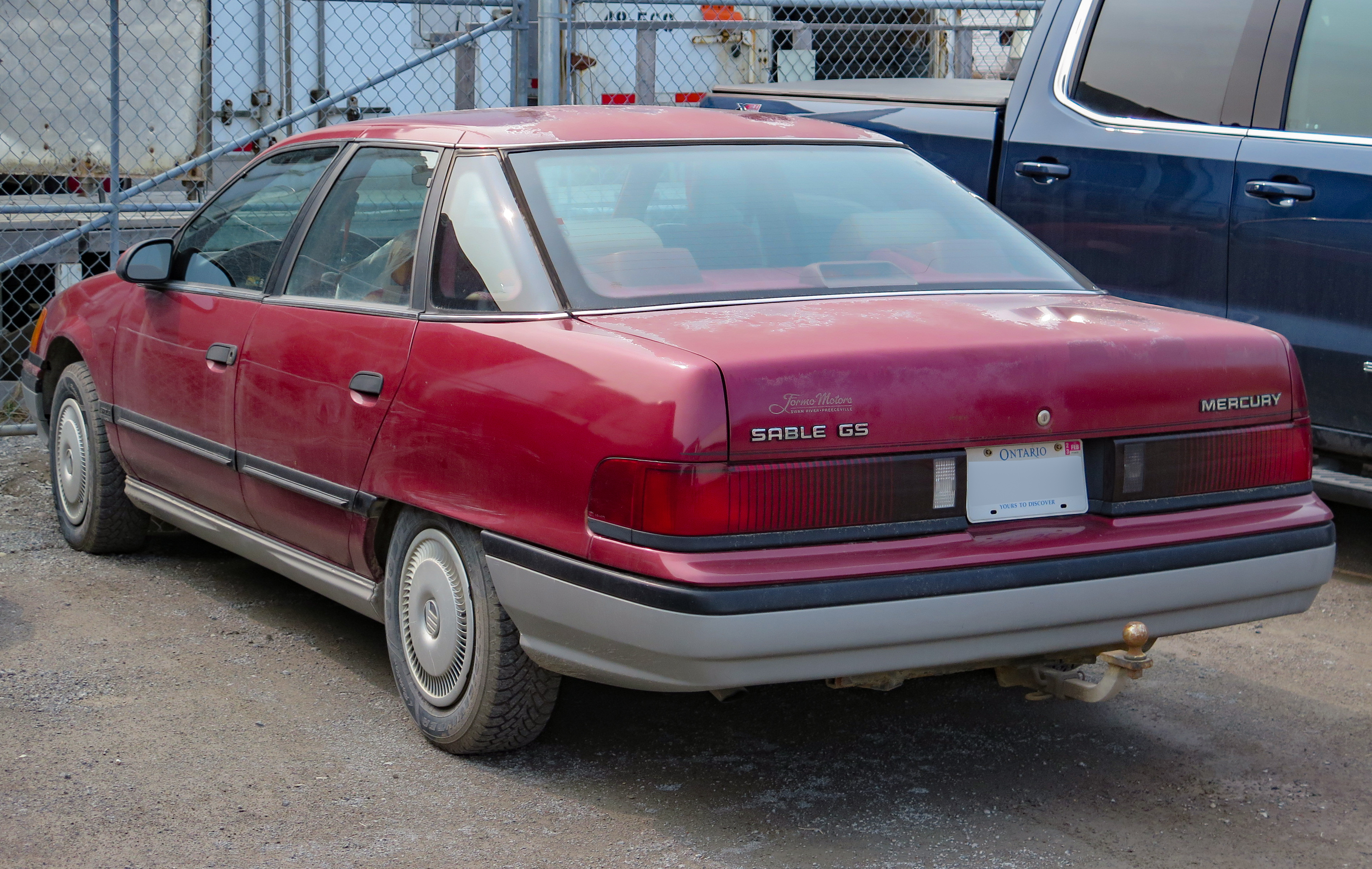
Sable sedan rear styling

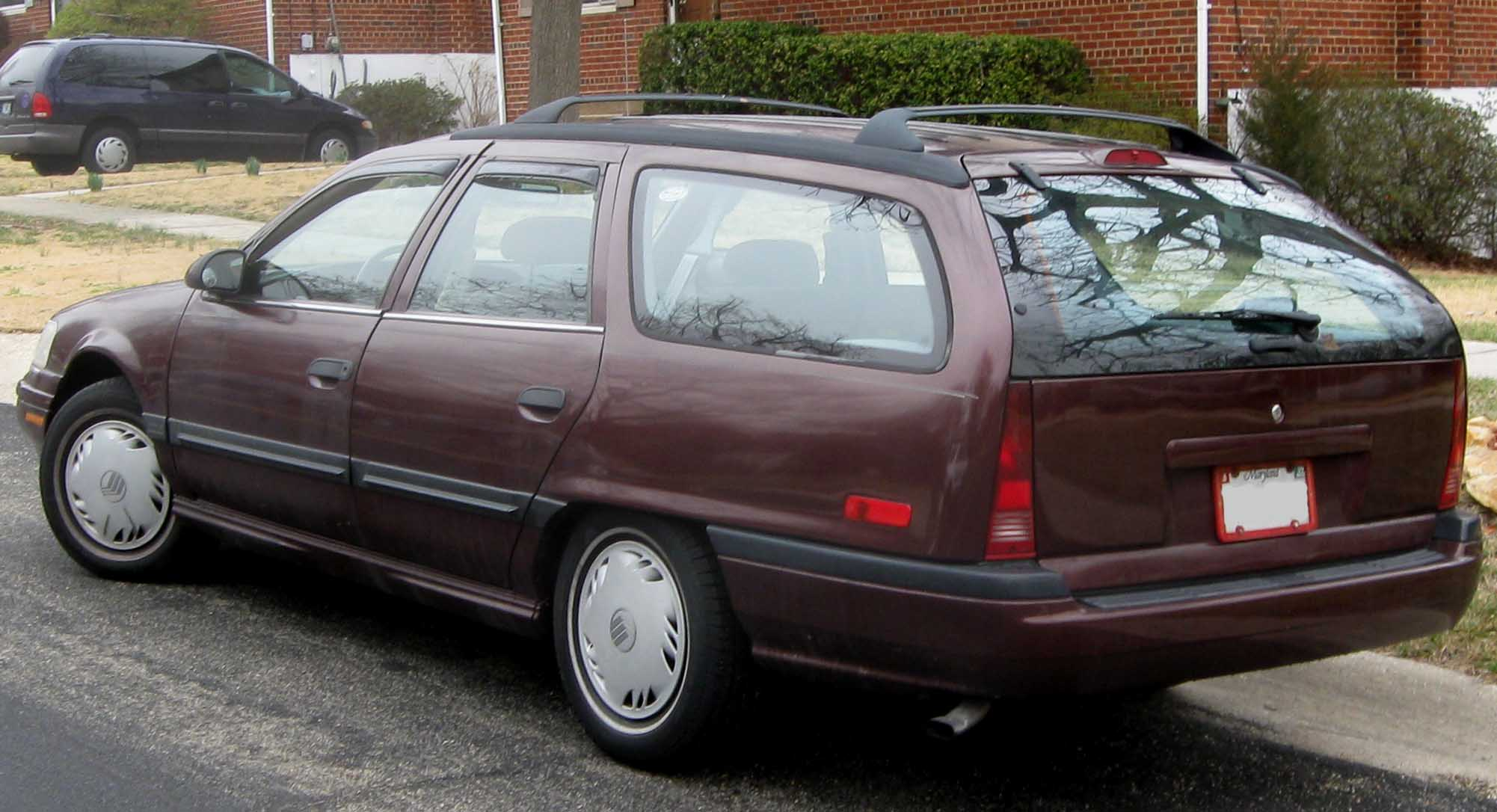
Sable wagon rear styling

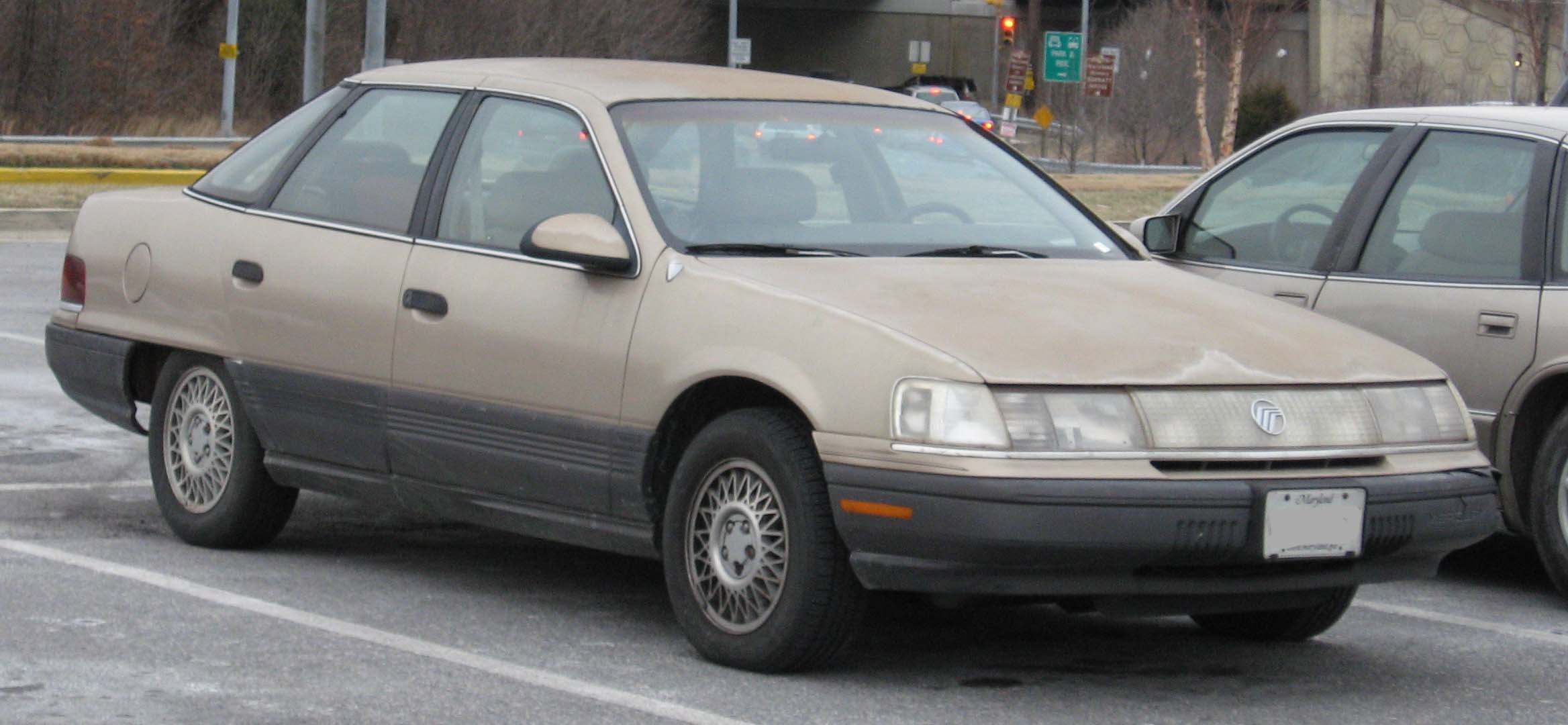
1989-1991 Sable LS sedan

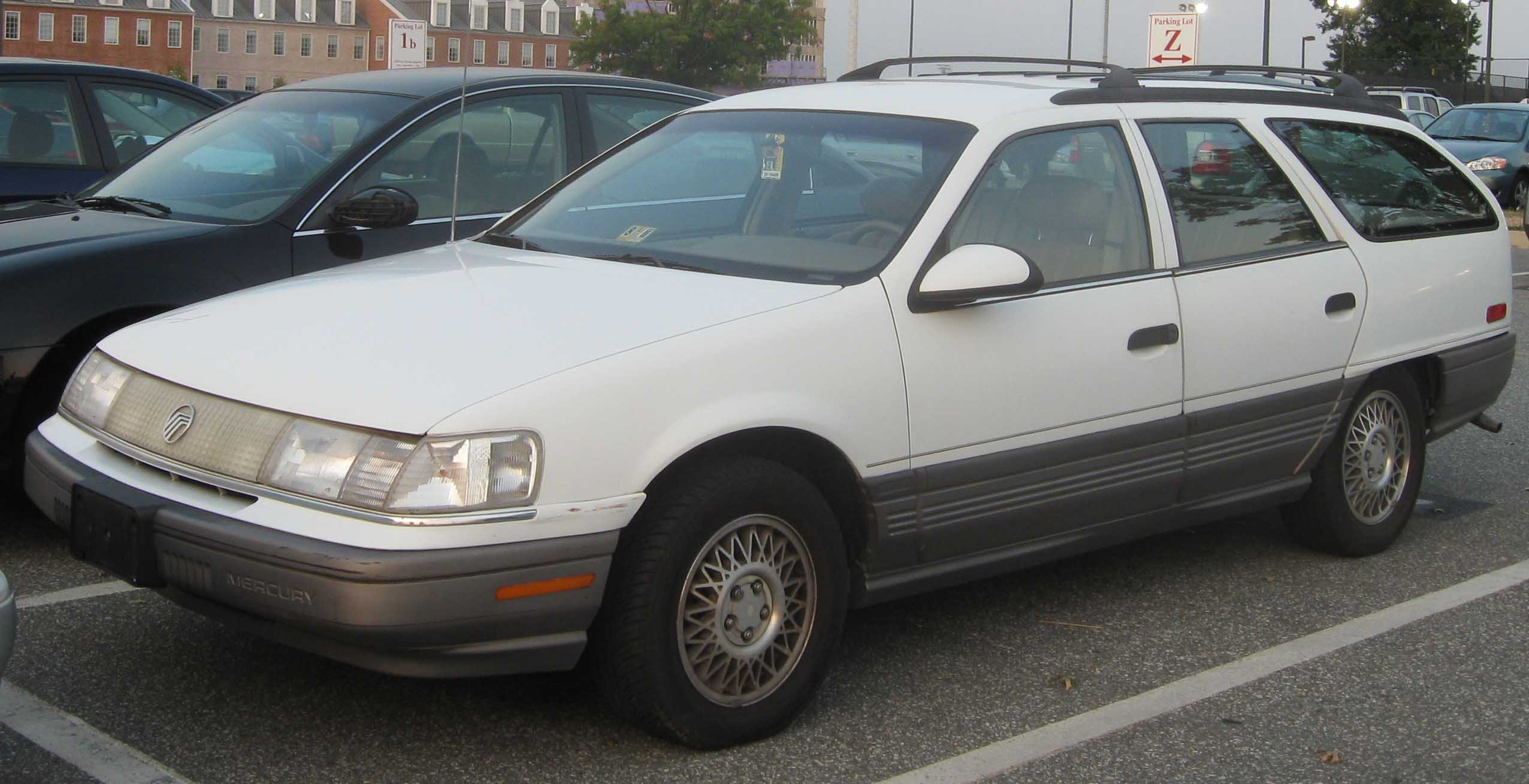
1989-1991 Sable LS wagon

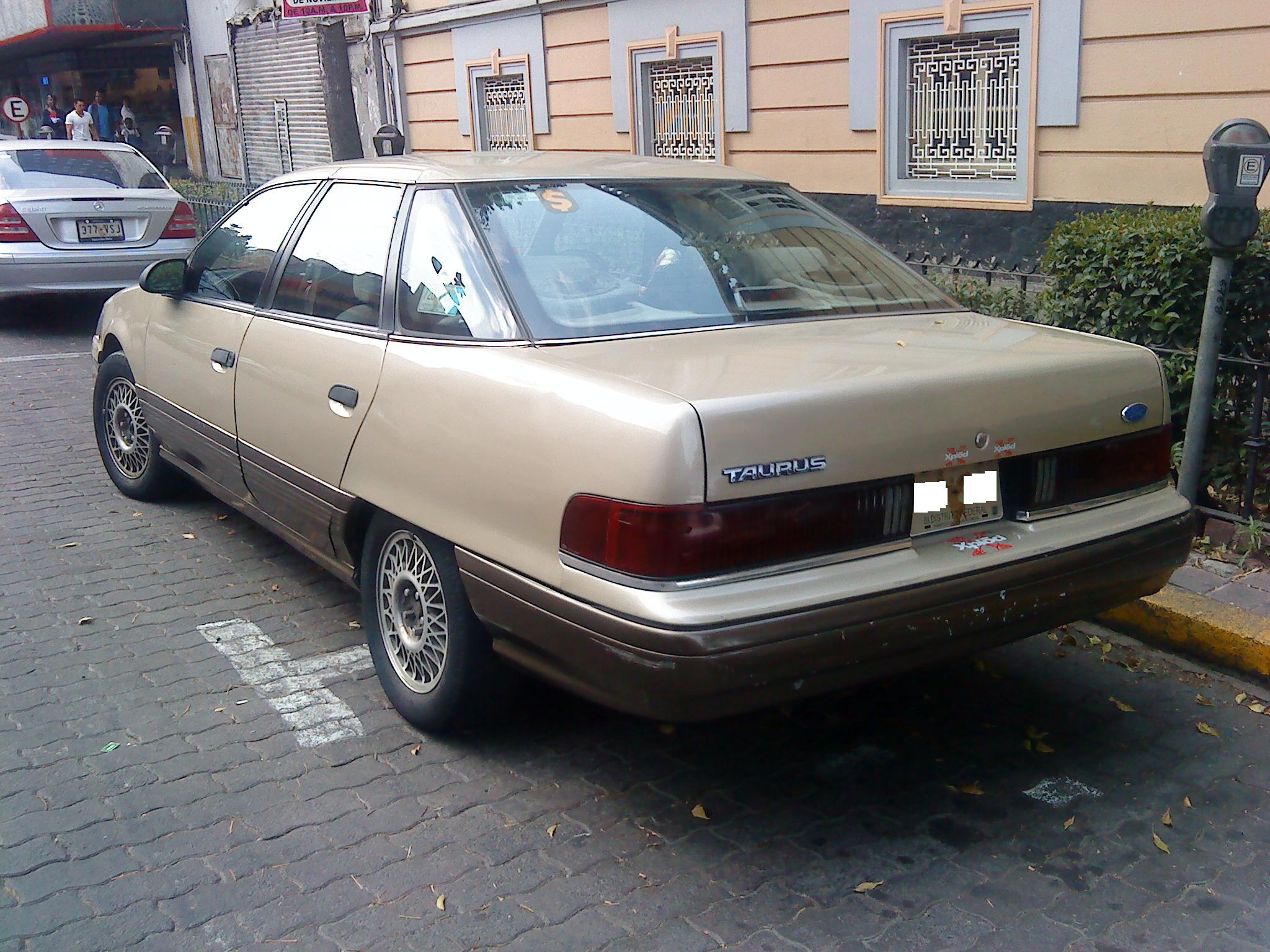
1990 Ford Taurus (Mexico); rebadged Mercury Sable LS

=== Trim ===
The first-generation Mercury Sable was sold in two trim levels (opposed to the four of the Taurus). In line with other Mercury models, a base-trim GS (comparable to the GL-trim Taurus) and top-trim LS (slightly above the Taurus LX) was offered. The station wagon shared both trim levels with the sedans, but was not available with exterior woodgrain trim (ending the Mercury use of the Brougham name).

As Mercury never offered the first-generation Sable with a manual transmission, no Mercury Sable equivalent to the Taurus MT-5 nor the Taurus SHO was ever introduced.

=== Production ===
1986–1991 Mercury Sable Production
| Model year | Total |
|---|---|
| 1986 | 95,635 |
| 1987 | 121,313 |
| 1988 | 121,285 |
| 1989 | 130,657 |
| 1990 | 103,749 |
| 1991 | 96,698 |
Total: 669,337

== Second generation (1992–1995) ==
Second generation
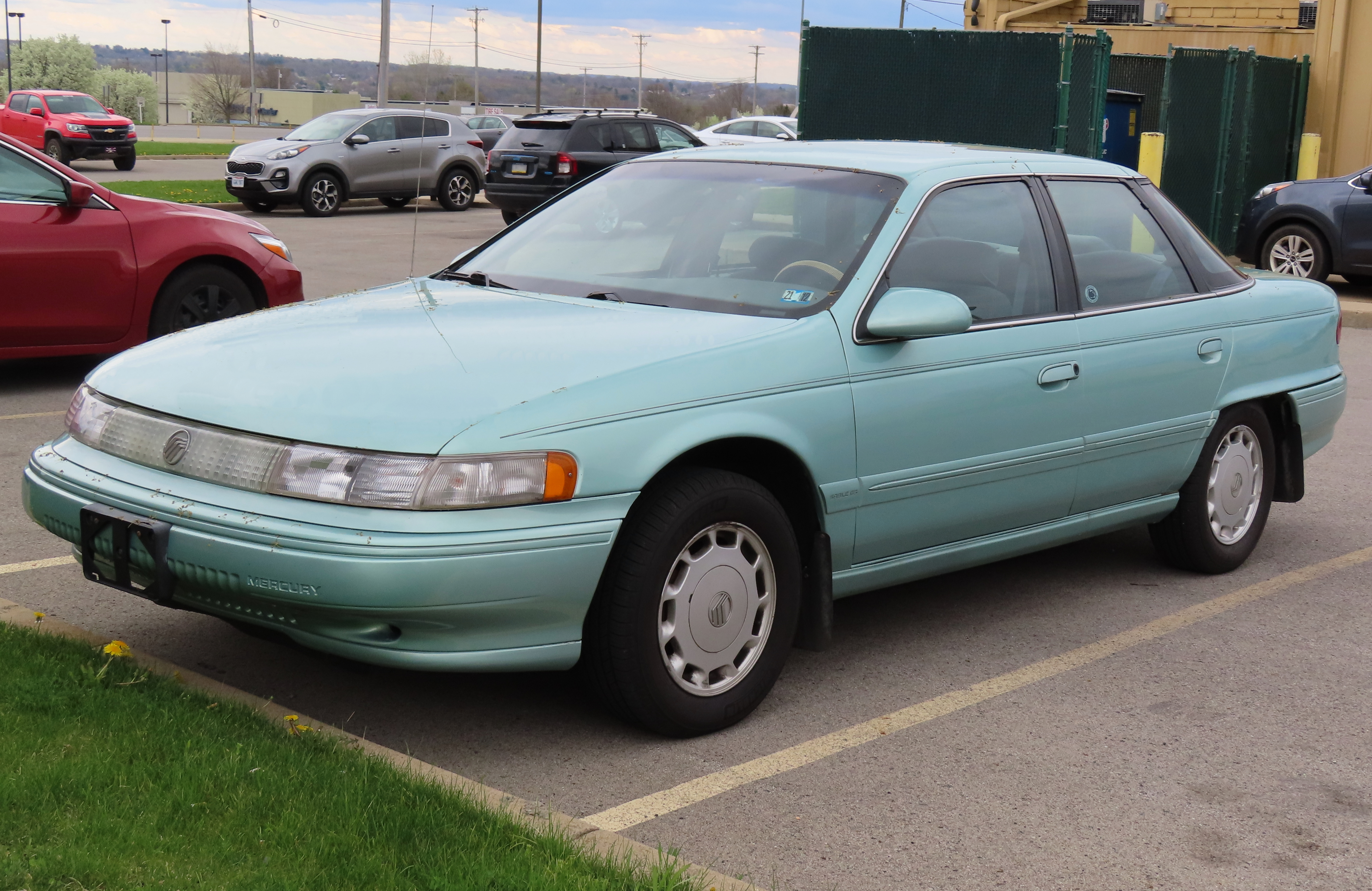
- 1995 Mercury Sable GS sedan

Overview
- Production: 1991–1995
- Assembly: Atlanta, Georgia; Chicago, Illinois
- Designer: Jack Telnack

Body and chassis
- Body style: 4-door sedan 4-door station wagon
- Layout: FF layout
- Platform: Ford DN5 Platform
- Related: Ford Taurus; Lincoln Continental; Ford Windstar

Powertrain
- Engine: 3.0 L Vulcan V6; 3.8 L Essex V6
- Transmission: 4-speed AXOD-E/AX4S automatic 4-speed AX4N automatic

Dimensions
- Wheelbase: 106 in (2,692 mm)
- Length: 192.2 in (4,882 mm) (sedan); 193.2 in (4,907 mm) (wagon)
- Width: 71.2 in (1,808 mm)
- Height: 54.4 in (1,382 mm) (sedan); 55.5 in (1,410 mm) (wagon)

For the 1992 model year, the second-generation Sable was introduced. As part of a $650 million investment in the Taurus and Sable, both model lines received significant updates, focusing on the interior and front and rear fascias. In contrast to the previous Sable, Ford chose an evolutionary change for the model line; though visibly similar to the previous generation, every body panel on the Sable sedan (except the doors) was changed. On the station wagon (shared with both the Sable and Taurus), the front fascia was redesigned, along with the interior.

The interior of the Sable underwent a redesign of the door panels, dashboard, and interior controls. Following the 1990 addition of a driver-side airbag, the Sable gained a passenger-side airbag as an option for 1992 (becoming standard in 1993). For 1993, the steering wheel was redesigned (returning the horn to the center of the steering wheel).

The base "GS" and luxury "LS" trim levels were carried over from the previous generation. A front cloth bench seat was standard on GS sedans and wagons, although cloth bucket seats were available on GS sedans only. Higher-end cloth bucket seats were standard on LS sedans, but a bench seat was a no cost option. A front bench was standard on LS wagons, with bucket seats optional. Leather seating surfaces were available on all LS Sables.

In 1992 for MY 1993, unpopular optional features such as the "InstaClear" heated windshield were eliminated. For 3.0L V6 engines, the drive belt system became a single-belt setup for 1993 (previously, the 3.0L alternator had used a separate belt). Also, some 3.0L 1994 models began receiving the new AX4N transmission.

The wagon version was available with mostly the same options as the sedan versions. Wagons had a maximum of 81.1 cubic feet of cargo area with the 60/40 split rear seat folded down. They featured a 2-way liftgate (raise the entire liftgate or just the window), a roof rack with crossbar and tie-downs, an optional rear-facing third seat, a lockable under-floor compartment, and an optional fold-out picnic table. With both rear split seats in the upright position, standard cargo capacity was 45.7 cubic feet. Wagons that were equipped with the front bench seat and rear folding seat could seat eight people; while over two feet shorter than the 1991 Mercury Colony Park, the Sable wagon became the sole eight-passenger vehicle offered by Lincoln-Mercury (as the Mercury Villager minivan seated seven).

1995 was the final model year of the second-generation Sable; the rare LTS trim level was added. It featured leather bucket seats, Taurus LX–style alloy wheels, special cladding, and many leather wrapped interior trim parts. The LTS trim had either the standard 3.0 L Vulcan V6 or the optional 3.8 L Essex V6.

=== Models ===
| Model | Year | Transmission | Engine | Power | Torque |
|---|---|---|---|---|---|
| GS; LS | 1992–1995 | 4-speed AXOD-E (AX4S) automatic 4-speed AX4N automatic (some 1994-95) | 3.0 L SFI Vulcan V6 | 140 hp (104 kW) | 160 lb⋅ft (217 N⋅m) |
| LTS | 1995 | 4-speed AXOD-E (AX4S) automatic 4-speed AX4N automatic (some 1994-95) | 3.0 L SFI Vulcan V6 | 140 hp (104 kW) | 160 lb⋅ft (217 N⋅m) |
| LTS | 1995 | 4-speed AXOD-E (AX4S) automatic 4-speed AX4N automatic (some 1994-95) | 3.8 L Essex V6 | 140 hp (104 kW) | 215 lb⋅ft (292 N⋅m) |

=== Production ===
1992-1995 Mercury Sable Production
| Model year | Total |
|---|---|
| 1992 | 127,530 |
| 1993 | 138,980 |
| 1994 | 112,783 |
| 1995 | 115,763 |
Total: 495,056

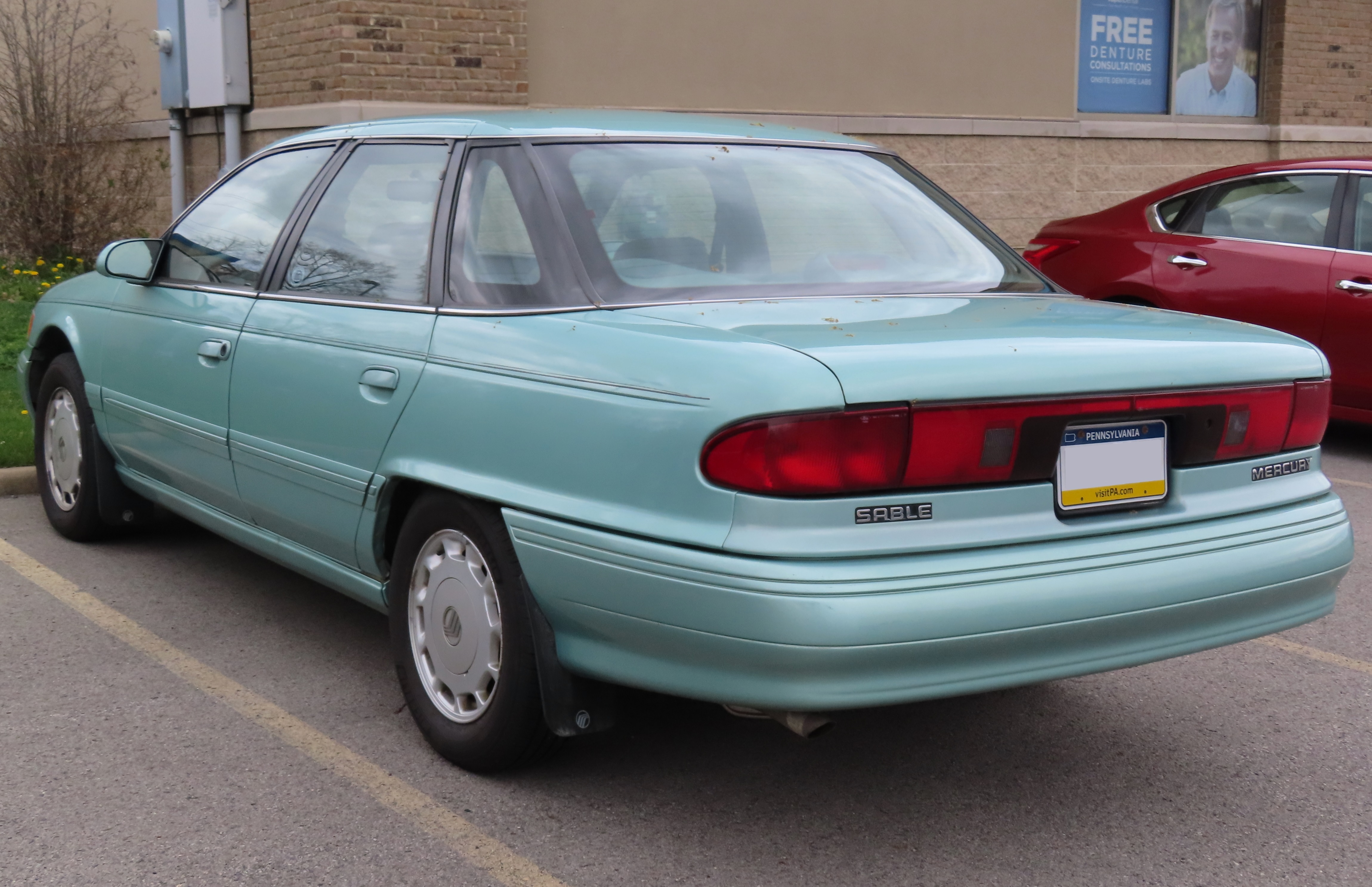
Sable sedan rear styling

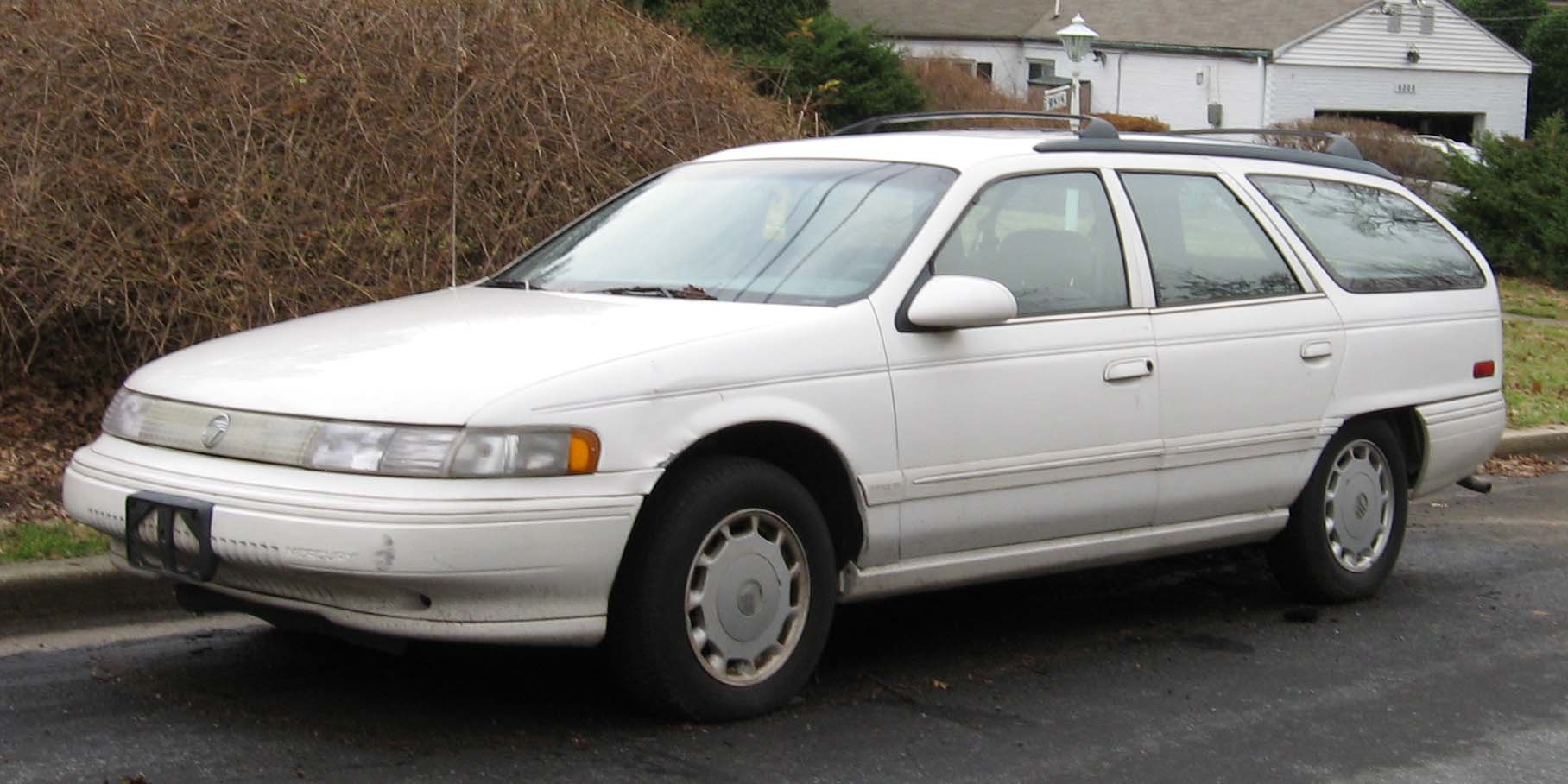
Sable wagon

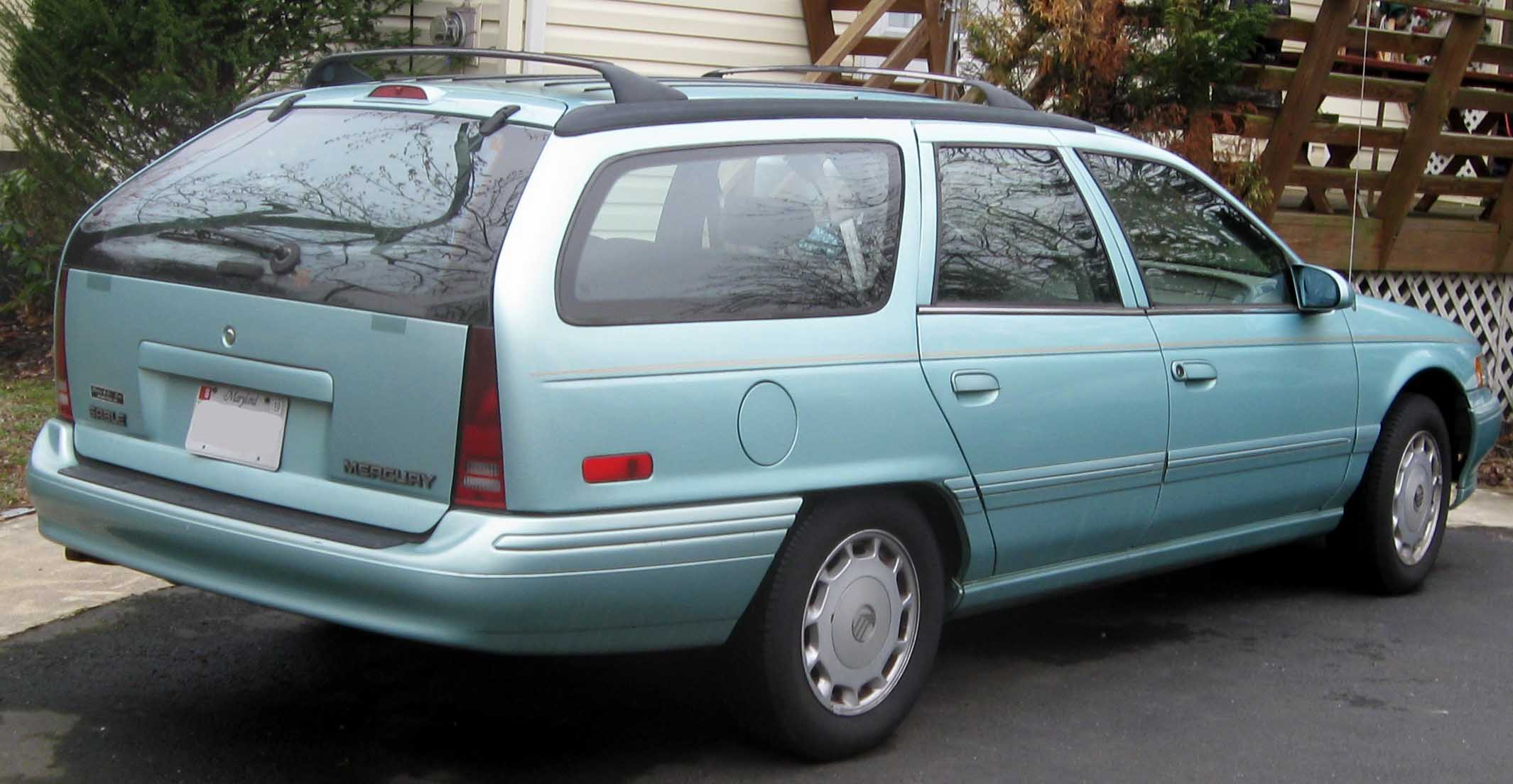
Sable wagon rear styling

== Third generation (1996–1999) ==
Third generation
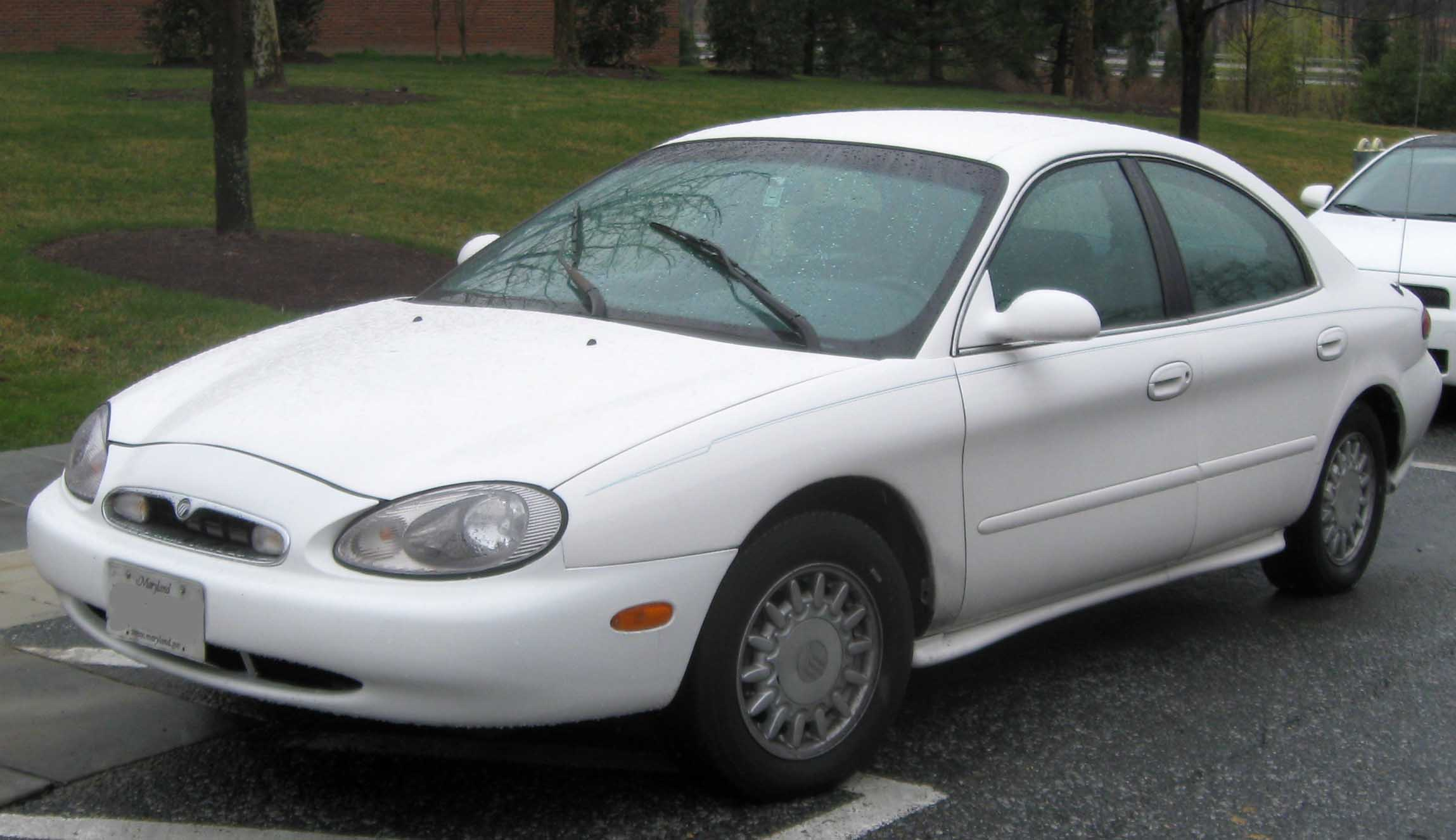
- 1996–1997 Sable

Overview
- Production: June 1995 – 1999
- Assembly: Atlanta, Georgia; Chicago, Illinois
- Designer: Jack Telnack

Body and chassis
- Body style: 4-door sedan 4-door station wagon
- Layout: FF layout
- Platform: Ford DN101 platform
- Related: Ford Taurus; Lincoln Continental; Ford Windstar

Powertrain
- Engine: 3.0 L Vulcan V6; 3.0 L Duratec V6
- Transmission: 4-speed AX4N automatic

Dimensions
- Wheelbase: 108.5 in (2,756 mm)
- Length: 199.7 in (5,072 mm) (sedan); 199.1 in (5,057 mm) (station wagon)
- Width: 73.0 in (1,854 mm)
- Height: 55.4 in (1,407 mm) (sedan); 57.6 in (1,463 mm) (station wagon)

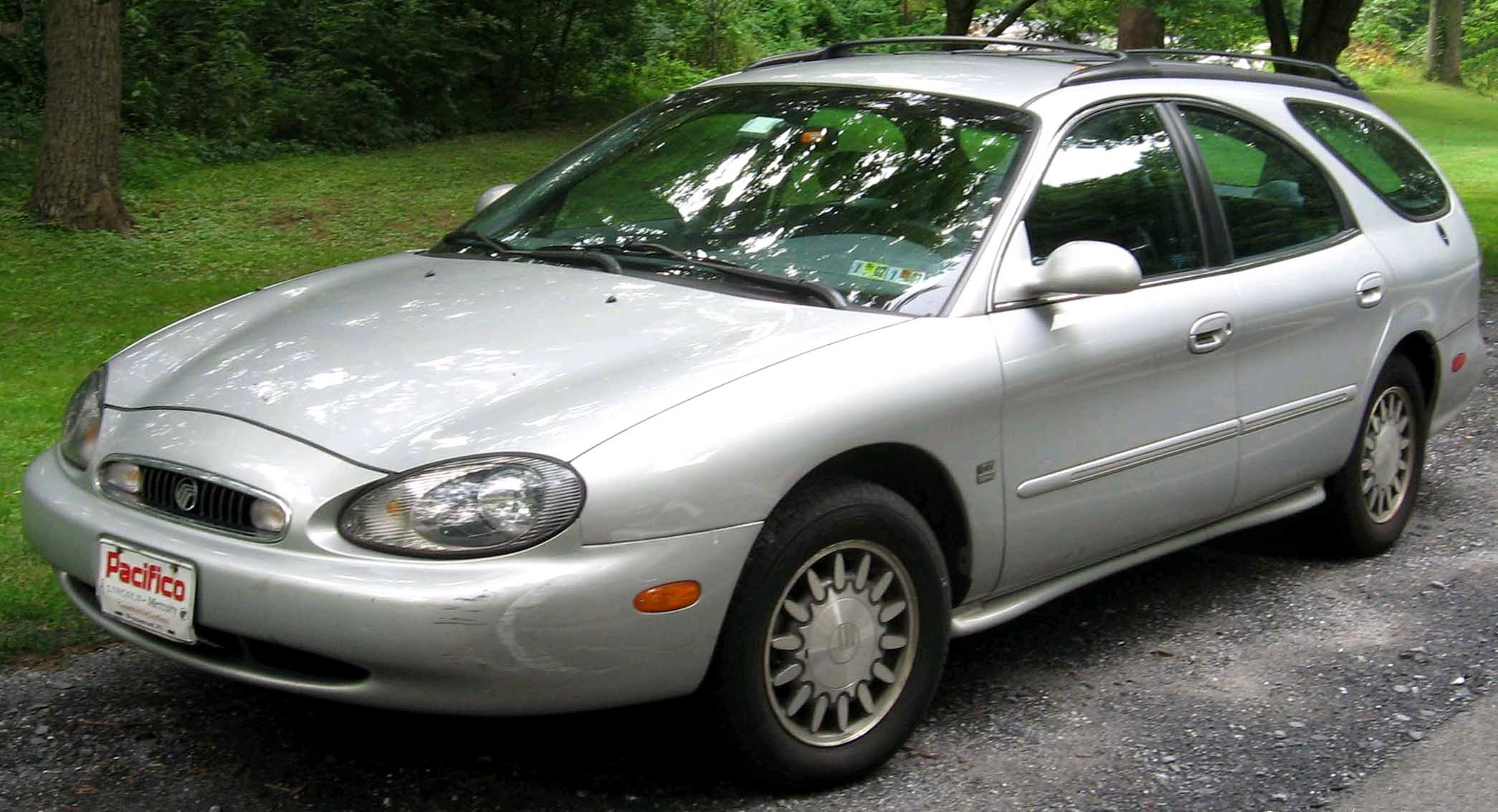
1998-1999 Mercury Sable LS wagon

The third-generation Sable was introduced for the 1996 model year. The platform used for the previous two generations underwent an extensive revision, redesignated as the DN101 platform; the wheelbase was extended from 106 to 108.5 inches. As before, the Sable returned as a four-door sedan and five-door station wagon.

While mechanically identical to its Ford Taurus counterpart, the sedans of the two model lines shared less sheetmetal than before, with only the front doors, hood, and front fenders common between the Taurus and Sable (as before, the Sable served as the basis for Ford and Mercury station wagons). In contrast to the oval-influenced roofline of the Ford Taurus, the Sable was styled with a sloped roofline with a rectangular rear window; the model received its own front and rear fascias. In place of the long-running lightbar, the Sable received a chrome-trimmed grille with oval headlight housings. In a design first for the model line, the Sable was fitted with the same interior as the Taurus (with the exception of seat fabrics).

The trim lines saw a minor revision, with the Sable G introduced as a new entry-level model and the Sable LTS discontinued. The Sable G was offered solely as a sedan, with several standard power options (but only an AM/FM radio). For higher sales volumes, the GS and LS made their return, offered both in sedan and station wagon form. For the Sable G and GS, the standard engine was the 3.0 L Vulcan V6, producing 145 hp. For the Sable LS, the standard engine was a 3.0 L DOHC Duratec V6, producing 200 hp; optional in the Sable GS, the Duratec engine was an enlarged version of the engine from the Mercury Mystique.

For 1997, the Sable underwent several cost-cutting revisions; several features of the LS became available on the GS as options. For 1998, the Sable underwent a mid-cycle revision, distinguished by new headlights and a centered Mercury emblem in the grille; the Sable G was discontinued. The Vulcan V6 engine became standard on all Sables, with the Duratec optional only on the LS for 1999. In an effort to stimulate sales, Mercury cut the price of the Sable by up to $2,000 for 1999 (by revising the availability of options).

=== Models ===
| Model | Year | Engine | Power | Torque | Transmission |
|---|---|---|---|---|---|
| G | 1996–1997 | 3.0 L SFI Vulcan V6 | 145 hp (108 kW) | 170 lb⋅ft (230 N⋅m) | 4-speed AX4S automatic 4-speed AX4N automatic |
| G | 1996–1997 | 3.0 L DOHC Duratec 30 V6 | 200 hp (149 kW) | 200 lb⋅ft (271 N⋅m) | 4-speed AX4S automatic 4-speed AX4N automatic |
| LS | 1996–1999 | 3.0 L DOHC Duratec 30 V6 | 200 hp (149 kW) | 200 lb⋅ft (271 N⋅m) | 4-speed AX4S automatic 4-speed AX4N automatic |
| GS | 1996–1999 | 3.0 L SFI Vulcan V6 | 145 hp (108 kW) | 170 lb⋅ft (230 N⋅m) | 4-speed AX4S automatic 4-speed AX4N automatic |
| GS | 1996–1999 | 3.0 L DOHC Duratec 30 V6 | 200 hp (149 kW) | 200 lb⋅ft (271 N⋅m) | 4-speed AX4S automatic 4-speed AX4N automatic |

== Fourth generation (2000–2005) ==
Fourth generation
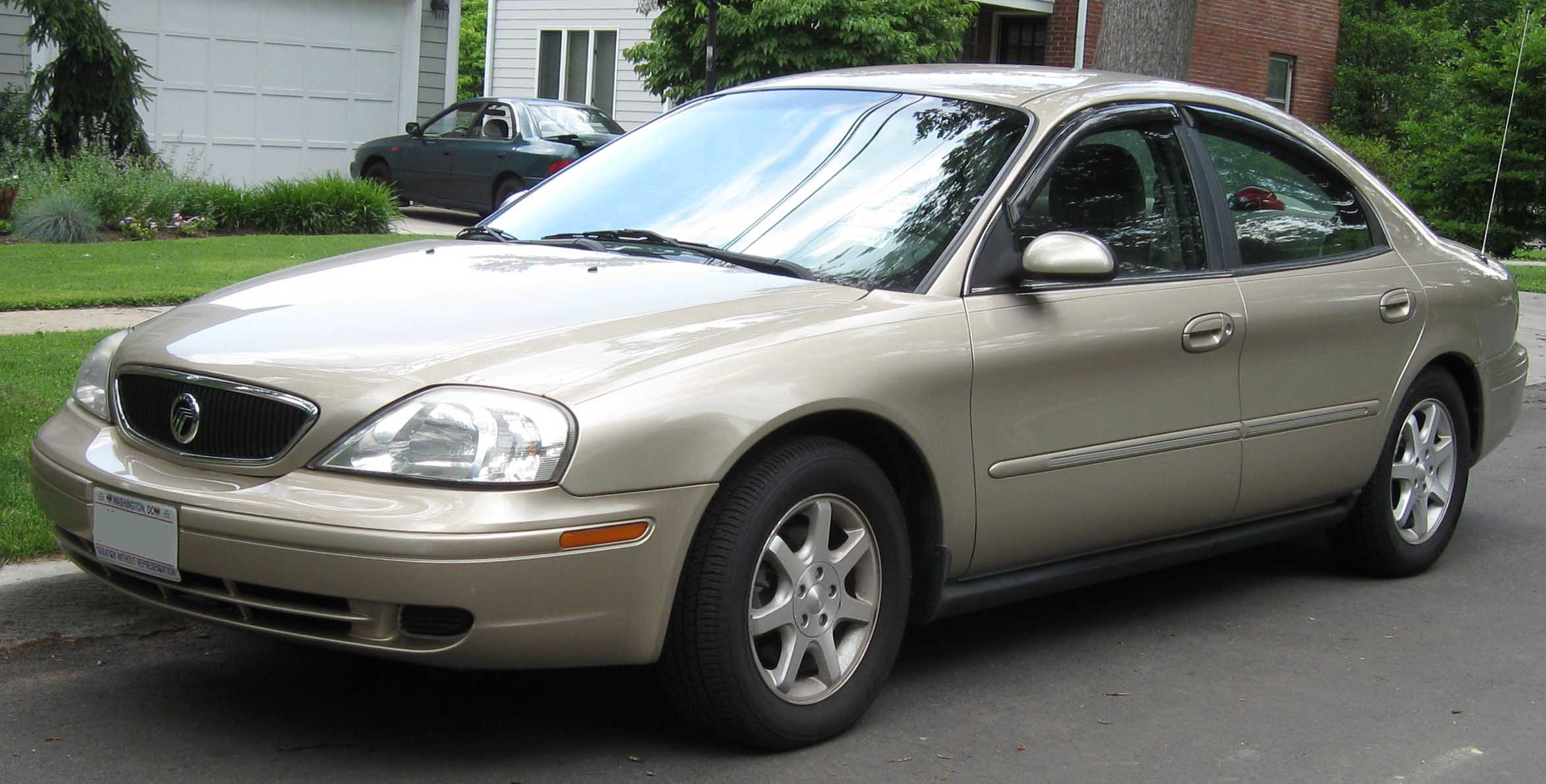
- 2000–2003 Sable GS

Overview
- Also called: Ford Sable (Mexico)
- Production: 2000–2005
- Assembly: Atlanta, Georgia; Chicago, Illinois

Body and chassis
- Body style: 4-door sedan 4-door station wagon
- Layout: FF layout
- Platform: Ford D186 platform
- Related: Ford Taurus; Lincoln Continental

Powertrain
- Engine: 3.0 L Vulcan V6; 3.0 L Duratec V6
- Transmission: 4-speed AX4N automatic

Dimensions
- Wheelbase: 108.5 in (2,756 mm)
- Length: 197.8 in (5,024 mm) (station wagon); 199.8 in (5,075 mm) (sedan)
- Width: 73.0 in (1,854 mm)
- Height: 57.8 in (1,468 mm) (station wagon); 55.5 in (1,410 mm) (sedan)
- Curb weight: 3,375 lb (1,531 kg) (sedan)

Chronology
- Successor: Mercury Milan; Mercury Montego

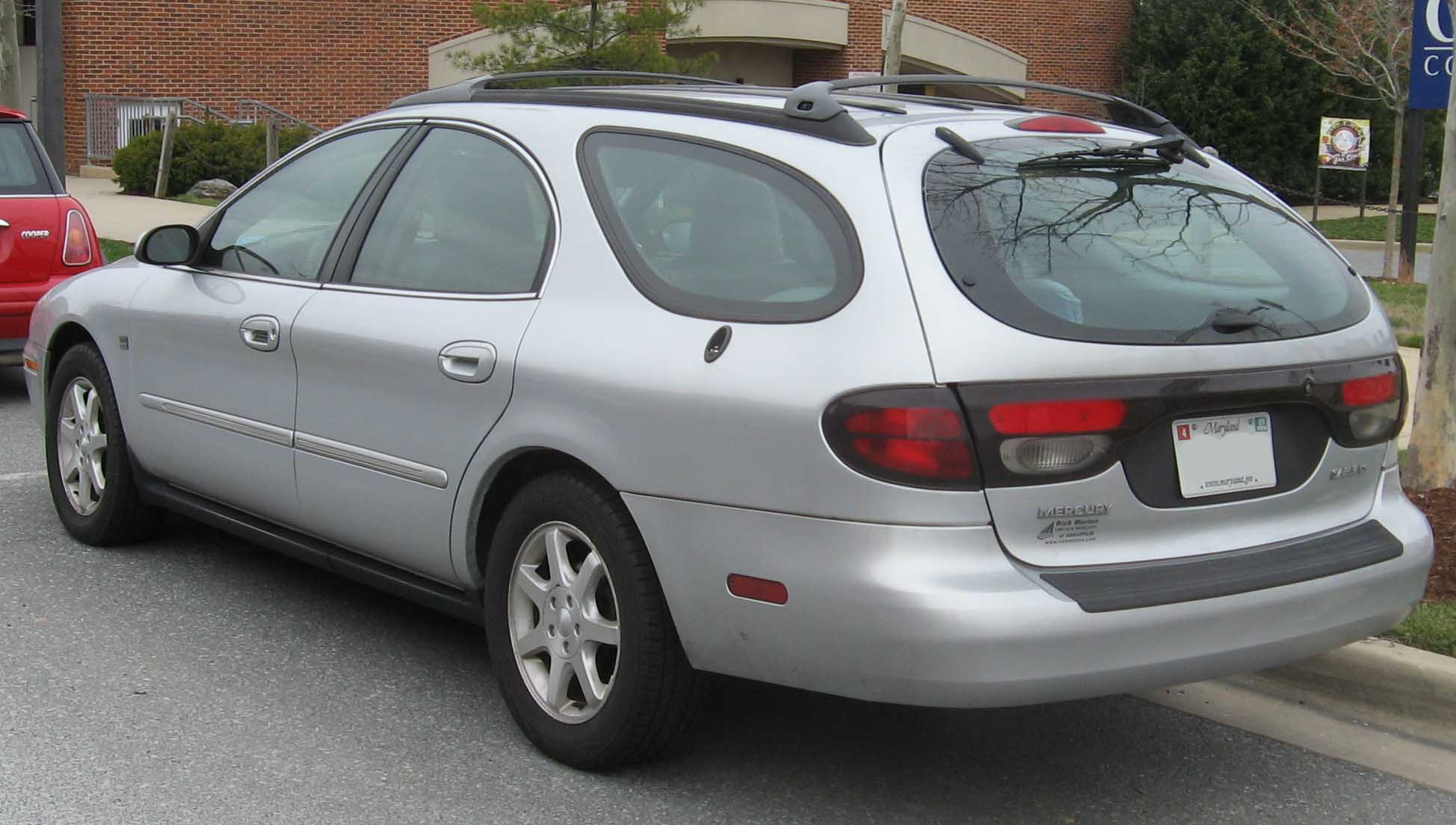
2000–2003 Mercury Sable LS wagon

The Sable received another redesign in late 1999 for the 2000 model year, which minimized some of the oval design elements from the 1996 model, replacing them with more conventional styling. The redesign also featured a taller roof over the rear-passenger space, to increase passenger headroom that had been sacrificed by the tapered 1996 design. The taller and roomier trunk also served to make the vehicle more functional. The interior was completely changed for a much more conservative design. Certain elements of the interior were retained from the 1996 model, such as the integrated control console, which combined the sound system and climate controls into one panel; but the shape of that panel was changed from the controversial oval to a more conventional and conservative trapezoid. The suspension was also softened to appeal to a broader, non-sporting audience. To reduce the price and increase profitability, many features such as four-wheel disc brakes were eliminated on the sedan; station wagons retained four-wheel disc brakes.

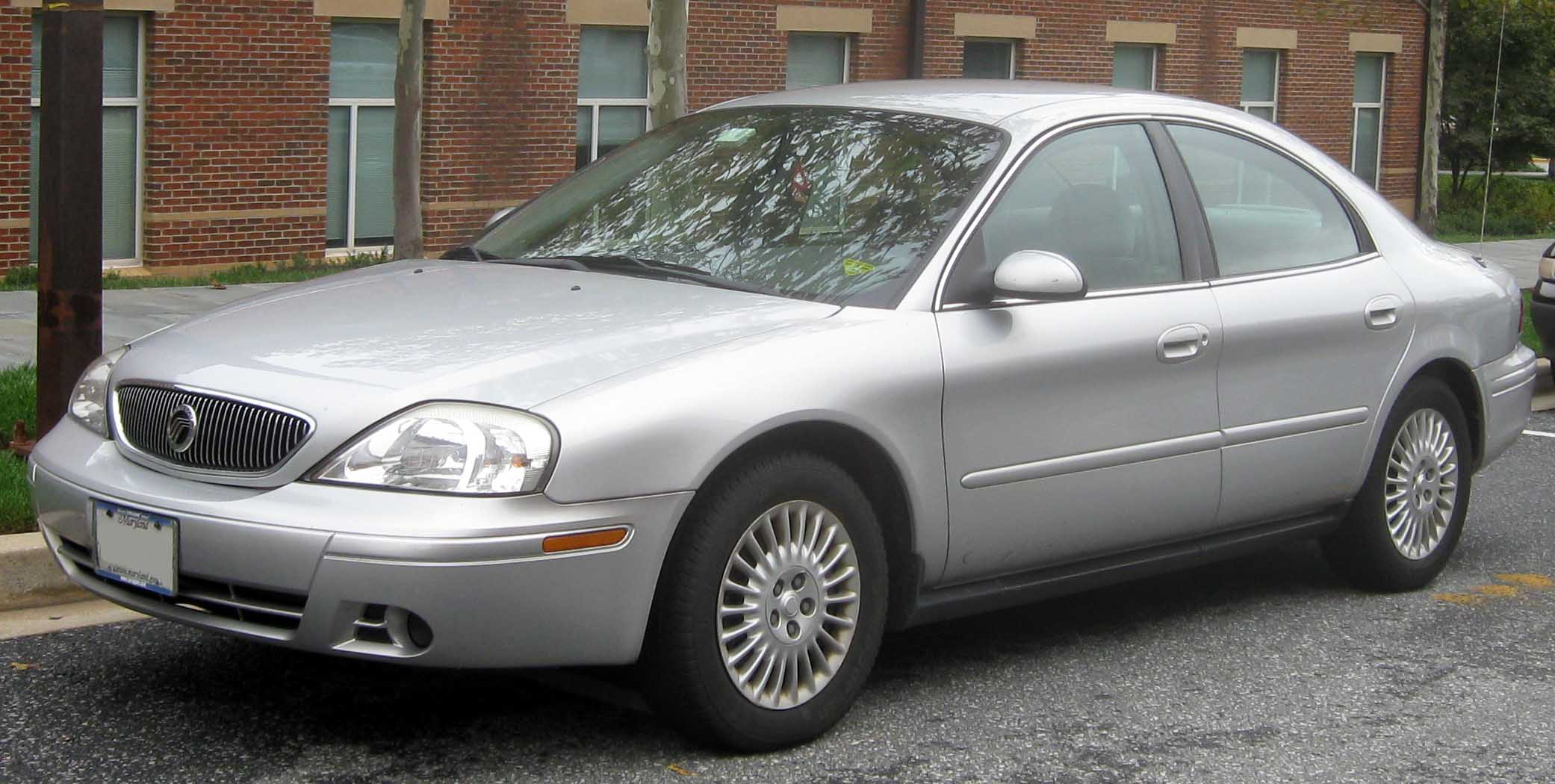
2004–2005 Mercury Sable GS sedan

The 2002 Sable included extra equipment on every trim level, including a CD player and power driver's seat on the GS, and a power moonroof or leather interior on the LS. Side airbags and traction control were added as options on all models. For 2004, the Sable received minor cosmetic changes to the front and rear fascias; most noticeably, the grille was made fully chrome. Inside were a new instrument cluster and steering wheel.

Due to the Mercury brand's discontinuation in Canada, the fourth generation Sable was never available in the Canadian market; thus, it was unique to the U.S. and Mexico.

The 2005 Mercury Montego and 2006 Milan were launched as replacements for the Sable. Shortly after the Montego's introduction the Sable was discontinued, along with the Taurus wagon; the Taurus sedan continued to be produced, but primarily for the fleet market. The last Sable left the Atlanta plant on April 29, 2005.

=== Models ===
| Model | Year | Engine | Power | Torque | Transmission |
|---|---|---|---|---|---|
| GS | 2000–2005 | 3.0 L SFI Vulcan V6 | 155 hp (116 kW) | 185 lb⋅ft (251 N⋅m) | 4-speed AX4N automatic |
| GS | 2000–2005 | 3.0 L DOHC Duratec 30 V6 | 200 hp (149 kW) | 195 lb⋅ft (264 N⋅m) | 4-speed AX4N automatic |
| LS | 2000–2005 | 3.0 L DOHC Duratec 30 V6 | 200 hp (149 kW) | 195 lb⋅ft (264 N⋅m) | 4-speed AX4N automatic |

== Fifth generation (2008–2009) ==
Fifth generation
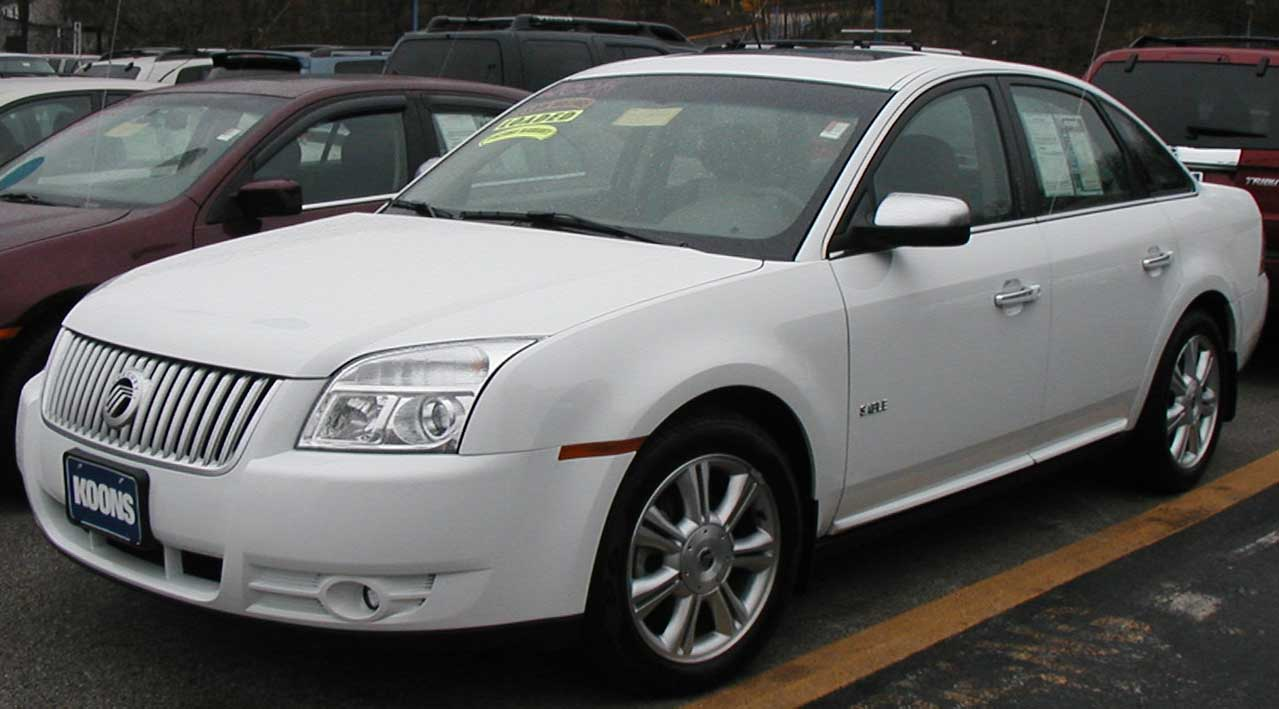
- 2008 Sable Premier

Overview
- Also called: Mercury Montego (Middle East)
- Production: 2007–2009
- Assembly: Chicago, Illinois
- Designer: J Mays

Body and chassis
- Body style: 4-door sedan
- Layout: Front engine, front-wheel drive / four-wheel drive
- Platform: Ford D3 platform
- Related: Lincoln MKS; Volvo S60; Volvo XC90; Ford Taurus; Ford Taurus X Ford Flex

Powertrain
- Engine: 3.5 L Cyclone V6
- Transmission: 6-speed 6F automatic

Dimensions
- Wheelbase: 112.9 in (2,868 mm)
- Length: 202.1 in (5,133 mm)
- Width: 74.5 in (1,892 mm)
- Height: 61.5 in (1,562 mm)
- Curb weight: 3,643 lb (1,652 kg) (FWD); 3,814 lb (1,730 kg) (AWD)

Chronology
- Predecessor: Mercury Montego

The fifth-generation Mercury Sable was launched for the 2008 model year. Developed as a mid-cycle update of the Mercury Montego, the production vehicle revived the more widely-recognized Sable nameplate at the 2007 Chicago Auto Show. While the 2008 revival of the Ford Taurus (renaming the Five Hundred) largely ended retail sale of the Crown Victoria, the Sable remained below the Grand Marquis in the Mercury range.

While approximately 10 inches shorter and 500 pounds lighter than the Grand Marquis, the fifth-generation Sable was the first produced as a full-size car. For the first time, the model line was offered exclusively as a four-door sedan (no Mercury counterpart of the Taurus X wagon was developed). Front-wheel drive remained standard, with all-wheel drive becoming an option for the first time.

In the transition from the Montego to the Sable, a number of changes were made to the body and chassis. Alongside the addition of the 263 hp 3.5L V6 and 6-speed 6F automatic, the exterior underwent several revisions, including a revised front bumper and grille, redesigned headlamps; the LED taillamps were retained, but given white lenses. The fifth-generation Sable adopted the trim lines of the Montego and Milan, with an unnamed standard trim level and a top Premier trim.

=== Water pump issues ===
Water pumps on the 2008 and 2009 Mercury Sable equipped with the 3.5 L Ford Cyclone V6 have a tendency to fail and potentially ruin the engine when they do. The water pumps on these engines are internally mounted and driven by the timing chain. As a result, when they fail, antifreeze is dumped directly into the crankcase; mixing with engine oil and potentially damaging the head gaskets and connecting rod bearings. These water pump failures could occur without warning, and repair could require engine disassembly or removal to access the water pump, or in some cases, engine replacement. A class action lawsuit was filed against Ford as a result of this issue.

=== Models ===
| Model | Year | Engine | Power | Torque | Transmission |
|---|---|---|---|---|---|
| Base; Premier | 2008–2009 | 3.5 L Cyclone V6 | 263 hp (196 kW) | 249 lb⋅ft (338 N⋅m) | 6-speed 6F automatic |

== Special editions ==
On an official basis, several special editions of the model line were designed; all were developed from the first generation.

The LS Monochrome Edition special edition was offered as an option for 1987. As an appearance package on a white-painted car, the bumpers, side trim, and wheels were also painted white; the production quantity is not known.

For the 1989 Detroit Auto Show, Mercury created a Sable two-door convertible. The vehicle was built from a Sable sedan body (with the front doors lengthened 12 inches); to better accommodate the components of the power-folding top, the trailing-arm rear suspension of the Sable station wagon was utilized. Along with a power-folding convertible top and low-profile tonneau cover, the interior was fitted with seatback-mounted television screens. The only example ever built, the 1988 Sable two-door convertible was placed into storage during the 1990s. In the early 2000s, it was given a VIN (allowing it to be titled and licensed), allowing it to be driven on public roads. After being sold on eBay in 2006, the vehicle has served as a display vehicle in a Texas automobile dealership and shown at auto shows.

=== 50th Anniversary Edition/Sable LTS ===
To commemorate the 50th anniversary of the Mercury brand for 1989, a 50th Anniversary Edition of the Sable was sold. Combined between highly-optioned GS and LS trims, only 50 examples were sold; they are externally distinguished by "50th Anniversary" fender and trunklid badging (showing both its "Mercury Head" and its 1989 emblem).

Along with commemorating the milestone anniversary, the special-edition vehicles were a thinly veiled testbed for a planned Mercury luxury-sport counterpart of the Ford Taurus SHO called the Sable LTS. The LTS was intended to use the upgraded chassis, suspension, and interior of the SHO; instead of the Yamaha V6, it would use the 3.8L V6 from the police-package Taurus; the 50th Anniversary Sable was fitted with the suspension from the Taurus SHO.

Following the 1989 introduction of the SHO and much higher-than-expected demand for the variant, Ford shelved the Sable LTS to concentrate its resources on the SHO. For the second generation, the LTS was shelved until 1995. Instead of becoming the Mercury counterpart of the SHO (fitted with everything except its Yamaha V6 engine), the 1995 Sable LTS as a highly-optioned version of the Sable LS, featuring a console-shifted transmission and front bucket seats.
