= Quickclear =

Ford electrically heated windshield

Quickclear is a European trademark used by the Ford Motor Company for its electrically heated windshield technology. Instaclear was the name used sometimes in the United States.

== Background ==
First seen on the Rolls-Royce in 1969 then the 1985 Ford Scorpio/Granada Mk. III in Europe and the 1986 Ford Taurus/Mercury Sable in the U.S., the system uses a mesh of very thin heating wires, or a silver/zinc oxide coated film embedded between two layers of windscreen glass. The overall effect when operative was defogging and defrosting of the windscreen at a very high rate. Land Rover (UK) also fitted a similar screen to their Discovery range in the early 1990s, some of which were imported to Australia undetected by authorities, because at that stage they were not legal in any state. Owing to the high current draw, the system is engineered to operate only when the engine is running, and normally switches off after 10 minutes of operation. The metallic content of the glass has been shown to degrade the performance of certain windshield-mounted accessories, such as GPS navigators, telephone antennas and radar detectors.

== Performance ==
"Instaclear" was the introductory name on American models. In early promotional Ford sales literature for Europe, the feature was referred to simply as "Rapid Windscreen De-ice", but the "Quickclear" name began to appear from around 1989 onwards. The system can now be found as either standard equipment or an optional extra on most vehicles produced by Ford or its subsidiaries around the world, but in the U.S. market it was never popular. Besides the original Taurus/Sable, it appeared briefly in the Lincoln line in the early 1990s, and in some Land Rovers as well. GM has produced a somewhat similar system called Electriclear (ThermaTec in Opel/Vauxhall cars).

== Disadvantages ==
One problem with the system is that the heating elements can sometimes stop working, leaving one side of the screen uncleared. If this is the result of burn out, total replacement of the screen is the only remedy as the wires are actually embedded in the glass, (as opposed to a rear defogger, which can usually be repaired with conductive paint). The problem is sometimes caused by the power cable coming loose from its mounting near the base of the screen. The loose cable then catches on the windscreen wiper mechanism and fatigues over time. The remedy is then to reattach the wire to the foil at the base of the screen, but this can be problematic since the system requires such high current (~30 amps). This type of screen is also known to cause serious problems with tollway recording tags unless the tag is placed in the correct area behind the rear view mirror.

== See also ==
- Glass run channel
