= Midler v. Ford Motor Co. =

US supreme court case about voice impersonation

- Court: United States Court of Appeals for the Ninth Circuit
- Full case name: Bette Midler v. Ford Motor Company, et al
- Argued: February 4, 1988
- Decided: June 22, 1988
- Citations: 849 F.2d 460; 57 USLW 2053; 1988 Copr.L.Dec. (CCH) ¶ 26,313; 7 U.S.P.Q.2d 1398; 15 Media L. Rep. 1620

Court membership
- Judges sitting: Procter Ralph Hug Jr., Thomas Tang, John T. Noonan Jr.

Case opinions
- Majority: Noonan, joined by a unanimous court

External videos
- One of the offending advertisements that prompted Midler's lawsuit. This 1986 ad for the Mercury Sable features a remake of "Do You Want to Dance" sung by a singer whose voice has an uncanny resemblance to Midler's.

Midler v. Ford Motor Co., 849 F.2d 460 (9th Cir. 1988) is a United States Court of Appeals case in which Bette Midler sought remedy against Ford Motor Company for a series of commercials in the 1980s which used a Midler impersonator. The case caused people to ask if a unique feature, such as a voice, can distinguish someone or not; and if it can, must the impersonation of it be authorized?

== Background ==
Ford Motor created an ad campaign for the Mercury Sable that specifically was meant to inspire nostalgic sentiments through the use of famous songs from the 1970s sung by their original artists. When the original artists refused to accept, impersonators were used to sing the original songs for the commercials. Midler was asked to sing a famous song of hers for the commercial and refused. Subsequently, the company hired a voice-impersonator of Midler and carried on with using the song for the commercial, since it had been approved by the copyright-holder. Midler's image and likeness were not used in the commercial but many claimed the voice used sounded impeccably like Midler's.

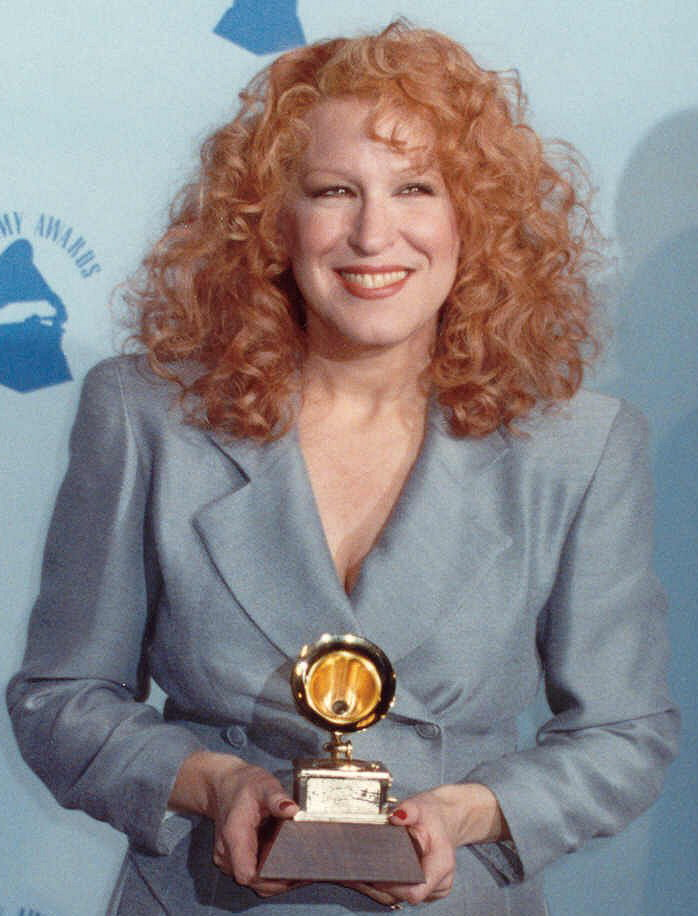
Midler backstage at the Grammy Awards, February 1990.

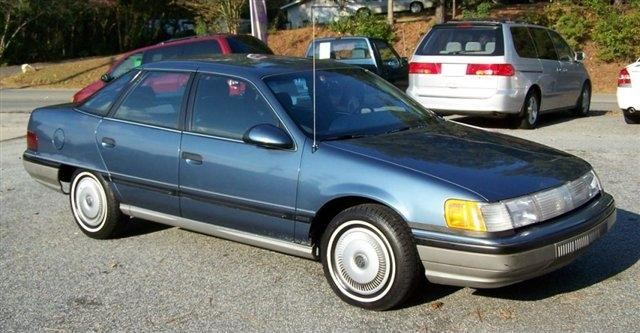
A 1986 Mercury Sable

Midler brought the case to a district court where she claimed that her voice was protected from appropriation and thus sought compensation. The district court claimed there was no legal principle preventing the use of her voice and granted summary judgment to Ford Motor. Midler appealed to the Appellate court, 9th Circuit.

== Case ==
Midler pursued a common law judgment against Ford for using her distinctive voice without her authorization. The appellate court pondered the question of whether or not an artist's voice is a distinctive personal feature over which a person has controlling rights from appropriation. Midler was not seeking damages for copyright infringement of the song itself, but rather for the use of her voice which she claimed was distinctive of her person as a singer. The recognition of Midler's voice in the commercial was found to be the intentional motivation and a major feature of the commercial.

== Decision ==
The appellate court ruled that the voice of someone famous as a singer is distinctive to their person and image and therefore, as a part of their identity, it is unlawful to imitate their voice without express consent and approval. The appellate court reversed the district court's decision and ruled in favor of Midler, indicating her voice was protected against unauthorized use.

== Significance ==
A voice, or other distinctive uncopyrightable features, is deemed as part of someone's identity who is famous for that feature and is thus controllable against unauthorized use. Impersonation of a voice, or similarly distinctive feature, must be granted permission by the original artist for a public impersonation, even for copyrighted materials.
