= Ford SHO V8 engine =

Ford SHO V8

Overview
- Manufacturer: Ford Motor Company and Yamaha Motor Corporation
- Production: 1996–1999

Layout
- Configuration: Naturally aspirated 60° V8
- Displacement: 3.4 L; 207.0 cu in (3,392 cc)
- Cylinder bore: 82.4 mm (3.24 in)
- Piston stroke: 79.5 mm (3.13 in)
- Cylinder block material: Aluminum
- Cylinder head material: Aluminum
- Valvetrain: 32-valve DOHC
- Compression ratio: 10.0:1

Combustion
- Fuel system: Fuel injection
- Fuel type: 93 Octane (Premium)Gasoline
- Cooling system: Water-cooled

Output
- Power output: 235 hp (175 kW) at 6100 rpm
- Torque output: 230 lb⋅ft (312 N⋅m) at 4800 rpm

Chronology
- Predecessor: Duratec 25; SHO V6
- Successor: InTech (FWD V8); Ecoboost V6 Twin-turbo; Volvo B8444S engine (Yamaha)

The Ford Super High Output (SHO) V8 engine was designed and built by Ford Motor Company in conjunction with Yamaha Motor Corporation for use in the 1996 Ford Taurus SHO. It was based on the successful Ford Duratec engine rather than its predecessor, the compact Ford SHO V6 engine developed by Yamaha for the 1989 Taurus SHO. The engine was retired in 1999 when production of the third-generation Taurus SHO ended.

== 3.4 L ==
The 3.4 L SHO V8 was introduced in the spring of 1996. It incorporated many of the traits of the SHO V6, including the aluminum cylinder heads and 4 valves per cylinder DOHC design, but differed with an aluminum rather than iron block and no variable length intake manifold. A chain is also used to time the camshafts to crankshaft instead of the belts that the SHO V6s used. The SHO V8 has a split port style intake valve setup. The primary valve is exposed all the time and has the fuel injector spraying on it, while the secondary valve is only exposed when the Intake manifold Runner Control opens the secondary plates at 3400 rpm. These secondary valves are called "secondaries" by SHO enthusiasts. Power was similar too, at 235 hp (175 kW) and 230 lb⋅ft (312 N⋅m) of torque.

Bore and stroke were identical to the Duratec 25 at 82.4 and 79.5 mm (3.24 and 3.13 in), respectively. The engines shared other traits as well, and insiders report that the designs are related, though not closely. Notably, the two engines share the same bell housing pattern and 60° V angle. The 60° angle makes it compact and more suitable for transverse mounting, but it is not ideally balanced—V8s are typically 90°—necessitating the use of a counter-rotating balance shaft.

Manufacturing was also a shared process. Ford manufactured the aluminum engine blocks, using a patented Cosworth process, at their Windsor, Ontario plant, then shipped them to Japan for finishing by Yamaha. The finished engines were shipped back to the Taurus plant in Atlanta, Georgia for installation.

Unlike the SHO V6, the SHO V8's valvetrain was an "interference" design, one that is shared by many engines built today, meaning that the piston will collide with the valves if the camshaft or timing chain fails. Due to some cam sprocket failures, the engine acquired a reputation for potentially catastrophic failure.

=== Cam trouble ===
Soon after the introduction of the SHO V8 engine, widespread problems with the cam sprockets began to surface. Yamaha had used a relatively unusual method, called "swaging", of affixing the cam sprockets to the camshafts. The cam sprockets were fastened to the hollow camshafts by forcing a metal ball which was slightly larger than the interior diameter of the camshaft through the center of the camshaft, thus expanding the metal slightly and creating a mechanical bond between the cam sprocket and the camshaft.

This method proved to be inadequate, and the cam sprocket could break loose from the camshaft and spin independently from the camshaft (or "walk"). This would result in the camshaft stopping and thus not activating the valves, allowing the pistons to hit the valves, ruining the engine. The preventive measure of welding the cam sprocket to the camshaft soon proved to be a fix for engines that had not suffered such a fate yet. Another such fix is "pinning" the cam sprocket, or inserting a pin in the sprocket to keep it aligned on the camshaft. Ford issued a TSB (TSB 03-14-1) prescribing the application of Loctite to the cam sprocket to lengthen the life of the camshafts, but as SHO owners have experienced cam failure after the application of Loctite, most SHO enthusiasts do not recommend this fix.

== See also ==
- Ford Taurus SHO
- Ford SHO V6 engine
- List of Ford engines
- List of Ford bellhousing patterns
