= Ford AXOD transmission =

AXOD

Overview
- Manufacturer: Ford Motor Company
- Also called: AXOD-E; AX4N; AX4S; 4F50N
- Production: 1986–2007

Body and chassis
- Class: 4-speed transverse automatic transaxle

Chronology
- Successor: 6F

The AXOD was a 4-speed automatic transaxle for transverse front wheel drive automobiles from the Ford Motor Company. It was introduced in the 1986 Ford Taurus/Mercury Sable (with the 3.0 L Vulcan V6). The AXOD and its successors are built in Ford's Van Dyke Transmission plant in Sterling Heights, Michigan. Production of the final member of the family, the 4F50N (a renaming of the AX4N), ended in November 2006.

The AXOD has a code letter of "T" on its data plate. The AXOD transaxle has 17 bolts to retain its fluid pan.

Applications:

- 1986–1990 Ford Taurus
- 1986–1990 Mercury Sable
- 1988–1991 Lincoln Continental

== AXOD-E ==
The AXOD was updated with electronic controls in 1991 as the AXOD-E. The electronic shifting and torque converter controls were integrated with the Taurus's electronic control module for smoother shifts.

This had a data plate code of "T" for 1991 and 1992 models.

Applications:

- 1991–1992 Ford Taurus
- 1991–1992 Mercury Sable
- 1991–1992 Lincoln Continental

== AX4S ==
The AXOD-E was renamed AX4S in 1993. In addition to the name change, improvements in the lubrication of the gearset and capacity upgrades were made. A centrifugal piston assembly was implemented in the intermediate clutch position to improve 1st–2nd and 2nd–1st shift quality and an increase in the clutch's durability was made on some models. High energy friction materials were also introduced. A new twin piston torque converter clutch (TCC) was introduced with the AX4S and the AX4N on some models. The transaxle pan on this model will sometimes read "AXOD Metric" since it is based on the AXOD transaxle. The data plate code for this transmission is "L."

Applications:

- 1993–1994 Lincoln Continental
- 1993–2003 Ford Taurus
- 1993–2003 Mercury Sable
- 1995–2000 Ford Windstar

== AX4N/4F50N ==
The AX4N is an improved version of the basic AXOD, and is more reliable. This transaxle shifting is non-synchronous (as indicated by the "N" in AX4N) and has improved shift quality over the previous AX4S. Although similar in design and dimensions, it is a different transaxle than previous AXOD transmissions. The AX4N has 19 bolts to retain the fluid pan. It was used in the 1996–99 Taurus SHO models, and was standard on Duratec-powered models. It also appears in some 1994–2002 Vulcan-powered models. It became standard with both engines in 2003. It was renamed the 4F50N in 2001. The data plate code is "X."

Applications:

- 1996–1999 Ford Taurus SHO
- 1994–2007 Ford Taurus
- 1995–2002 Lincoln Continental
- 1994–2005 Mercury Sable
- 2001–2003 Ford Windstar
- 2004–2007 Ford Freestar
- 2004–2007 Mercury Monterey

== Reliability issues ==
Earlier AXOD and AXOD-E models have a poor reliability record due to internal lubrication problems. These were mostly remedied by 1995. These transaxles require fluid and filter changes every 30,000 miles to maximize service life.

Intermediate clutch failures resulting in poor 1–2 shifts or slipping are common on all AX family members.

Failure of the "Neutral to Drive Accumulator" causes hard shifts into a drive gear (R, OD, D, 1) from "N" or "P". This can become quite violent. Reasons for this part's failure: Piston stuck, or seals or springs damaged or missing. Correction for this problem: Check these parts for damage. Replace as required (located inside the transaxle, recommended that a transmission shop do the repair, but a full rebuild of the transaxle is NOT required). In general, however, difficulty shifting from neutral to overdrive, OD to N, N to R, and R to N is most likely caused by a stretched shifter cable.

Other issues such as locking and/or breaking the parking "pawl" occurs in these transmissions primarily due to owner negligence in not operating the parking brake properly, or not using the parking brake at all. If the vehicle is allowed to "roll back" onto the pawl with heavy force (such as when parking on a steep incline), the pawl may break off or seize the gears so that either the vehicle rolls away, or when the owner starts the vehicle and attempts to put the vehicle in gear, they are unable to move the shift lever from Park. This creates a compound issue in which the shifter linkage or cable can break due to excess force. The vehicle's owner guide states the appropriate procedure is to engage the parking brake before shifting to Park, rather than relying on the pawl, as the pawl is a last line of defense to prevent the vehicle from moving unintentionally. If the parking pawl breaks off or bends, serious transaxle damage can occur.

In the mid-2000’s, NHTSA launched an investigation into the Ford Freestar and Mercury Monterey due to numerous complaints with regard to the equipped 4F50N transmission. Although the investigation is centered on the Torque Converter, these failures often require that the entire transaxle be rebuilt or replaced.

== See also ==
- List of Ford transmissions
