= Bell housing =

Connects a vehicle transmission to the engine

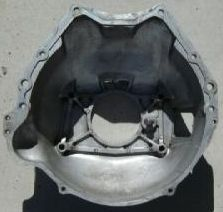
A bare Buick, Olds, Pontiac pattern bellhousing viewed from the engine end

Bellhousing (also "bell-housing" or simply "bell") is a colloquial term for the component that aligns and connects the transmission of a vehicle to its engine, and which covers and protects the flywheel/clutch or flexplate/torque converter. It derives its name from the bell-like shape that those internal components necessitate. It may also support clutch and/or shifter linkage. Starters were typically mounted to the bellhousing until manufacturers moved them to the engine block (beginning 1964 for GM). Prior to the 1960s, longitudinal powertrains typically used the "Tricycle" frame-mount layout (described below), and their bellhousings typically contained the two rear powertrain mounts.

A bellhousing may be a separate housing bolted to the gearbox, or it may be an integral portion of the transmission housing, particularly with front wheel drive and automatic transmissions. An integral bell has a front bolt pattern that matches the engine to which it will be paired, and a divorced bell additionally has a rear bolt pattern that matches the gearbox to which it will be paired. Different bellhousings allow a transmission design to attach to multiple engine designs.

Some early "Extended" engine blocks were cast with integral "upper-half" bells, but most blocks had a flat mounting surface.

Longitudinal Powertrains (engine & transmission) are typically mounted to vehicle frames at 3-points (like a tripod), using one of two layouts:

- Early "Tricycle" 1-2 layout: one front mount located at block's "chin", plus 2 rear mounts on the bell sides. The entire gearbox suspends freely off the back of the bell
- Modern "Taildragger" 2-1 layout: two front mounts located on block midsides, plus one rear mount under the transmission tailhousing that supports gearbox weight

== See also ==
- List of auto parts
- List of Ford bellhousing patterns
- List of GM bellhousing patterns
