= Ford HSC engine =

4-cylinder Ford automobile engine (1984–1994)

Ford High Swirl Combustion (HSC)
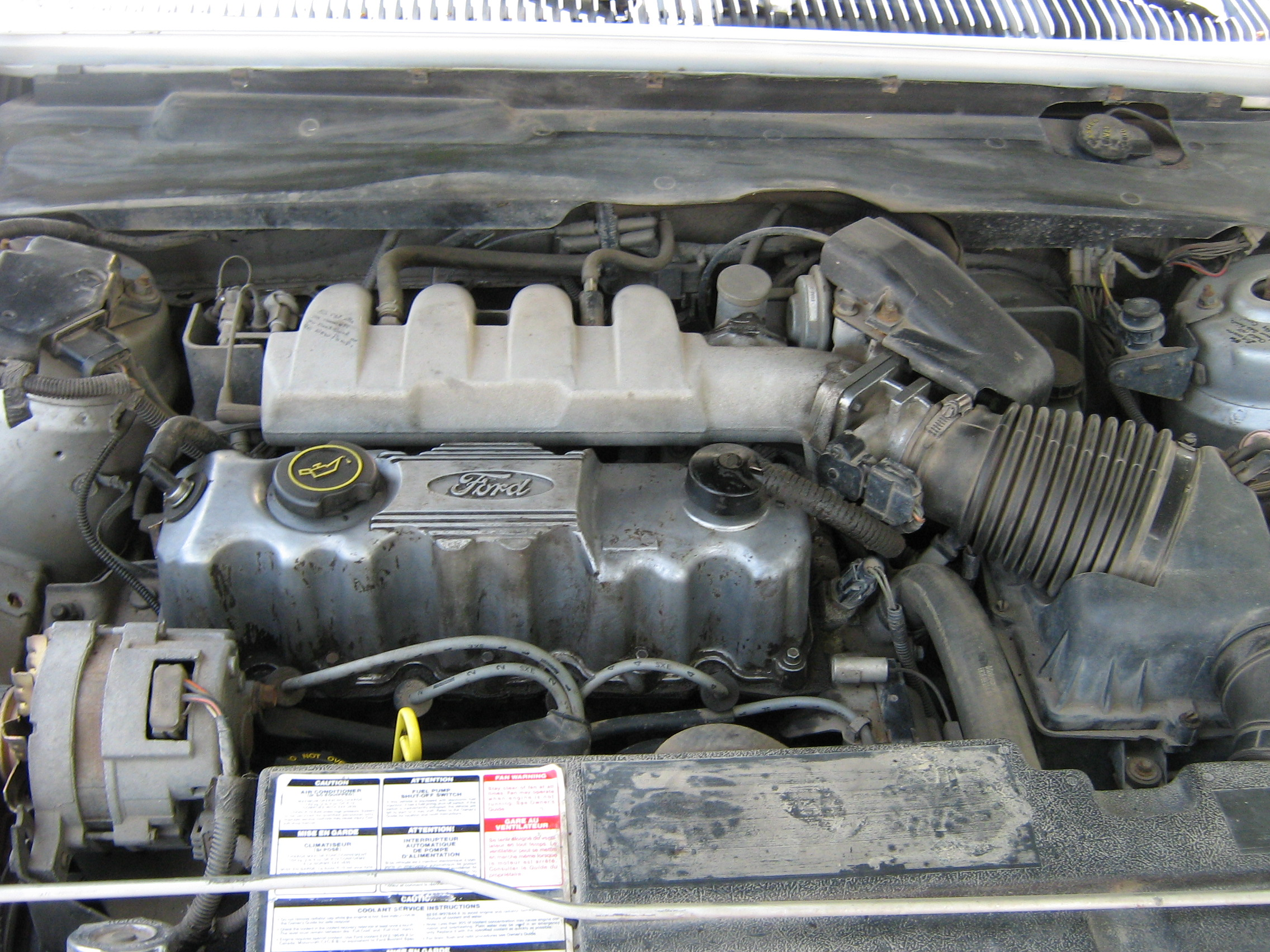

Overview
- Manufacturer: Ford Motor Company
- Production: 1984 – 1994

Layout
- Configuration: Inline-four
- Displacement: 2.3 L (2,301 cc; 140.4 cu in); 2.5 L (2,497 cc; 152.4 cu in)
- Cylinder bore: 93.5 mm (3.68 in)
- Piston stroke: 83.8 mm (3.30 in); 90.9 mm (3.58 in)
- Cylinder block material: Cast iron
- Cylinder head material: Cast iron
- Valvetrain: OHV 8 valves

Combustion
- Fuel system: Holley 6149 carburetor; CFI (1985–1987); MPFI (1988–1990); SEFI (1991–1994)
- Fuel type: Unleaded gasoline
- Oil system: Wet sump
- Cooling system: Water-cooled

Output
- Power output: 86–105 hp (64–78 kW)
- Torque output: 125–140 lb⋅ft (169–190 N⋅m)

The Ford HSC engine is an automobile gasoline engine from the Ford Motor Company, sold from 1984 until 1994. HSC stands for High Swirl Combustion. It was made in two displacements: 2.3 L and 2.5 L, and used in only two model lines: the Ford Tempo/Mercury Topaz and the Ford Taurus/Mercury Sable.

== Development ==
In the late 1970s Ford began planning a new smaller front wheel drive (FWD) compact car that became the Ford Tempo. The Tempo was designed to use a four-cylinder engine, but all production of Ford's 2.3 L Lima OHC four was committed to other product lines. At the same time, the 1983 end of life of Ford's 200 cubic inch Thriftpower Six inline six left unused capacity at the Lima Engine plant. Ford developed a four-cylinder engine that shared some features of the Thriftpower six, topped with a new cylinder head and using other new technologies, while repurposing as much tooling as possible at the Lima plant. To maximize use of existing tooling the new engine shared spindle spacing where possible with the Thriftpower six, resulting in similar cylinder, crankshaft, and tappet bores, as well as crankshaft journal diameters.

Reliability and durability were key design goals for the engine. It was designed for use with an automatic transmission, and was optimized to deliver most of its power at low engine speeds. Extensive efforts were made to reduce losses due to valvetrain friction.

To accelerate development of the combustion chamber shape, a test engine was created using an engine block from a 1980 model year 3.3 L (200 cu in) Thriftpower six that was cut, shortened, and brazed together again, resulting in a four-cylinder engine displacing 2.2 L (134 cu in). Since the Tempo's front chassis member spacing was the same as the first generation North American Ford Escort, the engine's transverse package length had to be minimized, which was done by reducing the deck length between the end cylinder bores and ends of the block.

Camshafts, crankshafts, and connecting rods for the engine were produced at Ford's Cleveland Engine Plant #2. Engine assembly took place at Ford's Lima plant, suitably upgraded. A new state-of-the-art engine assembly line was built at Ford's Chihuahua Engine facility in Chihuahua, Mexico.

When the Tempo was released, a turbocharged version of its new engine was said to be in development, but this configuration never became available.

== Features ==
The HSC engine has a cast iron block and head, with a single cam-in-block and two overhead valves (OHV) per cylinder with pushrods and rocker arms.

The cylinder head is a reverse flow design that puts the intake and exhaust ports on the same side of the head. For heat control, the exhaust was mounted on the firewall side of the engine, along with the intake. This left the spark plugs, distributor, fuel pump, oil filter and starter on the front side of the engine, for ease of servicing.

The engine's name derives from it being the first "fastburn" engine offered by Ford. The definition of fastburn in the HSC is that 90% of the intake charge is burned within 15° of crankshaft rotation. To accomplish this, Ford put the spark plug in the center of the combustion chamber to minimize flame-propagation distance, and partially shrouded the intake valves, which accelerated and swirled the intake charge to more quickly fill the combustion chamber. These features were borrowed from Ford's programmed combustion (PROCO) engine research project.

To reduce weight the intake manifold, water pump, and front cover are aluminum. A die-cast aluminum sump stiffens the entire engine assembly to reduce noise, vibration, and harshness (NVH).

For its first year of production all HSCs used a carburetor. Later model year changes added a series of progressively more sophisticated fuel injection systems. All versions of the HSC engine, including the carbureted ones, are managed by Ford's EEC-IV engine control unit (ECU). This model controller added Keep Alive Memory (KAM), which enabled the engine to use adaptive control and self-diagnostics.

From 1985 to 1992 the HSC engine was available in a "High Specific Output" (HSO) version producing 100 hp (75 kW) and 125 lb⋅ft (169 N⋅m), compared to the regular 1985 version's 86 hp (64 kW) and 124 lb⋅ft (168 N⋅m). To increase power Ford enlarged the ports, reshaped both the ports and combustion chambers, and unshrouded the valves. A camshaft with higher lift and longer duration was added. The intake manifold received larger runners and the air cleaner and exhaust system were redesigned to improve flow. The HSO engine is denoted by an "S" in the VIN.

Ford had used the descriptive term "high swirl combustion" many years earlier in a company publication, describing the design of its new Lincoln Y-block V8 engine: "The new 'Hi-Swirl' combustion chamber provides a more thorough mixing of the fuel and a more complete and even burning."

== 2.3 L ==
The 2.3 L HSC was introduced in 1984 in the Ford Tempo and Mercury Topaz. Bore and stroke are 93.47 mm × 83.82 mm (3.68 in × 3.3 in), for a total displacement of 2.3 L (2,301 cc; 140.4 cu in). This engine produced 90 hp (67 kW) and 125 lb⋅ft (169 N⋅m) of torque.

For 1984 HSC engines for US 50 state cars were fitted with a 1-barrel Holley 6149 carburetor, while cars for Canada received a non-feedback Holley Model 1949. In 1985 American-market engines received Central Fuel Injection (CFI), which reduced power to 86 hp (64 kW). Ford addressed the power decrease in the base engine by releasing the HSO version for performance-oriented variants of the Tempo (GLS) and Topaz (LTS/XR5). A switch to multi-port fuel injection in 1988 raised horsepower to 95 hp (71 kW). Sequential fuel injection was added for 1992, increasing horsepower to 98 hp (73 kW). That same year the HSO variant was dropped, as the sportier versions of the Tempo/Topaz received the 3.0 L Vulcan as standard equipment.

Applications:

- 1984–1994 Ford Tempo
- 1984–1994 Mercury Topaz

== 2.5 L ==
A 2.5 L HSC version appeared in 1986. Its 2.5 L (2,497 cc; 152.4 cu in) displacement resulted from its longer 91.01 mm (3.583 in) stroke. The engine block's deck height was raised to 9.4 in (239 mm) from the 8.7 in (221 mm) of the 2.3 L. The extra displacement was deemed necessary for it to serve as a four-cylinder engine option for fleet customers of the new Ford Taurus. This engine used the head and camshaft from the HSO engine and produced 90 hp (67 kW) and 130 lb⋅ft (176 N⋅m). It sold in low volumes (less than 15% of the HSC engines built) and was costly due to the tooling changeover required for the taller deck height. The earliest 2.5 L came standard with electronic multi-port fuel injection. It received sequential fuel injection in 1991, raising output to 105 hp (78 kW) and 140 lb⋅ft (190 N⋅m) of torque.

Applications:

- 1986–1991 Ford Taurus
- 1986 Mercury Sable

== See also ==
- List of Ford engines
