= Edison Assembly =

Defunct automobile manufacturing plant

- Operated: 1948–2004
- Location: 939 U.S. Route 1; Edison, New Jersey, United States
- Coordinates: 40°31′01″N 74°22′19″W
- Industry: Automotive
- Products: Automobiles
- Employees: 750 (2004)
- Area: 100 acres (0.40 km^{2})
- Volume: 1,430,000 square feet (133,000 m^{2})
- Owner: Ford Motor Company

Edison Assembly, also known as Metuchen Assembly, was a Ford Motor Company manufacturing plant in Edison, New Jersey, United States. It was located at 939 U.S. Route 1 and occupied over 100 acres when it was open. The factory began operations in 1948 and was closed in 2004. Several popular Ford products were manufactured there, such as the Ford Mustang, Ford Ranger, and the Ford Pinto. When the plant opened, it manufactured the new Mercury branded and Lincoln vehicles. It was one of three Ford manufacturing facilities in New Jersey and was built two years before the Mahwah Assembly plant was opened in 1950.

The plant produced 6.9 million vehicles in total; switching to compact car assembly in the 1960s, it built the Ford Falcon and Mustang and the related Mercury Comet, and then to subcompact cars in 1972 with the Ford Pinto and Mercury Bobcat and later their Escort and Lynx successors.

== History ==
It was one of only three locations where Ford manufactured the first generation Mustang; the other sites were Dearborn Assembly in Dearborn, Michigan and Milpitas Assembly in San Jose, California.

In 1990, production shifted to Ranger pickups, and produced 1.7 million Rangers along with the related Mazda B-Series.

In December 2001, Ford began laying off employees and eliminating one of two shifts at the plant due to declining sales of the Ranger pickup and the September 11 attacks, roughly 600 hourly and 30 salaried workers lost their jobs effective February 2002.

=== Closure ===
On January 11, 2002, it was announced that the Edison Assembly Plant would be closed by 2004, along with the St. Louis Assembly Plant in Hazelwood, Missouri, the Ontario Truck Plant in Oakville, Ontario, the Cleveland Aluminum Casting Plant in Brook Park, Ohio, and the Vulcan Forge Plant in Dearborn, Michigan. Production was ceased on February 27, 2004 after 56 years of operation.

As of 2019, the site is occupied by a Sam's Club, Topgolf, Supercharged Entertainment and various restaurants.

== Products ==
- Ford Escort
- Ford Falcon
- Ford Mustang
- Ford Pinto
- Ford Ranger (1990–2004)
- Mercury Bobcat
- Mercury Cougar
- Mercury Lynx
- Mercury Custom
- Mercury Monterey
- Mercury Montclair
- Mercury Park Lane
- Mercury Station Wagons

== See also ==
- List of Ford factories
