= Mazda G5M transmission =

Mazda Motor Corporation (Japanese: マツダ株式会社, Hepburn: Matsuda Kabushiki-gaisha) is a Japanese multinational automaker based in Fuchū, Hiroshima, Japan.

== Gearsets ==
The Mazda G5M five speed manual transaxle came in several gearsets:

| Transmission | Usage | First gear | Second gear | Third gear | Fourth gear | Fifth gear |
|---|---|---|---|---|---|---|
| G5M | 98-99 Ford Escort ZX2 and Ford Probe 2.5L | 3.307 | 1.833 | 1.311 | 1.030 | 0.795 |
| G5M | Ford Escort GT and Ford Probe 2.0L | 3.307 | 1.833 | 1.233 | 0.914 | 0.717 |
| G5M | 99.5-2003 Ford Escort ZX2 | 3.310 | 1.830 | 1.310 | 0.970 | 0.750 |
| G5M-R | 01-04 Ford Escape/Mazda Tribute | 3.666 | 2.059 | 1.310 | 1.030 | 0.837 |
| G5M-R | 91-92 Mazda MX-3 | 3.307 | 1.833 | 1.311 | 1.030 | 0.795 |

== See also ==
- List of Mazda transmissions
