= Ford Escort (North America) =

Car model

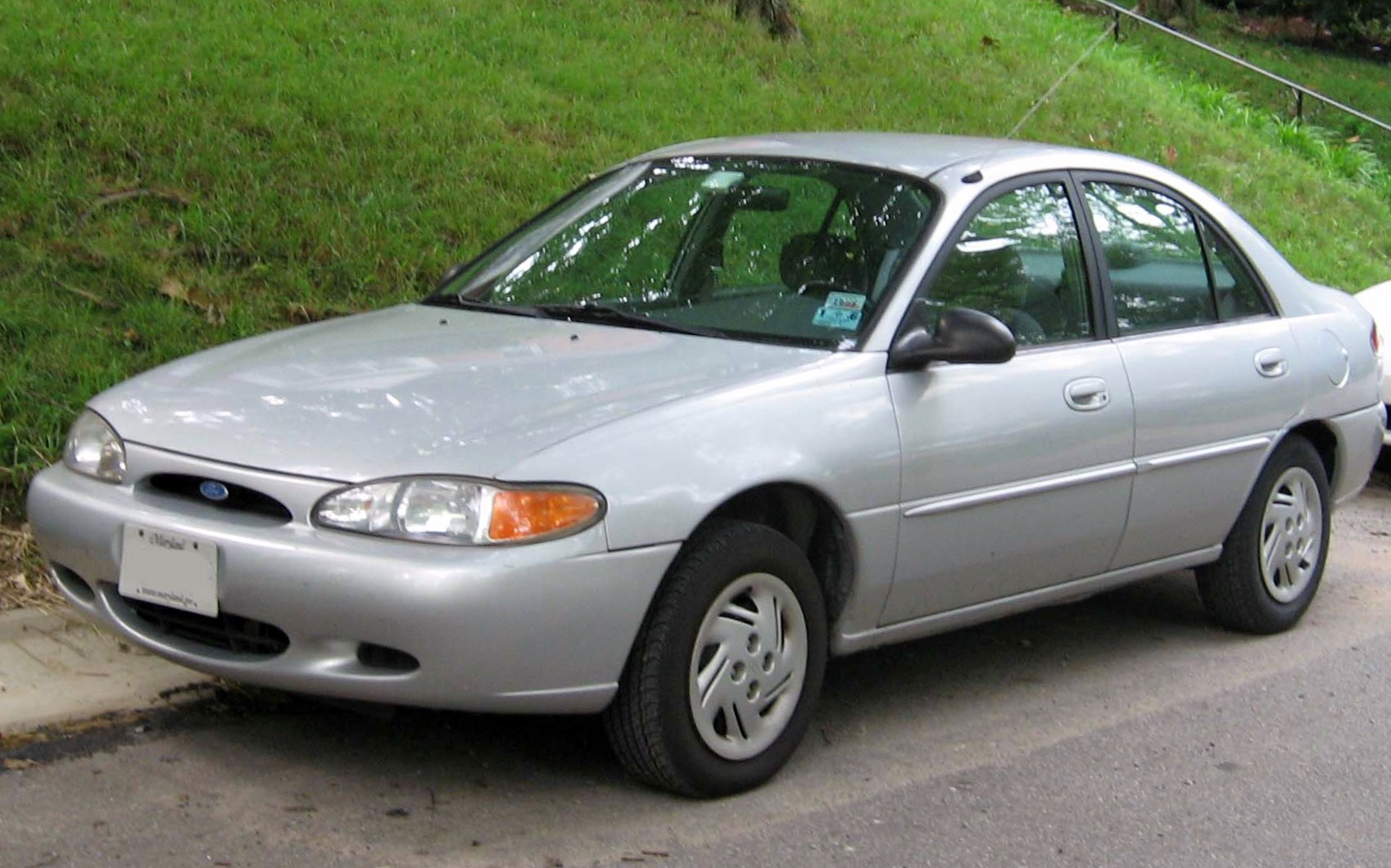

Overview
- Manufacturer: Ford Motor Company
- Production: 1980–2003

Body and chassis
- Class: Compact car
- Layout: FF layout

Chronology
- Predecessor: Ford Pinto / Mercury Bobcat; Ford Fiesta (1978–1980) (North America)
- Successor: Ford Focus

The North American version of the Ford Escort is a range of cars that were sold by Ford from the 1981 to 2003 model years. The direct successor of the Ford Pinto, the Escort also largely overtook the role of the European-imported Ford Fiesta as the smallest vehicle in the Ford model line in North America. Produced across three generations, the first generation was a subcompact car; the latter two generations were compact cars. Becoming highly successful in the marketplace, the Escort became the best-selling car in the United States after 1982, a position it would hold for much of the 1980s.

Produced across three generations, the Escort was the first world car developed by Ford, with the first-generation American Escort designed alongside Ford of Europe, who transitioned the Escort Mk III to front-wheel drive. During its production, the Escort also underwent a wide use of platform sharing and rebranding. The first generation served as the basis of the longer-wheelbase Ford Tempo/Mercury Topaz, the two-seat Ford EXP/Mercury LN7 and was rebranded as the Mercury Lynx. The second generation was introduced for 1991, growing into the compact segment. Moving away from a shared design with Ford of Europe, the Escort now shared a platform with the Mazda 323 and sharing a body with the Ford Laser (a model line sold in Asia and Oceania); the Mercury Lynx was replaced by the Mercury Tracer. For 1997, the third generation served as an extensive redesign of the previous-generation sedan; the Escort ZX2 two-door was introduced, with the Mercury Tracer adopting a similar redesign.

Ford introduced the Ford Focus in North America for 2000 as its third "world car", phasing it in as the successor of the Escort. After 2000, the four-door Escort was moved primarily to fleet sales (with the coupe remaining available); production ended entirely after the 2002 model year. In contrast to the first-generation American Escort and Escort Mk III of Ford of Europe (and the Mondeo/Contour and Mercury Mystique), the Focus adopted a much larger degree of commonality between its European and North American variants, in effect, becoming the original world car Ford had originally envisioned with the Escort.

During its entire production, the Escort was produced by Wayne Stamping & Assembly in (Wayne, Michigan) and the first generation was also produced by Edison Assembly in (Edison, New Jersey), San Jose Assembly Plant in (Milpitas, California), and Oakville Assembly in (Oakville, Ontario, Canada) while the second and third generations were also produced by Hermosillo Stamping and Assembly in (Hermosillo, Sonora, Mexico).

== Ford "world car" ==
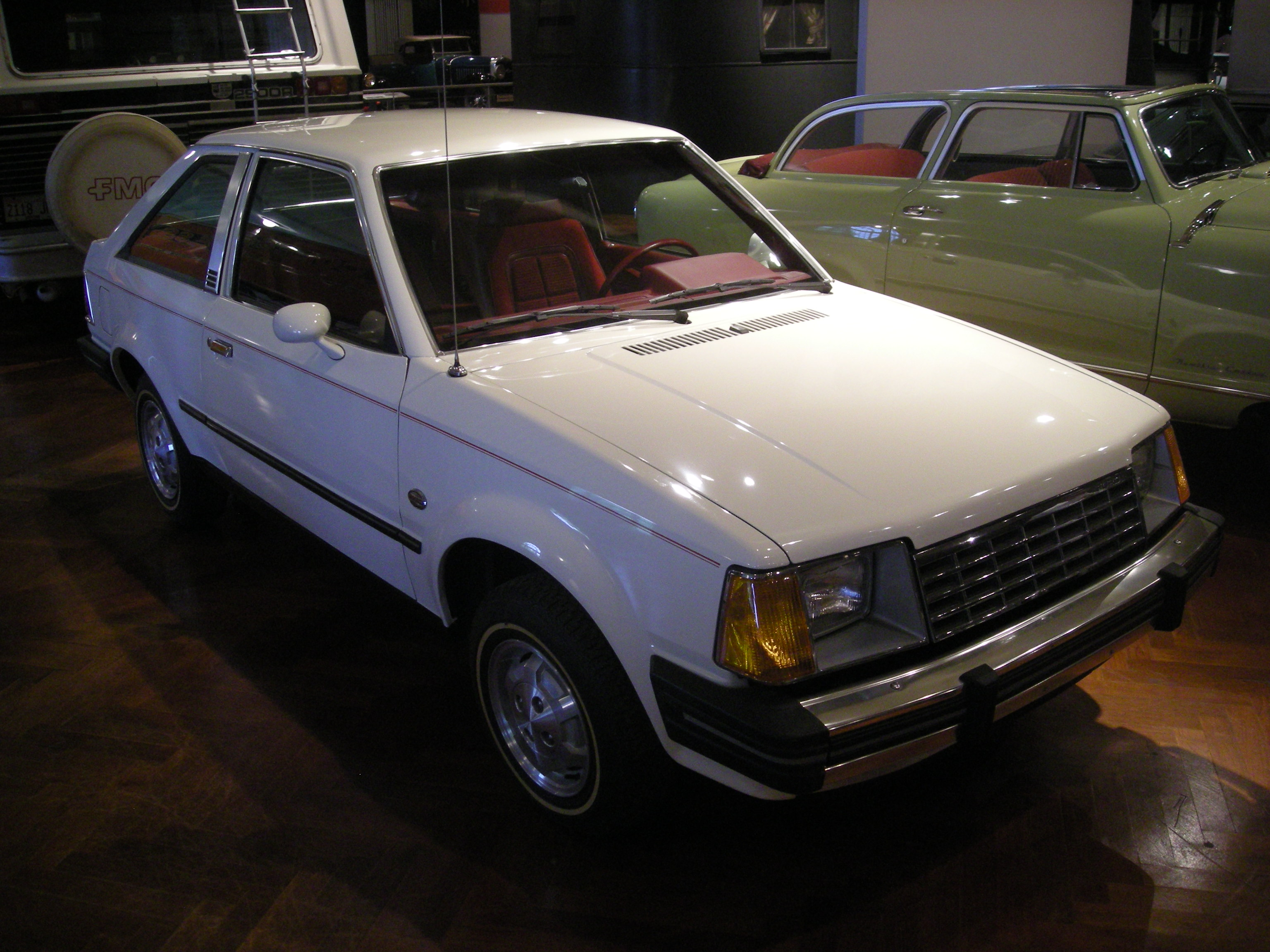
American version: 1981 Ford Escort GLX (on display at The Henry Ford)

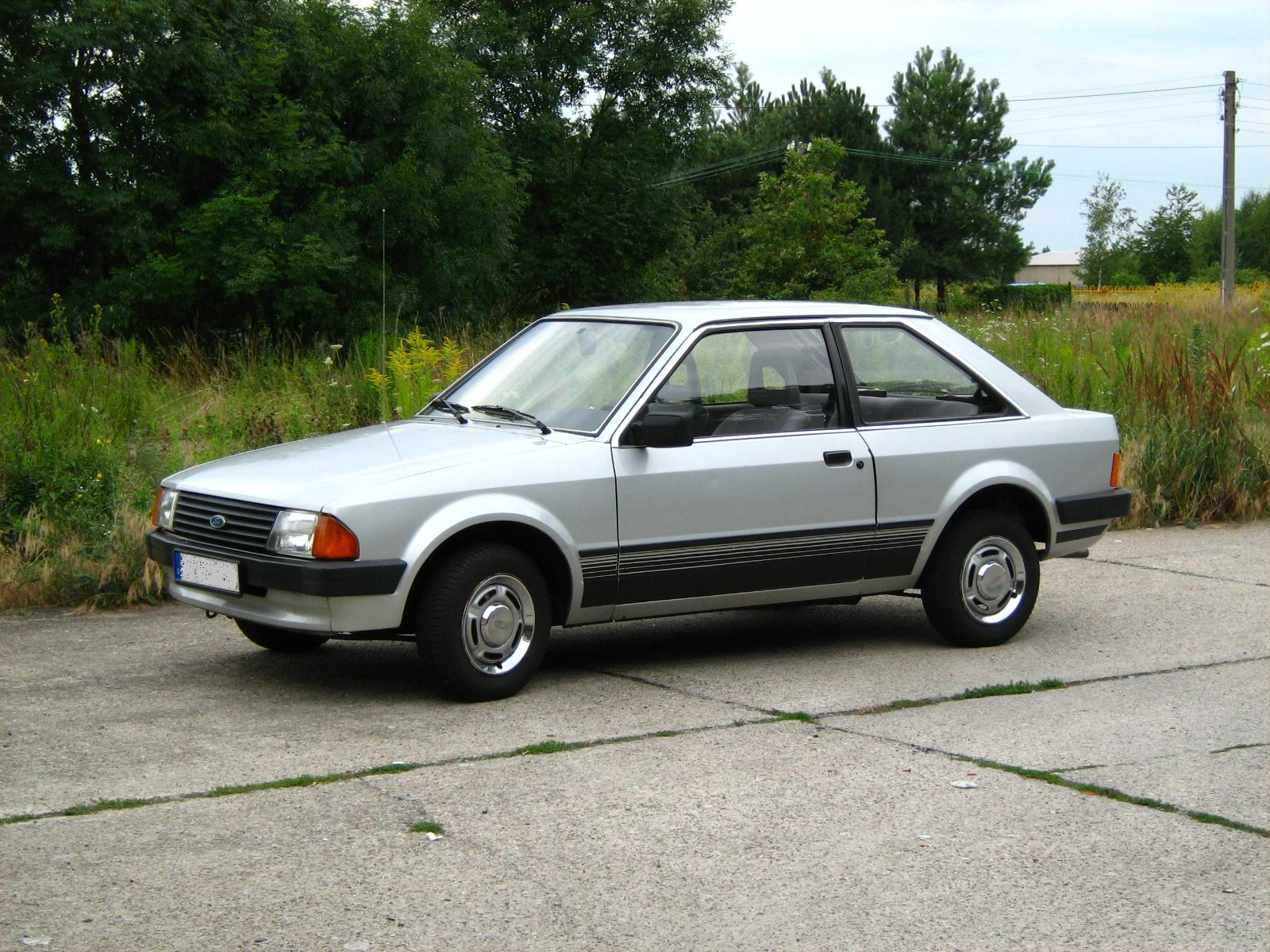
European version: 1981 Ford Escort Mk III 1.3L

The North American Ford Escort began as an intended "world car" project by Ford in North America and Ford of Europe, which had sold cars branded "Ford Escort" since 1968. Ford had already tried to market some of its European models in the North American market, including the Capri and the Mk I Fiesta, but these were single products conceived from the beginning to cater for both markets, not world cars. Following the success of the smaller Fiesta, the new vehicle was to adopt a front-wheel drive powertrain.

The program intended to consolidate the replacements for the North American Ford Pinto and the European Ford Escort Mk II under a single model architecture. Intended for a 1981 model launch, the original intent was for the American Escort and the European Mk III Escort to share a common chassis architecture and components. During model development, American and European design teams diverged in thinking, leading to extensive differences in the final product lines.

Though they share the same basic shape, the 1981 Ford Escort and Escort Mk III share no interchangeable body parts; the only common components between the two vehicles are the CVH inline-4 engine and the ATX automatic transmission. The suspension is the same basic design between both cars, but again the components are not interchangeable. While sharing a common 94.2 inch wheelbase, the American Escort is longer and wider than the European version; most versions are fitted with a larger amount of chrome exterior trim typical of American vehicles of the period, and the altered proportions gave the car a heavier and more ungainly appearance than its European sister. In Europe, the Escort was produced in three body styles never developed for North America, including a 3-door station wagon, 2-door convertible, and a 2-door van. The European version also had a 4-door sedan derivative marketed separately under the Orion nameplate.

== First generation (1981–1990) ==
First generation
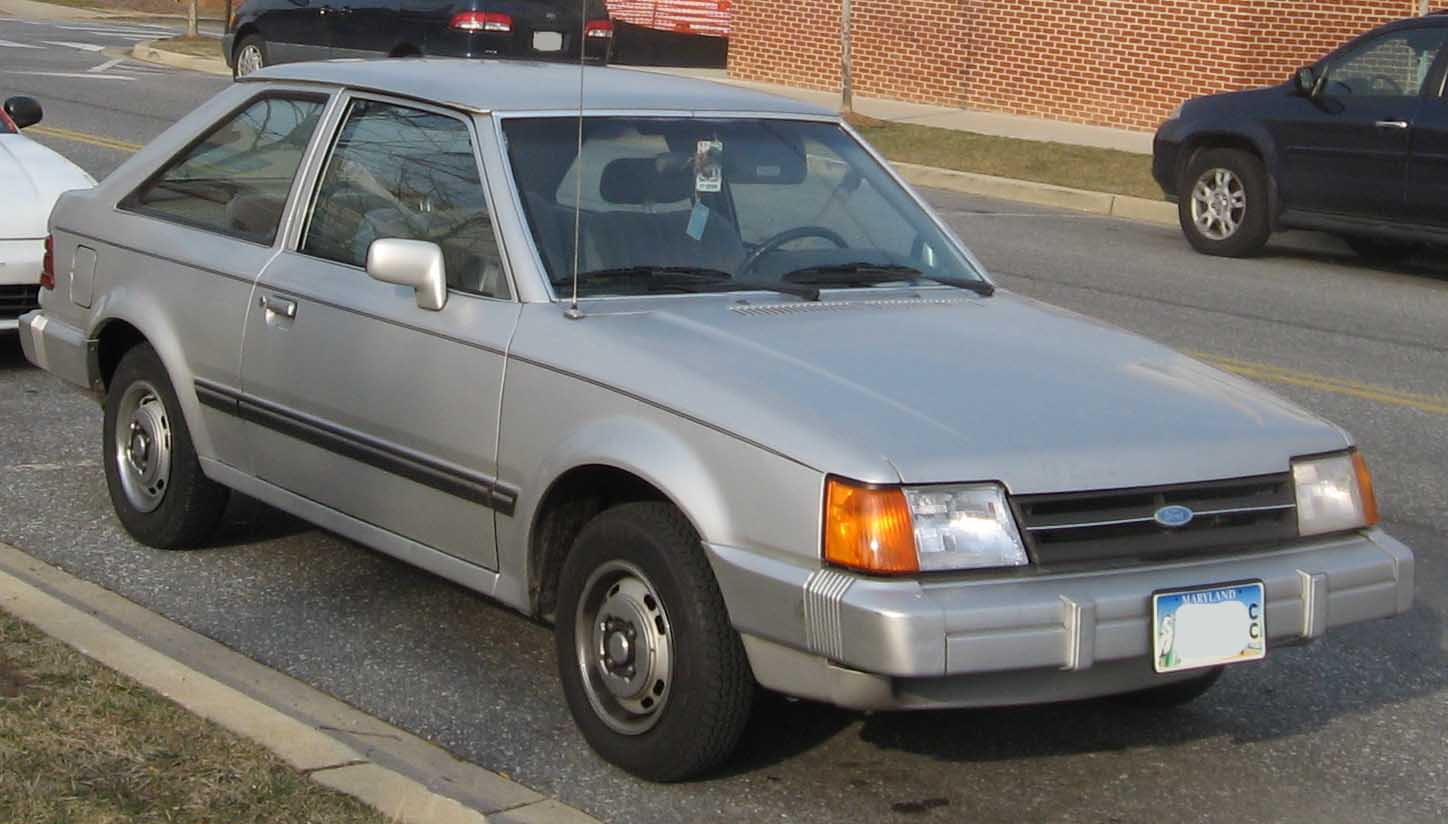

Overview
- Also called: Mercury Lynx
- Production: 1980–1990 (Escort); 1980–1987 (Lynx)
- Model years: 1981–1990 (Escort); 1981–1987 (Lynx)
- Assembly: United States: Edison, New Jersey (Edison Assembly); United States: Milpitas, California (San Jose Assembly Plant); United States: Wayne, Michigan (Wayne Stamping & Assembly); Canada: Oakville, Ontario (Oakville Assembly)

Body and chassis
- Body style: 3/5-door hatchback; 5-door station wagon
- Platform: Ford CE14 platform
- Related: Ford EXP / Mercury LN7; Ford Tempo / Mercury Topaz; Ford Escort (Europe); Ford Orion

Powertrain
- Engine: 1.6 L CVH I4; 1.9 L CVH I4; 2.0 L Mazda RF diesel I4
- Transmission: 4-speed MTX-II manual; 5-speed MTX-III manual; 3-speed ATX/FLC automatic

Dimensions
- Wheelbase: 94.2 in (2,393 mm)
- Length: 169.4 in (4,303 mm); GT: 169.0 in (4,293 mm)
- Width: 65.9 in (1,674 mm)
- Height: Hatchback: 53.7 in (1,364 mm); Sedan: 53.4 in (1,356 mm)
- Curb weight: 2,243 lb (1,017 kg) (Escort GT)

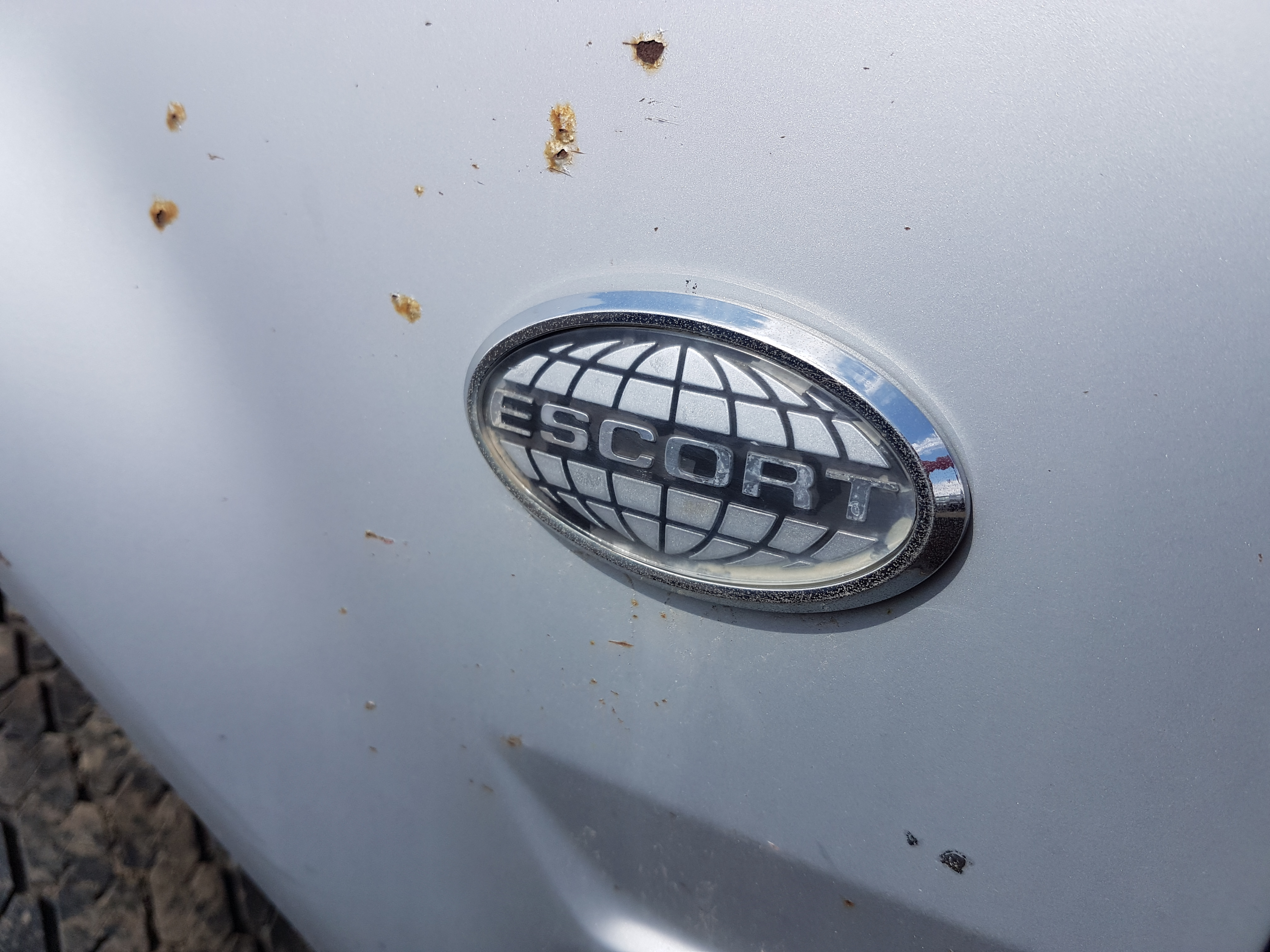
1981 Ford Escort "World Car" badge

The first-generation Ford Escort was launched on October 3, 1980, for the 1981 model year, with Lincoln-Mercury marketing the model line as the Mercury Lynx. Sharing a nearly identical wheelbase with the Pinto, the Escort grew in size over its predecessor, nearly six inches longer and over three inches taller, featuring front-wheel drive and a transverse-mounted engine. Alongside an unnamed base trim, the Escort was marketed in L, GL, GLX, and SS trim levels.

=== 1981–1984 ===
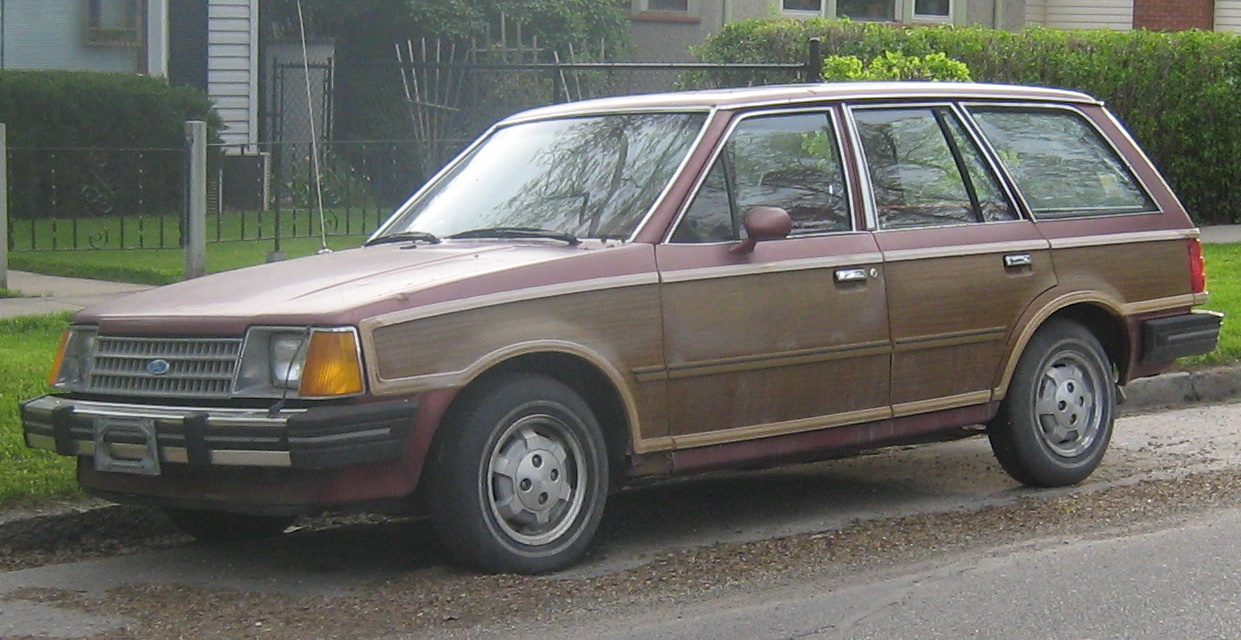
1982–1985 Ford Escort GL Squire

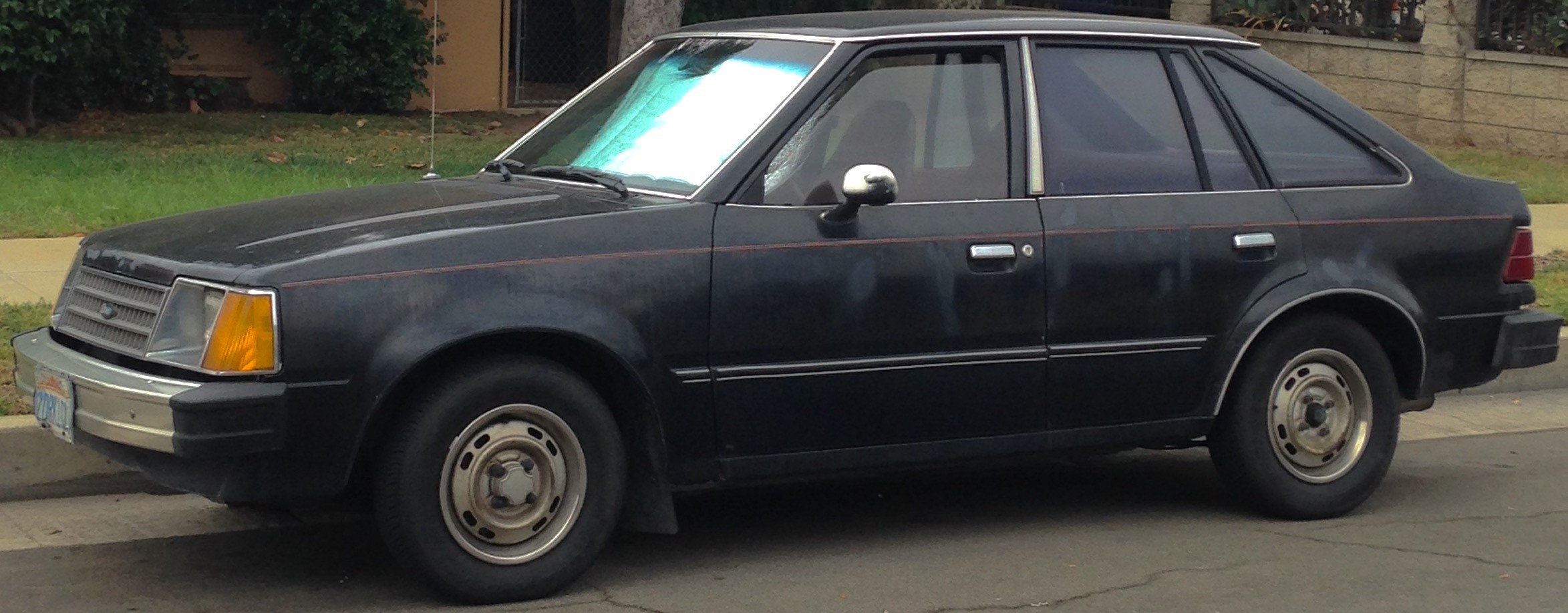
1982–1985 Ford Escort GL 5-door

For 1981, the Escort was initially introduced with three-door hatchback and five-door station wagon body styles; a five-door hatchback was introduced in May 1981. To showcase its "world car" status, Ford designed an Escort badge for the front fenders including a globe representing the earth; this badge was used for 1981 only. In line with the larger Fairmont and LTD Crown Victoria station wagons, the Escort wagon was offered with an imitation woodgrain Squire package in the GL and GLX trims.

For 1982, the exterior received a minor revision, as the model badging was revised to reflect the adoption of the Ford Blue Oval emblem on the North American product lines. Along with an updated grille, the blue oval also replaced the previous "FORD" lettering on the liftgate. The "SS" package was also available during 1981; this included blacked-out trim, a special stripe and decal package, upgraded brakes, and wider tires but no additional power. The SS package was replaced with the (more powerful) Escort GT the following year due to an interaction with General Motors' Chevrolet SS option package. The Ford EXP was introduced as a two-seat hatchback coupe (see below). Starting at a price of $5,518, the 1982 Escort became the best-selling Ford model line and the best-selling automobile nameplate in the United States.

For 1983, the exterior was largely carryover, with most changes concentrated to the Escort GT and the EXP. For liftback/wagon Escorts, the unnamed base model was dropped, leaving the L trim as standard.

For 1984, the trim levels were revised further, as the GLX was dropped and replaced with a fuel-injected LX model. Offered for the five-door hatchback or wagon, the LX was fitted with the fuel-injected engine of the GT, along with its blackout trim and styled cast-aluminum wheels. The interior of the Escort was revised, introducing a new dashboard and new rubber shift boots for manual transmissions; automatic models received new gear selector levers with straight lines for gear selection instead of the twisting "question mark" pattern of the previous models. In line with other Fords, activation of the horn was moved from the turn signal stalk to the steering wheel.

=== 1985–1990 ===
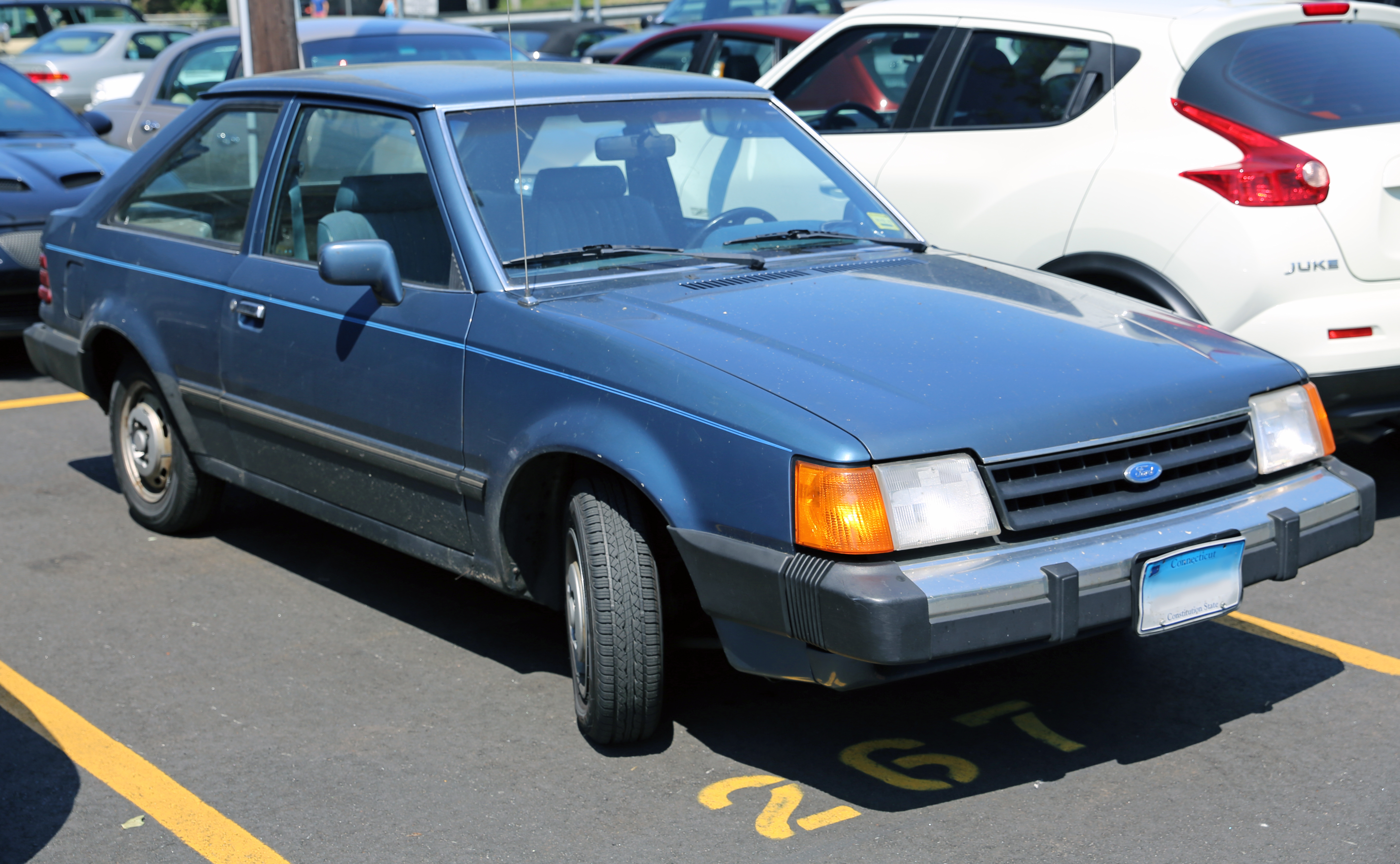
1986 Ford Escort L

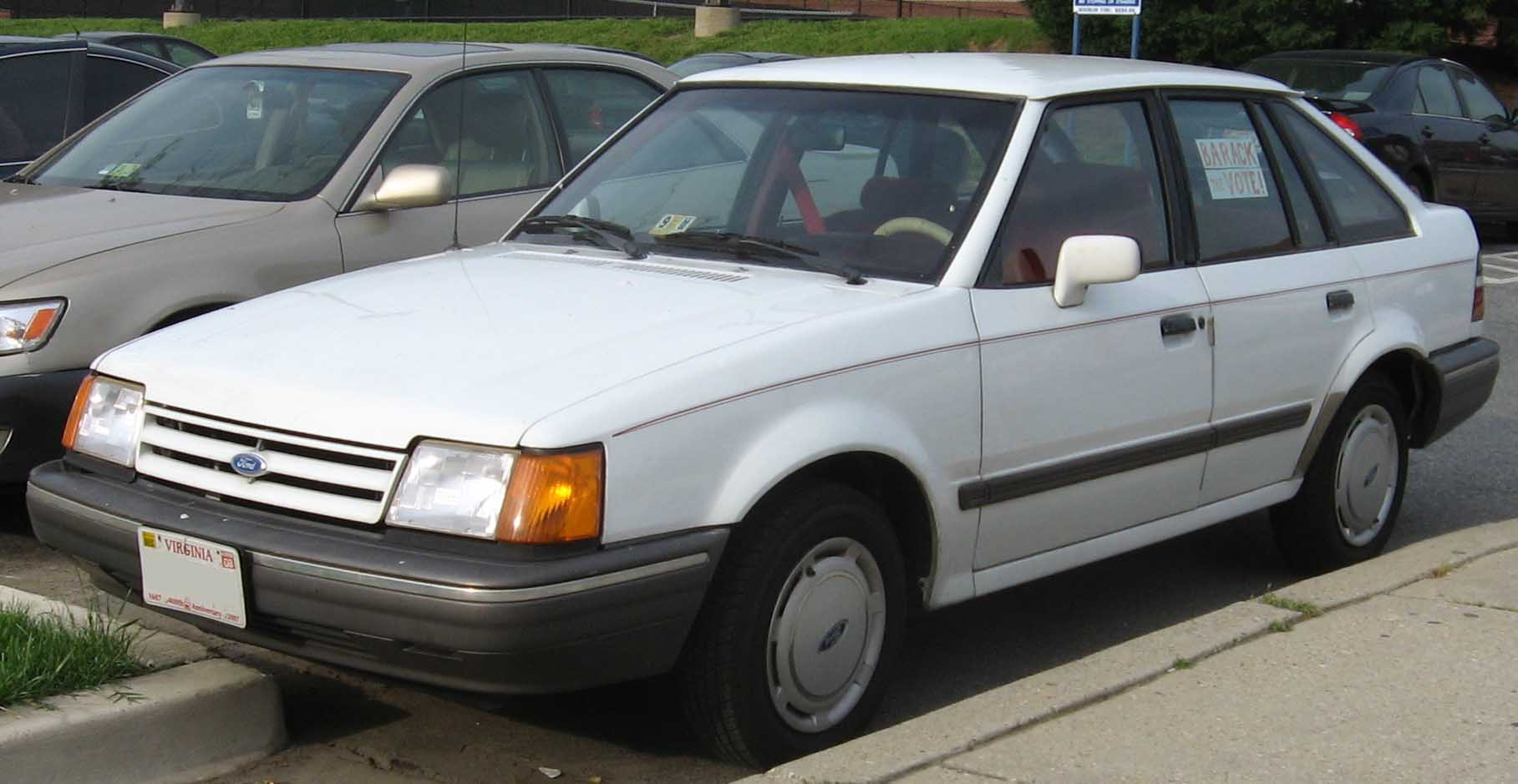
1989–1990 Ford Escort LX 5-door

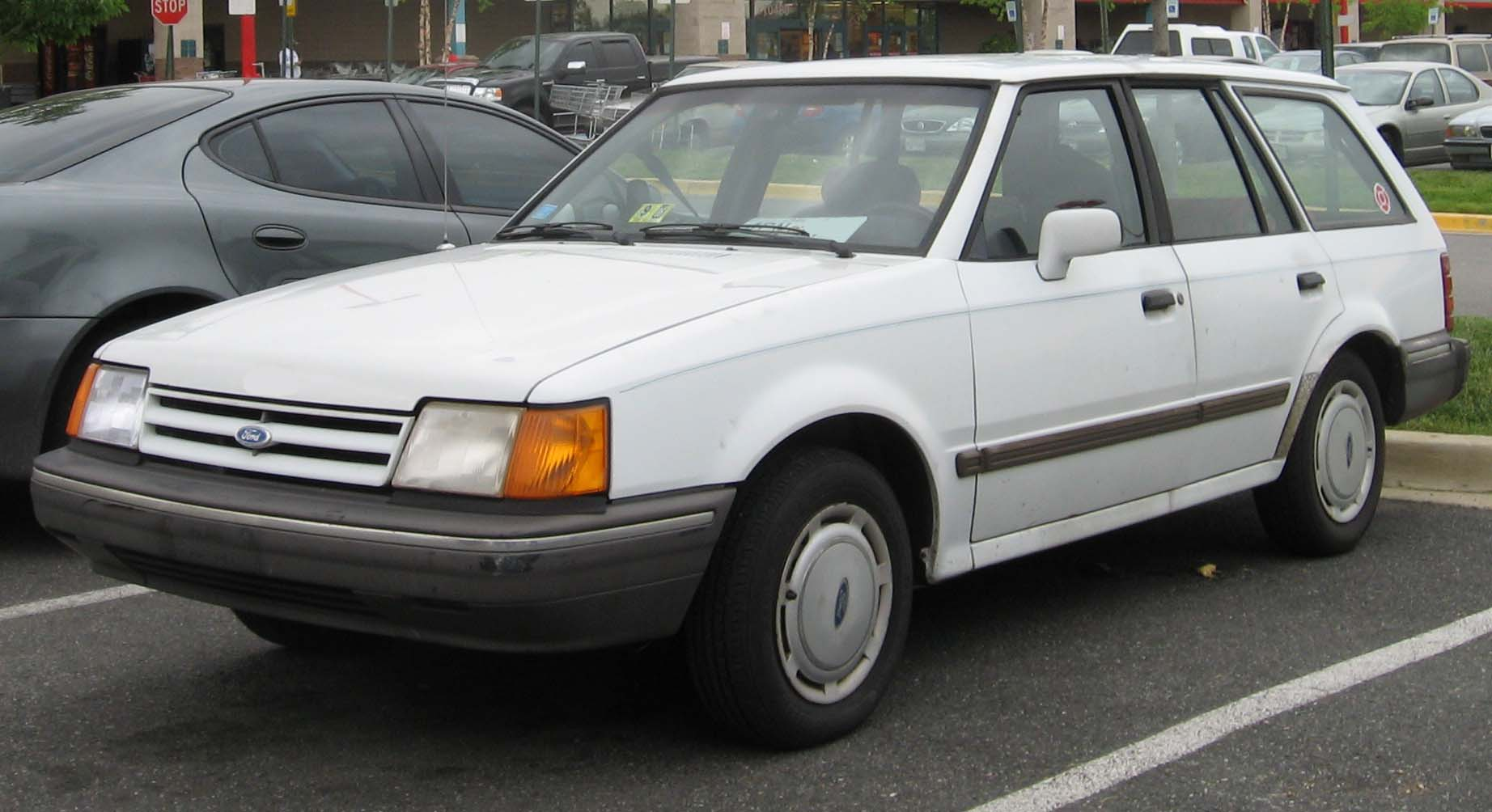
1988–1990 Ford Escort LX wagon

Debuting as a "1985½" model change, Ford released a revision of the first-generation Escort. While much of the bodyshell was carried over, the front fascia saw extensive aerodynamic revisions, with designers fitting a smaller grille and flush-mounted aerodynamic headlamps, and the 1.6 L engine was replaced with a more powerful 1.9 L. Chrome trim was now largely relegated to the bumpers. In a trim revision, the Escort Pony became the lowest-price version of the model line, replacing the Escort L entirely for 1986. The Mazda diesel engine continued to be available in the five-door hatchback versions of the Lynx and Escort until discontinued after 1987.

For 1987, the trim lineup was simplified to a three-version range, including the Pony, GL, and GT. The Pony and GT were offered solely as a three-doors; the GL was offered as a three-door, five-door, and wagon. The model year also saw the retirement of the Mercury Lynx, replaced by the Mercury Tracer during 1987 (a rebranded Ford Laser, itself derived from the Mazda 323). 1987 was also the final year the Escort was built in Canada.

The Escort saw a second facelift in mid-1988, commonly referred to as the "88.5" year, which smoothed out the front and rear fascias. The integrated plastic bumpers replaced the metal bumpers, while the rear side windows were enlarged, and the rear-end design was more rounded. Larger, 14 inch wheels replaced 13 inch units on non-GTs and to accommodate passive-restraint regulations, the Escort received automatic shoulder safety belts. Three-door hatchback models had curving window lines along the sides towards the rear of the cars. The Escort EXP was discontinued and the LX trim replaced the GL, while the Escort Pony replaced the Standard and L versions. Finding some popularity during the final three years of this generation was the Pony model, which was the least-expensive U.S.-built Ford prior to the introduction of the Ford Festiva. Pony models used plainer interior trim with greater use of vinyl and plastic instead of cloth, and four-speed manual transaxles were standard, although buyers could opt for the five-speed manual or the three-speed ATX automatic. The list of available options was very limited, to the extent that such luxuries as power steering and factory-installed air conditioning were not offered (a dealer-installed A/C system was available). Given their lighter weight, the Pony models also had somewhat better fuel economy than the regular Escorts.

The 88.5 Escort remained largely unchanged for the 1989 and 1990 model years. As Ford was gearing up for the April 1990 introduction of the next generation Escort, this version was only built at the Edison Assembly plant in New Jersey for the abbreviated 1990 model year.

=== Powertrain details ===
Developed for the Escort on both sides of the Atlantic, the CVH transverse-mount inline-four engine family was introduced in a 1.6-litre displacement alone for the North American market; a 1.3 L engine was designed and a prototype made, but did not see production due to lack of power and an inability to get it certified. The launch version of the hemi overhead cam inline-four produces 65 hp (48 kW). It was paired with four-speed MTX-2 and five-speed MTX-3 manual transmissions, and a three-speed ATX/FLC automatic transmission. For 1982 models, the engine was tuned to 69 hp (51 kW).

In March 1982 an HO (high output) version of the engine was added, originally only in the EXP and with an automatic transmission, but soon thereafter available with a manual and also in the sporting Escort GT (which had replaced the SS). This unit produces 80 hp (60 kW), thanks to a higher compression ratio, a new exhaust system, and larger venturis in the carburetor. Multi-port fuel injection increased the output of the HO engine to 88 hp (66 kW) for 1983. The 1983 GT was the first US Escort to be offered with a 5-speed manual transmission.

For 1984, two new engines were introduced. A Mazda-sourced, 2.0-litre diesel inline-four producing 52 hp (39 kW) became available on non-GT Escort/Lynx trims; in contrast to the diesel, a turbocharged version of the 1.6-litre four raised output to 120 hp (89 kW) for the EXP Turbo. The turbo engine then found its way into the Escort GT (and Lynx RS) during the 1984 model year.

As part of the mid-1985 model-year revision, the 1.6-litre engine was enlarged to 1.9 litres, increasing output to 86 hp (64 kW); the high output GT engine offered 108 hp (81 kW) thanks to revised intake manifolds, cylinder heads and real headers. The GT was available only with manual transmissions, and the Turbo GT was retired. Estimates state that only about 1,000 Turbo GTs were built in the partial 1984 model year, it is unknown how many early 1985s were made.

For 1987, the standard Escort adopted throttle-body fuel injection, dropping the carburetor; output again inched up to 90 hp (67 kW). The model year also saw the retirement of the diesel engine, discontinued due to low demand as American buyers largely gave up on diesel-engined cars during the 1980s (the proportion of diesel sales overall went from a peak of 6.1 percent in 1981 to 0.37 percent in 1986). Less than 1.2 percent of Escort/Lynx overall sales were diesels.

The Escort's engines received a slightly revised camshaft and roller lifters along with the mid-1988 revision; power of the standard model was unchanged but the GT went up slightly, to 110 hp (82 kW).

Engine configuration	Engine family	Production	Output	Notes
97 cu in (1.6 L) I4	Ford CVH engine	1981–1985	65–70 hp (48–52 kW)	
97 cu in (1.6 L) I4	Ford CVH engine	1982–1985	80 hp (60 kW)	High output (H.O.)
97 cu in (1.6 L) I4	Ford CVH engine	1983–1985	88 hp (66 kW)	GT multi-port EFI
97 cu in (1.6 L) turbocharged I4	Ford CVH engine	1984–1985	120 hp (89 kW)	Turbo GT multi-port EFI
122 cu in (2.0 L) I4 diesel	Mazda RF diesel	1984–1987	52 hp (39 kW)	All except GT
113 cu in (1.9 L) I4	Ford CVH engine	1985.5–1986	86 hp (64 kW)	2-bbl carburetor
113 cu in (1.9 L) I4	Ford CVH engine	1987–1990	90 hp (67 kW)	CFI (Central Fuel Injection)
113 cu in (1.9 L) I4	Ford CVH engine	1985–1988	108 hp (81 kW)	GT; EFI HO; multi-port EFI
113 cu in (1.9 L) I4	Ford CVH engine	1988.5–1990	110 hp (82 kW)	GT; EFI HO; multi-port EFI roller lifters & matching camshafts

=== Production Figures ===
Ford Escort Production Figures
	3-door	5-door	Wagon	Yearly Total
1981	192,554	-	128,173	320,727
1982	165,660	130,473	88,999	385,132
1983	151,386	84,649	79,335	315,370
1984	184,323	99,444	88,756	372,523
1985	212,960	111,385	82,738	407,083
1986	228,013	117,300	84,740	430,053
1987	206,729	102,187	65,849	374,765
1988 (Note: For 1988, Ford EXP production figures are combined with the Ford Escort figures)	251,911	113,470	56,654	422,035
1989	201,288	110,631	30,888	342,807
1990 (Note: The 1990 model year was only 8 months long, it is unclear whether this figure includes early production of the succeeding generation as well)	N/A	N/A	N/A	290,516

=== Variants ===
==== EXP ====
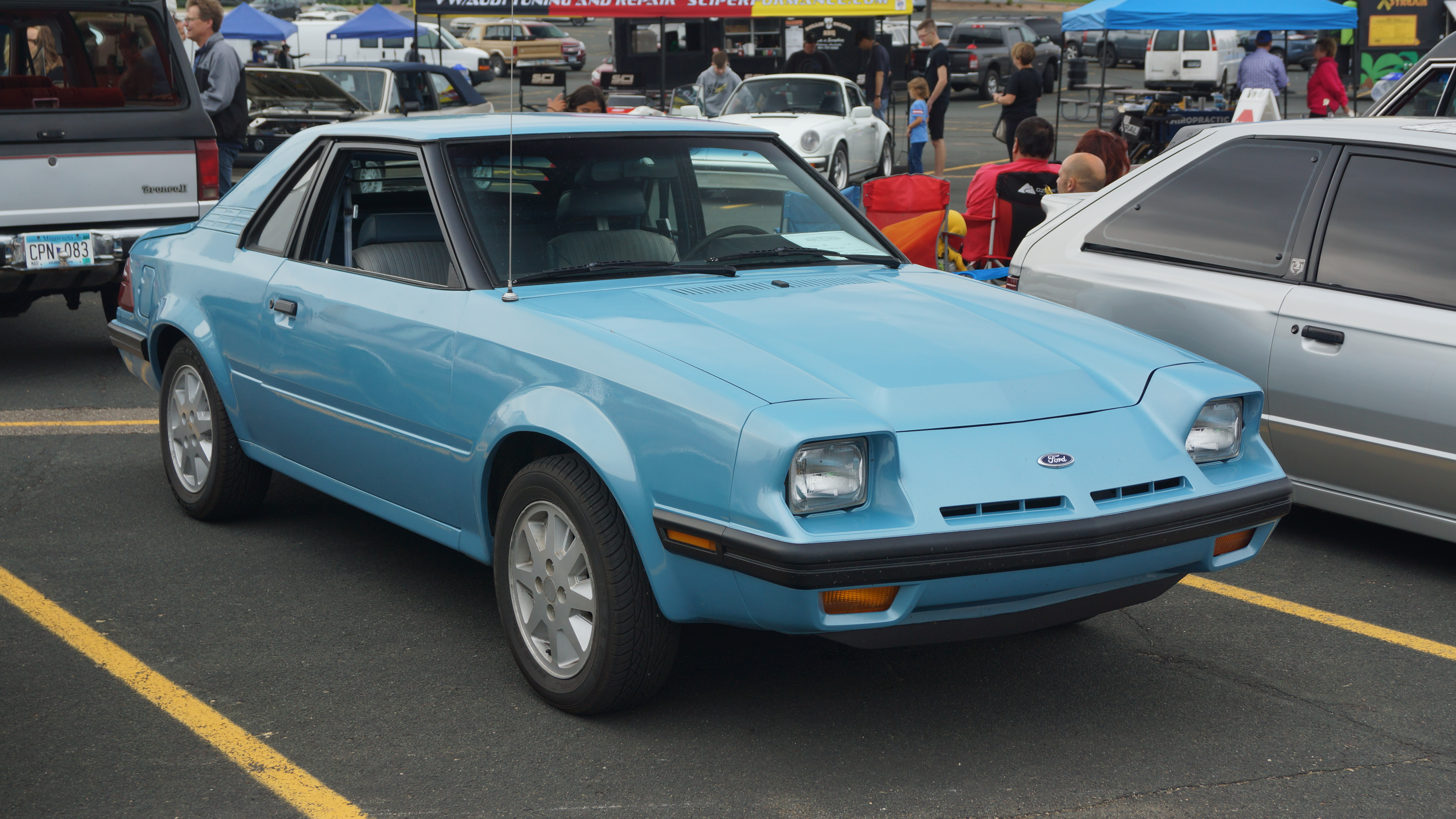
1982 Ford EXP

Introduced for 1982, the two-seat Ford EXP (later Escort EXP) was a coupe variant of the Escort. The first production two-seat Ford since the Thunderbird, the EXP was developed with a sportier exterior appearance (but few performance upgrades) over the standard three-door liftback. The EXP was sold by Lincoln-Mercury from 1982 to 1983 as the Mercury LN7, differing slightly in grille and hatchback design.

Following the 1985 update of the Escort, the EXP underwent a restyling, becoming the Escort EXP. Distinguished by the adoption of the front fascia from the liftback Escort, the two-seat coupe adopted a more subdued appearance. The variant was discontinued after the 1988 model year; as consumer demand shifted away from two-seat vehicles, Ford sought to concentrate its resources on the four-seat Ford Probe (which began development as the intended 1989 Ford Mustang).

==== Escort GT ====
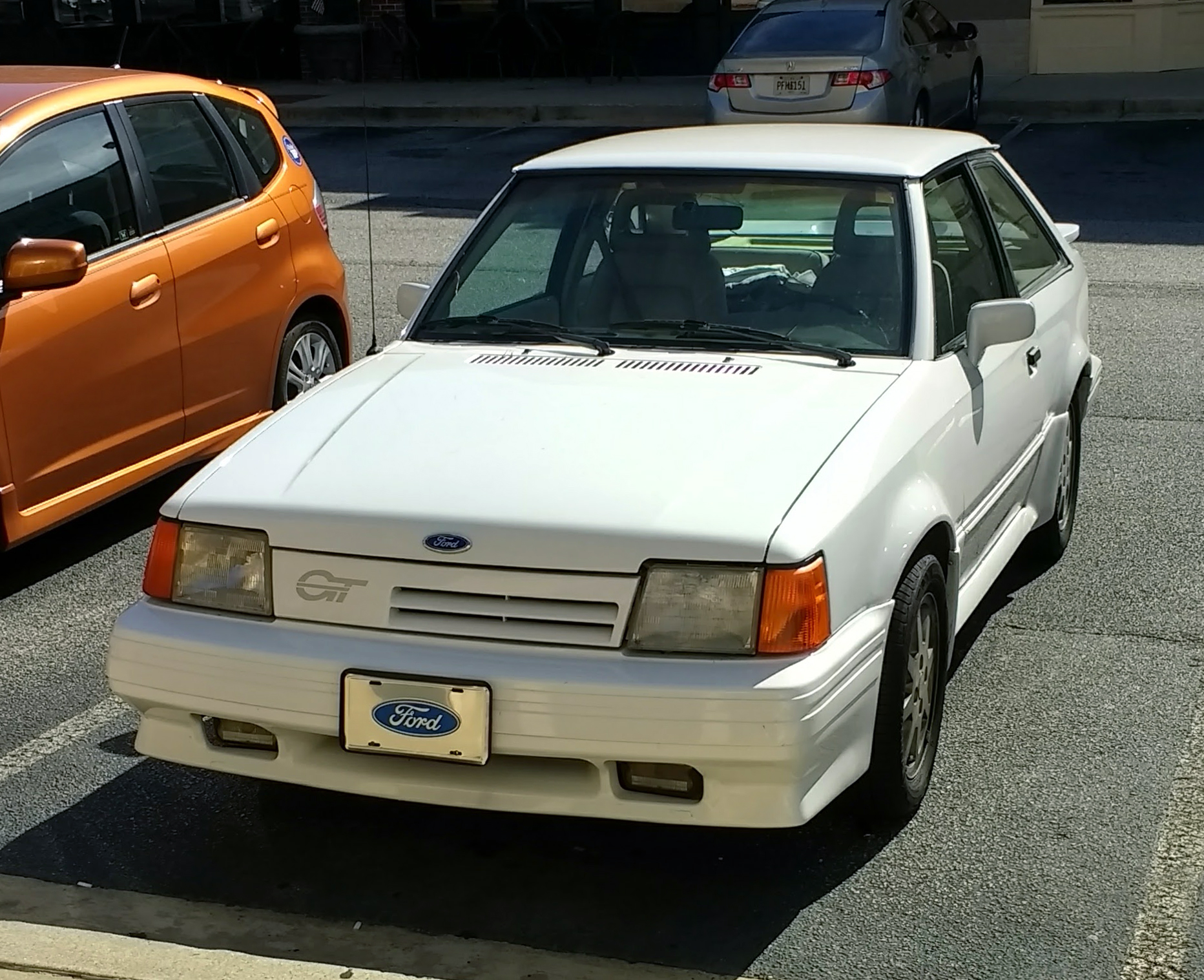
1985 1/2-1988 Ford Escort GT

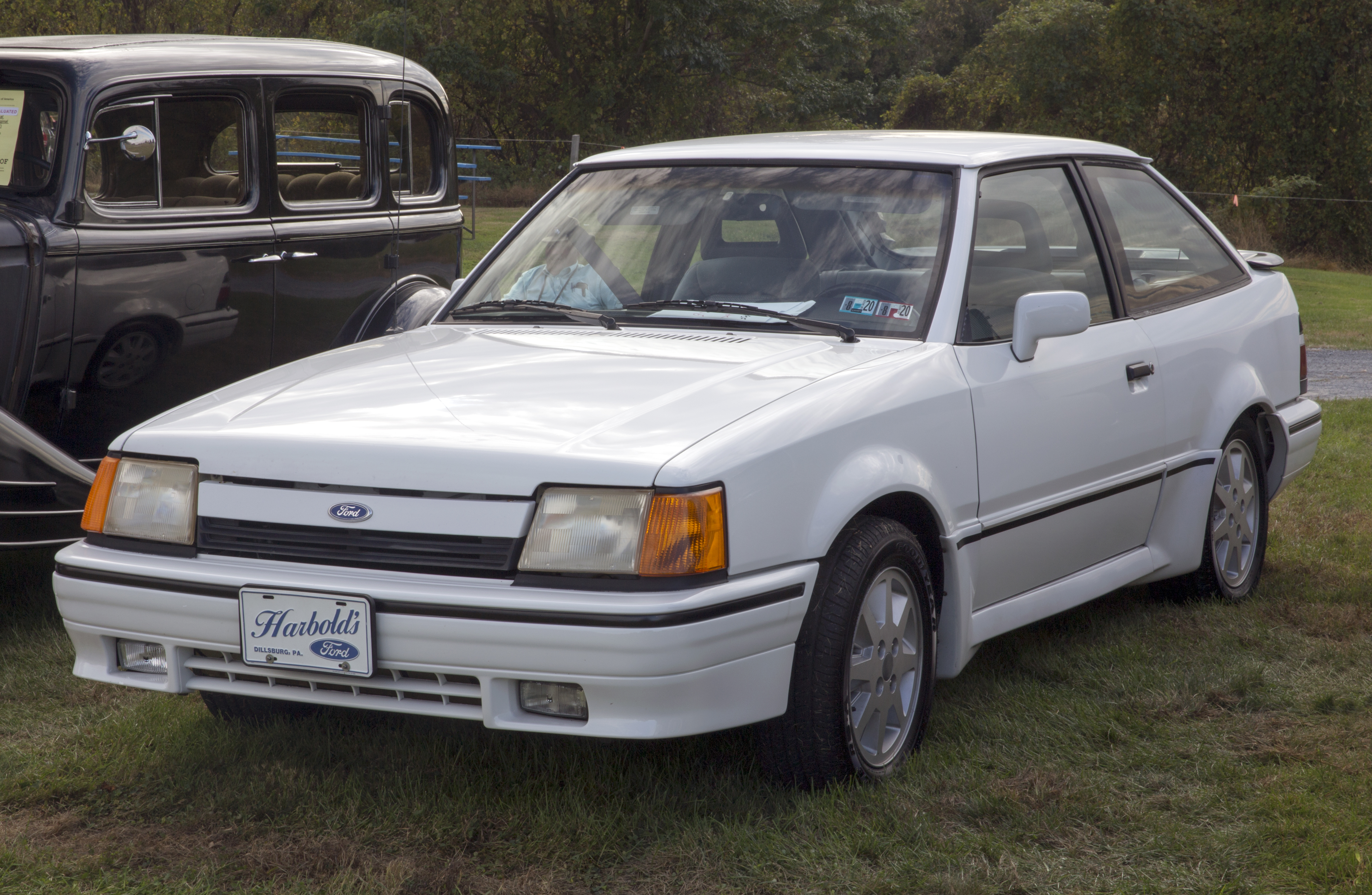
1990 Ford Escort GT

For 1981, Ford introduced the Escort SS as a performance-oriented version of the model line, offered as both a three-door liftback and five-door station wagon. Externally distinguished by blacked-out trim, special stripes and SS decals, the Escort SS also received upgraded brakes, suspension, and model-specific seats and full instrumentation. The drivetrain was unchanged; 6,842 Escort SS were built for the 1981 model year.

As a running change during the 1982 model year, the Escort SS was renamed the Escort GT. In addition to removing conflict with the Chevrolet SS option package, the change aligned the model nomenclature with the namesake Mustang GT (with Ford offering the Escort GT solely as a three-door). Aside from the new HO engine, the GT featured cosmetic changes such as "GT" emblems and stripes, while under the shell there were improved brakes and a close-ratio four-speed gearbox. Also included were metric TR sport alloy wheels with Michelin TRX tires, fog lights, and front and rear spoilers.

For 1983, the GT received a fuel-injected 1.6-litre engine, raising output to 88 hp (66 kW); the engine was now also paired to a 5-speed manual transmission. A Turbo GT was introduced, increasing output to 120 hp (89 kW).

For 1984, the Escort GT was largely carryover, with the Turbo GT lasting into the first half of 1985 production.

For the 1985 1/2 revision of the Escort, the GT initially went on hiatus, returning for the 1986 model year. Alongside the standard Escort, the 1.6 was replaced by a 1.9-litre fuel-injected engine, with the GT receiving a higher-output 108 hp (81 kW) version thereof. Distinguished by its body-color asymmetrical grille, the GT received body-color bumpers (integrating the foglamps), 15-inch alloy wheels, body sill skirts, and optional two-tone paint (similar to the Merkur).

While 1987 was largely carryover, the GT underwent a second facelift midway through the 1988 model year alongside the standard Escort 3-door. The 1988 1/2 Escort GT replaced the asymmetrical grille with a body-color insert and new rear spoiler, while power climbed by two horsepower. For 1989, the GT received another grille revision, and stayed unchanged for 1990.

==== Mercury Lynx ====
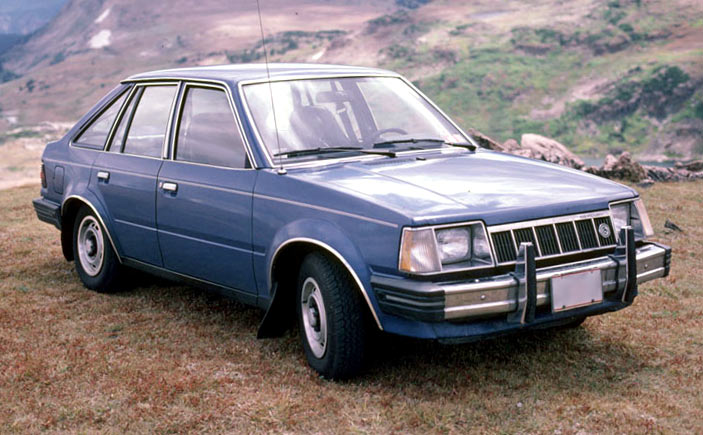
1982 Mercury Lynx 5-door

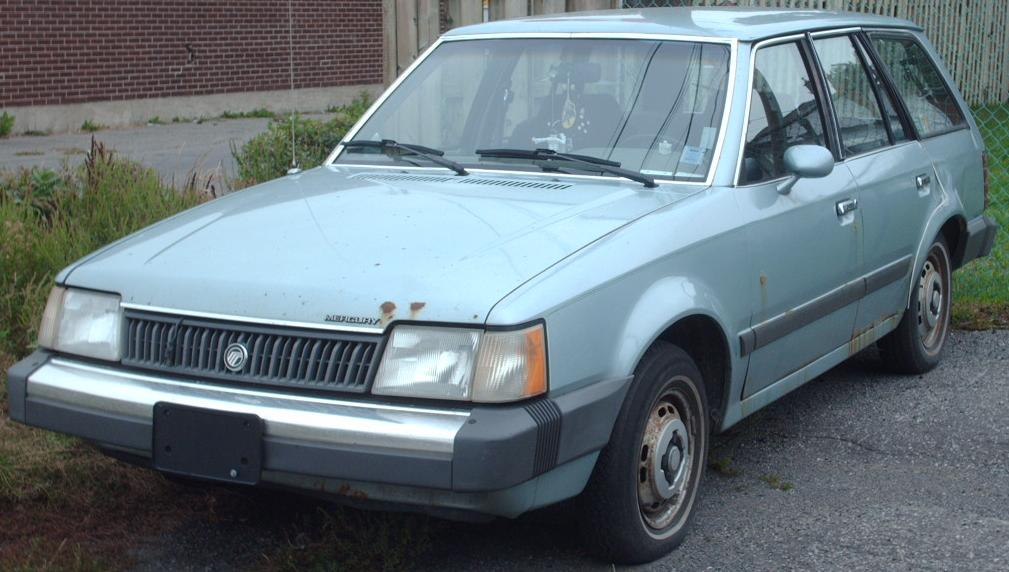
1986–1987 Mercury Lynx wagon

The first-generation Ford Escort was marketed by Lincoln-Mercury as the Mercury Lynx. The successor to the Mercury Bobcat, the Lynx also adopted a nameplate derived from wild cats. Sharing its entire body with the Escort, the Lynx differed from its Ford counterpart primarily in its grille styling, parking light and taillamp lenses, and the use of additional chrome trim. Similar to the Escort, the Lynx was introduced in base, L, GL, GS, LS, and RS trims; the Mercury LN7 was the divisional counterpart of the Ford EXP.

A late addition for the 1983 model year, Mercury introduced the Lynx LTS (Luxury Touring Sedan) in October 1982. The counterpart of the Escort LX, the HO engine equipped LTS was also fitted with blacked-out exterior trim, TRX aluminum wheels, low-back bucket cloth seats, and upgraded suspension, serving as a five-door counterpart of the Lynx RS (Escort GT).

Alongside the Escort, the Lynx underwent a mid-1985 body revision. Distinguished by the addition of the "cascading" Mercury emblem replacing the "big cat" logo (used by the Mercury Cougar), the Lynx received an all-black grille between flush-mounted aerodynamic headlamps. For 1986, the Lynx RS was renamed the XR3 to align it with the Cougar XR7 (and the eventual Topaz XR5).

The Lynx was retired after 1987, but was replaced by the Mazda 323-derived Mercury Tracer model which was sold alongside it for much of the year. The first Mercury sold without a Ford counterpart (in North America) since 1960, the Mexican- and Taiwanese-assembled Tracer shared its body with the Asian-market Ford Laser, sharing much of its chassis architecture with the Mazda 323/Familia, as would the Escort too by 1991.

== Second generation (1991–1996) ==
Second generation (CT120)
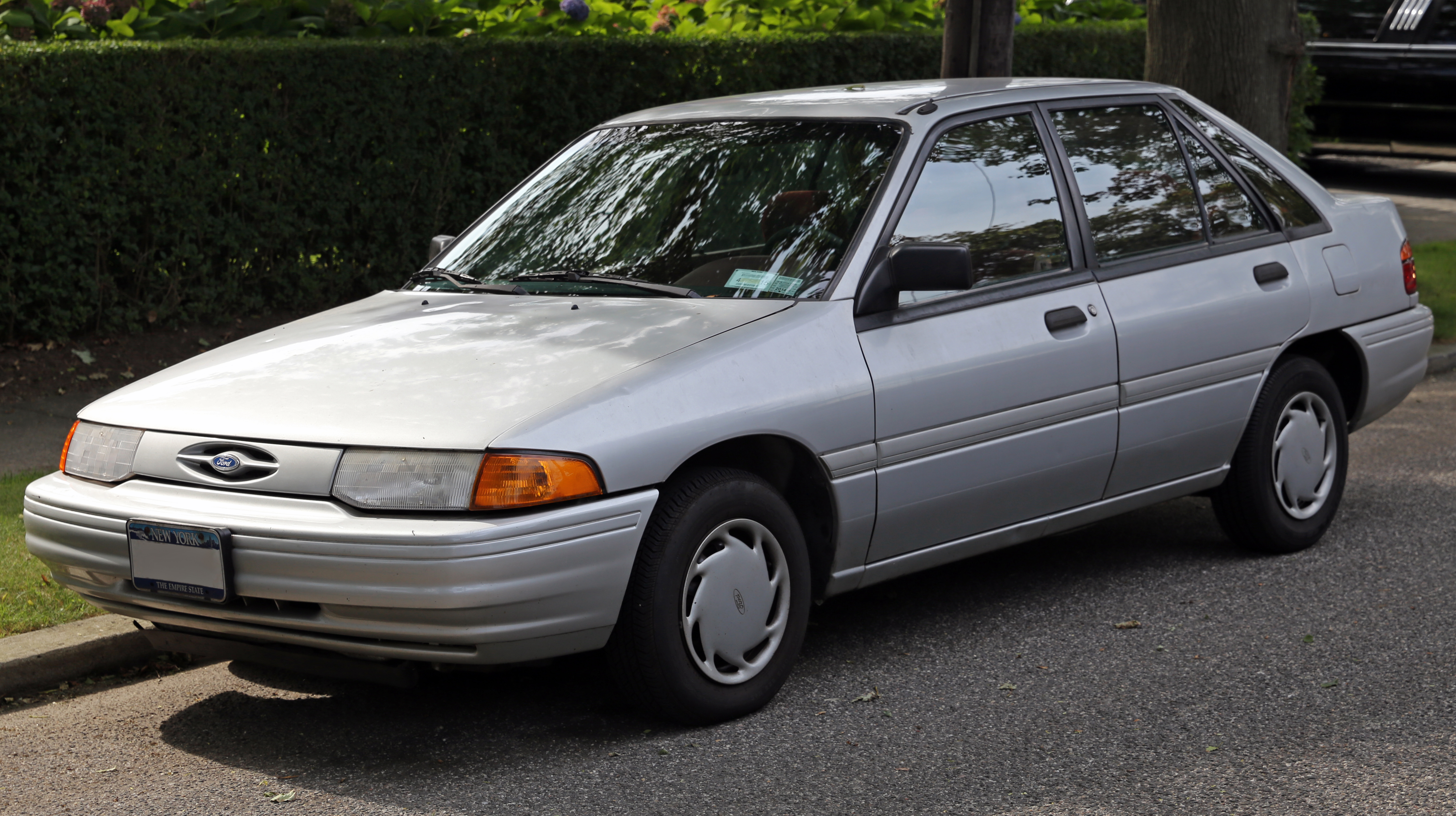
- 1993 Ford Escort 5-door

Overview
- Also called: Ford Laser (Asia and Oceania)
- Production: April 1990 – March 1996
- Model years: 1991–1996
- Assembly: United States: Wayne, Michigan (Wayne Stamping & Assembly); Mexico: Hermosillo, Sonora (Hermosillo Stamping and Assembly)

Body and chassis
- Body style: 3-door hatchback; 4-door sedan; 5-door station wagon; 5-door hatchback
- Platform: Mazda B platform
- Related: Mazda 323; Mazda Protegé; Mercury Tracer

Powertrain
- Engine: 1.8 L BP I4; 1.9 L CVH I4
- Transmission: 5-speed F series manual (1.9); 5-speed G5M manual (1.8); 4-speed F-4EAT automatic

Dimensions
- Wheelbase: 98.4 in (2,499 mm)
- Length: 170.0 in (4,318 mm); Wagon: 171.3 in (4,351 mm); 1992 & 1995–96 Sedan: 170.9 in (4,341 mm)
- Width: 66.7 in (1,694 mm)
- Height: Sedan: 52.7 in (1,339 mm); Hatchback: 52.5 in (1,334 mm); Wagon: 53.6 in (1,361 mm)
- Curb weight: 3-door hatchback – 2,355 lbs (1,068 kg); 5-door hatchback – 2,385 lbs (1,082 kg); 4-door sedan – 2,404 lbs (1,090 kg); 5-door wagon – 2,491 lbs (1,130 kg)

In April 1990, Ford released the second-generation Ford Escort as an early introduction for the 1991 model year. While largely shedding all commonality with its European namesake, Ford continued with the "world car" approach, as the vehicle was developed by Ford with its ties to Mazda (held by Ford with a 25% stake at the time), with the Escort adopting the chassis of the Mazda 323.

In a major design change, a four-door sedan joined the model line for the 1992 model year, sharing its underpinnings with the Mazda Protegé. In Southeast Asia and Australia, the Escort was marketed as the Ford Laser; in North America, the Mercury Tracer adopted the body of the Escort (the previous generation used the body of the 1987–1989 Ford Laser).

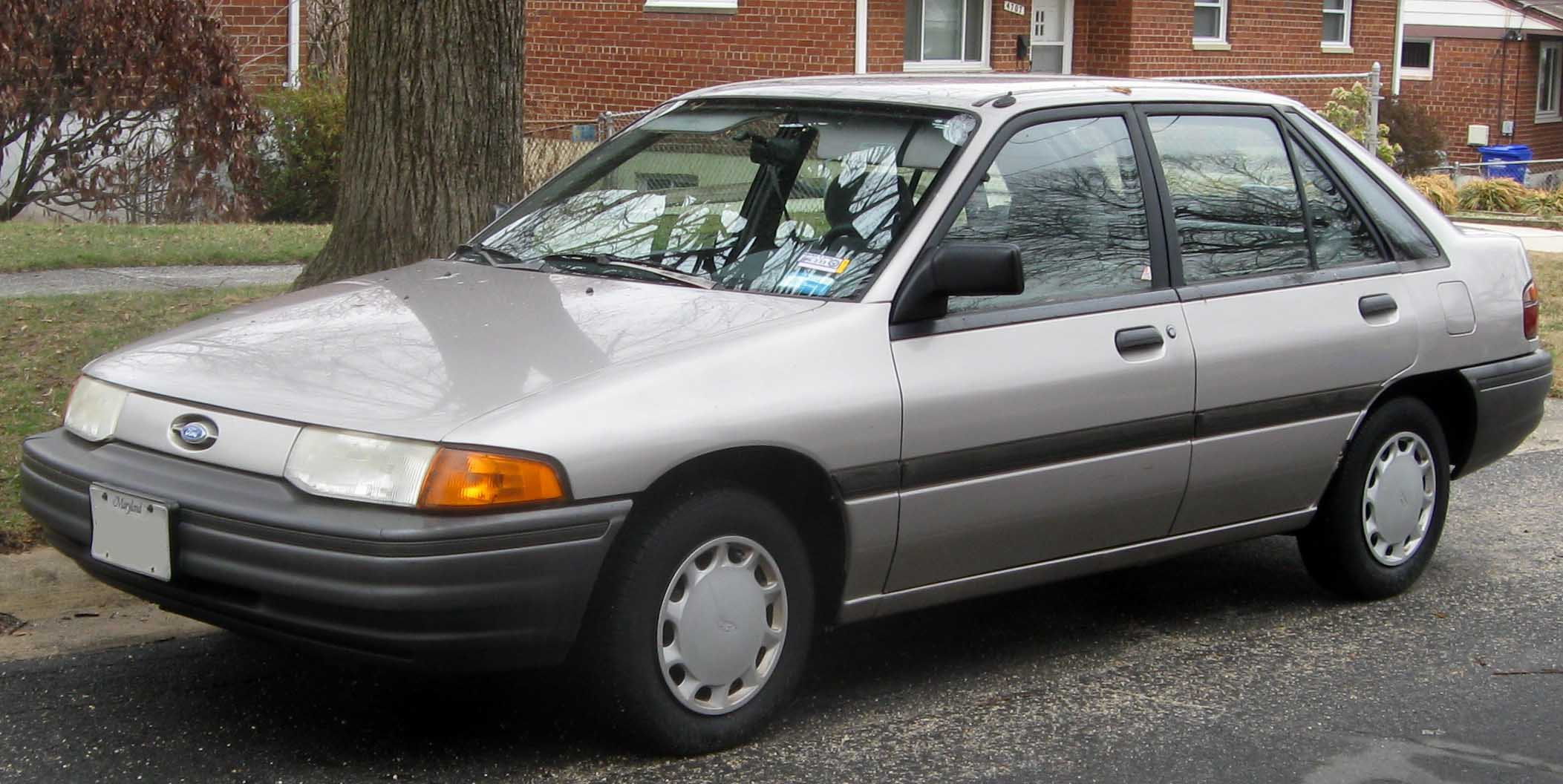
1991–1992 Ford Escort LX 5-door

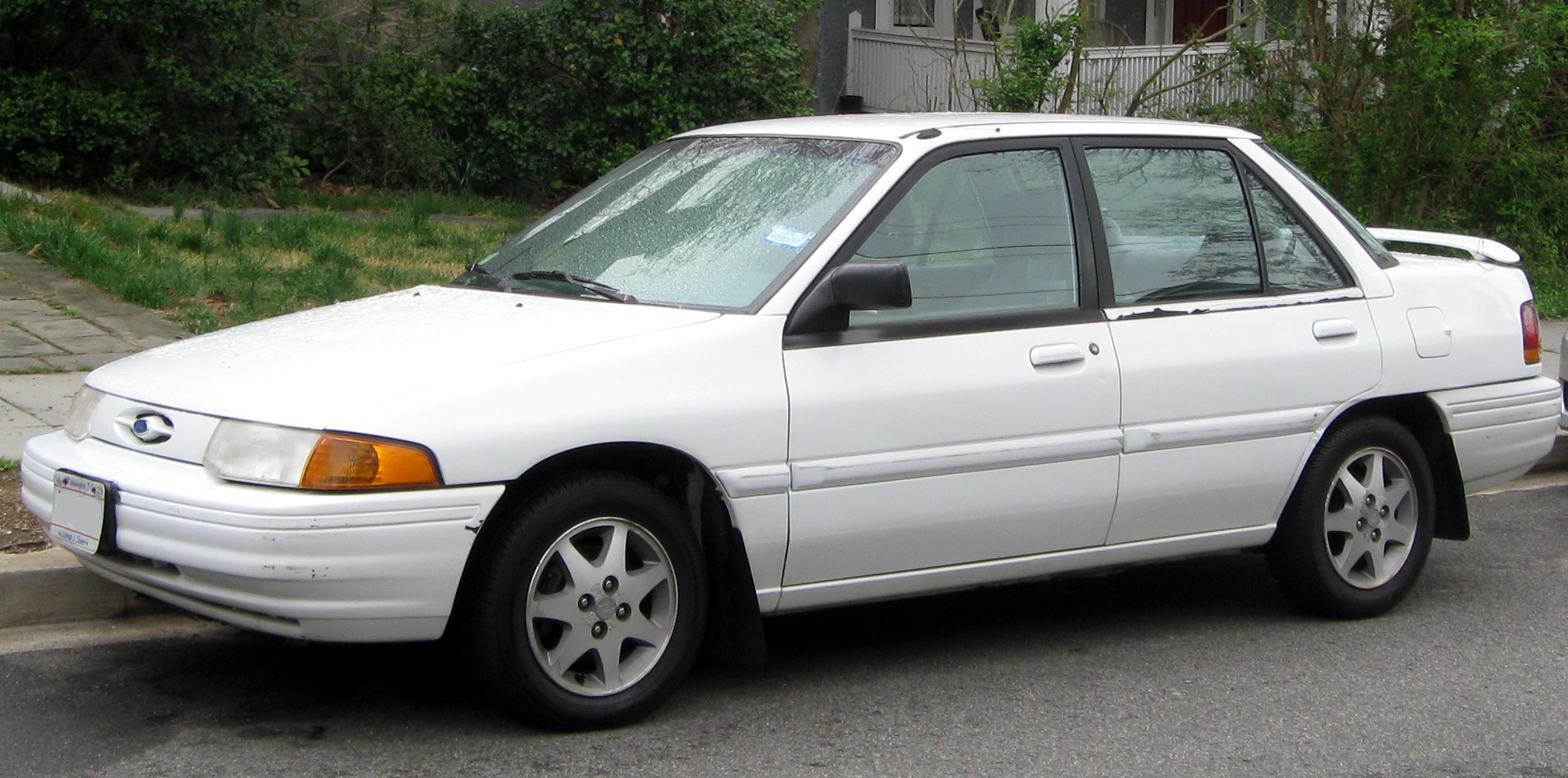
1995–1996 Ford Escort LX 4-door

=== Design overview ===
The second-generation Ford Escort adopted the front-wheel drive Mazda B platform (BG; designated CT120 by Ford), shared with the Mazda 323/Protegé in North America. The wheelbase was extended to 98.4 inches (almost within an inch of the Tempo). To improve handling stability, a rear anti-sway bar was added to the rear suspension. In another design change, the Escort adopted independent rear suspension.

The Escort shared its body with the third-generation Ford Laser, introduced in Japan in 1989. The standard Escort was styled with a grille insert in line with the Ford Taurus (the Laser, a grille design closer in line with the Falcon); the license plate was placed between the taillamps (the Laser placed its license plate on the rear bumper to accommodate wider Australian units). On sedans, the Escort was styled with a body-color C-pillar; the Laser used a black-painted C-pillar (featured on higher-trim Mercury Tracers).

The Escort/Tracer was the only version of the Mazda platform produced as a station wagon, featuring vertical taillamps (in line with the larger Taurus). After the 1991 model year (and the discontinuation of the LTD Country Squire), the Escort served as half of the Ford station wagon line in North America. The higher-performance Escort GT made its return, distinguished by its asymmetrical grille, alloy wheels, and full-width taillamps.

==== Powertrain details ====
While the Laser shared powertrain offerings with the Mazda Familia/323, the Escort carried over the 1.9L CVH inline-four (retuned to 88 hp) from the previous generation. For 1991, the engine replaced the previous throttle-body fuel injection with a sequential configuration (SEFI); to allow for a lower hoodline, the engine was tilted forward.

The Escort GT dropped the CVH engine, replacing it with the Mazda-sourced 127 hp DOHC BP 1.8L I4 (shared with the Mazda Protegé LX and Mazda MX-5). The 4-speed manual and 3-speed automatic transmissions were dropped. Both engines were paired with a standard 5-speed manual transmission; a 4-speed automatic was offered with the 1.9L engine as an option.

The 1.9-litre engine was one of the first Ford engines to feature distributorless ignition (known as EDIS, Electronic Distributorless Ignition System). The Ford Escort GT was fitted with four-wheel disc brakes.

Engine configuration	Engine family	Production	Fuel system	Output (SAE Net)		Notes
Engine configuration	Engine family	Production	Fuel system	Horsepower	Torque	Notes
113 cu in (1.9 L) I4	Ford CVH engine	1991–1996	Sequential Fuel Injection (SEFI)	88 hp (66 kW)	108 ft⋅lbf (146 N⋅m)	Standard/Pony, LX
112 cu in (1.8 L) I4	Mazda BP engine	1991–1996	Multi-port Fuel Injection	127 hp (95 kW)	114 ft⋅lbf (155 N⋅m)	GT, LX-E

=== Model year changes ===
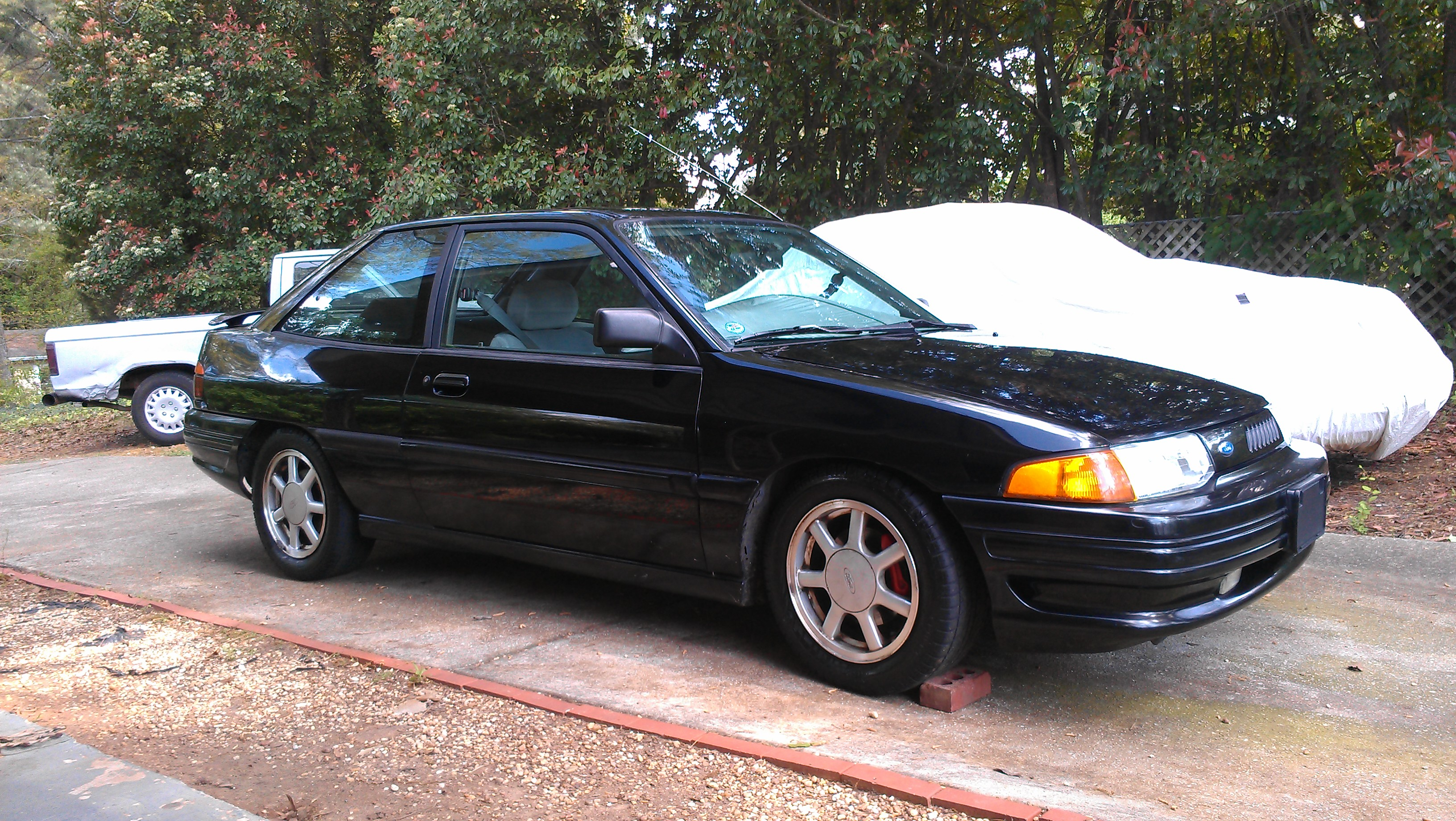
1994 Escort GT

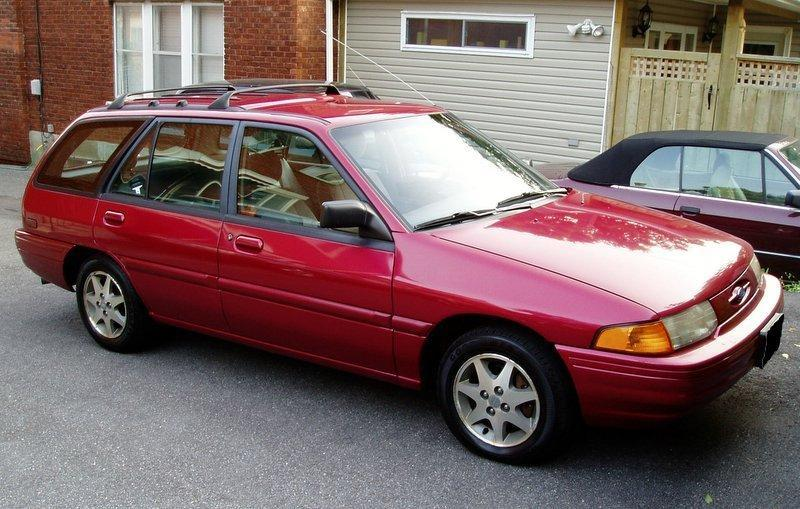
1995 Escort LX station wagon

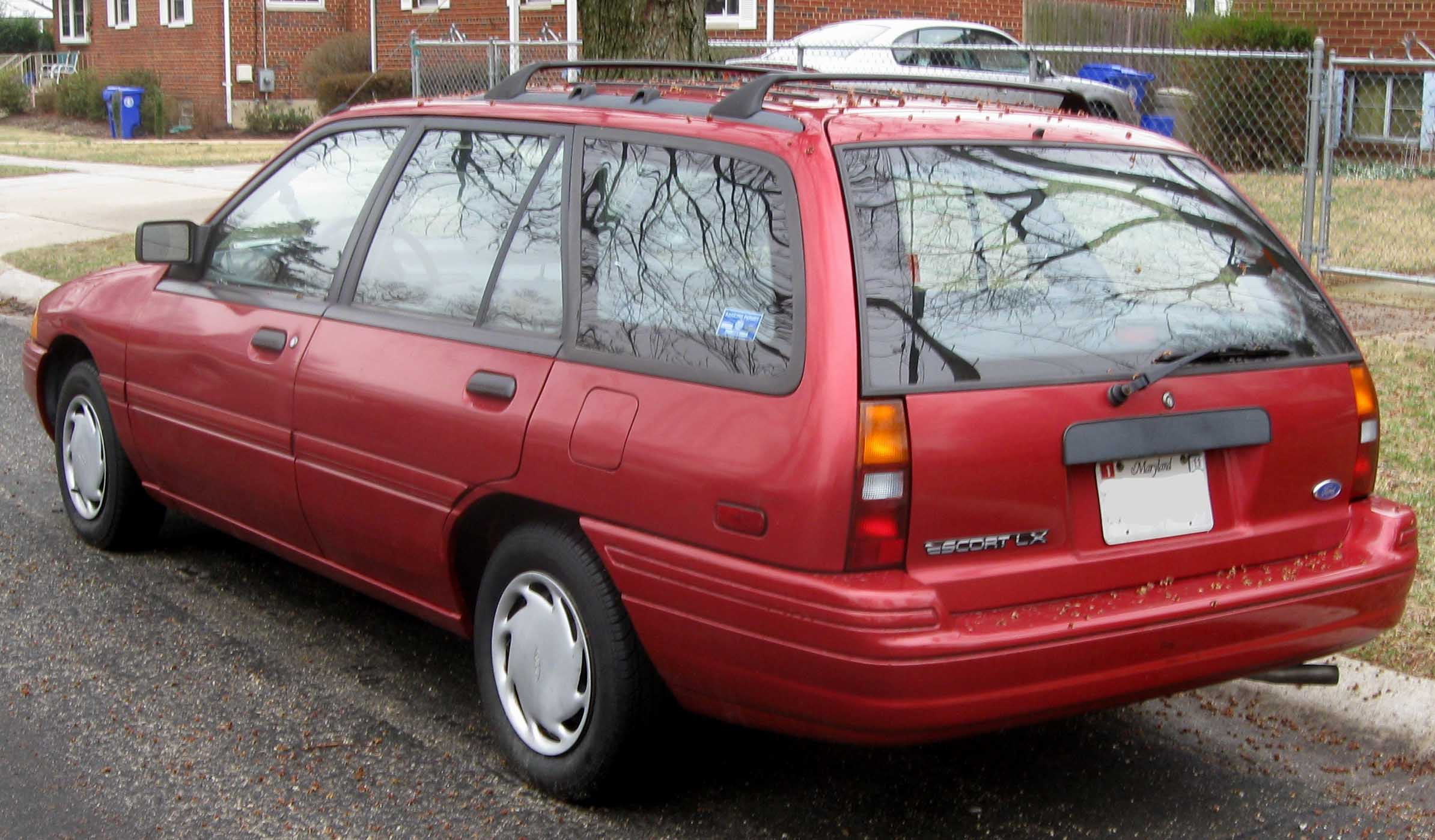
1994 Escort LX wagon rear

For 1991, Ford introduced the second-generation Escort under Pony, LX, and GT trims, returning the previous three-door and five-door hatchbacks and five-door station wagon. While growing in wheelbase, the Escort saw only negligible growth in overall size, gaining less than two inches in length and approximately 100 pounds of weight. The US-market models have the automatic shoulder belts, while the Canadian market models (except for the GT and the sedan models until 1993) have the manual shoulder belts.

For 1992, to improve engine cooling, the grille oval around the Ford emblem was enlarged in size. In a trim change, the base-trim Pony was dropped for the last trim, becoming an unnamed standard trim Escort. For the first time, a four-door Escort sedan was introduced, with the LX-E trim serving as the Ford counterpart of the Mazda Protegé LX and four-door Escort GT (equipped with four-wheel disc brakes, larger front brakes, larger clutch, equal-length driveshafts, larger anti-roll bars, dual-outlet exhaust, sport interior, and 1.8L DOHC engine).

For 1993, 1.9-litre Escorts moved from 13-inch to 14-inch wheels (last used in 1990); the GT continued its use of 15-inch wheels. For non-wagon LXs, a "Sport Appearance" option package was introduced; along with 14-inch alloy wheels, the option included a decklid spoiler and the full-width taillamps used by the GT.

For 1994, a driver-side airbag became standard.

For 1995, dual airbags became standard for 1995, requiring a redesign of the dashboard, with the motorized seat belts were retained on the US-market models through 1996.

For 1996, the Escort saw few changes as the third generation was introduced for 1997.

=== Production Figures ===
Ford Escort Production Figures
	3-door	5-door	Sedan	Wagon	Yearly Total
1991 (Note: The 1991 model year lasted about 16 months)	182,445	114,944	-	57,337	354,726
1992	81,023	57,651	62,066	58,950	259,690
1993	89,761	58,909	69,796	157,239	375,705
1994	87,888	39,837	59,052	108,372	295,149
1995	91,875	50,233	62,713	115,960	320,781
1996	64,964	11,807	13,439	35,199	125,409
Total	597,956	333,381	267,066	533,057	1,731,460

== Third generation (1997–2003) ==
Third generation (CT120)
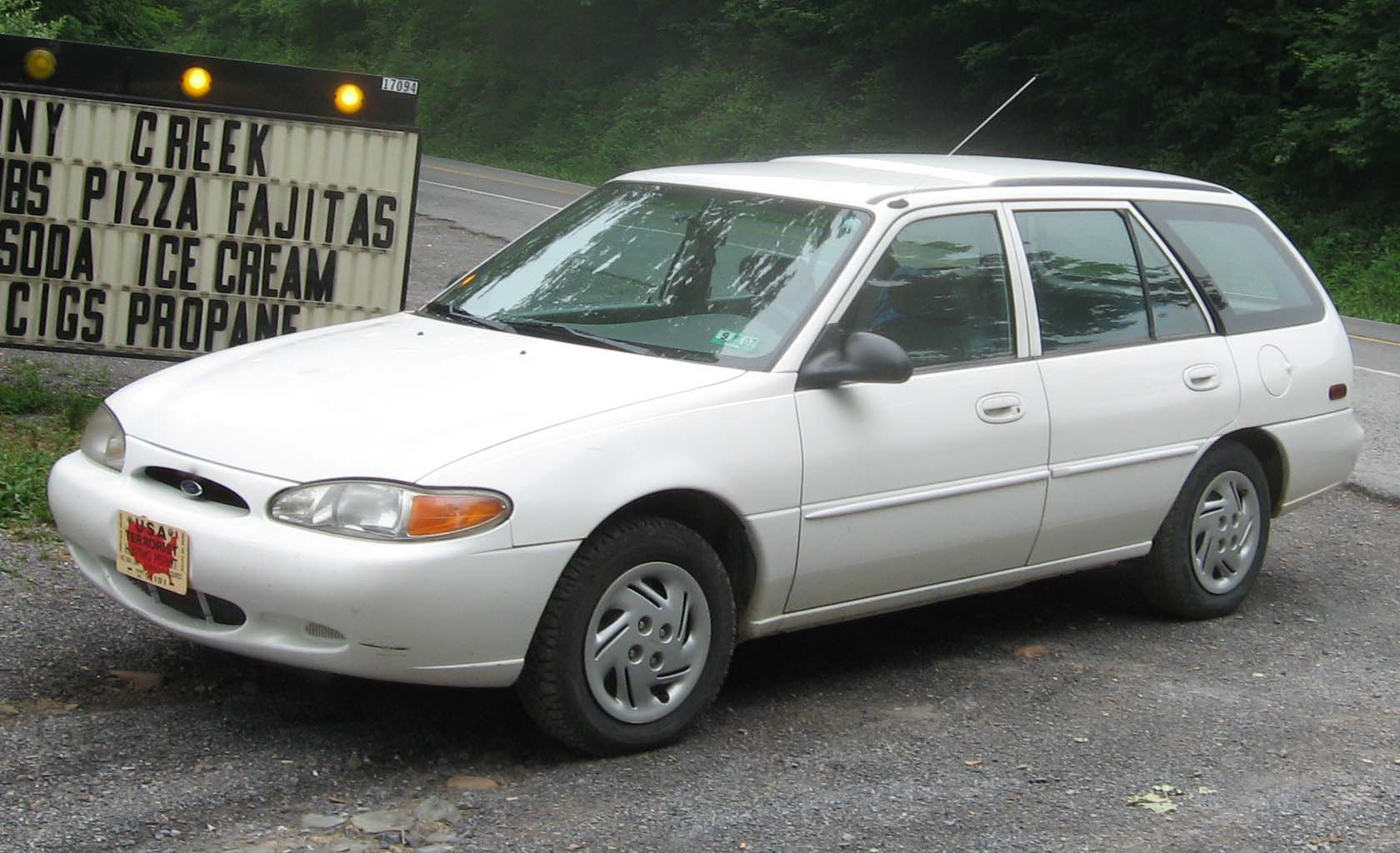

Overview
- Production: 1996–2002
- Model years: 1997–2002
- Assembly: United States: Wayne, Michigan (Wayne Stamping & Assembly); Mexico: Hermosillo, Sonora (Hermosillo Stamping and Assembly)

Body and chassis
- Body style: 4-door sedan; 5-door station wagon
- Platform: Mazda B platform
- Related: Mazda Protegé; Mercury Tracer

Powertrain
- Engine: 2.0 L SPI2000 SOHC I4; 2.0 L Zetec DOHC I4
- Transmission: 5-speed G5M manual; 4-speed F-4EAT automatic

Dimensions
- Wheelbase: 98.4 in (2,499 mm)
- Length: Wagon: 172.7 in (4,390 mm); Sedan: 174.7 in (4,440 mm)
- Width: 67.0 in (1,700 mm)
- Height: Sedan: 53.3 in (1,354 mm); Wagon: 53.9 in (1,369 mm)
- Curb weight: 2,468 lb (1,119 kg)

The third-generation Escort was released for 1997. Carrying over the Mazda-designed chassis of the previous generation, the third generation underwent a substantial revision to the exterior and interior. This generation marked the divergence of the model line from the Mazda 323/Protegé (redesigned for 1995, with the Ford Laser following suit); it again served as the basis for the Mercury Tracer.

In response to market demand, Ford offered the Escort only as a sedan and station wagon, retiring the 3-door and 5-door hatchbacks sold since 1981; the Escort GT was also discontinued. For 1998, Ford introduced the Escort ZX2 (see below) as the first two-door coupe of the model line.

During 1998, Ford began to roll out the compact Ford Focus as its newest-generation "world car". Developed to replace the Escort and Orion in North America and Europe, the Focus also replaced the Laser in Asian and Australian markets; in Mexico, Ford also replaced the Escort by its Ford Ikon subcompact sedan (derived from the Ford Fiesta). In contrast to the 1980 Escort, the Focus was far more unified in its development; along with fitment of differing drivetrains (to accommodate regional demands), the Focus differed only nominally across major markets (with the exception of trim packaging).

As the Escort was succeeded by the Focus in North America, the sedan was marketed for fleet sale only for the 2001 and 2002 model years. In June 2002, the final Ford Escort sedan left the assembly line; in June 2003, the final Ford ZX2 was assembled.

=== Design overview ===
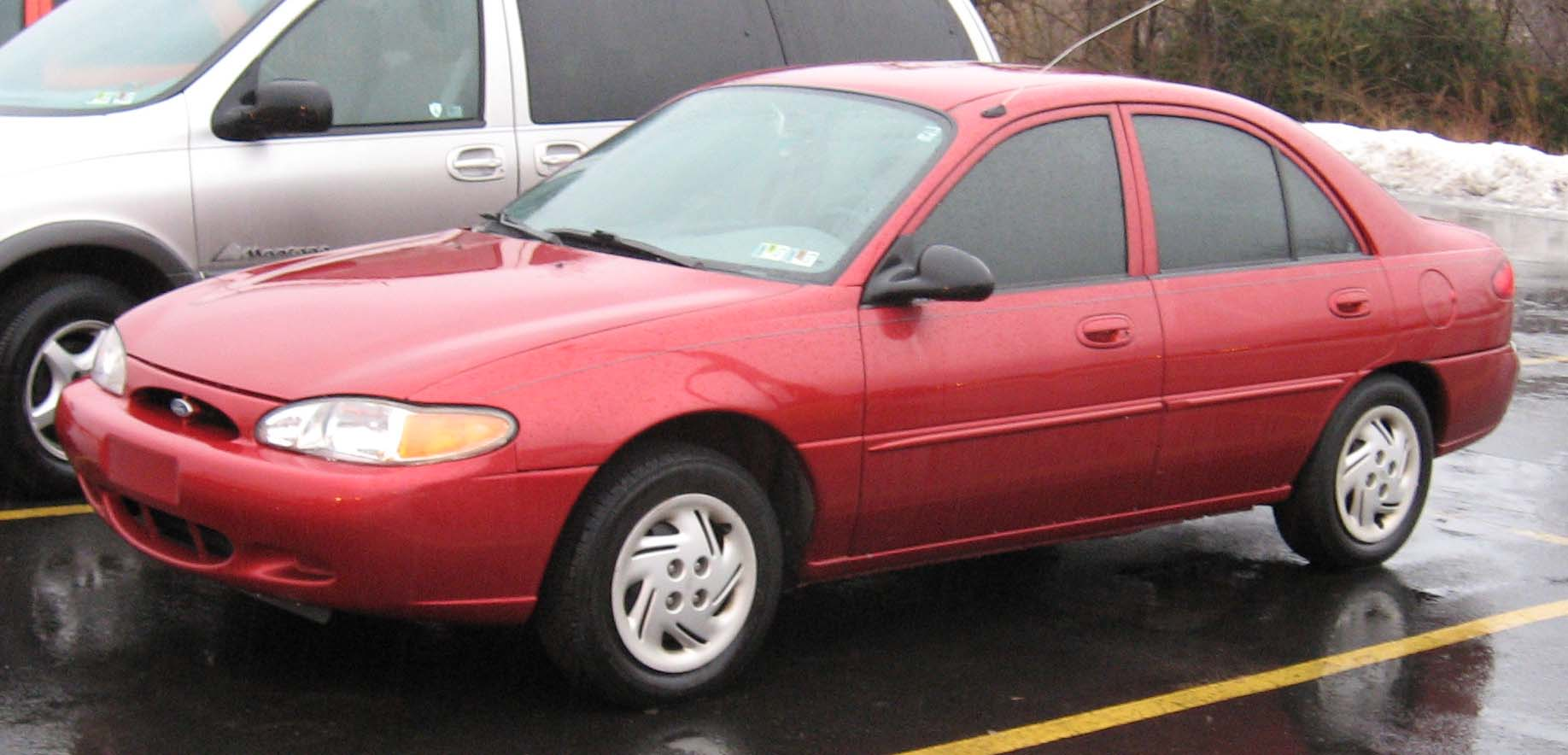
1997 Ford Escort sedan

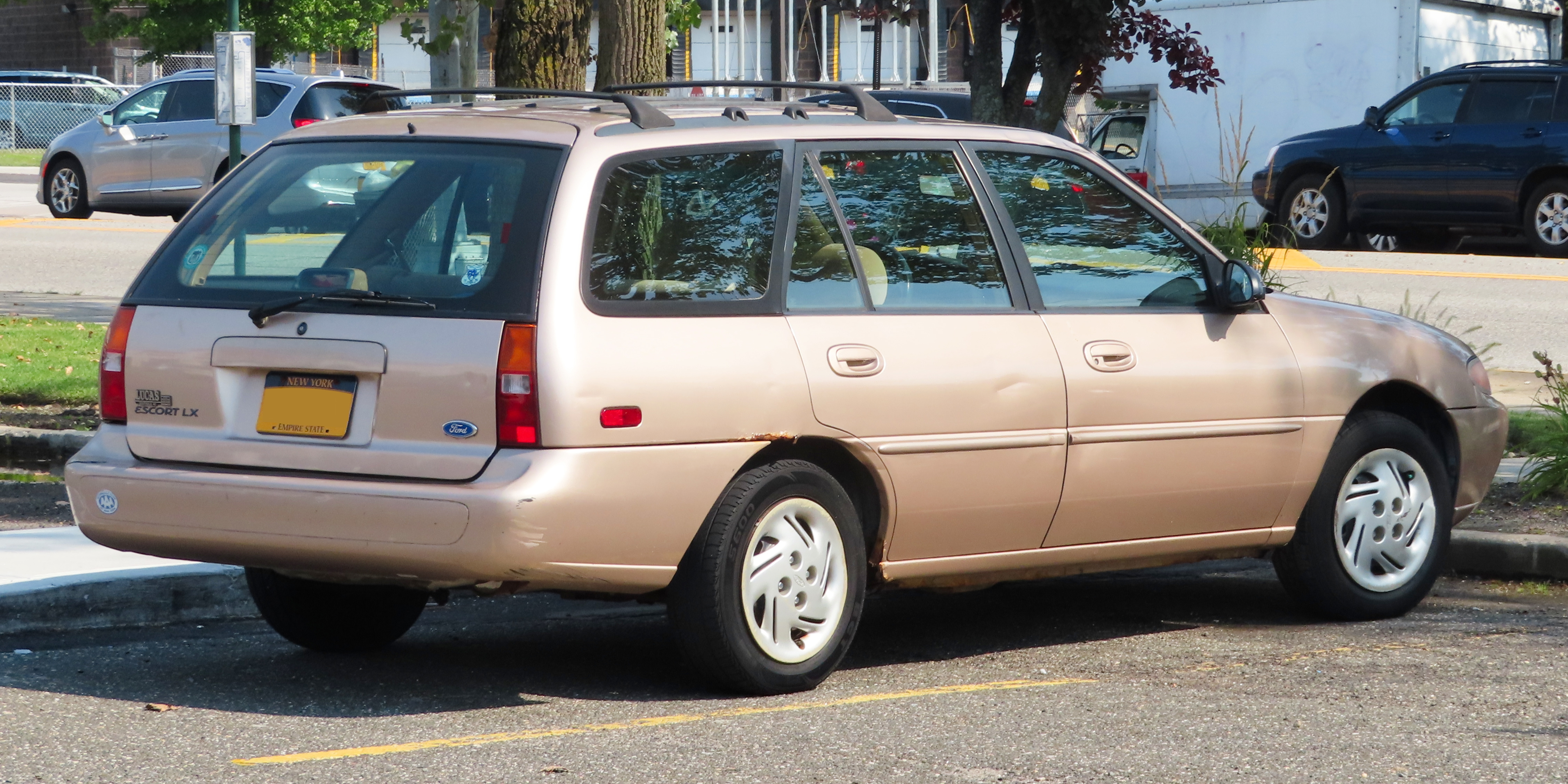
1997 Ford Escort LX Sport station wagon, rear view

The third-generation Ford Escort again used the Mazda BG/Ford CT120 platform, retaining the 98.4-inch wheelbase of the previous generation. The chassis was upgraded for a 25% increase of structural rigidity and the suspension was retuned to substantially reduce levels of understeer; in another revision to improve handling, 14-inch wheels were made standard.

The loss of the hatchbacks led to the retirement of the Escort GT, but Ford returned the standard base (renamed SE for 1998) and upgraded LX trims. An optional "Sport" package was offered for the sedan, including aluminum wheels, a sport exhaust tip, a tachometer and a rear decklid spoiler. A very rare trim package was offered in 1999 with chrome 14 in (36 cm) wheel covers and other features.

Styled in line with the 1996 Ford Taurus, the Escort sedan received a heavily curved roofline, a curved set of taillamps (set in a contrasting base), and flat oval headlamps (in contrast to the nearly circular headlamps of the Taurus); the Ford Blue Oval emblem was housed in a half-oval grille (a larger intake was located in the bumper between mountings for optional foglights). The interior also underwent extensive revisions; along with redesigned seats and door panels, the dashboard (featuring a tiered layout similar to the Ford Windstar) also adopted an oval control panel for the radio and climate controls (similar to the Taurus). In a welcome change, the motorized seatbelts of the previous generation were deleted (as dual airbags had been standard since 1995).

While adopting the same chassis and powertrain upgrades as the sedan (and its redesigned interior), the Escort station wagon shared nearly its entire body with the previous generation (from the base of the windshield rearward). Along with badging, the 1997 station wagon was distinguished by updated sideview mirrors, door handles, and taillamps; dependent on trim, the window frames are either black or body-colored. For the 2000 model year, Ford discontinued the Escort station wagon, replacing it with the Ford Focus wagon.

Through its production, the third-generation Escort saw few design updates. For 1999, the sedan saw a minor visual revision to the rear fascia (integrating the reverse lamps into the taillamp units); the same year, the sedan was fitted with an interior trunklid release (in compliance with federal regulations). For 2000, SE and LX trims were consolidated to a single unnamed trim for the sedan (coinciding with Ford ending retail sale of the model line).

==== Powertrain details ====
The third-generation Escort sedan and station wagon were fitted with an all-new 2.0L SPI2000 inline-4. A larger-bore version of the 1.9L engine, the new CVH-based design featured a variable-length intake manifold to increase fuel efficiency and power, raising output from 88hp to 110hp. A five-speed manual transmission was standard, with a four-speed automatic offered as an option.

Model	Engine configuration	Engine family	Production	Output (SAE Net)		Maximum RPM	Notes
Model	Engine configuration	Engine family	Production	Horsepower	Torque	Maximum RPM	Notes
base, SE, LX Mercury Tracer (all)	121 cu in (2.0 L) SOHC I4	Ford CVH engine	1997–2002	110 hp (82 kW) at 5000 rpm	125 ft⋅lbf (169 N⋅m) at 3750 rpm	5500 rpm	SPI2000 (split-port induction)
ZX2	121 cu in (2.0 L) DOHC I4	Ford Zetec engine	1998–2003	130 hp (97 kW) at 5750 rpm	127 ft⋅lbf (172 N⋅m) at 4250 rpm	6500 rpm redline 7200 rpm limited	
ZX2 S/R	121 cu in (2.0 L) DOHC I4	Ford Zetec engine	1999–2000	143 hp (107 kW)	146 ft⋅lbf (198 N⋅m)		

=== Variants ===
==== Mercury Tracer ====
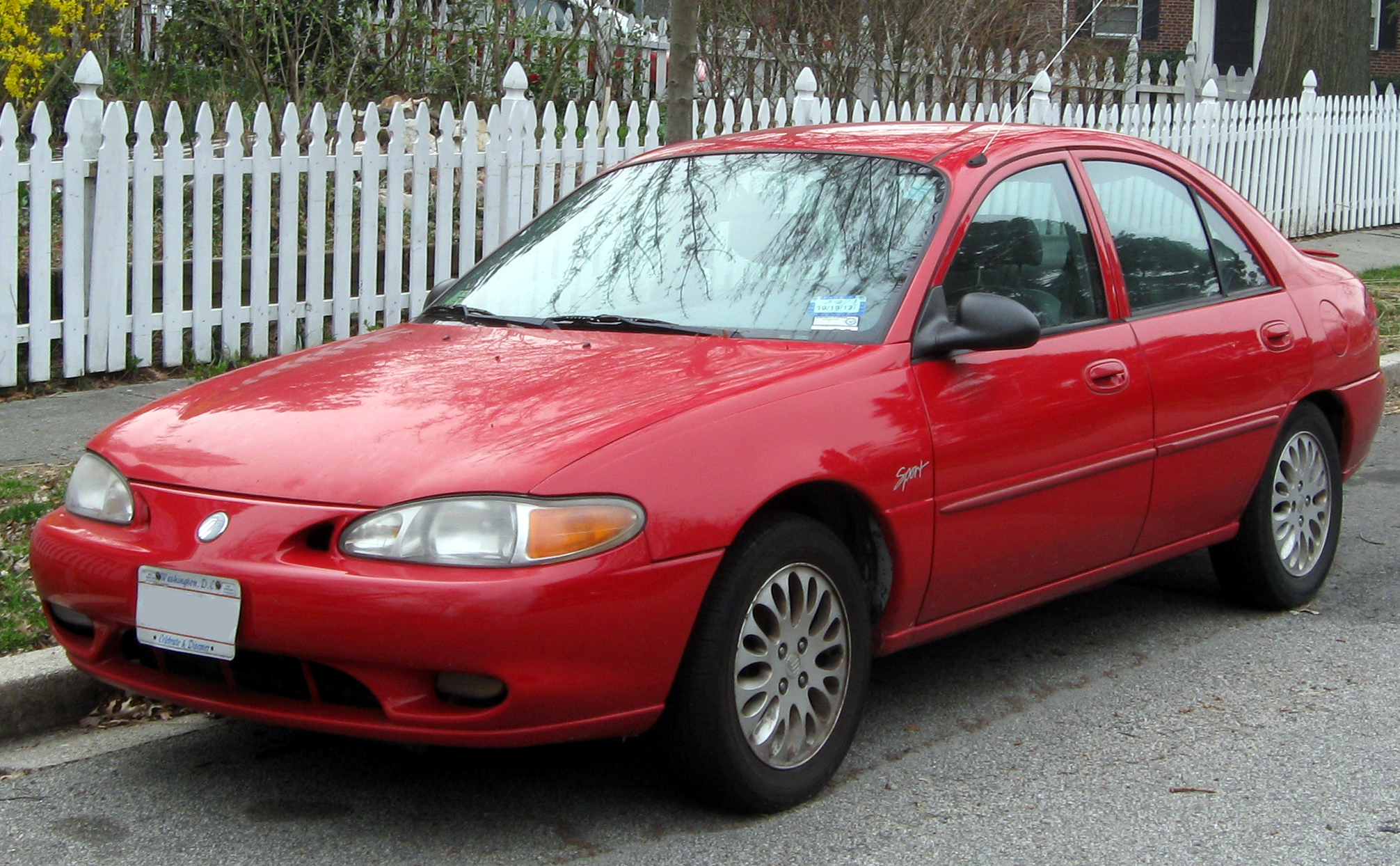
1999 Mercury Tracer LS Sport

The third-generation Mercury Tracer was released for 1997, again sharing chassis commonality with the Ford Escort. While the Tracer again shared nearly its entire body with its Ford counterpart, designers sought to better distinguish the two model lines, with the model featuring a full-width taillamp (in contrast to the inset brake lamps on a darker base) and a separate design for the front fascia. In contrast to the Escort (and the rest of the Mercury line), the Tracer did not have a grille between the headlamps (except for vestigial intakes next to the headlamps), with ventilation relocated to the lower half of the front bumper.

In line with Mercury tradition, the Tracer was offered in standard GS and upgraded LS trims. For the GS, the Trio appearance package made its return (adding alloy wheels, decals, and a decklid spoiler); for 1999, the LS introduced a Sport option package (similar to the Trio, but also including upgraded bucket seats, fog lamps, a chromed exhaust tip). The Trio was fitted with a basket-weave wheel design, with a flower-petal design used on the Sport.

For 2000, Mercury discontinued the Tracer and did not market a version of the Ford Focus; within 3 months of its discontinuation, the car line of the division was pared down to the Sable and Grand Marquis.

==== ZX2 ====
Ford Escort ZX2 Ford ZX2
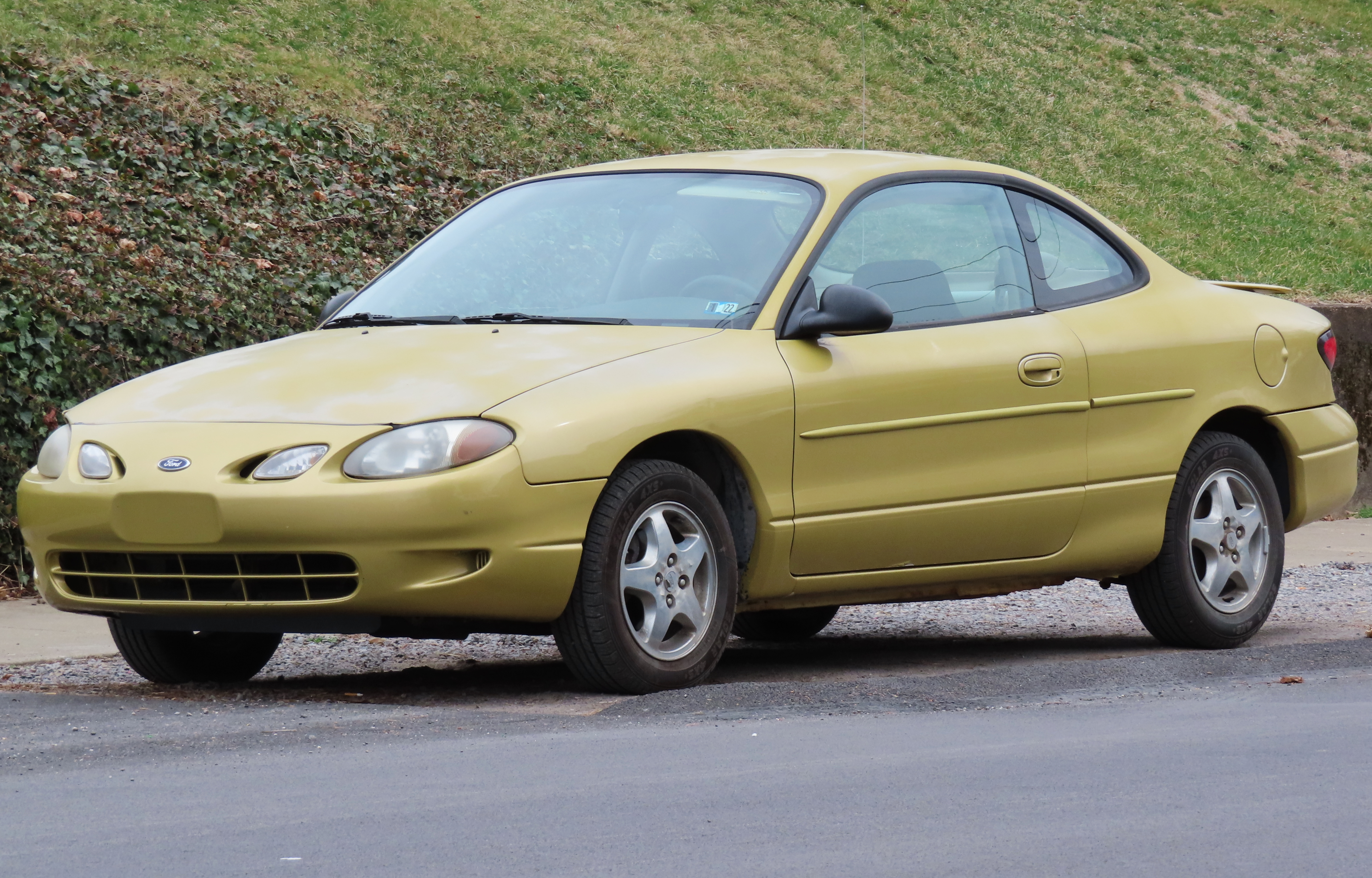

Overview
- Also called: Ford Escort ZX2
- Production: 1997–2003 (U.S.); 1997–2000 (Canada & Mexico)
- Assembly: Mexico: Hermosillo, Sonora (Hermosillo Stamping and Assembly)

Body and chassis
- Class: Sport compact
- Body style: 2-door notchback coupe
- Platform: Mazda B platform
- Related: Mazda Protegé; Mercury Tracer

Powertrain
- Engine: 2.0 L Zetec DOHC I4
- Transmission: 5-speed G5M manual; 4-speed F-4EAT automatic

Dimensions
- Wheelbase: 98.4 in (2,500 mm)
- Length: 175.2 in (4,450 mm)
- Width: 67.4 in (1,710 mm)
- Height: 52.3 in (1,330 mm)
- Curb weight: 2,478 lb (1,124 kg)

Chronology
- Predecessor: Ford Probe

For 1998, Ford released the Escort ZX2, becoming the first Escort sold as a two-door coupe. Slotted below the Mustang, the Escort ZX2 was the end result of Ford streamlining its previous line of two-door front-wheel drive coupes. Directly replacing the Escort GT, the ZX2 also served as a successor of the two-door Ford Tempo and the Ford Probe. While also marketed to younger buyers like the Ford EXP, but the new coupe was instead a four-seat vehicle. At its launch, the coupe was offered in a base "Cool" and deluxe "Hot" trims.

In spite of its height nearly matching that of the sedan (only an inch lower), the ZX2 was styled with a sleeker and rakish body, sharing only its sideview mirrors and door handles with the standard Escort. The roofline adopted a profile similar to the larger Thunderbird, styled with slimmer roof pillars. Along with slightly different taillamps, the ZX2 received 4 headlamps with a much wider lower air intake; in line with the Mercury Tracer, the ZX2 had no grille between the headlamps. While similar in appearance to the Escort sedan (including its oval control panel), the ZX2 was fitted with a distinct design for its door panels and dashboard (the latter, featuring a wedge-shaped top tier).

Sharing its chassis (and 98.4-inch wheelbase) with the Escort sedan and station wagon, the ZX2 received sport-oriented suspension tuning. In contrast to the 4-wheel disc brakes of the GT, the ZX2 used rear drum brakes (as with the sedan/wagon, ABS was an option). In addition, the ZX2 was fitted with a Zetec I4 engine, shared with the Ford Contour and Ford Focus. Though sharing an identical displacement with the SPI2000, the 130hp Zetec engine was a completely different design. Contrasting to its use in the Focus and Contour, the ZX2 version of the Zetec engine uses variable valve timing on the exhaust camshaft and more aggressive camshaft designs, allowing for higher-end power. However, the ZX2 outperforms the Focus (as a result of different gearing and lower weight). For 2003, the engine increased its torque output by 8 ft⋅lb (11 N⋅m).

During the 1999 model year, Ford released a limited-edition higher-performance ZX2 S/R (see below), intended to showcase both production and aftermarket upgrades to the ZX2. For 2000, the ZX2 revised its trims, dropping Cool and Hot, but the S/R became available. Coinciding with the move of the Escort sedan/wagon to fleet sales, the coupe was renamed the Ford ZX2. For 2003, the front fascia underwent a revision with larger intakes and the addition of a rectangular grille between the headlamps (similar to the Ford Crown Victoria).

At the end of the 2003 model year, Ford retired the ZX2, ending the Escort line in North America.

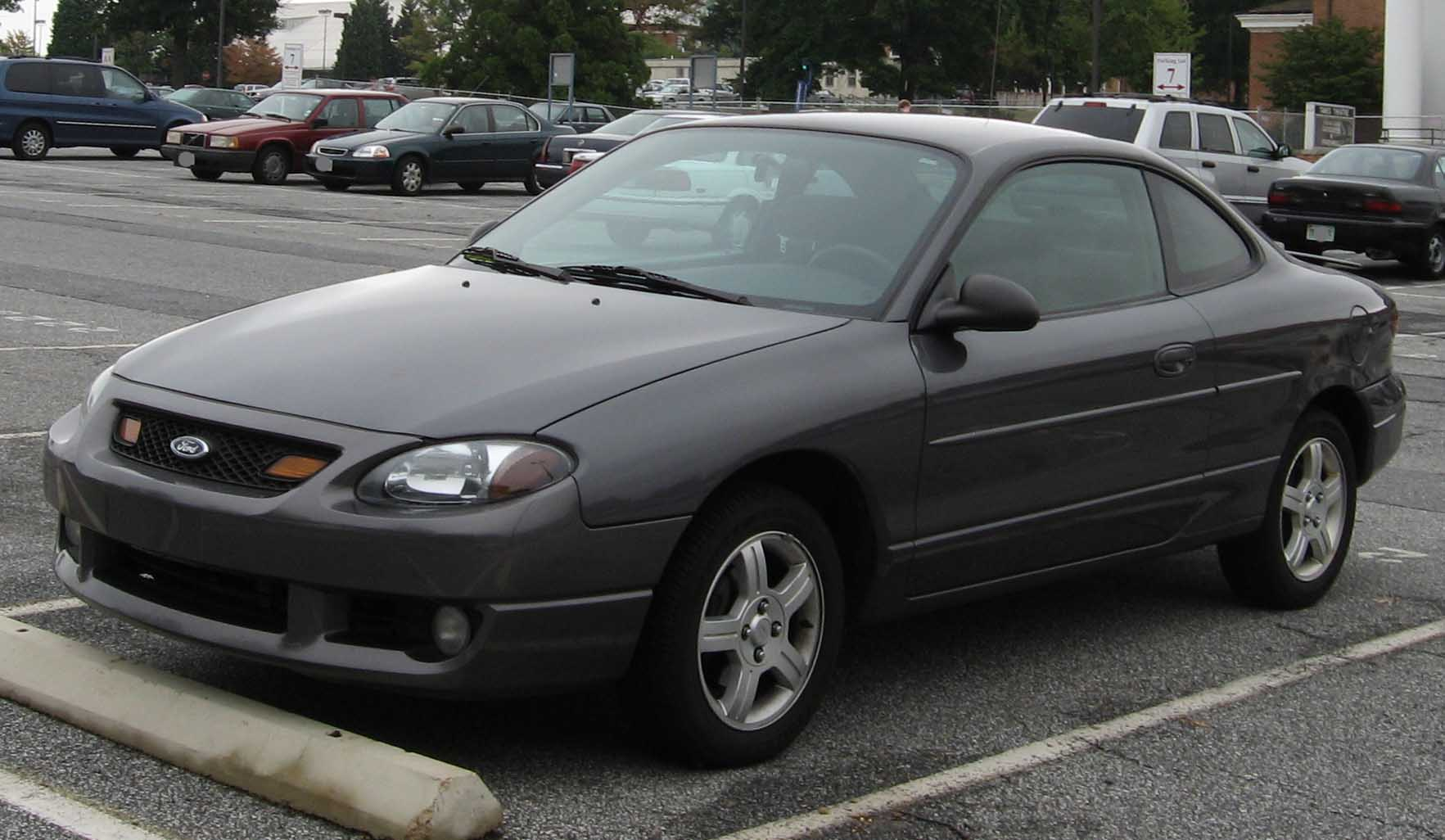
2003 Ford ZX2 (facelift model)

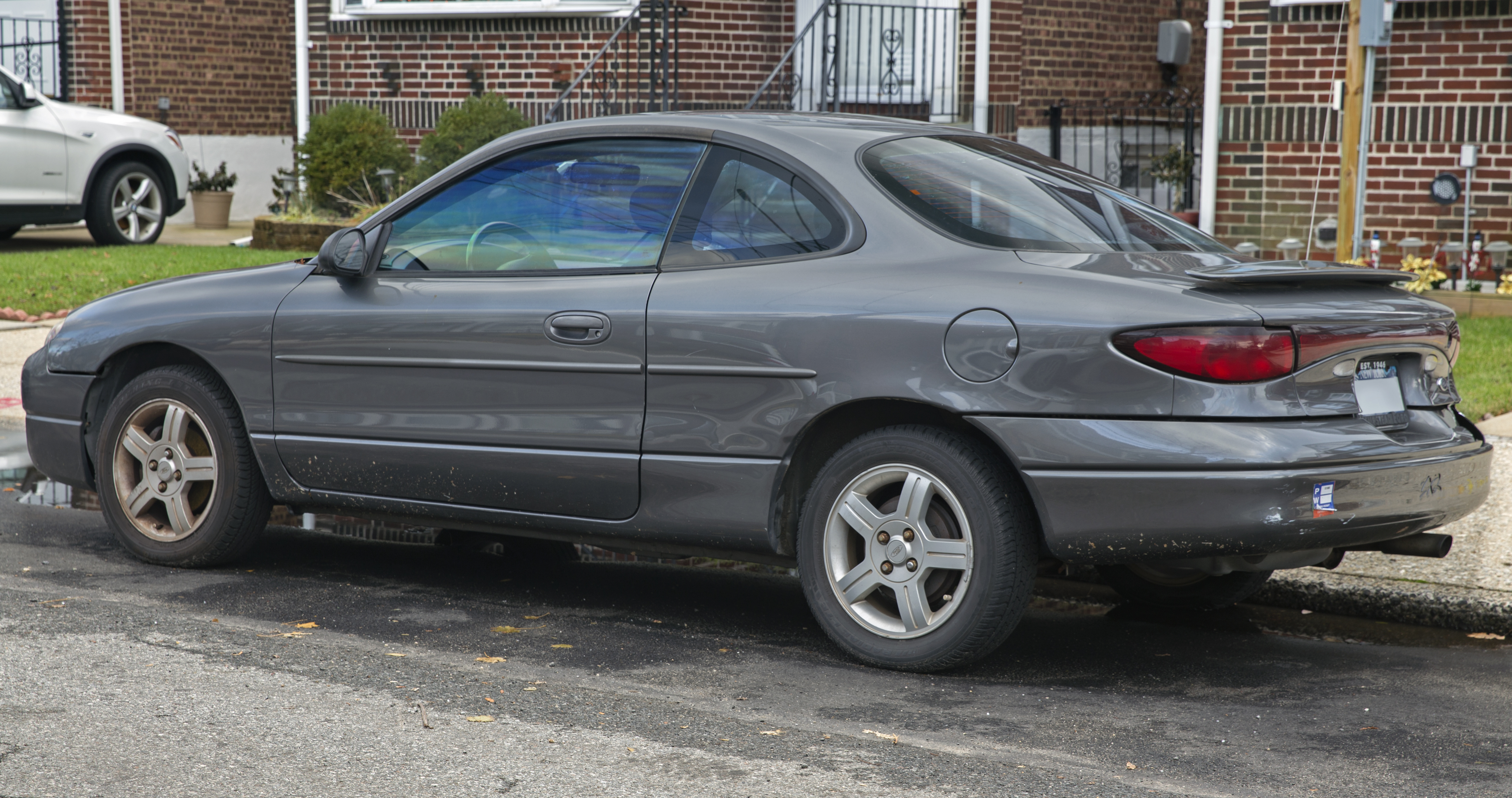
2003 Ford ZX2 SE, rear view (facelift)

===== ZX2 S/R =====
The Ford Escort ZX2 S/R (Sport/Rally) is a limited-production variant of the 1999-2000 ZX2 featuring upgraded handling and performance. The first product jointly developed by Ford Racing and Ford Motor Company's Small Vehicle Center Product Development, the ZX2 S/R debuted at SEMA's Import Auto Salon in Pomona in 1999. Inspired by factory sport compacts such as the Honda Civic Si and the Dodge Neon ACR, the S/R was a response to the increased presence and success of "tuner" models worldwide over the previous decade.

The optional S/R package added a series of both Ford and aftermarket upgrades, including stiffer suspension parts (Eibach springs (M-5560-Z2), Tokico struts (M-18000-Z2) and Energy Suspension brand polyurethane suspension bushings), more power (through a Ford Racing PCM (M-12650-Z2)), more efficient intake (Roush or Iceman), rear disc brakes (M-2300-Z2), a stronger clutch (Centerforce dual friction M-7560-Z2), a short-throw B&M manual-transmission shifter (M-7210-Z2), an S/R-unique shift knob (M-7213-Z2) and boot (M-7277-Z2), upgraded seats, a unique blue valve cover, a different speed cluster that goes up to 150 mph (240 km/h) and a unique tire and wheel package. Some S/Rs went out of the assembly plant without some of the performance mods. The suspension bushings were not installed at the factory but instead packaged with the car for installation at the dealership. This also led to many cars leaving the showroom without the full complement of S/R parts.

Engine power was increased 10% over the base Zetec engine used in the ZX2 to 143 bhp (107 kW; 145 PS), courtesy of a recommended premium fuel recalibration, new air inlet system, performance PCM, improved Borla muffler and pipe (M-5230-Z2). All ZX2 S/Rs have a special "S/R" badge on the back, either silver (on a red car) or red (on a yellow or black car).

Ford's final limited production count was 2,110 units, consisting of 110 yellow S/Rs for 1999, the first two of which were sold in Columbus, Ohio, and the other 108 in California; and for 2000, 500 black, 500 red and 1,000 yellow S/Rs were sold. The upgrade price to the S/R package was $1,500 in both years. It is believed that only 35 of 2000 S/Rs were sold in Canada.

== Sales ==
Calendar year	American sales
1998	334,562
1999	260,486
2000	110,736
2001	90,503
2002	51,857
2003 (ZX2 only)	25,473
2004 (ZX2 only)	1,210
