= Ghia Brezza =

Italo-American concept car

Overview
- Manufacturer: Carrozzeria Ghia
- Also called: Ford Brezza; Ford Escort Brezza
- Production: 1982
- Assembly: Italy: Turin
- Designer: Marilena Corvasce

Body and chassis
- Class: Sportscar
- Body style: 2-door coupé
- Layout: Transverse M/R
- Platform: Ford Escort
- Related: Ford EXP

Powertrain
- Engine: 1.6 L I4; 1.8 L I4 (supercharged)
- Transmission: 3-speed ATX/FLC automatic

Dimensions
- Wheelbase: 91 in (2,311 mm)
- Length: 157 in (3,988 mm)
- Width: 65 in (1,651 mm)
- Height: 48 in (1,219 mm)

The Ghia Brezza is a concept car commissioned by Ford and built by Carrozzeria Ghia. The car, whose name means "breeze" in Italian, is based on Ford's EXP 2-seater coupé. The Brezza is the first complete car designed by a female designer. It did not reach production.

== History ==
In 1982 Ford shipped two EXP chassis to their Ghia design studio in Turin, with instructions to create a mid-engined car as a possible answer to the anticipated arrival of the P-car under development at General Motors' Pontiac division, which came to market as the Fiero.

Ghia's managing director, Filippo Sapino, assigned Marilena Corvasce to the project. Corvasce had been brought onto Ghia's staff by Giorgetto Giugiaro fifteen years earlier, and of the four designers there at the time, she was the only woman. She earned a reputation as a talented and focused designer, and was given the Brezza project because of her ability and experience. It became the first car designed from start to finish by a woman. Because of this the Brezza was given the Historic Vehicle Association's HVA Heritage Award.

The Brezza debuted at the 1982 Turin Auto Show. After that it went on display at Six Flags Autoworld, alongside the AC Ghia, Megastar, and Probe IV, on July 4, 1982.

In October 1985, Popular Mechanics magazine put the Brezza on its cover as an example of the future of aerodynamic automobile design.

== Features ==
The Brezza is a mid-engined two-seater coupé with glassed-in rear flying buttresses. The body created by Corvasce is an aerodynamic exercise, with flush-mounted windows, skirted rear wheels, fairings in the lower nose ahead of the wheels, and a fully-ducted radiator whose airflow comes in through a slot under the nose and is extracted by the airflow under the car. The result is a coefficient of drag ($\scriptstyle C_\mathrm d\,$) of just 0.30.

Ghia created the Brezza's chassis out of the two EXPs supplied by Ford. One donor car's chassis was cut just ahead of the rear axle line, and the section removed was replaced by a portion of the other car's chassis that had been cut just behind the front axle line. The short front section with powertrain was welded onto the back of the other chassis. What had been steering rods were replaced with tie rods attached to the chassis, and the powertrain module in the front of the hybrid assembly was removed.

The car's original engine was the EXP's standard 1.6 L Ford CVH engine making 71 hp (53 kW) at 4600 rpm and 89 lb⋅ft (121 N⋅m) at 3000 rpm mated to a 3-speed ATX automatic transmission. The engine was later upgraded to a supercharged 1.8 L CVH, while the automatic transmission was retained.
