= Ford Taurus SHO =

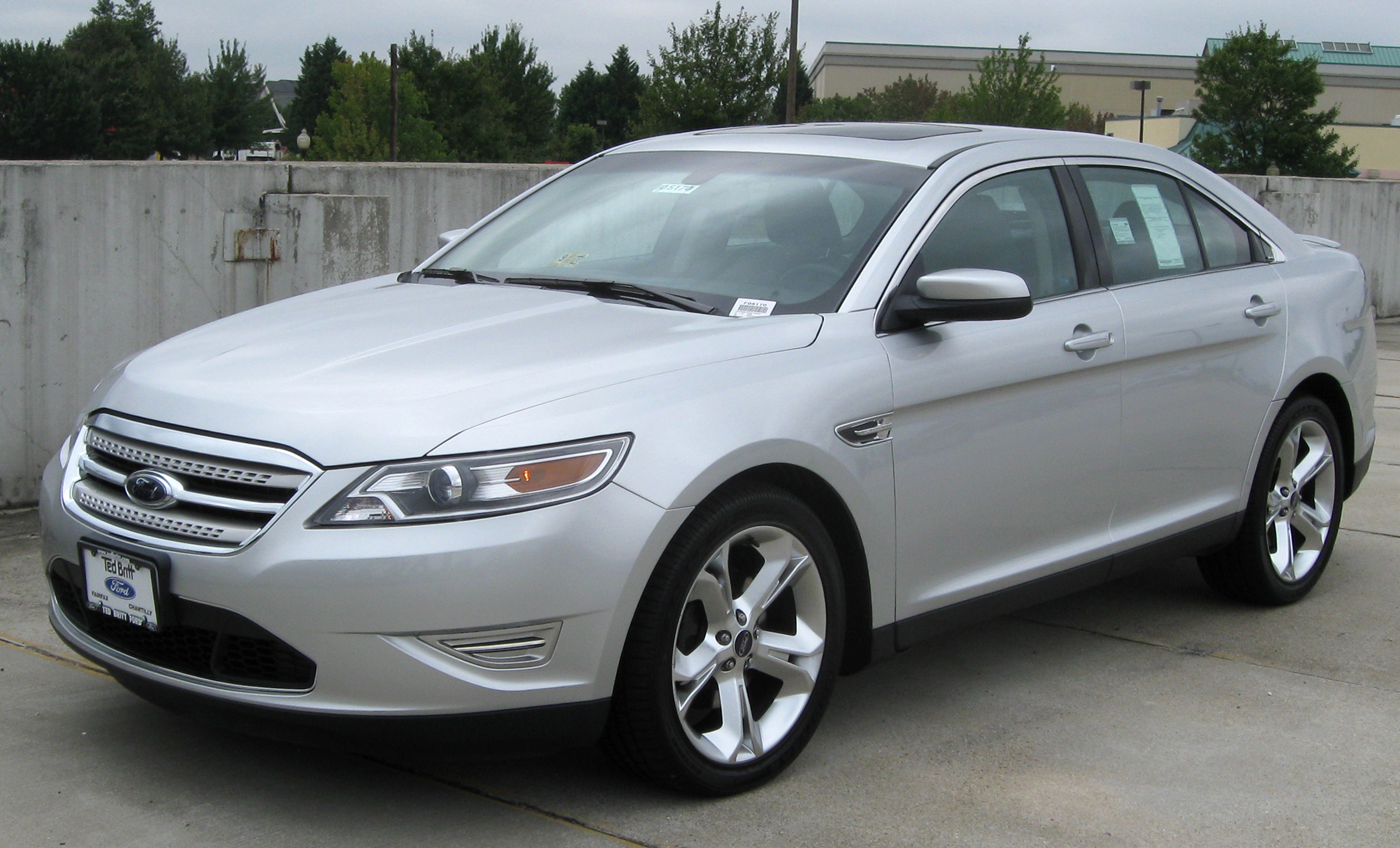

Overview
- Manufacturer: Ford
- Model years: 1989–1999; 2010–2019
- Designer: Jack Telnack

Body and chassis
- Class: Mid-size (1988–1999); Full-size (2010–2019)
- Layout: Front-engine, FWD (1989–1999); Front-engine, AWD (2010–2019)
- Related: Ford Taurus

The Ford Taurus SHO (Super High Output, commonly pronounced Taurus Sho (/ˈʃoʊ/)) is the high-performance variant of the Ford Taurus. Originally intended as a limited-production model, the SHO was produced for the first three generations of the model line, from the 1989 to the 1999 model years. After an 11-year hiatus, the name was revived for 2010, and continued in use until the 2019 discontinuation of the Taurus model line.

In contrast with standard versions of the Taurus, the Taurus SHO did not have a Mercury Sable counterpart; however, the 2010–2019 SHO served as the basis for the Ford Police Interceptor Sedan (replacing the long-running Ford Crown Victoria Police Interceptor). The final version is the only Taurus ever offered with the twin-turbocharged EcoBoost V6 engine.

The first three generations of the SHO were assembled at Atlanta Assembly (Hapeville, Georgia); the fourth generation was assembled at Chicago Assembly (Chicago, Illinois).

== Background ==
In 1984, executives of the Yamaha Motor Corporation signed a contract with the Ford Motor Company to develop, produce, and supply a compact 60° DOHC V6 engine based upon the existing Vulcan engine for transverse application.

There has been some confusion about the original intended use of the engine. It was thought this engine was first intended to power a mid-engine sports car, that project (known internally as GN34) was canceled. Patents have been found and pictures of prototype SHO powerplants installed in the Taurus show that the original intent was for the larger FWD setup and the GN34 would have come later. There were a few GN34 prototypes produced, most with standard Vulcan engines and a few other factory swaps, a SHO Ranger being one.

== First generation (1989–1991) ==
First generation
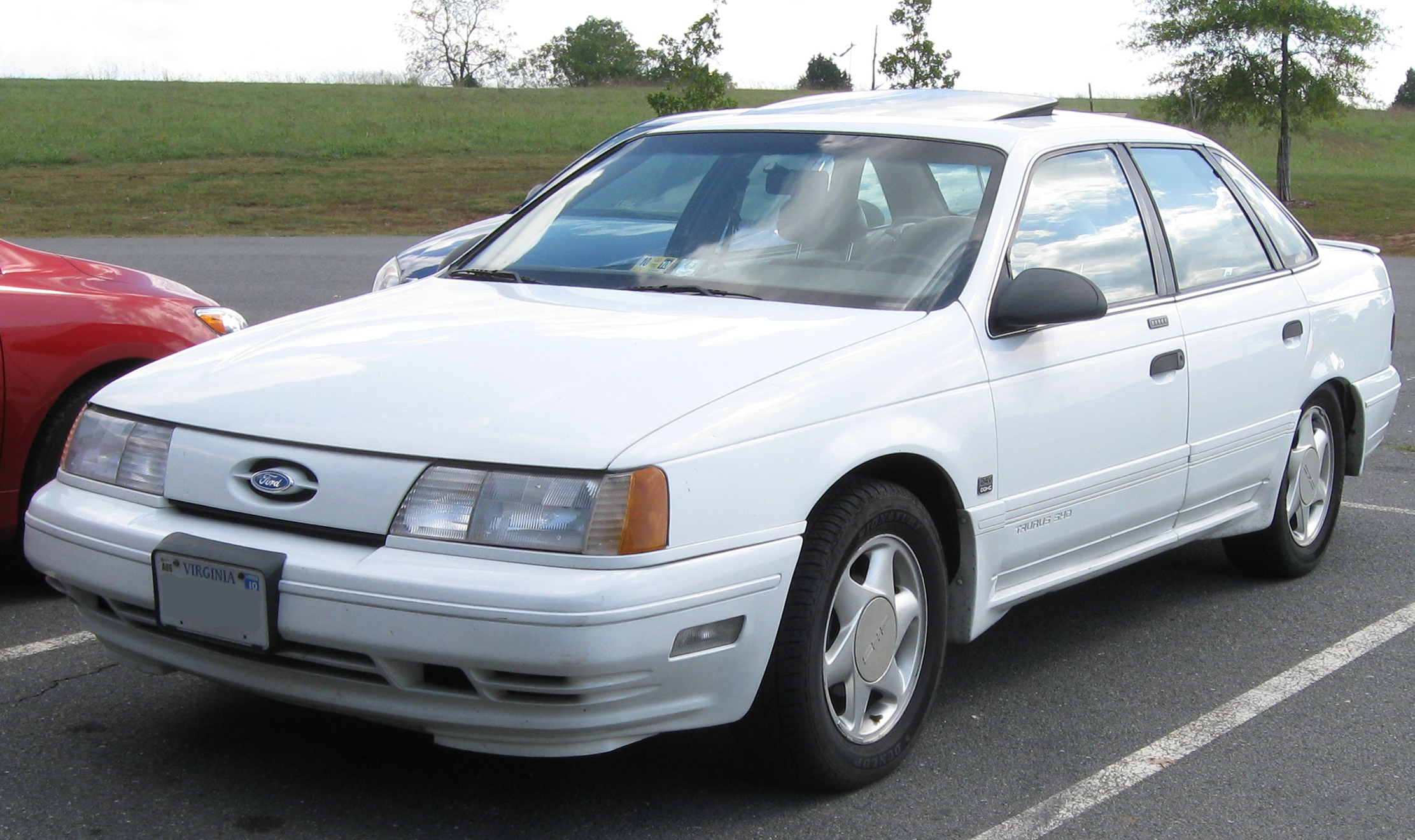

Overview
- Model years: 1989–1991
- Assembly: Hapeville, Georgia (Atlanta Assembly)

Body and chassis
- Body style: 4-door sedan
- Platform: Ford DN5 platform
- Related: Ford Taurus; Mercury Sable

Powertrain
- Engine: 3.0 L SHO V6
- Transmission: 5-speed MTX-IV manual

Dimensions
- Wheelbase: 106.0 in (2,692 mm)
- Length: 188.4 in (4,785 mm)
- Width: 70.8 in (1,798 mm)
- Height: 54.1 in (1,374 mm)
- Curb weight: 3,285 lb (1,490 kg)

The SHO differed from the normal Taurus on the exterior by having a Mercury Sable hood, different bumpers, side cladding, and fog lamps. The interior also differed, with sports seats and an 8000 rpm tachometer. The SHO had a 220 hp (160 kW) Yamaha-built V-6 engine that redlined at 7,000 RPM and became the only Taurus to feature a manual transmission since the 4-cylinder MT-5 was discontinued in that year. The transmission was designed and manufactured by Mazda and had the following gear ratios with a final drive ratio of 3.74:

Taurus SHO Manual Transmission Gear Ratios
Gear	Ratio	mph per 1,000 rpm	Max Speed (mph) @ 7000 rpm
1st	3.21	6.2	44
2nd	2.09	9.5	67
3rd	1.38	14.5	101
4th	1.02	19.6	137
5th	0.74	26.8	143 @ 5350

The first generation Taurus SHO can accelerate from 0-60 mph in 6.6 seconds with a quarter mile time of 15.0-15.2 seconds. Car and Driver reported a top speed of 143 mph (230 km/h) in their December 1989 issue.

A special edition of the SHO called the Plus package became available in late 1990. It came as part of option package #212A and contained different styling cues from the standard SHO, including a plastic 'Power Bulge' hood, chrome window trim, a plastic spoiler without the 3rd brake light, body colored stripe in the lower cladding, black mirrors, black B and C pillars, rod shifter upgrade, and a body color TAURUS badge. There were also some SHOs that came with only part of the package options known in the community as a 'partial plus', but these were really only regular SHOs that received the other options because Ford needed to use up what they had with the body change coming in 1992. White painted Pluses had the option of white painted "slicer" wheels. 1991 was the only year that a "Mocha Frost" color option was offered. Also that year, "Deep Jewel Green Clearcoat Metallic" was available, but only with the Plus option.

== Second generation (1992–1995) ==
Second generation
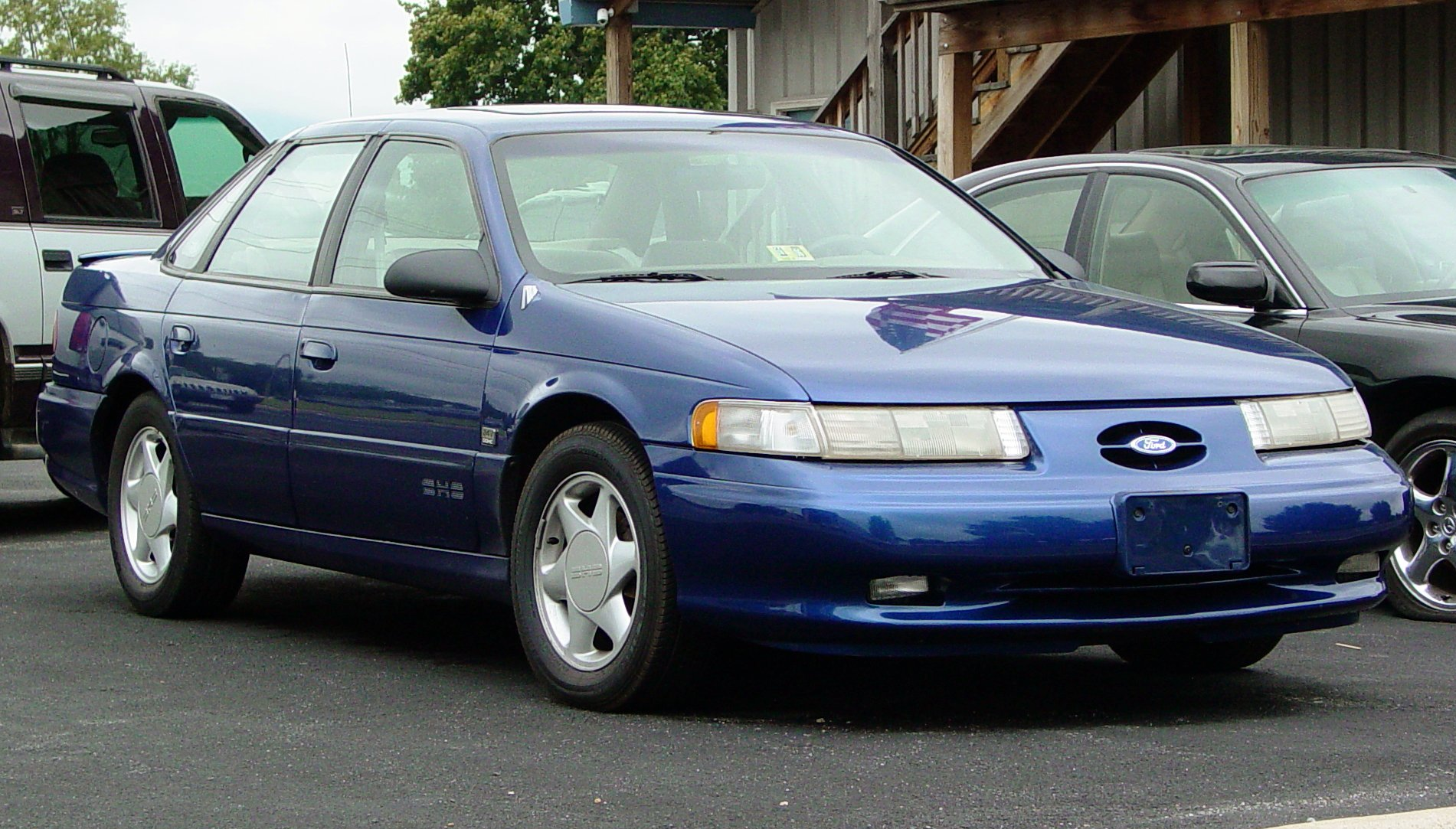

Overview
- Model years: 1992–1995
- Assembly: Hapeville, Georgia (Atlanta Assembly)

Body and chassis
- Body style: 4-door sedan
- Platform: Ford DN5 platform
- Related: Ford Taurus; Mercury Sable

Powertrain
- Engine: 3.0 L SHO V6; 3.2 L SHO V6
- Transmission: 4-speed AX4S automatic 5-speed MTX-IV manual

Dimensions
- Wheelbase: 106.0 in (2,692 mm)
- Length: Sedan:192.0 in (4,877 mm)
- Width: 71.2 in (1,808 mm)
- Height: Sedan: 54.1 in (1,374 mm)–55.4 in (1,407 mm)
- Curb weight: MTX: 3,309 lb (1,501 kg) - 3,395 lb (1,540 kg); ATX: 3,450 lb (1,560 kg) - 3,505 lb (1,590 kg)

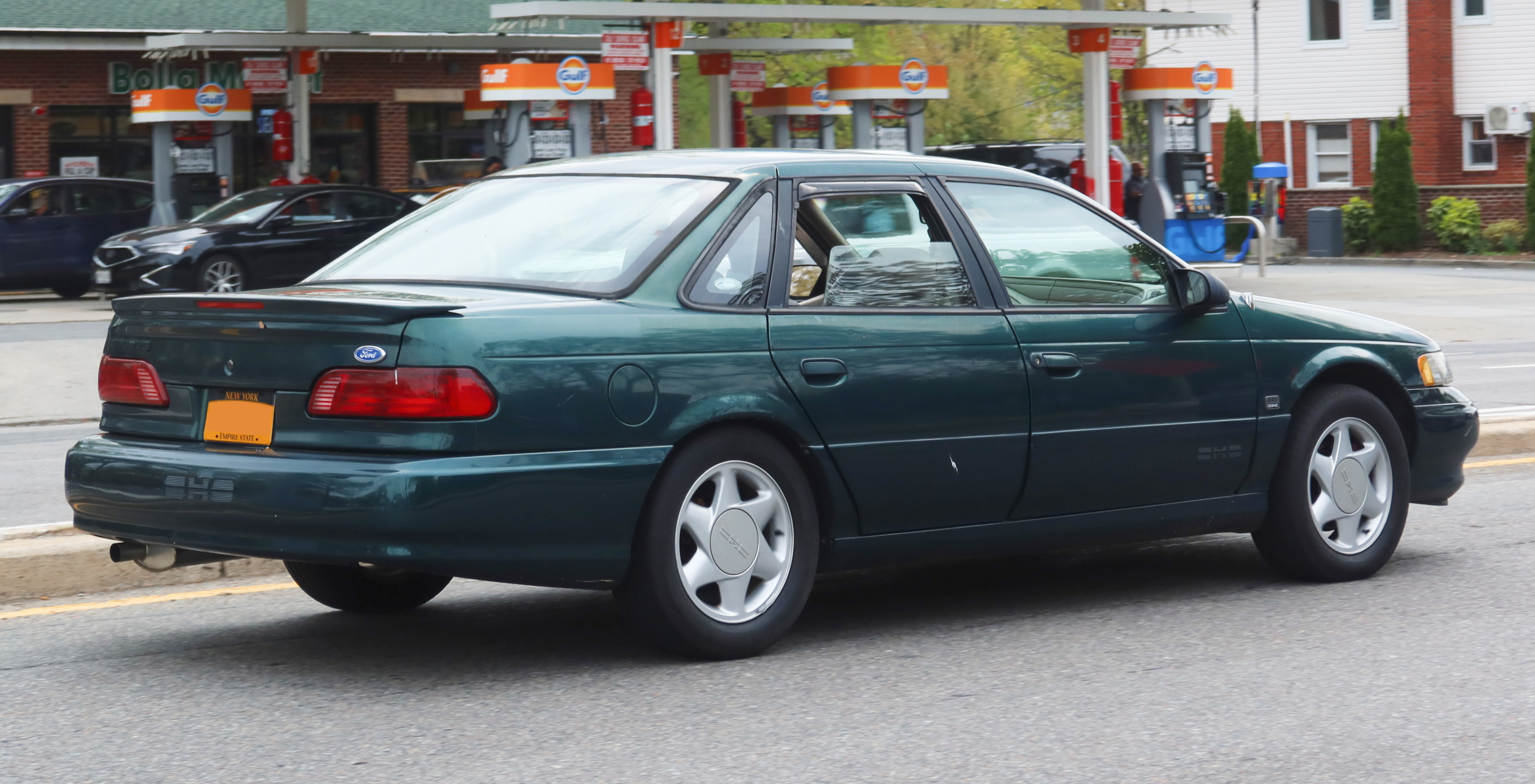
1995 Ford Taurus SHO

The SHO was redesigned for 1992, although it continued with the same Yamaha-built V-6 engine and 5-speed manual transmission. The second generation SHO utilized the Mercury Sable's front fenders, hood, and headlights with a different bumper, fog lamps, and no middle lightbar. The SHO also got unique seats, side cladding, dual exhaust, as well as a unique rear bumper. 1992 models can be visually identified by not containing a rear trunklid spoiler, having downturned exhaust tips, and only a driver's side airbag (later models have both driver's and passenger airbags). For the 1993 model year, the rear brakes on the SHO were converted to solid discs, replacing the vented discs of almost identical dimensions that were used in the 1989–1992 model years.

The lack of an automatic transmission hampered sales, a situation that Ford rectified for model year 1993. A 3.2 L version of the Ford SHO V6 engine was introduced for the automatic-equipped SHO, which still had 220 hp (164 kW), but now boasted 215 lb⋅ft (292 N⋅m), a 15 lb⋅ft (20 N⋅m) increase over the 3.0 L version. It was later discovered by enthusiasts that Ford had put less aggressive intake camshafts in the 3.2L motor to maintain the same horsepower rating as the 3.0L, while still having more torque. The 1993 to 1995 automatics use the AX4S (previously named AXOD-E) transmission with these ratios:

Gear	Ratio
1st	2.771
2nd	1.543
3rd	1.000
4th	0.694
Reverse	2.263

For MY 1993, Ford did a minor redesign of the SHO interior, updating the center console. Other changes for 1993 included a trunklid spoiler, with integrated center high mount stop lamp, and "Italian" or directional Slicer wheels. With the addition of Italian slicers the SHO now had right and left specific wheels.

The 94-95 model years featured very subtle changes. They no longer came with chrome trim around the windows, the door handles were now painted body color, and black was no longer offered as an interior or exterior color.

By request of Car and Driver magazine, a SHO station wagon was created by the Car and Driver staff with the help of Ford engineers. They started with a production Taurus wagon, and from there installed SHO bodywork, including its unique front end. They then replaced the stock engine and drivetrain with SHO drivetrain. Inside, the interior was replicated of that of a high spec SHO sedan, including its sport seats, steering wheel, and included most of the SHO's equipment. The staff then tested it, and took it on a cross country trip. The Car and Driver staff as well as Ford admitted that the SHO wagon was created "just for fun", and was never meant to be a serious production vehicle, though a second example was built, and used for brake testing. Rear tire clearance was a primary hindrance for a production version, with Ford unable to justify the modification of the rear body shell.

This generation of SHO has become prominent in American pop culture due to comedian Conan O'Brien using a green 1992 model that he personally owns in a number of comedy sketches. He would later facetiously claim to be the main influence behind Ford's decision to revive the model in a 2009 sketch when he "reviewed" the 2010 SHO with a Ford employee.

== Third generation (1996–1999) ==
Third generation
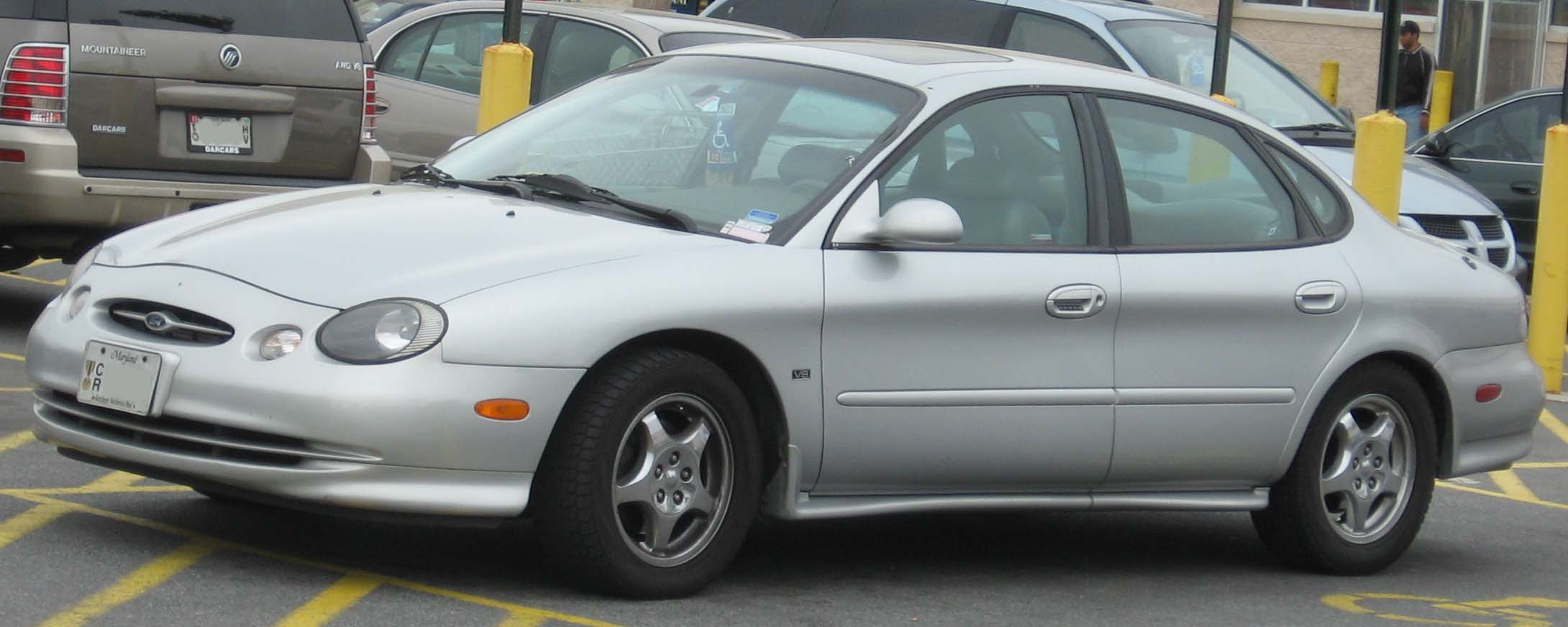

Overview
- Model years: 1996–1999
- Assembly: Hapeville, Georgia (Atlanta Assembly)

Body and chassis
- Body style: 4-door sedan
- Platform: Ford DN101 platform
- Related: Ford Windstar; Ford Taurus; Mercury Sable

Powertrain
- Engine: 3.4 L SHO V8
- Transmission: 4-speed AX4N automatic

Dimensions
- Wheelbase: 108.5 in (2,756 mm)
- Length: 197.5 in (5,016 mm)
- Width: 73.0 in (1,854 mm)
- Height: 55.1 in (1,400 mm)
- Curb weight: 3,329 lb (1,510 kg)

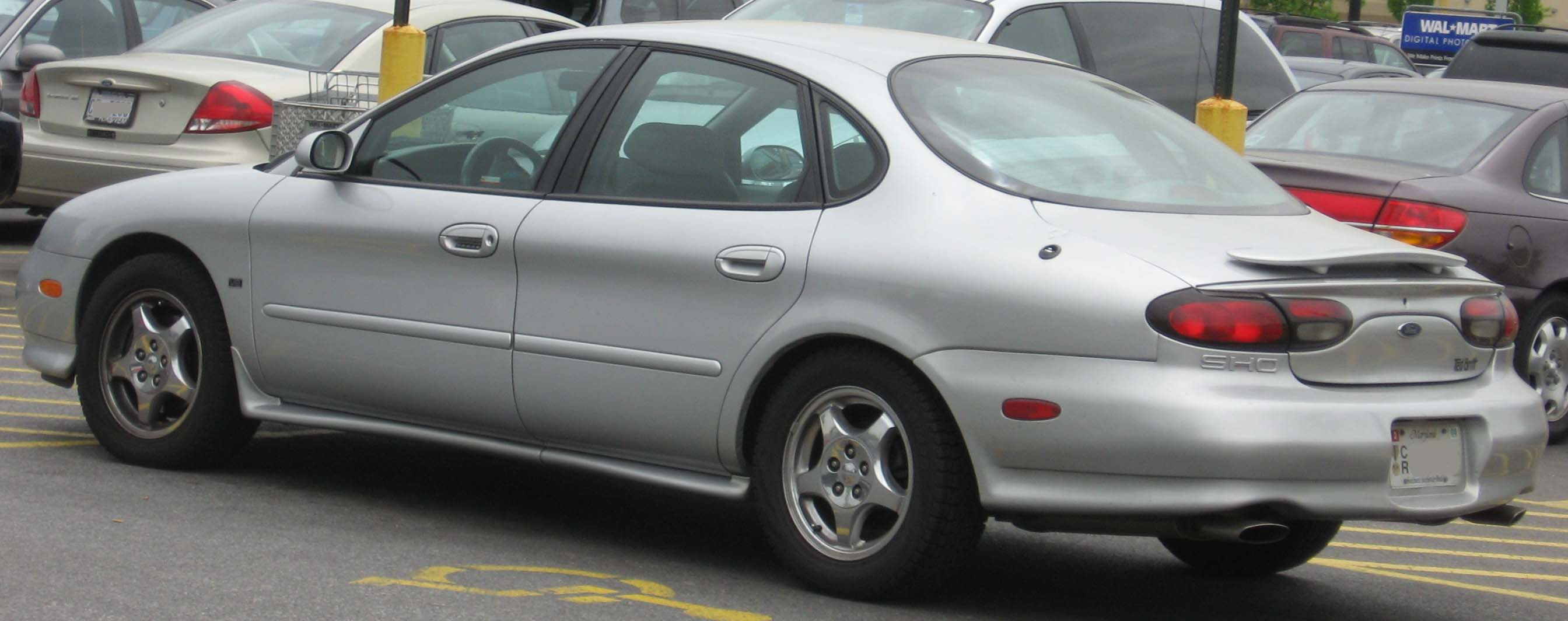
Ford Taurus SHO rear

For 1996, the SHO was redesigned, following the Ford Taurus (third generation) design. Unlike its predecessors, this SHO was more refined and used less radical bodywork. It differed from the normal Taurus with different seats, Alloy wheels, bumpers, V8 drivetrain, as well as a wind deflector being placed on the driver's side windshield wiper, to keep it on the windshield at high speeds. This SHO model sold in lower numbers than the previous SHO generations, with sales peaking at 9,000 units in 1997. As a result, Ford cut the SHO when redesigning the Taurus for its fourth generation. It was also the only Ford Taurus generation with a V8 Engine.

=== Engine ===
Ford Taurus SHO 3.4 L V8

A 235 hp (175 kW) aluminum 3.4 L V8 engine with heads from Yamaha and block from Cosworth was specified for the SHO model, but it was given the same four speed transmission as the LX: the manual gearbox option was no longer offered on the SHO. Separation of the camshaft from its sprocket has been implicated in a growing number of engine failures, at around 50,000 miles (80,000 km). This problem can be rectified by having the camshafts welded. The number of engines with failure has been documented at about 1,200 out of about 20,000 engines. Other undocumented cases very likely exist. There was no SHO for the 2000 model year, some believed that the then President of Ford Motor Company Jac Nasser influenced the designers not to design a SHO model for he was focusing on the Premier Automotive Group that consisted of Lincoln, Jaguar, Volvo, Aston-Martin and Land Rover built under that umbrella and the SHO would detract sales to that division of Ford Motor Company.

=== Transmission ===
The 1996 and later models got the AX4N transmission, which has the same gearsets (and thus the same gear ratios) as the AX4S used in the 1993 to 1995 SHO, but had improved torque capacity and shift quality, such as 3-2 downshifts.

=== SARC system ===
As of 1996, The SHO V8 came with a Semi-Active Ride Controller, (SARC) which modified the hardness and stiffness of driving at different speeds. When energized (Lower speeds) it is full soft, when no power (fast speeds and hard braking), full hard. This included modified suspensions strut and Adaptable Assisted Steering. Each corner of the car can be in either mode and acts independently. This eliminates dive on heavy braking and drastically reduces squat on acceleration. The shock solenoids on all 4 struts and the solenoid on the ZF rack and pinion steering changes their behaviour (hard or soft) based on (independent) suspension sensors and ABS sensor based speed detection. The 1996 and 1997 models had sensors on all 4 wheels. The 1998 models only had sensors on the 2 front wheels. The SARC suspension option was deleted on the 1999 models using the same struts of the 1996–2007 (non-SHO) Taurus, but keeping the adjustable power steering option.

== Fourth generation (2010–2019) ==
Fourth generation
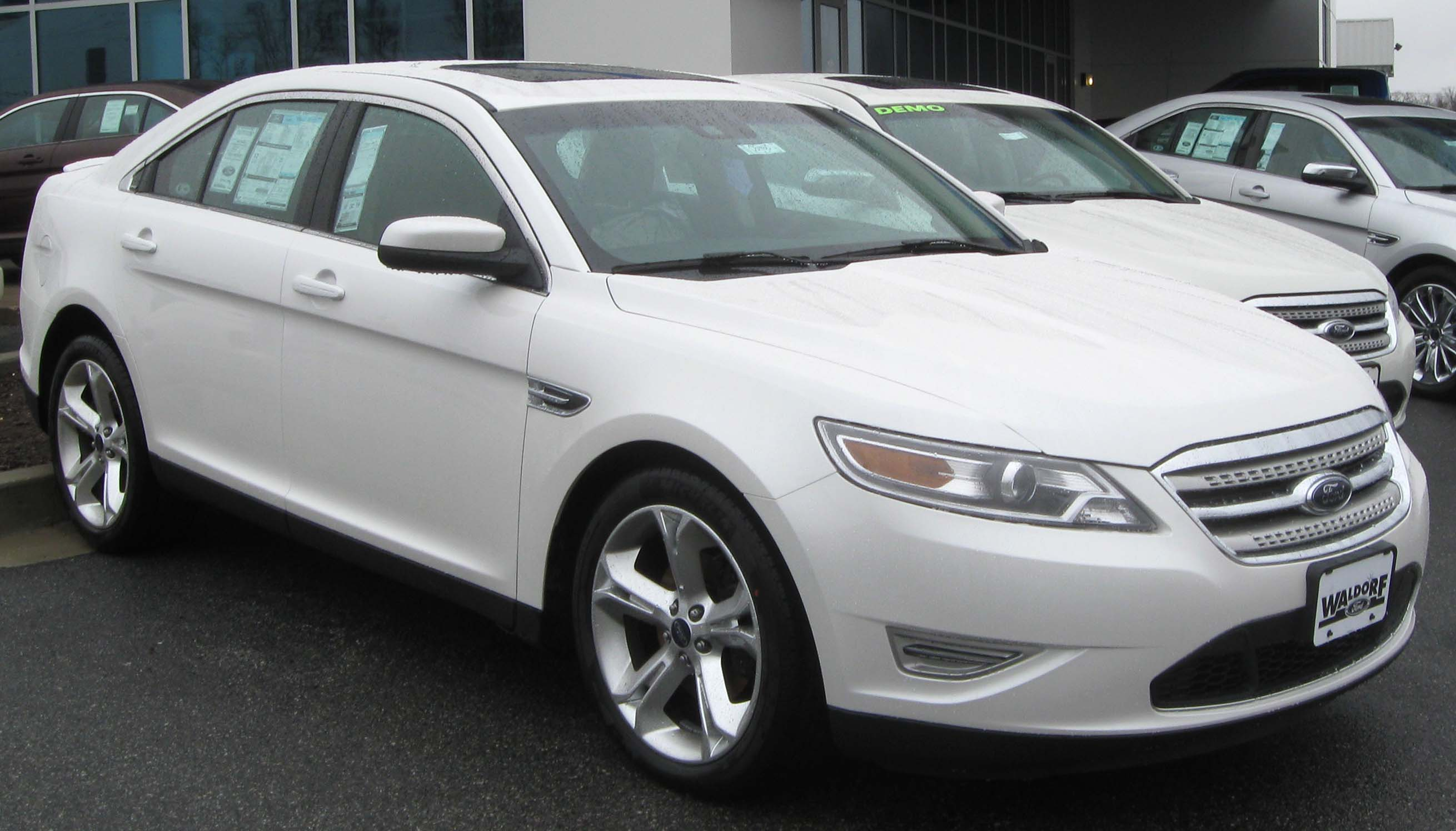

Overview
- Production: June 15, 2009–March 1, 2019
- Assembly: Chicago, Illinois (Chicago Assembly)

Body and chassis
- Body style: 4-door sedan
- Platform: Ford D3 platform
- Related: Ford Taurus; Ford Police Interceptor Sedan

Powertrain
- Engine: 3.5 L Ecoboost V6 Twin-turbo
- Transmission: 6-speed 6F55-automatic

Dimensions
- Wheelbase: 112.9 in (2,868 mm)
- Length: 202.9 in (5,154 mm)
- Width: 76.2 in (1,935 mm)
- Height: 60.7 in (1,542 mm)
- Curb weight: 4,388 lb (1,990 kg)

A month after the introduction of the sixth generation Taurus, Ford unveiled the return of the SHO at the 2009 Chicago Auto Show.

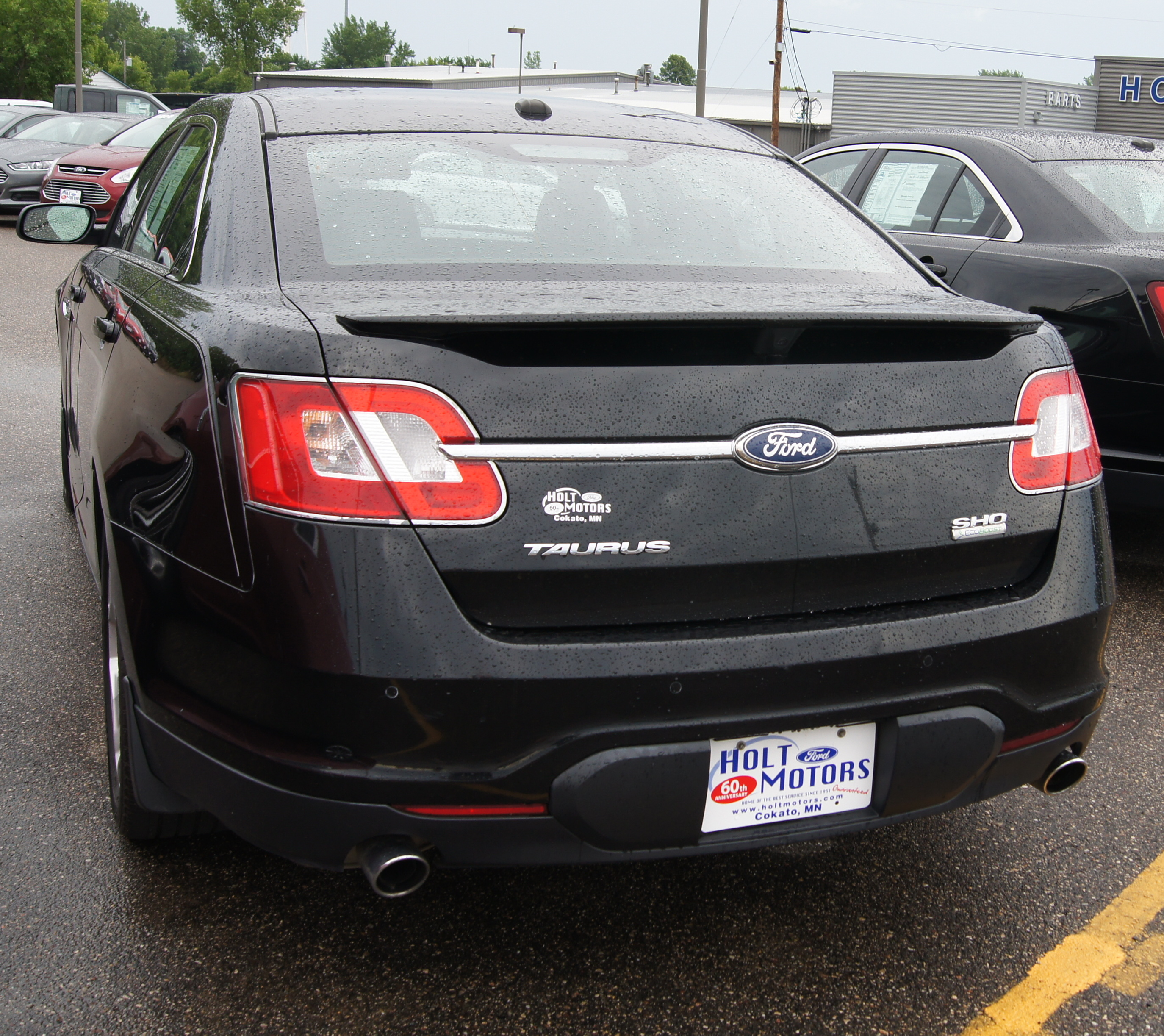
Rear view

After skipping two Ford Taurus generations, the resurrected sport sedan went on sale in the summer of 2009 as a 2010 model. In a first for the SHO nameplate, permanent GKN torque-vectoring all-wheel drive was standard. The power-plant was a 3.5L direct-injected Twin-turbo EcoBoost V6, which utilized a pair of Garrett GT1549L turbochargers and produced 365 hp (272 kW) at 5500 rpm and 350 lb⋅ft (475 N⋅m) of torque at 1500-5250 rpm. This engine was mated to Ford's 6F55 six-speed SelectShift automatic transmission with a paddle or console activated manual mode.

The fourth generation SHO came with Ford's new SR1 suspension setup with MacPherson front struts and a multi-link design in the rear. This included SHO-specific shock absorbers, springs, stabilizer bars and strut mount bushings. An optional Performance Package offered better brake pads, recalibrated steering, a "Sport Mode" for the stability control, additional cooling capacity by way of an engine oil cooler, transmission cooler, and PTU cooler; a shorter 3.16 to 1 final drive ratio, summer tires, spare tire delete, mobility kit (tire inflator with sealant), and an Alcantara wrapped steering wheel. Adaptive cruise control was not available with the Performance Package. Notably, many of the features found on the Performance Package (including the power-train) were shared with the EcoBoost version of the 2013–2019 Ford Police Interceptor Sedan.

A 2012 SHO was featured in the film Men in Black 3 as the MIB's official car.

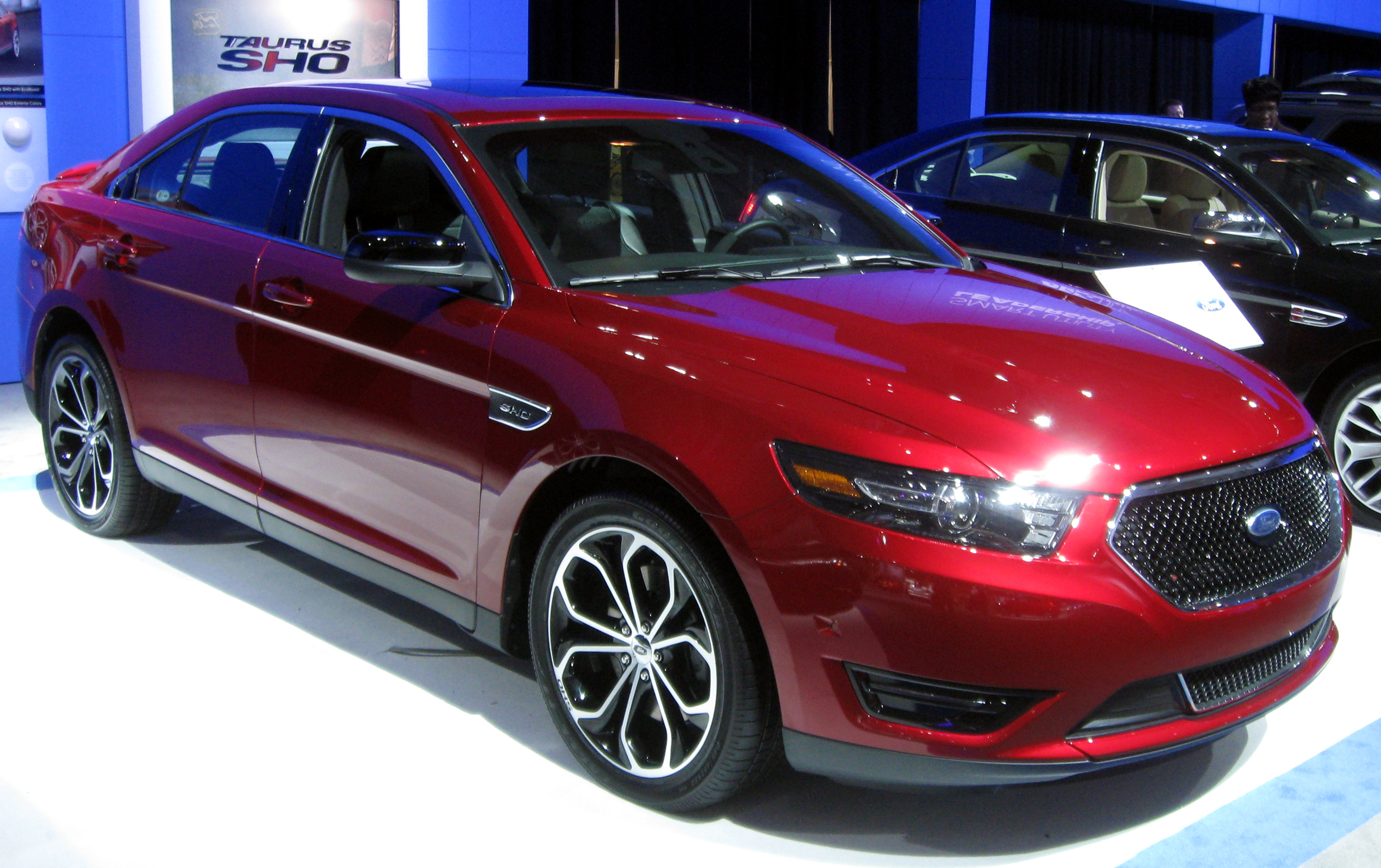

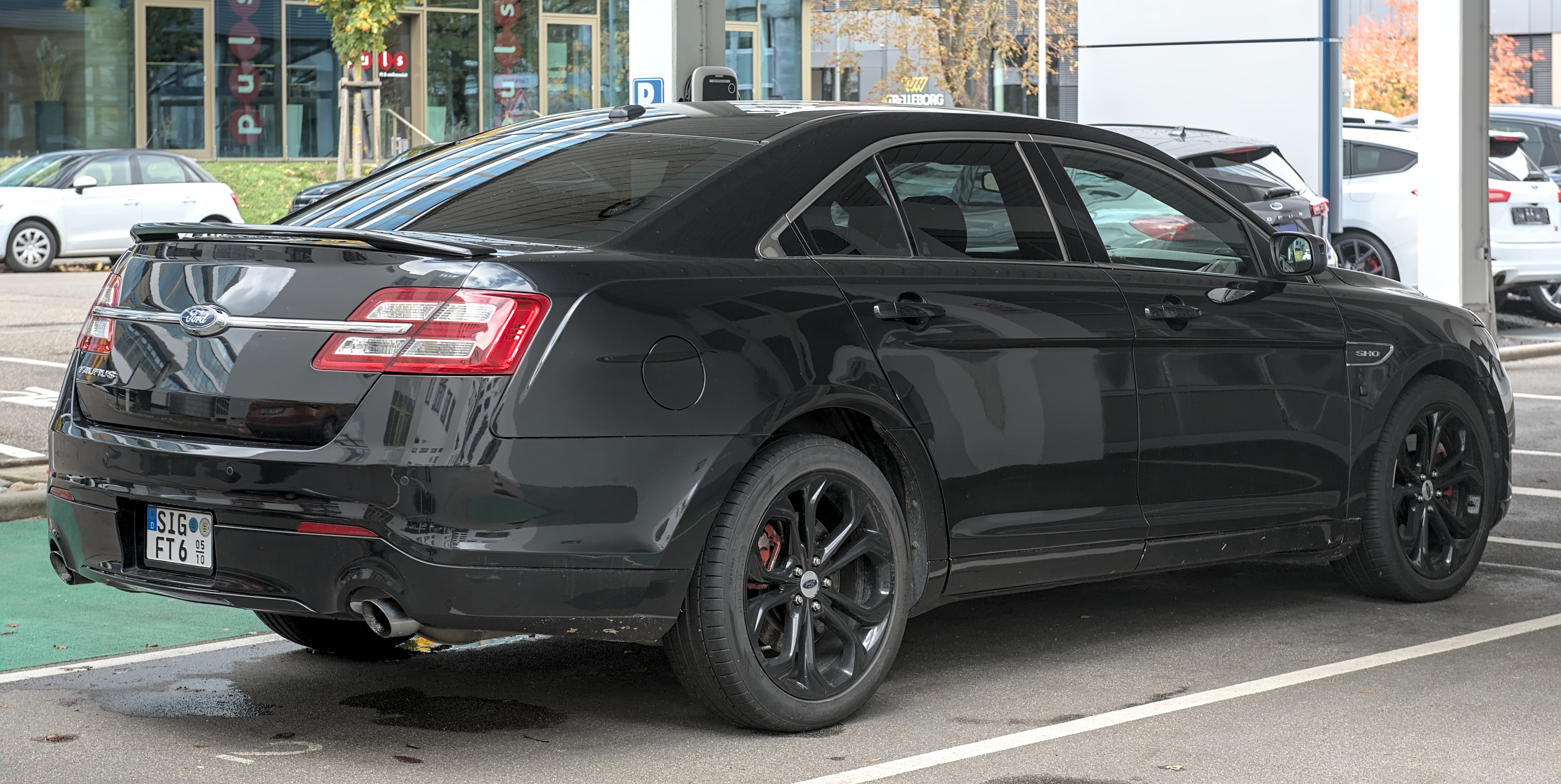
2013-2019 Ford Taurus SHO

Visually, the differences from the regular Taurus were subtle. The 2010–2012 models were even more subtle, sporting a 3-bar chrome wide-toothed grille, SHO C-Pillar logo and 5-spoked wheels. The 2013–2019 model employed a black grille with small honeycomb-shaped/mesh-like look, 19" or optional 20" "flower" design wheels with other 20" designs in later years, and SHO fender badges. They all had a SHO-specific decklid spoiler, dual polished stainless steel exhaust tips, new parking lamp bezels, and a SHO EcoBoost rear logo.

While the 4th generation SHO remained largely unchanged after 2013, 2017 brought a few light updates to the SHO. Ford SYNC 3, which featured both Apple CarPlay and Android Auto was made standard on all SHO's. A revised Sony audio system featuring ClearPhase and Live Acoustics technology was introduced as standard equipment as well. Additionally, two new 20 inch wheel choices were made available. The final update to the SHO was the deletion of the power rear sunshade for the 2019 model year. The 4th generation Taurus SHO ended production along with the rest of the Taurus line on March 1, 2019.

Gear	Ratio
1st	4.484
2nd	2.872
3rd	1.842
4th	1.414
5th	1.000
6th	0.742
Reverse	2.88
Final	2.77, 3.16 (PP)

=== Awards ===
The 2010 Taurus SHO was named Car of the Year by Esquire magazine.

== See also ==
- Ford Taurus
- Sleeper (car)
