= EVcort =

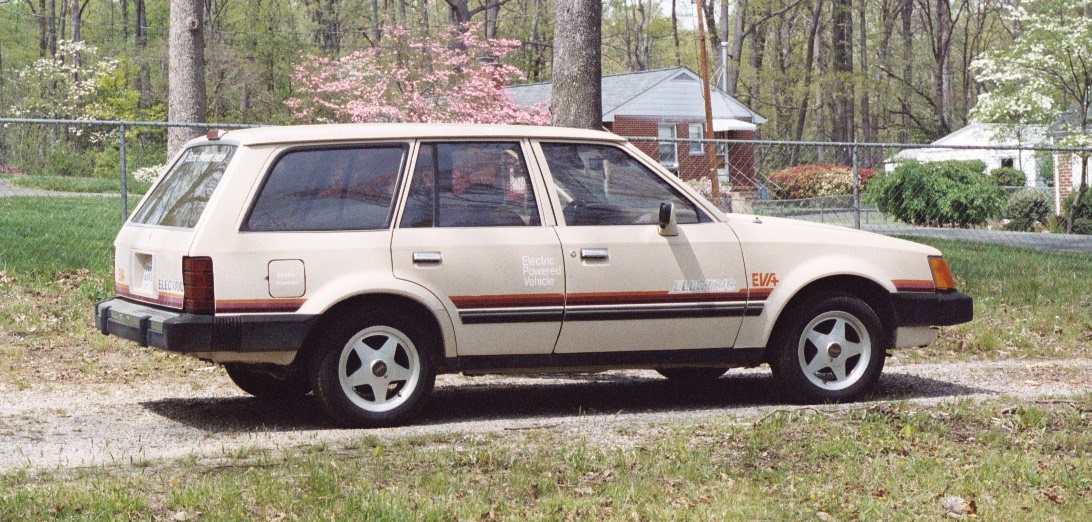
- 1988 EVA/Soleq EVcort

Overview
- Manufacturer: Electric Vehicle Associates, Soleq Corp.
- Model years: 1981-1994
- Designer: Shunjiro Ohba

Body and chassis
- Class: electric compact
- Body style: station wagon, hatchback
- Layout: FF

Powertrain
- Engine: General Electric SepEx motor
- Transmission: 4-speed manual

The EVcort was an experimental electric car produced from 1981 to 1994 by Electric Vehicle Associates of Cleveland, Ohio, and later by Soleq Corp. of Chicago, Illinois. It consisted of a stock body and transmission from the Ford Escort, refitted with an electric propulsion system, every component of which was engineered and manufactured specifically for the car. It incorporated features such as regenerative braking and a multistep charging algorithm, that are common on modern electric vehicles but were quite innovative at the time. The intent was to produce a practical alternative-fueled vehicle with performance comparable to gasoline-powered cars, but like many electric vehicles of that era, the EVcort proved far too expensive to be commercially viable. Nevertheless, it was used extensively by a variety of institutions for electric vehicle demonstration and testing programs.

== Electric Drive Train ==
The distinguishing feature of the EVcort was the use of sophisticated electronics to extract maximum efficiency from the lead-acid battery pack. All of the electronic components: controller, charger, DC/DC converter and DC/AC inverter, were designed specifically for the EVcort by Shunjiro Ohba, a PhD. electrical engineer at Soleq. The car was built under his supervision using engineless Escorts obtained directly from Ford Motor Company. Unlike other direct current (DC)-based electric vehicles of the period, which used series-wound motors, the EVcort used a separately excited (SepEx) traction motor that was built to order for the car by General Electric. This configuration allowed the inclusion of regenerative braking to maximize driving range, but required a particularly complex controller to regulate the armature and field independently. The controller was the size of a suitcase and incorporated over 300 transistors. The power circuit for the armature used 120 bipolar transistors wired in parallel, giving a maximum 400 amps or 40 kilowatts of power, with another 60 bipolar transistors for regenerative braking of up to 200 amps. By automatically weakening the field current in response to armature current at high RPM, the controller maintained high motor torque over a wide range of motor speeds, allowing the car to accelerate from a standing start to 45 mph without shifting gears. It operated at a relatively low pulse-width modulation frequency of 800 Hz, thus requiring large capacitors and chokes to filter the ripple. The traction pack consisted of eighteen 6‑volt lead-acid batteries for a total of 108 volts. Initially, standard flooded golf cart batteries were used, replaced in later models by Sonnenshein gel cells. The EVcort was a highway-capable vehicle with a top speed of approximately 70 mph.

== Accessories ==
Early EVcorts had a gasoline heater, while later models had an electric ceramic heater, as well as an air conditioner powered by an AC inverter. Power for accessories was provided by a 40‑amp DC-to-DC converter that took its 800‑Hz switching signal from the controller. The charger operated at 110 volts AC input and had a complex charging cycle, with an initial constant current that was switchable at 16, 20 or 30 amps, followed by a constant voltage ("float") that was adjustable to accommodate different battery types and compensated for seasonal temperature changes, and finally a trickle phase to maintain a full charge. Post-1990 models had a feature whereby the heater or air conditioner could be set to prewarm or precool the cabin to a specified temperature using power from the AC line once charging was complete, thus minimizing use of the batteries for climate control.

== History ==
When production began in 1980, EVA intended to produce hundreds of EVcorts for sale to the general public, but the complexity of the electronics resulted in prohibitively high production costs. By 1992, with a sale price of $58,000, the EVcort was being marketed only as a battery testing platform, rather than a general-use vehicle. Sales were therefore effectively limited to institutions such as electric utilities and government agencies. From 1988 through 1994, the United States Department of Energy sponsored many of these purchases as part of its Site Operator program to evaluate the performance of various electric vehicle designs in fleet use. In general, the EVcort performed well in these tests, receiving high marks for its reliability, but with some complaints of inadequate acceleration. Because of liability issues, it was Soleq's policy that the cars should be scrapped upon completion of testing. Nevertheless, some were eventually sold to hobbyists and as of 2011 a few remain in use, although most of the original Soleq controllers have failed and been replaced with modern high-frequency MOSFET controllers.

Also built by EVA were the re-shaped Escorts called EXP s. The EXPs have the same electric components as the EVA Escorts. Only 4 of these EVA-built EXPs are known to have existed.
