= Marilena Corvasce =

Italian automobile designer

- Born: January 15, 1947 (age 79); Alessandria, Italy
- Occupations: Artist; Automobile designer
- Notable work: Ghia Brezza

Marliena Corvasce (15 January 1947) is an Italian artist and former automobile designer. She is credited with designing the Ghia Brezza, making her the first woman to design and develop an entire automobile from start to finish.

== Early years ==
Corvasce was born in Alessandria, Italy. Her early hobbies included painting, drawing, and wood carving.

Corvasce graduated from the Accademia Albertina di Belle Arti, where she had studied under Raffaele Pontecorvo. She developed an interest in ancient Rome, as both an era and artistic style. She numbered Raphael, Michelangelo, Leonardo da Vinci, Artemisia Gentileschi, Frida Kahlo, and Gustav Klimt as artistic influences. After her graduation she spent one year at home immersed in painting and sculpting.

== Design career ==
In spring 1967, Corvasce was interviewed by Giorgetto Giugiaro, and submitted a sketch as part of the assessment. One month later she was hired by Carrozzeria Ghia as an illustrator-designer. Her responsibilities were initially confined to embellishing the company's proposals for customers, but during this early time she also acquired many other skills, including photography and darkroom techniques, and writing on ceramic.

Corvasce progressed to working as a creative stylist under Giugiaro, who was at that time a consultant to Ghia. She also met Alejandro de Tomaso, who invited her to relocate from Turin to Modena with him—an offer that she declined. Giugiaro's position at Ghia was filled by Tom Tjaarda, and during this time Corvasce's projects included designs for a snowmobile for Renzo Rivolta, the interior of Gianni Bulgari's personal aircraft, and an assortment of mopeds and motorcycles for Benelli, which was then owned by de Tomaso. Other vehicle designs that she remembers fondly was one for a large sedan, a small barchetta, and the cab of a semi-trailer truck unit.

Corvasce's design process started with the production of a copious number of sketches, which continued until she had arrived at a solution that she believed to be optimal. Her work ethic and clear artistic vision helped her acquire the experience needed to realize her concepts, and earn the trust of her employer.

Ghia's managing director, Filippo Sapino, assigned Corvasce to lead the Ghia Brezza concept project. The car was based on two Ford EXP chassis supplied to Ghia by Ford. Working with her team of modellers, Corvasce shepherded the project from conception to completion in 1982, becoming the first woman to have designed a complete car.

Her name was left out of all early press releases about the car. It was not until years later, when the Brezza was displayed at the Peterson Automotive Museum, that she received formal recognition for her work. The Brezza was given the Historic Vehicle Association's HVA Heritage Award because of Corvasce's achievement.
