= Ford EXP =

Car model

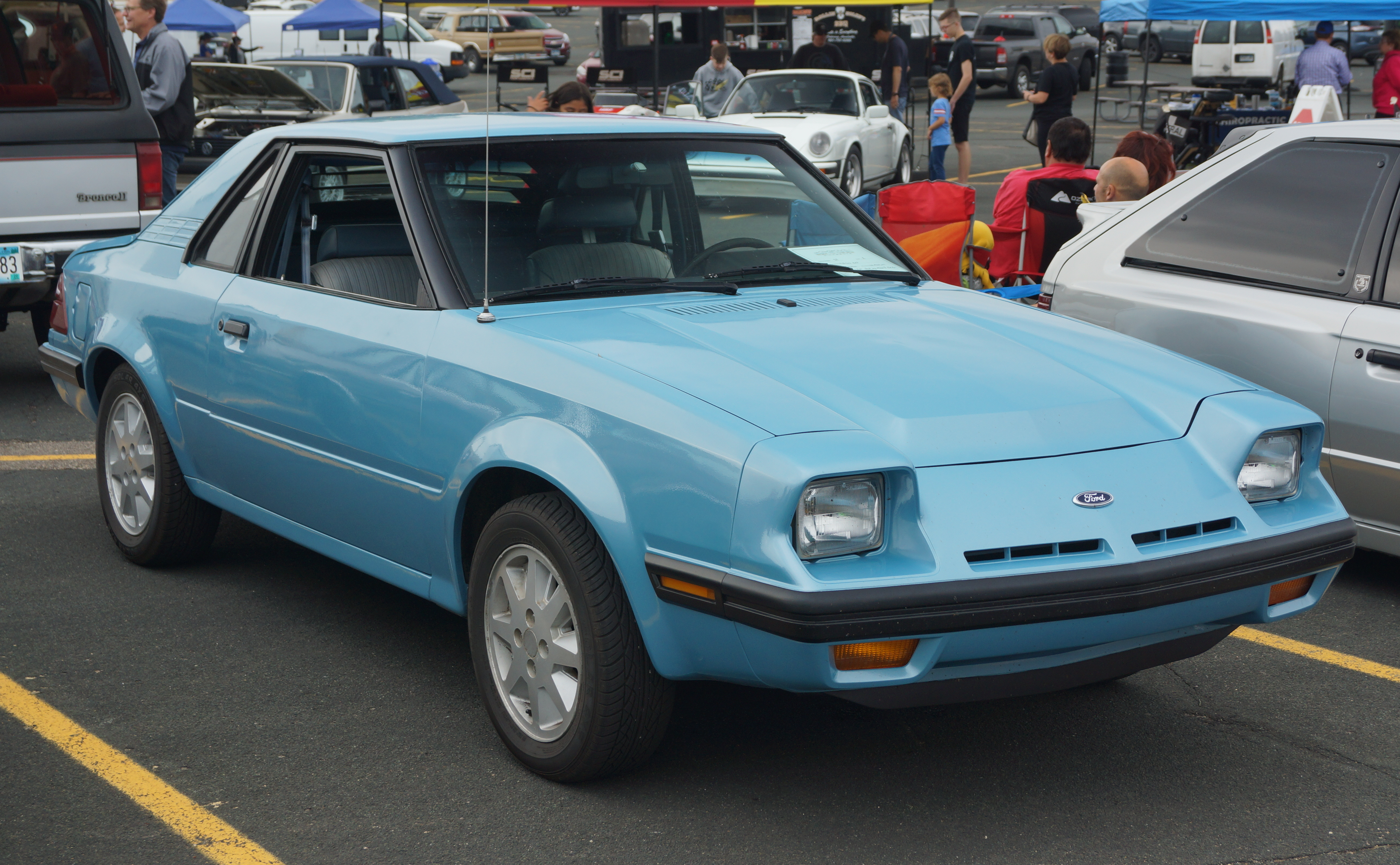
- 1982 Ford EXP

Overview
- Manufacturer: Ford
- Also called: Mercury LN7; Ford Escort EXP
- Production: February 1981 – October 1988
- Model years: 1982–1988
- Assembly: United States: Wayne, Michigan (Wayne Stamping & Assembly); United States: Milpitas, California (San Jose Assembly); Canada: St. Thomas, Ontario (St. Thomas Assembly)

Body and chassis
- Class: Compact car
- Body style: 3-door hatchback
- Layout: FF layout
- Platform: Ford Escort platform
- Related: Ford Escort / Mercury Lynx; Ford Tempo / Mercury Topaz

The Ford EXP (also called the Ford Escort EXP) is a sport compact coupe that was manufactured and marketed by the Ford Motor Company from 1982 to 1988, across two generations. The first two-seat Ford since the original Ford Thunderbird, the EXP was sold exclusively in North America. For 1982 and 1983, Mercury marketed a badge engineered variant called the LN7.

The EXP was derived from the American Ford Escort, and shared its powertrain and chassis with that car. It received model-specific front and rear fascia styling, and a new, lower coupe roofline. What would have been the rear seat area in an Escort was converted to additional cargo space. The EXP received a minor face lift during model year 1985.

After model year 1988, the EXP was discontinued.

== Development ==
The OPEC oil embargo of October 17, 1973–1974 triggered a 70% increase in oil prices, skyrocketing prices for gasoline, and long lines at filling stations. A second energy crisis and a renewed recession followed from 1979 to 1982. Automobile manufacturers rushed to develop new small, fuel efficient cars in response.

Ford began development of the front-wheel-drive Escort in the late 1970s. While originally intended to be a "world car", the North American version shared little aside from its powertrain and name with its European counterpart.

At the same time, Ford also produced a series of sporty small-car concepts, many of which were built by their Italian design studio at Carrozzeria Ghia. One such exercise is the Ghia EXP-II. Unveiled in 1981, the EXP-II was built on an Escort platform with a smooth, streamlined fastback shape. Meant to foreshadow a new class of Ford cars, the EXP-II also allowed the designers to experiment with novel surface treatments and arrangements of body features, and included some asymmetrical elements. The influence of the EXP-II is said to be visible in the EXP.

The impetus for developing the EXP came from the company's marketing research. The growing number of one- and two-person households, combined with younger buyers' desire for small sporty cars, led Ford to conclude that Americans wanted a "lively little car that is dependable, efficient, and good-looking".

Comparing the EXP to the original 1955–1957 Thunderbird, Ford Division, general manager Louis E. Latalf said, "we're introducing another two-seater with the same flair, but the EXP will be a very affordable, very fuel efficient car matched to the lifestyles of the eighties."

Development took place in Ford's St. Thomas Assembly plant in Ontario, where the majority of the EXPs and LN7s were produced, including all of both models for the 1982 and 1983 model years. This was also where ongoing experiments and further engineering took place as new technologies became available. The plant produced EXPs from February 16, 1981, to August 5, 1983, and LN7s from February 16, 1981, to June 30, 1983, ending in the 1983 model year for both cars and leaving the American plants to produce all EXPs from 1984 to 1988.

=== Name origin ===
According to an article published in Popular Mechanics, the letters EXP stand for Erika Project Personal, where project cars are designated X. "Erika" was the code-name from the European Escort.

== 1980–1981 EXP sales model ==
A few pre-production EXPs were made for conceptual design and advertisement. These rare EXPs included many features that would be available in every EXP or LN7. They were all two-tone, with vibrant colors with black painted above the door bumper-lines and black below, and had a round silver badge where Ford's blue oval would be in 1982. These models were distinguished from production models by dual vents towards the front of the hood instead of the vents later seen on the front bumper clips, an absence of bumper strips on the doors, and rear taillights that were completely red where production EXPs had black around the reverse lights. An SS package and bubbleback hatches like that of the LN7 and second generation EXPs were optional, along with black paint around the door windows as seen on second generation EXPs, aluminum oval-spoke wheels, and "1.6 L" badges on the front fenders. At least ten were built in Canada and were all featured in a rare catalog featuring only those cars.

The first production EXP and LN7 were assembled on February 16, 1981, and the first EXP was driven off the line by then Ontario Premier Bill Davis.

Ford expected to build and sell 200,000 EXPs and 70,000 LN7s in the 1982 model year, with approximately half that number making production.

== First generation (1982–1985) ==
First generation
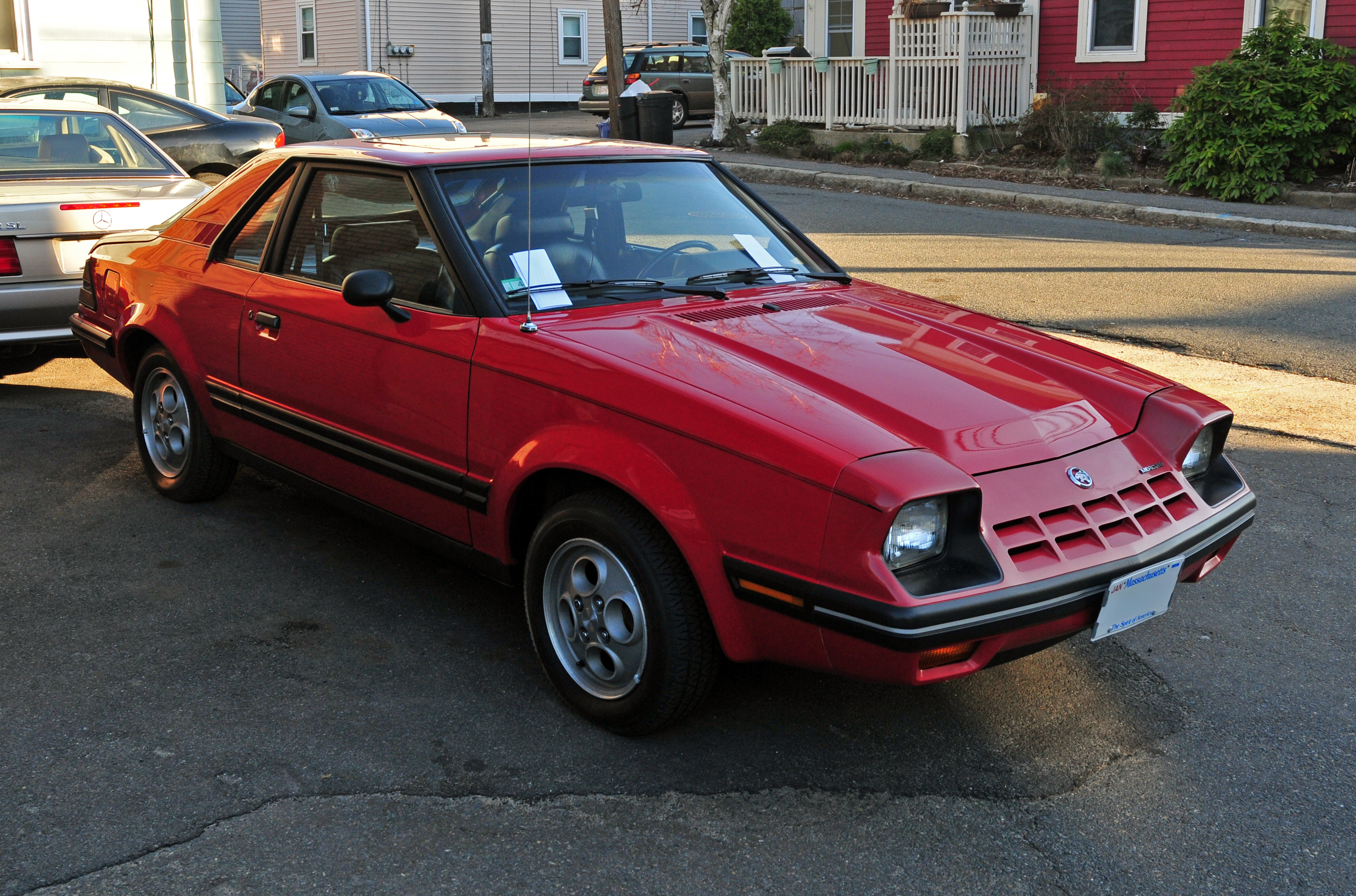
- Mercury LN7

Overview
- Model years: 1982–1985 (EXP); 1982–1983 (LN7)

Powertrain
- Engine: 1.6 L CVH I4
- Transmission: 4-speed MTX-I manual 5-speed MTX-III manual 3-speed FLC automatic

Dimensions
- Wheelbase: 94.2 in (2,393 mm)
- Length: 170.3 in (4,326 mm)
- Width: 65.9 in (1,674 mm)
- Height: 50.5 in (1,283 mm)
- Curb weight: 2,047 lb (929 kg)

The EXP shares its unibody construction, 94.2 in (2,393 mm) wheelbase, front-wheel drive, and four-wheel independent suspension with the Escort. At 50 in (1,270 mm) tall and 14 ft (4.3 m) long, the EXP is longer and lower than the North American Escort.

Performance is unremarkable, since the EXP weighs about 200 lb (90.7 kg) more than the contemporary Escort but has the same 1.6 L CVH engine rated at 70 hp (52 kW) and a standard 4-speed MTX-I manual transaxle. Originally, two engine options were planned; a 1.3 L CVH and a 1.6 L CVH, but ultimately only the larger version was offered. In Europe several CVH variants were produced, but only the 1.6 L and later 1.9 L CVH engines were used in the EXP. The engine was specifically tuned for fuel efficiency in the North American market, while European models of these engines made more power. The March 1981 issue of Car and Driver reported that an EXP with a manual transmission attained 44 mpg_{‑US} (5.3 L/100 km) on the highway.

The suspension shares nearly every part with 1980s North American Escorts.

The EXP has a sharply sloped windshield, wheel arches with prominent lips, and wide body side moldings placed just below the top of the wheel well. Its minimalist grille consists of two horizontal slots on the sloped front panel. In back, the EXP has a dog-leg hatch with flat glass similar to that on the Mustang. The body's coefficient of drag ($\scriptstyle C_\mathrm d\,$) is 0.37.

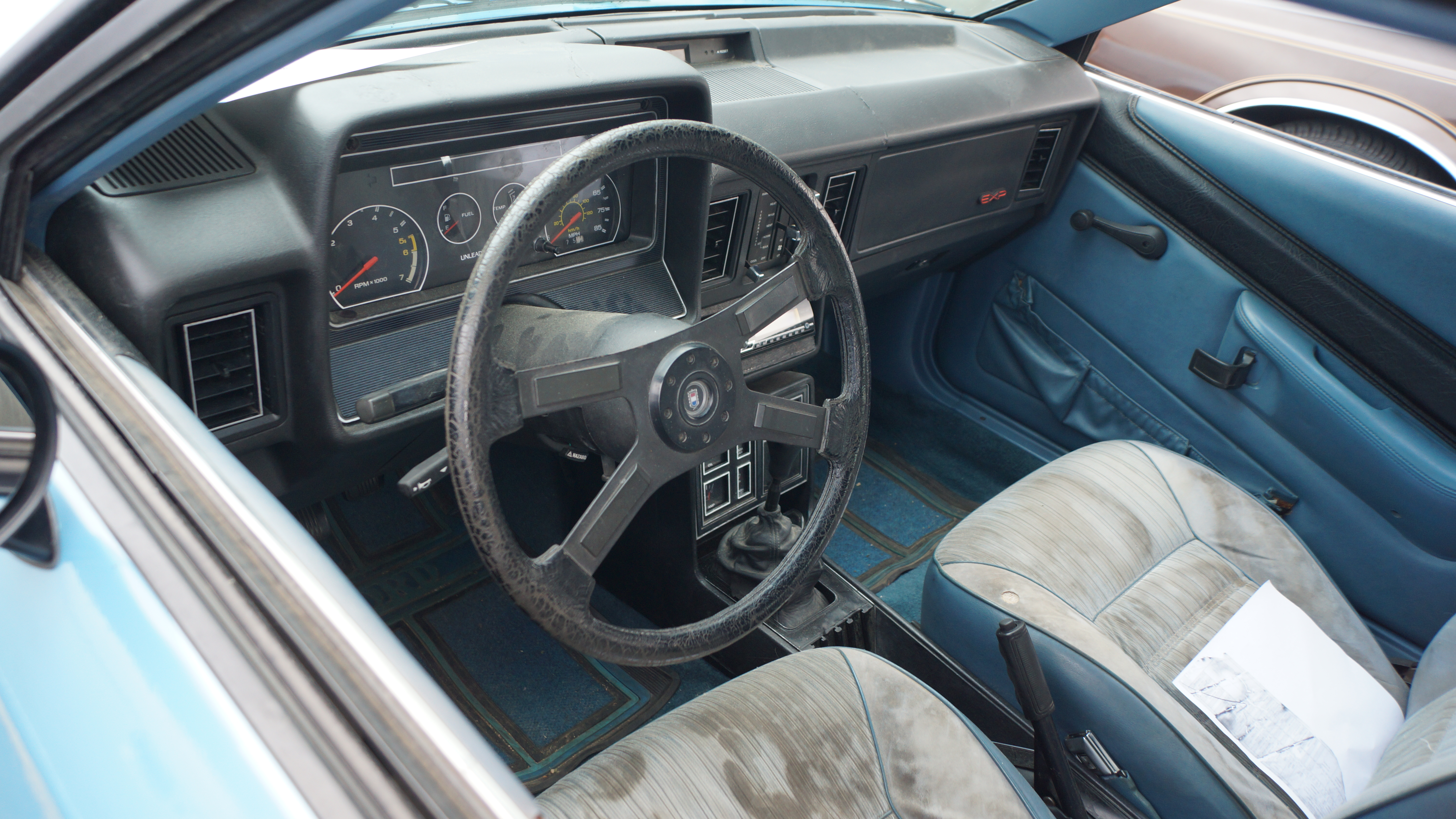
1982 Ford EXP interior

Priced considerably higher than the Escort, the EXP had an extensive list of standard equipment that included power brakes, full instrumentation, full carpeting, map lighting (non-sunroof), electric rear window defroster, power hatchback release, a digital clock, a cargo area security shade, and wider rims than those on the Escort. Models with a manual transmission had a sport-tuned exhaust. Automatic models had a wide-open throttle cutout switch for the optional air conditioning compressor clutch. Other options include floor vents and power steering or air conditioning and manual steering, AM/FM radio, cruise control, roof luggage rack, rear window wiper, various seat styles and fabrics, removable sunroof, right hand mirror, TRX tires and suspension, child seat, and a wide variety of interior and exterior colors along with various pinstripes and decals.

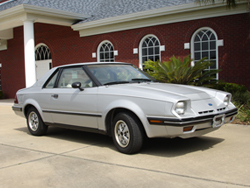
A 1982 Ford EXP

As the full 1982 model year began, Ford offered an optional 4.05:1 final drive at no extra cost for better performance. A close-ratio version of the four-speed transmission with 3.59:1 final drive ratio appeared later for the same reason. Ford also offered an 8 in (203 mm) rear brake drum set over the 7 in (178 mm) rear brake drums of other EXPs and Escorts. Over time many different rim options became available but the color choices became more limited.

In March 1982, an 80 hp (60 kW) "High Output" (H.O.) version of the CVH engine became available. It had higher (9.0:1) compression, a dual-inlet air cleaner, lower-restriction exhaust, a bifurcated four-into-two-into-one exhaust manifold, larger carburetor venturis (a 32 mm primary and a 34 mm secondary compared to the 32 mm of both venturis in the non-HO engine), and a higher-lift (0.289 mm) camshaft.

In the last week of September 1982, Ford Canada, in co-operation with Bosch, produced the first electronic multi-port fuel-injected (EFI) 1.6 L for the EXP GT and LN7, giving it the distinction of being the first Ford model offered with that option for the US market. The original 70 hp (52 kW) engine was no longer available. Fuel injection managed by Ford's EEC-IV control module was added on to the existing H.O. CVH engine, producing 88 hp (66 kW) at 5,400 rpm and 94 lb⋅ft (127 N⋅m) of torque in a 9.5:1 compression ratio, naturally aspirated configuration giving it an affinity for higher octane fuel. For buyers in regions of higher elevation the 1.6 L EFI option was replaced with the 1.6 L HO motor, making the 1.6 L EFI even more rare. Also new was a five-speed manual transmission option.

New for the 1983 model year were base seats with knitted rather than solid vinyl, and optional "Recaro-style" sport seats with mesh headrests. As was the case for the regular Escort/Lynx, the shifter was moved rearwards while the automatic shifter dropped the unusual dogleg pattern in favor of a more common straight-line arrangement. The gas tank was enlarged to 13 US gallons (49 L). There were no notable changes to the exterior aside from new wheel options.

=== Mercury LN7 ===
The Mercury division of Ford marketed a version of the EXP as the Mercury LN7. The differences are limited to badging, trim, and a few unique body parts. As with the 1983–1986 Mercury Capri, the LN7 has a rear hatch with a convex-curved "bubbleback" glass backlite. Its taillights are tinted black, and the grille has ten slats instead of the two of the EXP. The LN7's coefficient of drag ($\scriptstyle C_\mathrm d\,$) is 0.36. Engine and transmission developments tracked the changes to the EXP.

In 1983, in addition to the changes made to the EXP, the woodgrain on the LN7's dash was replaced with black plastic, and the instrument graphics were revised.

The LN7 sold far under sales projections and was discontinued after the 1983 model year after approximately 40,000 were sold; compared to the rest of the Lincoln-Mercury model line, a two-seat compact sports coupe was relatively out of place.

=== TR Performance Package ===
A major option for 1982 was the TR package, which was offered in all model years of both cars. The TR package featured Michelin TRX metric tires on 365 mm (14.4 in) diameter wheels. For 1983, TRX tires became available mounted on steel rims.

TRX tires were made with an extremely soft rubber compound that resulted in good cornering performance, but that also made them prone to rapid wear. TRX tires were mainly produced by Michelin, and have not been manufactured since the 1990s, and so cannot be replaced. Even perfectly stored TRX tires typically exhibit severe rotting and/or checking. Since the metric-dimension TRX wheels cannot mount tires sized in inches, TRX wheels are now obsolete.

The TR Performance Package also included:

- Stiffer valving for the struts (Turbo models had red Konis)
- Higher rate front springs (160 lb/in vs standard 120 lb/in)
- Larger front anti-roll bar (26 mm vs standard 24 mm, Turbo models are 27 mm)
- Stiffer suspension bushings
- Higher rate progressive rear springs (320-548 lb/in vs standard 195 lb/in continuous rate)

=== EXP Turbo Coupe ===
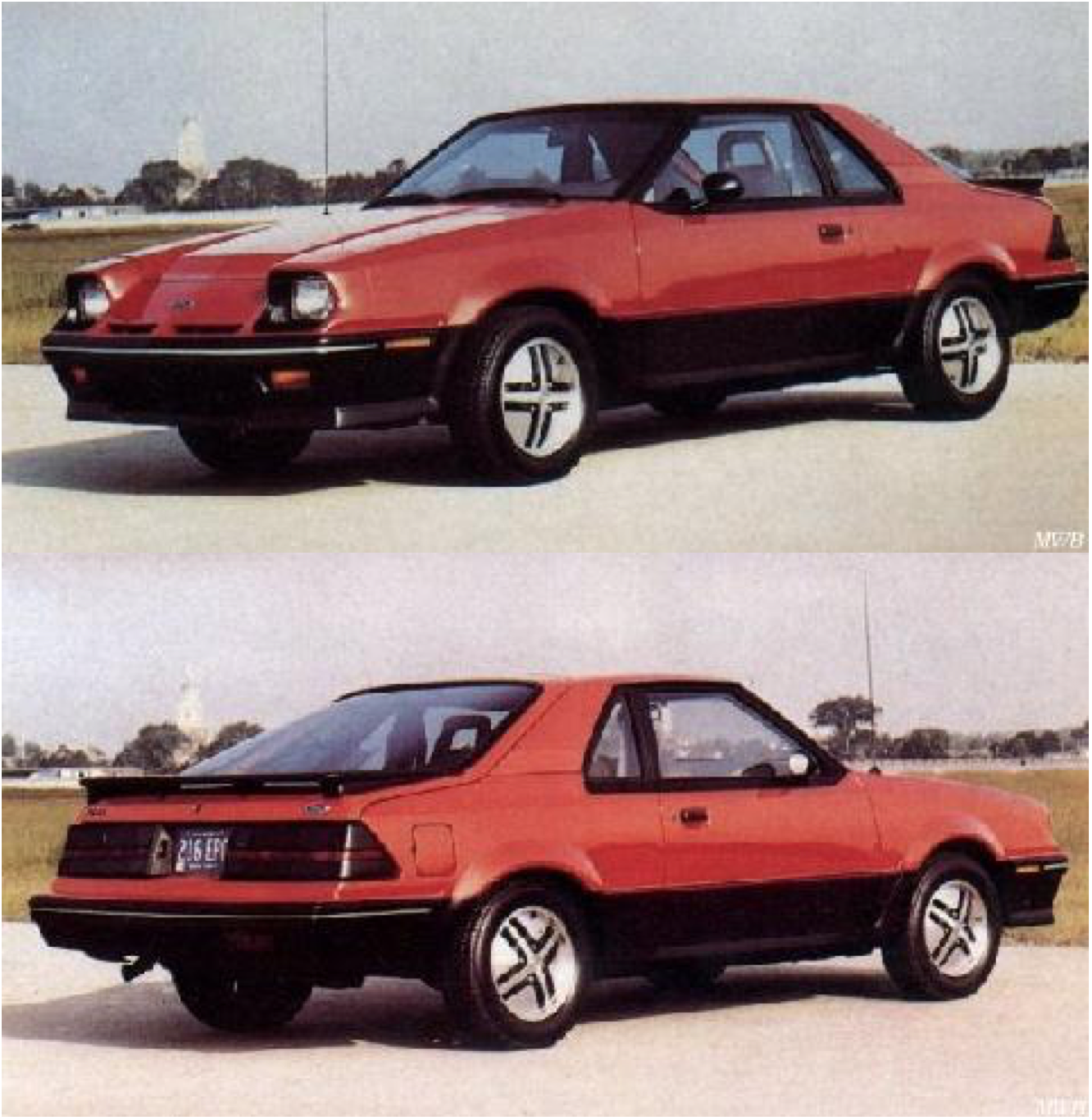

By 1984, Ford was targeting the youth market, especially the affluent young motorist, with offerings such as the Mustang SVO, Thunderbird Turbo Coupe, and the new EXP Turbo Coupe also built by Ford's Special Vehicle Operations (SVO). It shared many parts with the McLaren ASC EXP, including a turbocharged engine, Koni shocks, stiffer springs, lower ride height, improved brakes, and Michelin TRX tires.

The EXP's initial development plan called for fuel injection and a turbocharger to increase power output, but there was not enough time to get them into the first two production years. The turbocharged 1.6 L CVH engine offered in the Escort and Turbo EXP features a high-lift camshaft and EEC-IV electronic controls. With an 8:1 compression ratio and boost pressure up to 8 psi (0.55 bar), torque is increased to 120 lb⋅ft (162.7 N⋅m) and power raised to 120 hp (89.5 kW), a gain of 35% over the naturally aspirated models.

These improvements resulted in a 0–60 mph (0–100 km/h) time of 9 seconds and 1/4-mile (0.40 km) time of 16.9 seconds at 82 mph (132.0 km/h) which, while unimpressive today, was good for the era. The 1983 EFI or HO 5-speed EXPs accelerate 0–60 mph in 14 seconds, and do the 1/4-mile (0.40 km) in 20 seconds at 70 mph (112.7 km/h), depending on options and model year. Not even the 1986–88 EXPs with the 1.9 L EFI HO motor, with a 1/4-mile (0.40 km) time of 17.5 seconds at 77 mph (123.9 km/h), could match the Turbo EXP.

The Turbo Coupe has a unique front air dam and rear decklid spoiler, with a "Turbo" decal on the rear bumper. It has two-tone paint with a black lower section, a unique C-pillar appliqué featuring the EXP lettering, black wheel flares, and black rocker panel moldings.

The only options were air conditioning and a removable sunroof. 1985 model year cars switched from a three-spoke steering wheel to a two-spoke steering wheel, the softer two-piece shift knob and vinyl boot to the one-piece shift knob and square rubber boot. For 1986 a federally-mandated third brake light was built into the rear spoiler.

== Second generation (1985–1988) ==
Second generation
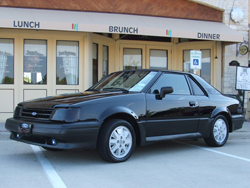

Overview
- Model years: 1985.5–1988

Powertrain
- Engine: 1.9 L CVH I4
- Transmission: 4-speed MTX-I manual 5-speed MTX-III manual 3-speed FLC automatic

Dimensions
- Wheelbase: 94.2 in (2,393 mm)
- Length: 170.3 in (4,326 mm)
- Width: 65.9 in (1,674 mm)
- Height: 50.5 in (1,283 mm)
- Curb weight: 2,388 lb (1,083 kg)

After four years of production, the first-generation EXP was discontinued during the 1985 model year. Originally marketed towards buyers that valued fuel efficiency over high performance, the Ford EXP had begun to struggle against newer, sportier vehicles. Build quality and refinement were also inferior to its Japanese competitors.

In 1985, a group of Ford assembly employees took an EXP off the line and upgraded it with parts from the updated 1985½ Ford Escort. This one-off "prototype" built by the factory workers was presented to Ford CEO Donald Petersen, who approved it for production as a "1985½" model.

Officially renamed the Ford Escort EXP, the second-generation EXP abandoned the controversial front headlight nacelles and widely flared fenders in favor of a version of the bodywork from the standard Ford Escort, sharing its flush-mounted headlamps and amber turn signal lenses. The Escort EXP was given a model-specific front bumper with an integrated air dam; along with the Escort GT, the EXP was produced with its own grille, distinguished by a single slot below the Ford emblem. The rear bodywork remained largely the same; with the exception of the Mercury LN7 "bubble hatch" becoming standard; the grey rear taillamp lenses introduced in 1985 were retained. To match the lowered front bumpers, the rear bumpers were redesigned.

Along with the exterior, the interior of the EXP was redesigned to match the rest of the Ford Escort line.

=== Luxury Coupe (1985.5–1988) ===
The Ford Escort EXP Luxury Coupe was equipped with low-back cloth/vinyl (or all-vinyl) seats from the standard Escort, AM/FM stereo radio, overhead console, left remote mirror (standard), with a tachometer and trip odometer. From its 1985½ introduction to the end of 1986, the Luxury Coupe came with a 1.9 L CVH with a 2-barrel carburetor, making 90 hp (67.1 kW). For 1987 and 1988, the 1.9 L engine was equipped with throttle-body fuel injection, called Central Fuel Injection (CFI) by Ford, and made 90 hp (67.1 kW).

=== Sport Coupe (1986–1988) ===
Introduced for 1986, the Ford Escort EXP Sport Coupe was produced through 1988. Externally distinguished by 15-inch alloy wheels, dual electric mirrors, and fog lamps, the Sport Coupe was fitted with components from the Ford Escort GT, including suspension and brake upgrades and sport bucket seats. Fitted with a center console, the Sport Coupe was equipped with a systems monitor (with LEDs as warning indicators for headlights, taillights, and fuel level). The Sport Coupe was fitted with a 106 hp (79 kW) version of the 1.9 L CVH engine, equipped with multiport fuel injection. For 1987, the output was increased to 115 hp (86 kW).

== Discontinuation ==
From its 1982 introduction, sales of the EXP were never as strong as Ford marketing executives had intended. After the introduction of competitive two-seat vehicles (such as the Pontiac Fiero, Toyota MR2 and Honda CRX), buyers shifted towards higher-performance vehicles. During the 1980s, insurance rates on two-seat cars were rising over those of cars with back seats, creating a separate deterrent for buyers.

Within Ford, the development of the Ford Mustang played a separate part in the demise of the EXP. In 1982, Ford commenced work on the fourth-generation Mustang; beginning work on a "design of tomorrow", the goal was to shift the Mustang from rear-wheel drive to front-wheel drive, increasing fuel efficiency; in place of the Fox platform, the Mustang was to become a counterpart of the Mazda MX-6. At the time, General Motors was considering a similar redesign of the Chevrolet Camaro and Pontiac Firebird by 1990.

By the mid-1980s, as the public learned of the planned front-wheel drive Mustang, it spawned a negative reaction from buyers and dealers, leading Ford to reconsider the decision. However, as the front-wheel drive car was significantly far along in the development cycle, Ford chose to bring it to production, renaming it Ford Probe (after a series of aerodynamically advanced Ford concept cars). As Ford could not afford the market overlap of producing three compact sports coupes (alongside the Ford Festiva, Ford Escort, and Ford Tempo two-doors), the company chose to discontinue the Escort EXP, as it was the slowest-selling nameplate.

In October 1988, after over 225,000 Ford (Escort) EXPs were produced, the final Ford Escort EXP rolled off the assembly line.

== Production ==
Ford (Escort) EXP/ Mercury LN7 production total
Year	Ford EXP	Mercury LN7	EXP and LN7 Combined
1982	98,256	35,147	133,403
1983	19,697	4,528	24,225
1984	23,016		
1985	26,462		
1986	30,978		
1987	25,888		
1988	(Note: Complete number unknown; EXP production included with Ford Escort for 1988)		
Total	224,297 (Note: 1982-1987 total; 1988 production unknown)	39,675	263,972 (In Total)

== Feature timeline ==
Ford EXP & Mercury LN7 Comparison, 1982–1988
First generation	Second generation
Mercury LN7	Ford EXP
Characteristic	1982	1983	1982	1983	1984	1985	1986	1987	1988
Interior	Square Dashboard
Colored Dashboard	Colored Dashboard
Center Arm Rest	Center Arm Rest
Round Dashboard
Rubber Shift Knob & Vinyl Boot
Rubber Shift Knob & Rubber Square Boot
Transmissions	FLC Automatic
MTX-I (4-Speed)
MTX-III (5-Speed)	MTX-III (5-Speed)
Suspension, Motor & Trans Mount, &Trans Spec	Original "Escort" Mounts, Front Suspension, & Trans
Upgraded "Tempo" Mounts, Front Suspension, & Trans
Engines	1.6 L Carb
1.6 L Carb HO
1.6 L EFI	1.6 L EFI
1.6 L Turbo
1.9 L Carb
1.9 L EFI (CFI)
1.9 L EFI HO
Body	"Frog-Eye" Nose
Escort Nose
Round Door Mirrors
Square Door Mirrors
Notchback Hatch
Bubbleback Hatch	Bubbleback Hatch
Fanned/Gilled Sails	Fanned/Gilled Sails
"EXP" Sails (Select Trims)
"Tic-Tac-Toe" Sails
Red Taillights
Black Taillights	Black Taillights
Third taillight (on all 2nd gens and 85 Turbo Coupes)
Spoiler (1984/1985 only for Turbo Coupe)
Hood Wiper Squirter
Cowl Wiper Squirter

== Variants ==
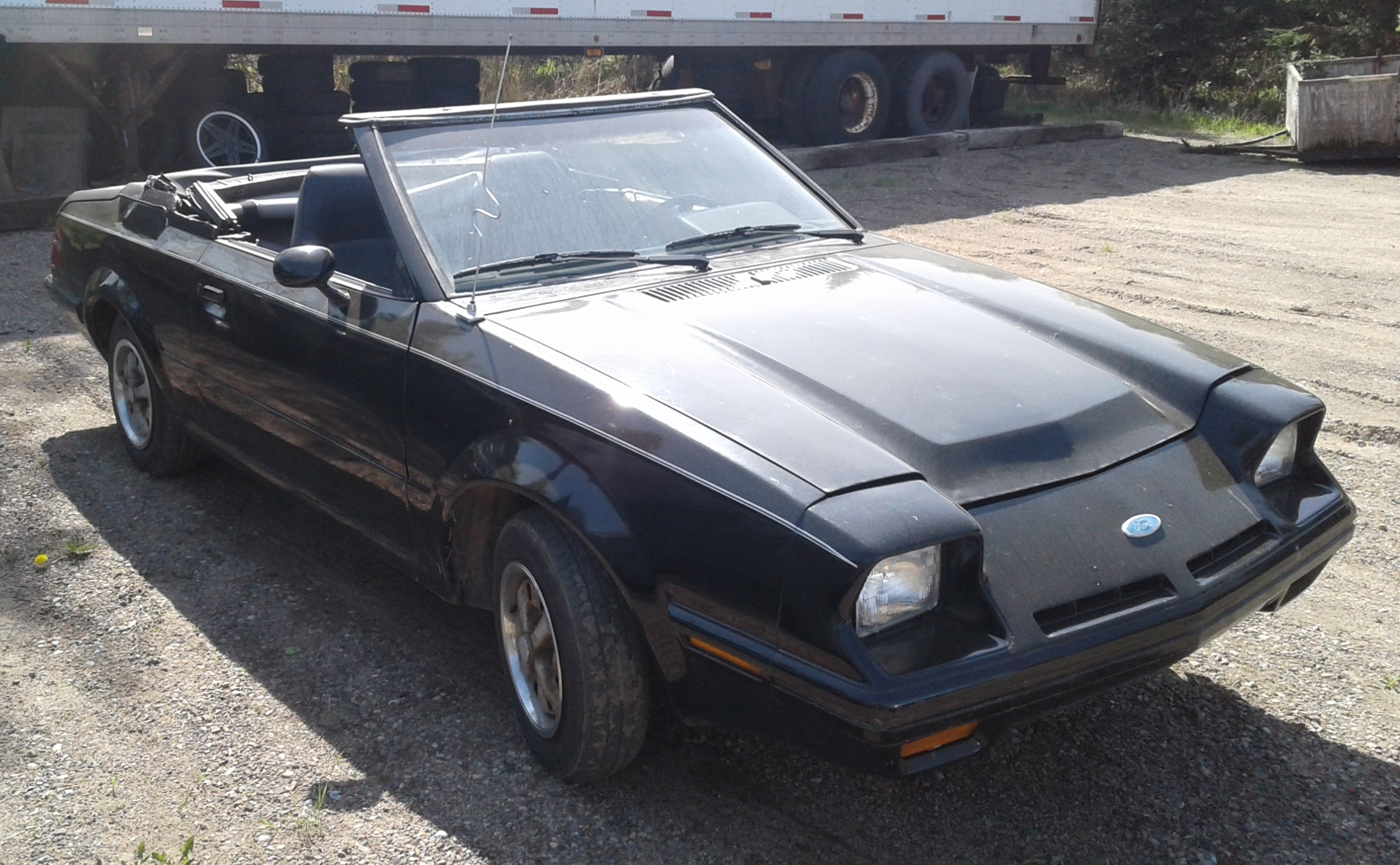
1982 Ford EXP Convertible number 2

=== EXP and LN7 convertibles ===
Ford was experimenting with the EXP's potential with the newly released EXPs and LN7s of 1982. A select few of each were turned into convertible models. These models are very rare as Ford did not sell any more than the estimated twenty-eight LN7s and recorded eight EXPs that were produced, not to mention what kind of costs were involved in converting these cars. The eight EXPs were converted by Dynamic Conversions in Hillsdale, Michigan. The 28 LN7s were converted by Andy Hotten's crew in Ford's St Thomas factory where most EXPs and LN7s were built. Very few of these convertible models are reported to be around today.

=== EXP EV ===
Further experimentation from Ford with their EXPs resulted in producing four all-electric EXPs. These selected 1982 EXPs are powered by 39 hp (29.1 kW) GE (General Electric) electric motors and Soleq parts all built together by Electric Vehicle Associates (EVA) out of Cleveland, OH. EVA used their technology from the Escorts they made ("EVcorts"). Production of both vehicles were limited as the costs to convert these two cars was far beyond the cars' original values. Its original range is estimated between 20 and 60 miles with a top speed of 60 mph (97 km/h). This idea did not meet expectations either as these EXPs were lacking both sport and practicality. It is unsure if EVA went on to convert EXPs and Escorts at their own expense.

Many other EXPs would be subject to electric propulsion, but not at Ford's expense. It was a popular competition in colleges, tech schools, and universities to convert smaller cars like EXPs to electric power and then compete against other schools with them. Involved in these competitions were the cars' general performance, endurance, and efficiency.

=== EXP ASC/McLaren ===
In 1982, American Sunroof Company (ASC) and McLaren supposedly equipped two EXPs with sunroofs, true notchbacks, ground effects, and charged aspiration. ASC (American Sunroof Corporation) did the cosmetic modifications and McLaren made the performance modifications. One has the following modifications: a supercharger, turbocharger, tighter steering, 1 inch shorter ride height, Recaro racing seats, TRX suspension, KONI shocks, twin fuel pumps, fuel injection, machined uprights (for wheel clearance), enhanced power steering, and portion-valved brakes. This EXP ASC McLaren makes 120 hp (89.5 kW) and 137 lb⋅ft (185.7 N⋅m) of torque. Ford already had their own removable sunroofs optional for all EXPs & LN7s but later (1984-1985) added their own ground effects, "bubblebacks", and spoilers to save money and turbocharged EXPs themselves to make the same amount of power. The other EXP has yet to be spotted.

== Promotional specials ==
=== LN7 Scoundrel 500 ===
As part of a Weinstock's promotion a select batch of Mercury LN7s were built with all black interior, purple exterior, and gold pinstripes along the body and within the black bump strips. These LN7s had every available factory option and could only be won by sweepstakes entries (not open to Weinstock's or Ford employees). Along with being awarded an LN7, winners were granted a $1000 gift certificate from Weinstock's. If a winner had already ordered an LN7 they could be refunded in full and their ordered LN7 became the Scoundrel Edition car if they so chose. It's assumed that only 500 of these LN7s were ever made.

=== LN7 Budweiser King ===
Another promotional sweepstakes event involved some LN7 replicas of the Budweiser Race Team's LN7 funny-car in 1982. Grand prize of the drawing was a normal LN7 (provided by Ford Motor Company) painted to perfectly match the real drag strip car, only one model is known to exist and its whereabouts are unknown. First prizes were tickets to two NHRA national events. Second prizes were four go-cart replicas of the Budweiser funny car, eight others were won at select NHRA events. It is unknown how many were made but they were all built by Ford Motor Company with 3 hp (2.2 kW) motors powering them up to 15 mph (24.1 km/h).

== Ghia Brezza ==
The Ghia Brezza is a concept car commissioned by Ford and built by Carrozzeria Ghia. The coachbuilder created the Brezza's chassis by cutting up two donor EXP chassis, and welding together pieces of each to create a mid-engined result.

Ghia staff designer Marilena Corvasce was assigned to the project. The Brezza is said to have been the first complete car designed by a female designer. Because of this the Brezza was given the Heritage Vehicle Association's HVA Heritage Award.

== GN34 ==
At least one first-generation EXP was modified as an early development mule for the 3.0 L SHO V6 engine co-developed between Ford and Yamaha and was part of Ford's GN34 program to develop a mid-engine sports car. Some were made RWD with the Yamaha V6 on display in the rear bubble hatch while others were AWD models with the V6 under the hatch as well. Some V6s were punched from 3.0 to 3.2 to 3.4 to 3.6 liters all mated to a ZF-5 transmissions.

It is unknown how many EXP-based test mules were built; later prototypes were custom-built designs. The GN34 mid-engine sports car was shelved in the late 1980s, with the Ford-Yamaha V6 engine leading to the introduction of the Ford Taurus SHO sports sedan.

== Motorsport ==
=== PPG CART Indy Car Series Pace Cars ===
==== 1981 LN7 ====
One Mercury LN7 was converted specifically for the 1981 PPG CART Indy Car World Series. It featured a dramatic front chin spoiler, brake-cooling ducts ahead of the rear wheels, 14" Apache-5 aluminum wheels, clear headlight and foglight covers (for aero-speed purposes), and a wrap-around rear spoiler all provided by ASC (American Sunroof Company) and Ford.

The power plant was an early turbocharged 1.6L CVH built by Jack Roush and Ford's SVO, featuring a reworked Motorcraft 2150 2-barrel carburetor, TRW cold-forged pistons for 8.5:1 compression, magna-fluxed and polished factory connecting rods, ported head with 3-angle valve seats milled down 0.06", stock camshaft and lifters, European 1.6 L CVH head gasket, a turbocharger adding just 8 psi (0.55 bar) (but capable of providing 15 psi (1.03 bar) with race fuel), custom 6 US qt (5.7 L) baffled oil pan, and water-alcohol-injection all adding up to 7,000RPMs (electronically limited) of 180 hp (134.2 kW) (no dyno results were recorded above 8 psi of boost).

The transmission is a factory Escort/Lynx/EXP/LN7 4-speed manual transmission blue-printed with extreme care and tight tolerances at an aircraft level allowing it to handle both the 180 hp (134.2 kW) at 7,000 RPMs of input, and top speeds around 125 mph (201.2 km/h).

Suspension had to be heavily modified to handle 125 mph (201.2 km/h) and fast turns. Doing so required a thicker sway-bar, lower ride height, increased spring rate by 15%, Koni shocks all around, and redesigned, fully adjustable rear suspension.

The interior is near factory specifications with the addition of multiple warning lights and boost gauge, full roll cage, fuel cell, fire-countermeasures, and ASC/McLaren sport seats with 4-point harnesses.

Outside of the "1982 CART Indy World Series News Media Guide" very few photos of the car exist but it is currently on display in the Roush Racing Museum with the 1982 EXP PPG Pace Car among a few of Ford's GN34 specimens.

==== 1982 EXP ====
One Ford EXP was converted to serve as a CART Series PPG Indy Car World Series Pace Car in 1982. This car wears a tapered front clip and unique hatch and body-integrated spoiler, both reminiscent of a past EXP prototype. It also is widened at each of the four quarter panels of the car believed to allow room for a Ford-Yamaha SHO V6 in the front or possibly in the rear like the aforementioned GN34 EXP experiment. It is also possible to be host to another 1.6 L CVH built and turbocharged by Jack Roush and Ford's SVO.

Very few photos of the car exist but it is currently on display in the Roush Racing Museum with the 1981 LN7 PPG Pace Car among a few of Ford's GN34 specimens.

=== SCCA EXP/LN7 ===
Ford provided three EXP/LN7 cars for SCCA competition racing in 1981–1983.

One car was made with PBS. What was previously an LN7 was transformed into a competition race car through fiberglass body parts, racing suspension, and a PBS 2.0 L (Ford 1.6 L) CVH mated with a 5-speed transmission.

A second car was made into a competition rally car by Blume Power Inc. for driver "Dick Turner" rumored to be RWD and hosting a V8 under the hood. The third car was another circuit car like the PBS LN7 but little is known about this racer.
