= Ford MTX transmission =

The Ford MTX transmission is a 4 or 5-speed manual transaxle used in some of Ford's front-wheel-drive North American passenger cars (Escort, EXP, Tempo, Taurus and their Mercury counterparts) from 1981 to 1994.

These "MTX's" (1 through 5) are unique to themselves and are not to be confused with Ford's other "MTX" transmissions like the "MTX-75" later found in 1995-2001 Contours, Mystiques, and Cougars.

== MTX-I ==
The MTX-I was a 4 speed manual transaxle introduced in the Ford Escort and Mercury Lynx as a base model "fuel saver" design. It would be the base option transmission for Ford EXPs and Mercury LN7s in 1982.

Gear ratios:

Years Offered	1	2	3	4	R	Final drive
1981-1984	3.58	2.05	1.23	0.81	3.46	3.58
1981-1982	3.58	2.05	1.23	0.81	3.46	4.05
1983-1984	3.23	1.90	1.23	0.81	3.46	3.04

== MTX-II ==
The MTX-II was also 4 speed manual transaxle but would replace the MTX-I in 1984 and be available until 1990 with the end of the 1st gen Escort & Lynx. It was supposed to be a stronger unit than the previous 4-speed MTX now designed to work with stronger axles and stronger transmission mounts of the new Ford Tempo and Mercury Topaz from 1984 forward.

Gear ratios:

Years Offered	1	2	3	4	R	Final drive
1985	3.21	1.81	1.15	0.78	3.27	2.85
1986-1990	3.46	1.81	1.15	0.78	3.27	3.52

== MTX-III ==
The MTX-III was introduced in 1983 in the Ford Escort, Ford EXP, Mercury LN7, and Mercury Lynx. It was also available in the Tempo and Topaz throughout their ten-year run, and was used in the Taurus MT-5.

It would see some changes in 1984 (including a different shift pattern) to work with the new Tempo and Topaz and their stronger mechanical hardware. This updated version would be optional among all Escorts, Lynxes, Tempos, and Topazes from 1984 to 1994. It would also be the standard transmission for all Ford EXPs from 1984 until 1988 when production ended and from 1986 to 1989 in the 4-cylinder Taurus.

This transmission was discontinued in 1994. A 3.73 final drive ratio version was standard in the Escort GT/Lynx RS, 2.3L HSO Tempo GLS/Topaz XR5/LTS sport sedans/coupes.

Gear ratios:

1	2	3	4	5	R	Final drive
3.60	2.12	1.39	1.02	0.77	3.62	3.33

== MTX-IV ==
The MTX-IV is a beefed-up version built by Mazda and introduced in 1989 for the Taurus SHO. It was also used in Tempo/Topaz models equipped with the Vulcan V6. Installing this transaxle into a V6 Tempo requires the use of a Tempo-specific flywheel, clutch, pressure plate and CV axles. This transaxle has also been used in the aftermarket to convert a 3.0L Vulcan-powered Taurus to a manual, something which was not offered from the factory.

Gear ratios (Vulcan Tempo/Topaz):

1	2	3	4	5	R	Final drive
3.60	2.12	1.39	1.02	0.76	3.62	3.52

Gear ratios (Taurus SHO):

1	2	3	4	5	R	Final drive
3.21	2.09	1.38	1.02	0.74^{†}	3.42	3.74^{†}

† - The actual 5th gear ratio is 1.02:1 (same as 4th gear), but it runs through a different final drive gear from gears 1-4 and reverse, with a ratio of 2.73:1, thus giving it an effective gear ratio of 0.74:1, if one assumes that it has the same final drive ratio as the rest of the gears.

== See also ==
Ford MTX-75 transmission
